= Arthur Manukyan =

Armenian director and producer (born 1985)

- Արթուր Մանուկյան
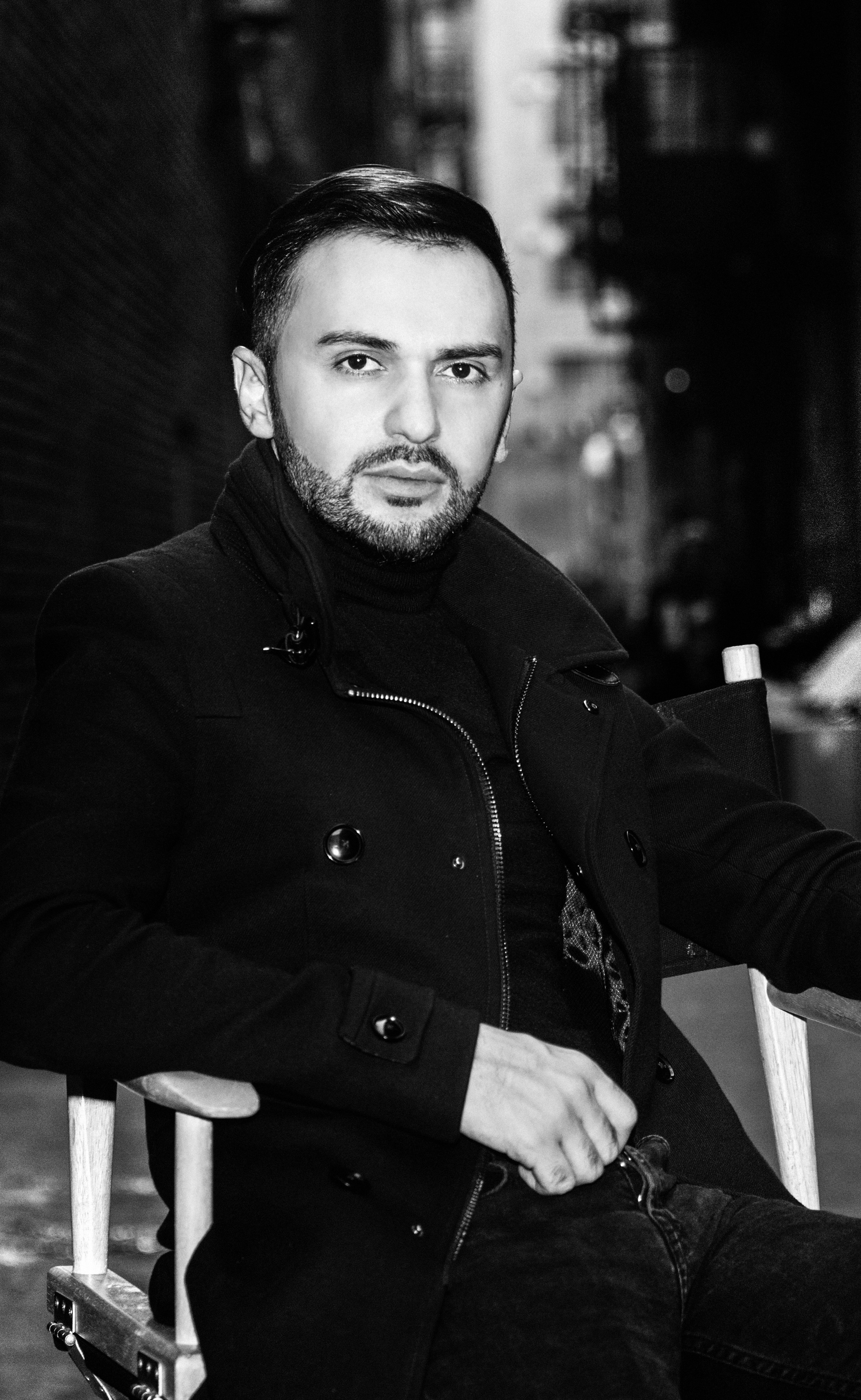
- Born: July 4, 1985 (age 41); Vagharshapat, Armenia
- Citizenship: Armenia
- Occupations: director; producer
- Years active: 2006–
- Awards: World Armenian Entertainment Awards; Pan Armenian Entertainment Awards; Best Music Video (Armenchik «Father»); Best Project (Erik «Live in concert»); Europe Armenian Music Awards 2017

Arthur Manukyan (Armenian: Արթուր Մանուկյան; born July 4, 1985) is an Armenian director and producer, best known for producing and directing music videos of Armenian singers. He also directed dozens of television projects and events.

== Biography ==
Arthur Manukyan was born on July 4, 1985, in Armenia. He finished Middle School in 2002 during which he was also attending to classes in Yerevan Dancing Art State College. He studied film directing in the Yerevan State Institute of Theatre and Cinematography (at the studio of Ruben Gevorgyants) from 2002 to 2008. In 2006, he won the Special Award at the "I am" film festival. From 2008, he started to work at the Public Radio of Armenia as the speaker of "Arevik" children and youth ensemble. From 2009 to 2011, he was the director of the "Witness" television program at the Public Television Company of Armenia. He started to work for ATV channel from 2009 as the director of "Good Morning", "The Flight", "Musical Box", "Pop Encyclopedia" and "Cosmic Show" (special offer from "Cosmopolitan Armenia") programs. From 2011 to 2012, he worked for "ArmNews" channel as a director. He has directed TV programs and mass events, such as the Armenian Stages of International Song Contest "Eurovision", New Year programs", concerts (concert for the 19th Anniversary Celebration of Armenia's Independence (2010), "Feelings of Love" by Ani Christy's solo concert at the Alex Theatre live-performance auditorium (2014), concert of "Amaras" dance band (2015), "Live in concert" by Erik Karapetyan (2015), Martin Mkrtchyan's concert at the Dolby Theatre live-performance auditorium (2016), solo concerts of Saro Tovmasyan (2018), Hripsime Hakobyan (2019) and Noro (2019, Dolby Theatre)). Arthur Manukyan has cooperated with huge companies as VTB Armenia, Evocabank, Gyumri Beer. He has directed around 200 music videos, concerts, TV projects, events and different ceremonies. He worked with many Armenian artists, such as Arame, André, Ani Christy, Razmik Amyan, Emmy, Martin Mkrtchyan, Erik Karapetyan, Iveta Mukuchyan, Armenchik, Arminka, Saro, Nune Yesayan, Lilit Hovhannisyan, Christine Pepelyan, Mihran Tsarukyan, Arpi Gabrielyan, Arthur Grigoryan, Avet Barseghyan, Betty, Mika, Anna Avanesyan, Armenchik, Athena Manoukian, Sevak Khanaghyan, Sona Sarkisyan, Sevak Amroyan, Artsvik, Srbuk and others .

During this time Arthur has cooperated with Armenia TV, Armnews TV, ATV, Public TV Company of Armenia, PanArmenian TV. In 2011 he directed the Armenian National Selection of Junior Eurovision Son ContestFrom. 2013 he started to work or Armenia TV as the director of "Nane" program. He was nominated and won the "Best Director of Year" title at the World Armenian Entertainment Awards. He started to work at the Public Television Company of Armenia as a director where he directed the "Woman by Fate" (2014–2015) and "Benefice" (2 seasons, from 2016 to 2017) programs. In 2016, he directed the "Almighty Singer" program. 2016–2018 Arthur has worked with famous American Production "Global art" in the position of Art Director. During 2017–2018 he directed the "Destinies Beyond the Ocean" TV program.։ In 2019 he organized the opening ceremony of ConIFA Artsakh 2019. Armenian phase of Junior Eurovision Song Contest 2019, RA Prime Minister's "Hero of Our Time" Award Ceremony in Gyumri Black Berd, Opening Ceremony of "Erebuni-Yerevan 2801" Official Event. Arthur also has directed events and ceremonies as the "September 21" Armenian independent day ceremony, "Anahit" awards, 2019 CONIFA European Football Cup which were hosted in Artsakh, Artavazd annual theatrical ceremony, "Tsitsernak" music awards.

== Music videos of Eurovision ==
=== Eurovision 2017 ===
On March 18, 2017, the music video of Fly with Me was premiered (the song was released as a digital download on March 29, 2017, through Universal Music), and it was announced that it will be the song of Armenian in Eurovision Song Contest 2017. Arthur Manukyan was the director of the music video of that song.

According to Arthur Manukyan, the song conveyed so much emotion and at the same time caused so many different emotions that he decided to use different symbols in the music video:

This music video is like my own reflection. I was greatly inspired by this song, and I hope that fans and viewers around the world will love it as much as I did.

— Arthur Manukyan

According to the Armenian version of the official website of Eurovision Song Contest, the music video also retains the song's melodic line and attempts to present different ethnic features. Performances and light effects reflected the sun's rays, which, as the song says, shine at the same temperature for everyone.

=== Eurovision 2018 ===
In December 2017, Khanagyan was announced as one of the competitors in Depi Evratesil 2018, the Armenian national selection for the Eurovision Song Contest 2018. On January 16, 2018, his song "Qami" was premiered. Khanagyan competed in the second semi-final of Depi Evratesil on February 22, 2018, and became one of the five qualifiers to advance to the final on February 25. On February 25, the song was chosen as the winner of the competition. The director of the music video of this song is Arthur Manukyan.

When I first heard the song I instantly thought that the music video should reflect Sevak's inner world – his emotions and feelings. There aren't any excessive elements in the video – it is minimalistic, yet very expressive. I wanted to keep it simple and concentrate the attention on Sevak and his song.

— Arthur Manukyan

On March 16, 2018, a teaser of the music video was uploaded to Eurovision's official YouTube channel. It premiered on the same channel on March 21.

=== Eurovision 2019 ===
The music video for "Walking Out", a song by Armenian singer Srbuk which represented Armenia at the Eurovision Song Contest 2019 in Tel Aviv, Israel, directed by Arthur Manukyan, was teased on March 8, 2019. It was released on Eurovision's official YouTube channel on March 10. The music video was filmed in Armenfilm studio by Factory production.

According to Srbuk:

We wanted to visually portray the emotions within a loving but betrayed heart. When you think you will be filled with joy, but instead there is not enough air to breathe. When you want to share your happiness, but instead you start losing yourself: your hands are tied, your emotions are overwhelming, you keep pretending just to keep your love alive. But what are you waiting for? How long can you play by these rules? These are the questions and emotions visualized in the music video.

— Srbuk

According to Arthur Manukyan,

When I first heard the song, I immediately thought about the images and characters that you already see in the music video. Srbuk's character forces you to approach the work with such simplicity, that is, we didn't try to find complex plot solutions and so on. Symbols too, as you can see, are not too obligatory. Instead, they are relative and invisible, that is, everyone can perceive and interpret them in their own way. Indead, Srbuk's style approach has a big influence on the general structure of the music video.։

— Arthur Manukyan

The music video mostly received positive reviews and has over 6 million views on YouTube.։

=== Eurovision 2020/ Europe Shine a Light ===
In March 2020, he again directed the music video for Armenia's Eurovision entry, the Hip Hop and R&B inspired song Chains on You by Greek-Armenian singer-songwriter Athena Manoukian, which had been selected after winning The Armenian selection in February 2020. The video was released on March 13, and largely sees her in two surroundings – in front of, and on top of, a giant diamond, and on a throne.

"We had only 2 weeks after Depi Evratesil to revamp the song and shoot the music video, and after days and nights of rehearsals and preparations I’m very excited to share the result of our work. It is truly a joy working alongside such a professional team and believe me, we have a lot more surprises coming up!"

— Athena Manoukian explains her song's music video, directed by Manukyan

Whilst Eurovision Song Contest 2020 was cancelled the following week, the music video, which had earned widespread praise from fans, would be featured in replacement entertainment such as Eurovision: Europe Shine a Light and Eurovision Song Celebration and got over 4 million YouTube views as of May 26, 2020. In a poll on the fan website Wiwibloggs, it was voted for by fans as their second favourite music video out of the would-be 2020 entries.

=== Eurovision 2024 ===
Manukyan directed the music video for "Jako" by Ladaniva, which represented Armenia in the Eurovision Song Contest 2024; he also directed the staging of the performance at the contest.

== Works ==
=== Filmography ===
Year	Name
2005	"Traces" (student work)
2005	"I Hate that I Loved Once" documentary film (student work)
2005	"The Small Corner of the Big World" (student work)
2007	"Black and white" documentary film
2008	"The Camp is Our House, We are the Owners" documentary film
2015	"Plastic surgery"
2016	"Azature"

=== Music videos ===
Year	Singer	Song	Notes			
2009	Hasmik Karapetyan	"For Your Love"				
2010	André	"Don’t Let"				
2010	Arpi Gabrielyan	"The Love"				
2010	Arame	"She is from a Tale"				
2010	Erik Karapetyan	"La la le"				
2010	Arame	"Beauty"				
2012	Silva Hakobyan	"It is Too Late"				
2012	Erik Karapetyan	"Unavailable"				
2012	Silva Hakobyan	"Mrutik"				
2013	Silva Hakobyan, MIC	"Don’t Apologize"	, shot in Los Angeles			
2013	Erik Karapetyan	"I wish I knew"				
2013	Silva Hakobyan	"Leave A Light On"				
2013	Emmy	"Rainbow"				
2013	Silva Hakobyan	"The Bride"				
2013	Razmik Amyan	"Yaro jan"				
2013	André, Lena Ghazaryan	"I Want to Hate You"				
2014	Lilit Hovhannisyan, Vache Amaryan	"Don't Kill Me"				
2014	Ani Christy	"Believe Me"	, shot in Los Angeles			
2014	Ani Christy, DJ Therapist	"Well Tell Me"	, shot in Los Angeles			
2014	Ani Christy	"Hey You"	, shot in Los Angeles			
2014	Betty	"People Of The Sun"	, Junior Eurovision 2014			
2014	Vladimir Arzumanyan	"I’m Coming"				
2014	Lilit Karapetyan	"Let Me Live"				
2014	Silva Hakobyan, Azat Hakobyan	"A Story"				
2015	Narine Dovlatyan	"Al Aylugh"	, Komitas			
2015	Emmy	"Mirror"				
2015	Erik Karapetyan	"Love"				
2015	Mika	"Love"	, Junior Eurovision 2014			
2015	Armenchik	"Father"				
2017	Erik Karapetyan	"Universe"				
2017	Artsvik	"Fly with Me"	, Eurovision 2017			
2017	Christine Pepelyan	"Little by Little"	, shot in Paris			
2017	Iveta Mukuchyan	"Hayastan jan"				
2017	Noro, Arminka	"Love and Years"				
2018	Sevak Khanagyan	"Wind"	, Eurovision 2018			
2018	Nune Yesayan	"I Want"				
2018	Arminka	"Give me"				
2019	Srbuk	"Walking out"	, Eurovision 2019			
2019	Iveta Mukuchyan	"My lovely Armenia"				
2020	Athena Manoukian	"Chains On You"	, Originally for Eurovision 2020, featured in replacement entertainment after event was cancelled.			
2020	Erik Karapetyan	"Siro Pandemia Album"	Directed 5 music videos on songs "Qani or Qani gisher", "'Im u Qo", "Lovi Lovi", "Qani Kam", "Sirts Tsavi",			
2020	All Artists	"Mez vochinch chi haghti"	Featuring Sevak Amroyan, Sevak Khanaghyan, Iveta Mukuchyan, Sona Rubenyan, Srbuk, Gor Sujyan, Arthur KHachents			
2020	Sevak Amroyan	"Hramanatar"		2021	Sona Sarkisyan	"Твой Ангел"
2021	Sevak Amroyan	"Im Yerazum"				
2021	Iveta Mukuchyan	"Mec Haykakan Harsaniq"				
2021	Arpi Gabrielyan, Mihran Tsarukyan	"Imn es"				
2021	Emmy	"Kamurjner"				
2024	Ladaniva	"Jako"	Eurovision 2024			

=== Armenia in Eurovision and Junior Eurovision Song Contests ===
Year	Contest	Singer	Song
2014	Junior Eurovision 2014	Betty	"People of the Sun"
2015	Junior Eurovision 2015	Mika	"Love"
2017	Eurovision Song Contest 2017	Artsvik	"Fly with me"
2018	Eurovision Song Contest 2018	Sevak Khanaghyan	"Qami"
2019	Eurovision Song Contest 2019	Srbuk	"Walking Out"
2020	Eurovision Song Contest 2020	Athena Manoukian	"Chains on You"
2021	Junior Eurovision Song Contest 2021	Maléna	"Qami Qami"
2024	Eurovision Song Contest 2024	Ladaniva	"Jako"

== Performances ==
Year	Artist	Contest
2019	Srbuk	Eurovision Song Contest 2019
2019	Karina Ignatyan	Junior Eurovision 2019
2024	Ladaniva	Eurovision Song Contest 2024

=== Depi Evratesil (Armenia's national selection for Eurovision and Junior Eurovision artists) ===
Year	Artist
2011	Vladimir Arzumanyan
2018	Sevak KHanaghyan
2019	Karina Ignatyan
2020	Athena Manoukian

== Concerts and ceremonies ==
Year	Name	Country/Place
2010	Armenian National Selection of Junior Eurovision Song Contest	Armenia, Yerevan
2016	Martin Mkrtchyan live in concert	Dolby Theatre, Los Angeles
2016	Erik Karapetyan Live in Convert	Karen Demirchyan Complex, Yerevan
2017	Saro Tovmasyan Live in Concert	Karen Demirchyan Complex, Yerevan
2018	Hripsime Hakobyan Live in Concert	Karen Demirchyan Complex, Yerevan
2018	Noro Live in Concert	Dolby Theatre, Los Angeles, California
2019	Mihran Tsarukyan Live in concert	Karen Demirchyan Complex, Yerevan
2019	CONIFA European Football Cup	Artsakh, Stepanakert
2019	"Anahit" Armenian Film Academy Awards	Armenia, Yerevan
2020	"Heroe of Our Time" dedicated to the 29th anniversary of Independence of Armenia	
2020	"May 9" Victory day concert program on Armenian Public TV	Armenia, Yerevan
2021	"Artavazd" Armenian National Theatrical Awards	Armenia, Yerevan
2021	"Koriz" Awards	Armenia, Yerevan

== Awards ==
- 2006 – "I Am" international film festival, Special Award for "The Small Corner of The Big World" film
- 2010 – 21st Century television award for the music video of Andre's "Don't Let" song as The Best Music Video
- 2010 – "Top 10" award for the music video of Arpi Gabrielyan's "Love" song as The Best Music Video
- 2012 – "Top 10" award for the music video of Erik Karapetyan's "Unreal" song as The Best Music Video
- 2013 – 21st Century television award for the music video of Andre's "I Want to Hate You" song as the Best Music Video
- 2014 – World Armenian Entertainment Awards for the music video of Andre's "I Want to Hate You" song as the Best Music Video
- 2016 – Pan Armenian Entertainment Awards for Erik Karapetyan's "Live in Concert" as The Best Concert of The Year
- 2016 – Pan Armenian Entertainment Awards for the music video of Armenchik's "Father" song as The Best Music Video
- 2017 – Europe Armenian Music Awards 2017 for Benefice program as The Best TV Program
