= Benefis =

- Genre: Talk show
- Presented by: Avet Barseghyan
- Country of origin: Armenia
- No. of episodes: 29

Production
- Production location: Yerevan
- Running time: 80-107 minutes

Original release
- Network: Armenia 1
- Release: September 17, 2016 – July 29, 2017

Benefis is a weekly one-hour talk show hosted by Armenian presenter Avet Barseghyan, and airing on Yerevan-based Public Television company of Armenia. The show featured one-on-one interviews with notable residents of Armenia, their best performances, and interesting facts about their lives and creative paths. The talk-show aired every Sunday.

== Episodes ==
=== Episode 1 ===
The episode aired on September 17, 2016. The talk-show was about Armenian singer-songwriter Hayko.

=== Episode 2 ===
The episode aired on September 24, 2016. The talk-show was about Armenian singer Silva Hakobyan.

=== Episode 3 ===
The episode aired on October 1, 2016. The talk-show was about Armenian singer Arame.

=== Episode 4 ===
The episode aired on October 8, 2016. The talk-show was about Armenian singer-songwriter Forsh.

=== Episode 5 ===
The episode aired on October 15, 2016. The talk-show was about Armenian singer Varduhi Vardanyan, who died in a car accident on Sevan - Martuni highway on October 15, 2006.

=== Episode 6 ===
The episode aired on October 22, 2016. The talk-show was about Armenian singer Razmik Amyan, his friend Hayko was also there.

=== Episode 7 ===
The episode aired on October 29, 2016. The talk-show was about Armenian singer Nune Yesayan.

=== Episode 8 ===
The episode aired on November 5, 2016. The talk-show was about Armenian singer Hasmik Karapetyan.

=== Episode 9 ===
The episode aired on November 19, 2016. The talk-show was about Armenian singer Erik.

=== Episode 10 ===
The episode aired on November 26, 2016. The talk-show was about Armenian singer Arminka.

=== Episode 11 ===
The episode aired on December 3, 2016. The talk-show was about Armenian singer Emmy.

=== Episode 12 ===
The episode aired on December 17, 2016. The talk-show was about Armenian singer SONA.

=== Episode 13 ===
The episode aired on December 24, 2016. The talk-show was about Armenian singer-songwriter Artur Grigoryan.

=== Episode 14 ===
The episode aired on February 11, 2017. The talk-show was about Armenian singer Arsen Safaryan.

=== Episode 15 ===
The episode aired on February 18, 2017. The talk-show was about Armenian singer Shushan Petrosyan.

=== Episode 16 ===
The episode aired on March 4, 2017. The talk-show was about Armenian singer Zaruhi Babayan.

=== Episode 17 ===
The episode aired on March 11, 2017. The talk-show was about Armenian singer-songwriter Arsen Grigoryan.

=== Episode 18 ===
The episode aired on March 25, 2017. The talk-show was about Armenian singer Christine Pepelyan.

=== Episode 19 ===
The episode aired on April 8, 2017. The talk-show was about Armenian singer and presenter Aram MP3.

=== Episode 20 ===
The episode aired on March 25, 2017. The talk-show was about Armenian singer-songwriter Edgar Gyanjumyan.

=== Episode 21 ===
The episode aired on April 8, 2017. The talk-show was about Armenian singer-songwriter Leyla Saribekyan.

=== Episode 22 ===
The episode aired on April 29, 2017. The talk-show was about Armenian singer Andre.

=== Episode 23 ===
The episode aired on May 20, 2017. The talk-show was about Armenian musician and actress Iveta Mukuchyan. The show was also featuring Gohar Gasparyan, Hayk Petrosyan.

=== Episode 24 ===
The episode aired on May 27, 2017. The talk-show was about Armenian singer Elvina Makaryan, who died in a car accident on Los Angeles on July 9, 2007.

=== Episode 25 ===
The episode aired on June 3, 2017. The talk-show was about Armenian singer Sona Shahgeldyan.

=== Episode 26 ===
The episode aired on June 24, 2017. The talk-show was about Armenian singer Arman Aghajanyan.

=== Episode 27 ===
The episode aired on July 1, 2017. The talk-show was about Armenian singer-songwriter Ani Christy.

=== Episode 28 ===
The episode aired on July 8, 2017. The talk-show was about Armenian singer-songwriter Alla Levonyan.

=== Episode 29 ===
The last episode of the series aired on July 29, 2017 at 22:20 pm. The talk-show was about Armenian musician Avet Barseghyan (the presenter of the show). The episode was hosted by many Armenian well-known artists, such as Aram Mp3 and Gohar Gasparyan.

== Awards and nominations ==
Year	Award	Category	City	Result
2017	Armenian Europe Music Awards	Best Music Project	Paris	Won
