= The Voice of Armenia =

Armenian television singing competition

- Armenian: Հայաստանի ձայնը Hayastani Dzayne
- Genre: Reality competition
- Created by: John de Mol
- Judges: Nune Yesayan (2017); Arame (2017); Sevak Khanagyan (2017); Sofi Mkheyan (2012–13, 2017); Christine Pepelyan (2013); Michael Poghosyan (2013); Shushan Petrosyan (2013); Hayko (2013–14); Sona (2012–13, 2014); Armen Martirosyan (2014); Eva Rivas (2014); Tata Simonyan (2012–13); Arto Tunçboyaciyan (2012-13)
- Country of origin: Armenia
- Original language: Armenian
- No. of seasons: 4

Production
- Production locations: Yerevan, Armenia

Original release
- Network: Armenia TV
- Release: 3 November 2012 – 24 December 2017

Related
- Hay Superstar; X-Factor (Armenia)

The Voice of Armenia (Armenian: Հայաստանի Ձայնը pronounced Hayastani Dzayne) is an Armenian television singing competition created by John de Mol. The first season was broadcast on Armenia TV. The show premiered in late 2012 and continued until 2017. The rules of the show are based on The Voice of Holland and The Voice (U.S.) and include blind auditions (in Armenian Կույր լսումներ), 'wild card' round, battle phase (in Armenian Մենամարտ), and live rounds (in Armenian Գալա համերգներ).

The Voice of Armenia is open not only to artists from Armenia, but also to Armenians from the Armenian diaspora including Russia. As of September 2025, there is no information about a fifth season.

== Coaches Timeline ==
Coaches	Season			
Coaches	1	2	3	4
Sona				
Tata Simonyan				
Sofi Mkheyan				
Arto Tunçboyaciyan				
Michael Poghosyan				
Hayko				
Christine Pepelyan				
Shushan Petrosyan				
Armen Martirosyan				
Eva Rivas				
Arame				
Nune Yesayan				
Sevak Khanagyan				

== Series overview ==
Հայաստանի ձայնը series overview
Season	First aired	Last aired	Winner	Runner-up	Third place	Fourth place	Winning coach	Hosts	Coaches (chairs' order)			
Season	First aired	Last aired	Winner	Runner-up	Third place	Fourth place	Winning coach	Hosts	1	2	3	4
1	November 3, 2012	March 4, 2013	Mary Mnjoyan	Narek Makaryan	Gayané Arzumanian	Iskuhi Hovhannisyan	Sona	Hakob Hakobyan, Hrach Muradyan, Nazeni Hovhannisyan, Rafael Ghazanchyan, Arsen Grigoryan	Arto	Sofi	Tata	Sona
2	October 6, 2013	December 8, 2013	Anna Khanchalyan	Arevik Grigoryan	Qristina Mangasaryan	Vigen Aharonyan	Christine Pepelyan	Hakob Hakobyan, Hrach Muradyan, Nazeni Hovhannisyan, Rafael Ghazanchyan, Arsen Grigoryan	Michael	Christine	Hayko	Shushan
3	October 4, 2014	December 29, 2014	Raisa Avanesyan	Meline Galoyan	Erna Mirzoyan	Vahe Aleqsanyan	Sona	Hakob Hakobyan, Hrach Muradyan, Nazeni Hovhannisyan, Rafael Ghazanchyan, Arsen Grigoryan	Armen	Eva	Hayko	Sona
4	September 30, 2017	December 24, 2017	Hayk Gulyan	Tigran Karapetyan	Anna Danielyan	Christina Khalatova	Nune Yesayan	N. Hovhannisyan, Ara Kazaryan	Sofi	Arame	Nune	Sevak

== Season details ==
=== Season 1 (2012–2013) ===
The judges of the first season (2012–2013) were Sona, Tata Simonyan, Sofi Mkheyan and Arto Tunçboyaciyan.

Competitors' table
– Winner
– Runner-up
– Third
– Fourth
– Eliminated

Team	Acts					
Sona	Hovhannes Antryasyan	Mart Babayan	Jivan Khachatryan	Aida Kalantaryan	Anna Papyan	Mary (Masha) Mnjoyan (52.9%)
Sofi Mkheyan	Nelly Mesropyan	Nshan Karabetyan	Arminé Martirossyan	Frik Rostomyan	Alina Kirakissyan	Narek Makaryan (25.7%)
Arto Tunçboyaciyan	Zemma Karabetyan	Grigor Kyokchyan	Laura Tigranyan	Ovsanna Khublaryan	Srbuhi Hovhannisyan	Gayané Arzumanian (14.9%)
Tata Simonyan	Gurgen Sayatyan	Vladimir Boghossyan	Aydin Davoudi	Gevorg Martirosyan	Ani Sahakyan	Iskuhi Hovhannisyan (6.5%)

The winner was Mary "Masha" Mnjoyan from Team Sona with 52.9% of the popular vote in the final broadcast on 30 March 2013. The runner-up was Narek Makaryan from Team Sofi with 25.7% of the vote. Gayané Arzumanian from Team Arto came third and Iskuhi Hovhannisyan from Team Tata fourth. In the final, four Armenian contestants from Russian Voice Golos were invited to perform in the Armenian version. They were Artyom Kacharyan, Edward Khachatryan, Gayane Zakharova, and Margarita Pozoyan.

=== Season 2 (2013) ===
The judges of the second season (2013–2014) were Shushan Petrosyan, Hayko, Christine Pepelyan and Michael Poghosyan.

Competitors' table
– Winner
– Runner-up
– Third
– Fourth
– Eliminated

Team	Acts		
Christine Pepelyan	Leona	Anahit Shahbazyan	Anna Khanchalyan
Michael Poghosyan	Chinar Isoyan	Syuzanna Sirekanyan	Arevik Grigoryan
Shushan Petrosyan	Vahe Igityan	Mane Sargsyan	Qristina Mangasaryan
Hayko	Armen Hovhannisyan	Valera Mayromyan	Vigen Aharonyan

=== Season 3 (2014) ===
The coaches of the third season (2014–2015) are Sona, Armen Martirosyan, Eva Rivas, and Hayko.

- 1st place: Raisa Avanesyan (team Sona)
- 2nd place: Meline Galoyan (team Hayko)
- 3rd place: Erna Mirzoyan (team Armen)
- 4th place: Vahe Aleqsanyan (team Eva)

=== Season 4 (2017) ===
Format was back to Armenia after 2 years of break. The broadcaster has changed the website of that talent show. The coaches of the fourth season (2017) are Arame, Nune Yesayan, Sevak Khanaghyan, and Sofi Mkheyan.

Competitors' table
– Winner
– Runner-up
– Third
– Fourth
– Eliminated

Team	Acts		
Sevak Khanaghyan	Mnats Khanagyan	Yeva Abrahamyan	Anna Danielyan
Sofi Mkheyan	Sona Gyulkhasyan	Grigor Davtyan	Christina Khalatova
Arame	Karen Ughuryan	Mash Israyelyan	Tigran Karapetyan
Nune Yesayan	Anahit Hakobyan	Lusine "Soulange" Arutyunova	Hayk Gulyan
