= Sofi Mkheyan =

Armenian singer

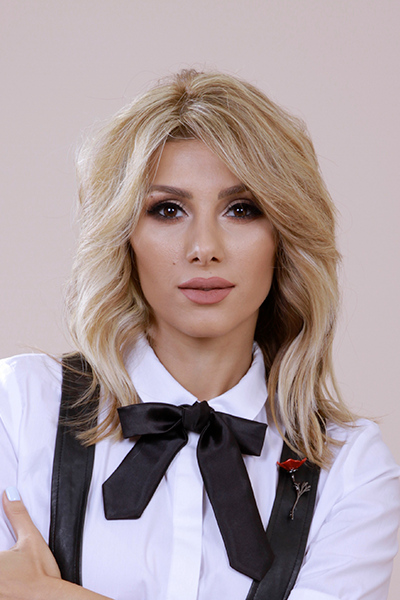
- Sofi Mkheyan

Background information
- Born: April 8, 1984 (age 42); Yerevan, Armenian SSR, Soviet Union
- Occupation: Singer
- Instrument: Vocals
- Years active: 2005–present

Sofi Gagiki Mkheyan (Armenian: Սոֆի Գագիկի Մխեյան, born April 8, 1984) is an Armenian singer and the winner of Best Newcomer award at the Armenian National Music Awards in Yerevan in 2005.

== Early life ==
Mkheyan was born in Yerevan, the daughter of Parliament member Gagik Mkheyan, who previously served as the Vice President of Orinats Yerkir. She has one brother, Gor. She started singing at the Doremi Vocal Studio and later Sayat Music School and Romanos Melikyan Musical College; all three are in Yerevan. She then attended Komitas State Conservatory of Yerevan.

== Career ==
Mkheyan won the Best Newcomer award at the Armenian National Music Awards in 2005; Best Modern Pop Female in 2009; and Best Female Singer in 2010.

As of 2022, she has released 4 albums: Kyanke Qo, Luys Khavarum, 2012, and The Best of Sofi Mkheyan, as well as a number of singles. DerHova is a frequent producer and she has collaborated with singers such as Sirusho and Vigen Hovsepyan. In 2007, "Ore Yev Nerkan", a single later added to Kyange Qo, won the Hit of the Year award in 2007 at the Armenian National Music Awards. She made a music video for Hayastani erge (Armenia's Song), her first patriotic song, in 2012; the video was filmed in both Armenia and Nagorno-Karabakh.

She judged and coached for The Voice of Armenia between 2012 and 2017; fellow judges included Arame, Nune Yesayan, and Sevak Khanagyan.

== Personal life ==
She is politically active and patriotic. In 2020, she participated in a protest against Prime Minister Nikol Pashinyan's decision to sign a peace treaty over the conflict for the Nagorno-Karabakh area.

== Discography ==
=== Albums ===
Year	Title	Songs
2007	Kyanke Qo	""Gitem Kas," "Im Enker," "Karotum Em Kez," "Kyanqe Qo," "Mer Ughinere," "Mshushot Ser," "Nair Im Achqerin," "Ore Ev Nerkan," "Ser," "Arjanie Na (feat. Sirusho)," "Yerevan
2009	Luys Khavarum	"Petq Ches," "Luys Khavarum," "Asa," "Mievnuyn E," "Lur E Sers," "Vortegh Gtnem," "Havatum Em," "Chem Toghni," "Mot Kam Heru," "Luys Khavarum (Remix)"
2012	2012	"2012," "Uzum Em Khosel," "Hachakh Jpta," "Mama," "Hayastani Yerge," "Karoti Yeraz,""Yerknayin," "Chanachir," "Game Over," "Mega Mix," "2012 (Instrumental)"
2017	The Best of Sofi Mkheyan	"Hamadzayn Em," "Siro Ton," "Mi Qich (feat. Vigen Hovsepyan)," "Leblebijineri Khmberge," "Hayastan," "Erazum," "Mama," "Deghin Gnacq," "Igrushka," "2012," "Petq Ches," "Havatum Em," "Luys Khavarum," "Hajax Jpta," "Chanachir," "Karoti Eraz," "Erknayin," "Uzum Em Khosel," "Mot Kam Heru," "Vortegh Gtnem," "Game Over," "Mega Mix"

=== Singles ===
Year	Title	Notes
2006	"Mer Sere Erbek Chi Ceranum (feat. Edgar Karapetyan)"	From Serundneri Erte - Gala Hamerg
2006	"Volor Molor"	From Shining Armenian Stars Vol. 10
2009	Luys Khavarum	
2010	"Chknagh Yeraz"	From Yerg Yergoc, Vol. 1
2010	"Du Kas"	From Yerg Yergoc, Vol. 1
2015	"Harazar Im"	From Armenian Stars 9
2015	"Im Srti Mayraqaghaq Yerevan"	From Songs About Yerevan
2016	"Mi Qich (feat. Vigen Hovsepyan)"	
2018	"Tesilq (feat. Nazeni Hovhannisyan)"	
2018	"Rehan"	
2018	"Chem Uzum"	
2017	"Naz Ouni"	From Shining Armenian Stars Vol. 9
2019	'"Mi Qich El"	
2020	"Khorotik Morotik (feat. Vigen Hovsepyan & DerHova)"	
2020	"Bella ciao (Armenian Version)"	
2020	"Aparan"	
2020	"Menak Ches"	
2021	"Yerjankutyan Arcunqner"	
2021	"Gna Galis Em"	
