= Sona Rubenyan =

Armenian singer and songwriter (born 1993)

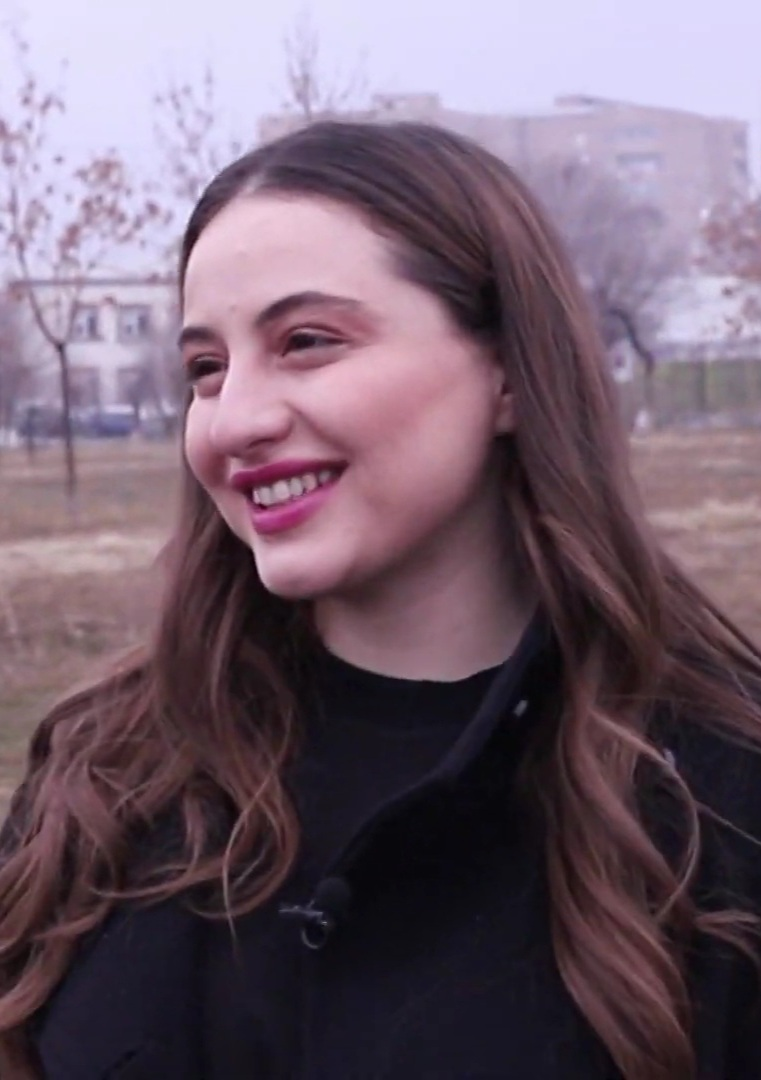
- Rubenyan in 2019

Background information
- Born: December 14, 1993 (age 32); Yerevan, Armenia
- Genres: Pop
- Occupations: Singer, songwriter
- Instruments: Vocals, piano
- Years active: 2011–present

Sona Rubenyan (Armenian: Սոնա Հակոբի Ռուբենյան, born December 14, 1993) is an Armenian singer and songwriter. She is best known for winning the fifth edition of Hay Superstar.

== Career ==
In 2011, Rubenyan became the winner of the fifth edition of Hay Superstar, which is the Armenian version of the British television hit show Pop Idol. In 2014, she also represented Armenia at the New Wave international contest in Jūrmala.

Since 2016, Rubenyan has been collaborating with Garik Papoyan as a duo under the name Garik & Sona, releasing several singles including "Lusin", "Esor Urbat e", "Nino" and more. In November 2020, amid the Second Nagorno-Karabakh War, she was featured on a charity single titled "Mez vochinch chi haghti" (Nothing Will Win Us) along with Arthur Khachents, Iveta Mukuchyan, Gor Sujyan, Srbuk, Sevak Khanagyan and Sevak Amroyan.

== Personal life ==
In December 2015, Rubenyan got engaged, but ended the engagement in 2016. In July 2021, she announced her new engagement. She then married in November 2021.

== Discography ==
=== Singles ===
- Jamanakn E (2015)
- Ashnan Serenad (2015)
- Mayrik (2016)
- Artsakh (2016)
- Aprelu Chap Hamar (2018)
- Mer Tnic Nor Tun (2019)
- Lav Orery Et Kgan (feat. Karen Sevak, Arame, Saro Tovmasyan, Nune Yesayan, Hripsime Hakobyan, Erik Karapetyan, Aram Mp3, Garik Papoyan, Roland Gasparyan and Me Project) (2020)
- We Are The World (feat. Kami Friends, Arpi, Aram Mp3, Garik Papoyan, Roland Gasparyan, Gor Sujyan, Karina Arustamyan, Vardan Zadoyan, Aghvan Papoyan, Mish Amiryan, Anush Harutunyan, Sona Varpetyan and Anushik Alaverdyan) (2020)
- Im Quyr (2020)
- Bales Qni (2020)
- Mez vochinch chi haghti (Nothing Will Win Us) (feat. Arthur Khachents, Iveta Mukuchyan, Gor Sujyan, Srbuk, Sevak Khanagyan and Sevak Amroyan) (2020)
- Siro Nver (feat. Aram Mp3) (2021)
- Qez Het Hayrik (2021)
- The World is in a Hurry for Good (Russian: Мир Спешит к Добру) (feat. Aram Mp3, Erik Karapetyan, ANIVAR, Mariam Merabova, Lilit Hovhannisyan, and Margarita Pozoyan) (2021)
- Yekar (2021)
- Hors Aghjikn Em (2022)
- Yes Qez Het (2022)
- 4 Yerazanq (2023)
- Mi Gna (feat. Kami Friends) (2023)
- Arajins (2023)
- Verev (2023)
- Hambuyri My Mej (feat. Vahag Rush) (2023)
- Patilner (2023)
- Ari Ari (2024)
- Im Aghjik (2024)
- Alo (2024)
- Bari Or (feat. Artem Valter) (2024)
- Na (2025)
- Vardavary Galis E (2025)
- Bari Luys (2025)
- Chanaparhecir Indz Tun (2025)

=== Garik & Sona ===
- Lusin (2017)
- Baleni (2018)
- Esor Urbat E (2019)
- Hamayak (2019)
- Garun A (2020)
- Mayro (2020)
- Sari Aghjik (2020)
- Bingyol (2021)
- Ghapama (2021)
- Kaqavik (2021)
- Lorke (2021)
- Mute Enkel A (2021)
- Qamin Zana (2021)
- Shirkhani Par (2021)
- Strid Banalin (2021)
- Datark (2022)
- Mashinen (2022)
- Wake Up Harsner (2022)
- Ov Sirun Sirun (2023)
- En Um Amanorn E (2025)

== Awards and achievements ==
Year	Award	Category	Nominated work	Result	Ref
2014	New Wave	Audience Choice	Herself	Won	
2018	Swallow Music Awards	Hit of the Year	"Lusin" (Garik & Sona)	Won	
