= Sevak Amroyan =

Armenian singer (born 1990)

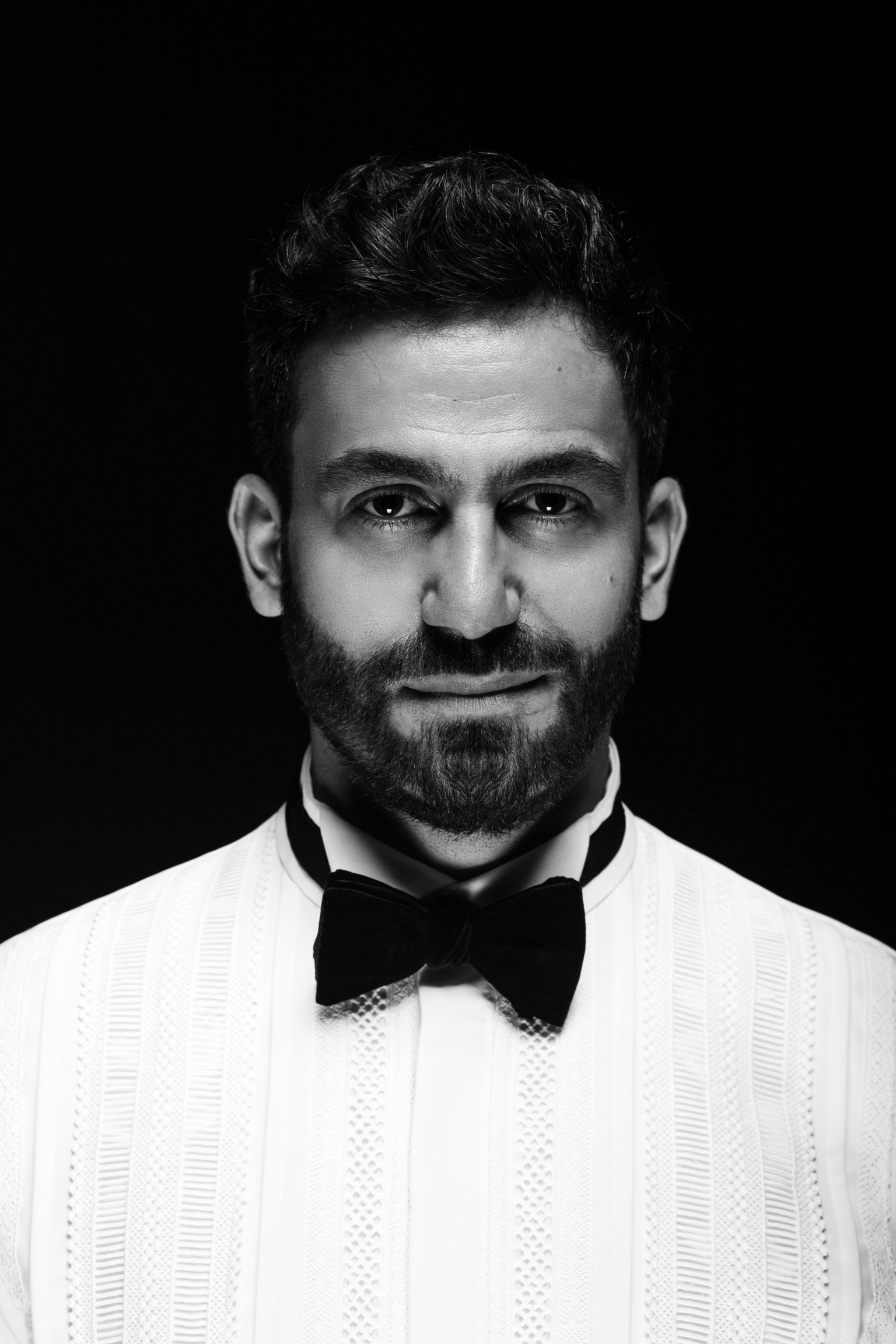
- Amroyan in 2020

Background information
- Born: July 10, 1990 (age 35); Yerevan, Armenian SSR, Soviet Union
- Genres: Folk
- Occupation: Singer
- Instrument: Vocals
- Years active: 2007–present

Sevak Petrosi Amroyan (Armenian: Սևակ Պետրոսի Ամրոյան; born July 10, 1990) is an Armenian singer, who is best known as the winner of Shant TV's folk music competition Joghovrdakan Yergich. Amroyan has released three albums so far, El Yetdardz Chka (2016), Yarkhushta (2020), and Sarvor Akhper (2022)

== Early life ==
Amroyan was born in the capital Yerevan, but grew up in the village of Proshyan, Kotayk Province, where he went to school.

== Career ==
Amroyan came to prominence in 2007, after winning the first season of Shant TV's folk music competition Joghovrdakan ergich (Folk Singer). Since then he has released multiple singles such as "Akhpers u es", "Yarkhushta" and "Gini lits" with millions of views on YouTube. In 2015, he recorded the song "Adana" with Mher Mesropyan amid the 100th anniversary of the Armenian genocide, with the music video being shot in the Genocide Memorial in Yerevan. In 2016, Amroyan released his debut album, El Yetdardz Chka. One of the songs from the album, "Im annman yar" featuring Nune Yesayan, received an award at Armenia TV's Song of the Year Awards in 2017. In 2019, he was chosen as one of the four judges for Shant TV's Azgayin ergich (National Singer) music competition.

In August 2020, his second album Yarkhushta was released. The album's title refers to the Armenian martial dance Yarkhushta. In November 2020, amid the Nagorno-Karabakh war he was featured on a charity single titled "Mez vochinch chi haghti" (Nothing Will Win Us) along with Arthur Khachents, Iveta Mukuchyan, Gor Sujyan, Srbuk, Sevak Khanagyan and Sona Rubenyan, produced by DerHova. Following the end of the war, he was featured on another collaboration track along with Mihran Tsarukyan, Hayko and Erik Karapetyan titled "Heros zinvor" dedicated to Armenian soldiers.

In June 2022, Amroyan was featured on the single "Amber" by Armenian-American singer Serj Tankian.

== Musical style ==
He is known for his folk songs, as well as patriotic songs about Armenia and its army. While talking about singing in pop genre in an interview, Amroyan said: "No, I'm not thinking about it. Maybe there will be some collaborations, but that's all. Of course, folk music is not as popular in Armenia as pop, but I hope that the situation will improve. Every effort should be made to make folk music a priority".

== Personal life ==
On December 8, 2021, Amroyan was married.

== Discography ==
=== Studio albums ===
- El Yetdardz Chka (2016)

Song	Authors / Arranger
"Hayots Martikner"	Vigen Hovsepyan / Garegin Araqelyan (arrangement)
"Yar Boyid Mernem"	traditional folk song / Garegin Araqelyan (arrangement)
"Hayer Miatseq"	Gusan Haykazun / Garegin Araqelyan (arrangement)
"Mi Latsatsni"	Silva Kaputikyan, Vache Hovsepyan / Garegin Araqelyan (arrangement)
"Arjani" (duet with Karnig Sarkissian)	Edmond Makaryan / DerHova (arrangement)
"Lusnyak Gisher"	Nikoghayos Tigranyan / Garegin Araqelyan (arrangement)
"Im Annman Yar" (duet with Nune Yesayan)	Anush Araqelyan / Mushegh Mayilyan (arrangement)
"Mi Morana Qo Azgin"	Levon Gatrjyan / Armen "Brde" Sargsyan (arrangement)
"Gini Lits"	traditional folk song / Garegin Araqelyan (arrangement)
"Ov Surb Mayrer"	Gusan Ashot / Garegin Araqelyan (arrangement)
"Akhpers Ou Yes"	Ashot Begoyan, Zareh Qeshishian (development) / DerHova (arrangement)

- Yarkhushta (2020)

Song	Authors
"Zguysh Khosir Hayastanum"	Gevorg Emin, Zareh Qeshishian / Garik Gevorgi (arrangement)
"Jampord Em"	Gusan Sheram / Garegin Araqelyan (arrangement)
"Yarkhushta"	Avet Barseghyan, DerHova / DerHova (arrangement)
"Otarutyun" (duet with Rosy Armen)	Avetiq Isahakyan, Ashugh Jivani / Armen "Brde" Sargsyan (arrangement)
"Vreje Srtum"	Ara Sahakyan / Garegin Araqelyan (arrangement)
"Anjigyar"	Gusan Ashot / Garik Gevorgi (arrangement)
"Im Khaghagh Yerekon E Hima" (duet with Andre Simonyan)	Vahan Teryan, Levon Abrahamyan
"Piti Gnanq"	Gusan Haykazun / Garegin Araqelyan (arrangement)
"Krunk"	Komitas / Garegin Araqelyan (arrangement)
"Zinvori Mor Yerge" (feat. Arpi and Vardan Badalyan)	Poghos Natanyan, Makar Ekmalyan / Garegin Araqelyan (arrangement)

- Sarvor Akhper (2022)

Song	Authors
"Im Yerazum"	NA / Garik Gevorgi (arrangement)
"Balui Laz Par"	NA / Garik Gevorgi (arrangement)
"Nazani"	NA / Garik Gevorgi (arrangement)
"Sarvor Akhper"	NA / Garik Gevorgi (arrangement)
"Muraz Dzi"	NA / Garik Gevorgi (arrangement)
"Nubar"	NA / Garik Gevorgi (arrangement)
"Gorani"	NA / Garik Gevorgi (arrangement)
"Khalvare Khalvarin"	NA / Garik Gevorgi (arrangement)
"Lokan Berd"	NA / Garik Gevorgi (arrangement)
"Drdo"	NA / Garik Gevorgi (arrangement)

- Acoustica (2024)

Song	Authors
"Sareri Hovin Mernem"	NA
"Zepyuri Nman"	Ashugh Shahen
"Sari Sirun Yar"	Ashugh Ashot
"Achqd Khumar"	Ashugh Sheram
"Hayreniqis Jure"	Ashugh Jivani

== Accolades ==
- 2007: Shant TV's Folk Singer show winner
- 2017: Armenia TV's Song of the Year award for "Im annman yar" (with Nune Yesayan)
- 2019: Armenia TV's Song of the Year award for "Yarkhushta"
