= Station (TV series) =

- Կայարան
- Genre: Drama; Melodrama
- Written by: Anahit Mkhitaryan
- Starring: Varujan Margaryan; Kristine Kiuyumchyan; Armen Elbakyan; Aleksandr Babasyan; Vardan Hovsepyan; Eva Khachatryan; Anna Dovlatyan
- Country of origin: Armenia
- Original language: Armenian
- No. of seasons: 1
- No. of episodes: 307

Production
- Producer: Elena Arshakyan
- Production locations: Yerevan, Armenia
- Running time: 35-40 minutes

Original release
- Network: ATV, Panarmenian TV
- Release: September 26, 2016

Station (Armenian: Կայարան, Kaiaran) is an Armenian drama television series, that premiered on ATV on September 26, 2016. Since then, the series airs from Mondays to Fridays, following another television series, If I Find You, at 23:00 in Armenia and at 8:00 pm in California.

The series takes mostly place in Yerevan.
