= Tata Simonyan =

- Born: Albert Simonyan; December 5, 1962 (age 63); Yerevan, Armenian SSR, Soviet Union
- Genres: Pop; rabiz
- Occupations: Singer; songwriter
- Instrument: Vocals
- Years active: 1980–present

Albert Alberti Simonyan (Armenian: Ալբերտ Ալբերտի Սիմոնյան; born December 5, 1962), better known by his stage name Tata (Armenian: Թաթա), is an Armenian singer-songwriter, widely known among the Armenian diaspora.

Tata received the title of the Honored Artist of Armenia in 2006, and was nominated for "King of Pop" in Moscow in 2008. To date, Tata has put on performances to audiences in the U.S., Canada, Australia, the Netherlands, Belgium, the United Kingdom, France, Spain, Greece, the Middle East and 45 cities in Russia. Tata has also played in several films.

== Biography ==
Tata was born on December 5, 1962 in Yerevan, the capital of Armenia (then part of the Soviet Union). In 1977, he graduated from V. Terian Secondary School No. 60. During the school years, he studied in the accordion department of the music school.

Tata started his career in 1980 with the "Cilicia" ensemble. In 1991 he recorded his first album, Yerekon Idjav. He participated in the "Yerevan-Moscow Transit" project, where he performed with Russian bands "Otpetie Moshenniki" and "Reflex". In 2006 he was awarded the title of the Honored Artist of the Republic of Armenia. In 2008 his "Tata" production center together with Armenia TV implemented the "National Star" project, which he was the artistic director of.

Tata has released eight albums for which he wrote the music and lyrics. He has recorded duets with Lyubov Uspenskaya, Anatoly Dneprov, Kristina Orbakaite, and Eva Rivas.

From November 2012 to April 2013, he was the coach of the Voice of Armenia project.

== Discography ==
=== Studio albums ===
- Yerekon Idjav (1991)
- Tata & Asbarez (1997)
- Te ach, te dzakh (1998)
- Ov e na (1999)
- Shaba-daba-dash (2001)
- Andzrev e yekel (2003)
- Tevavor qaminer (2006)
- Amenalave du es (2009)

=== Live albums ===
- The Best of Tata: Live in Concert (1999)
- 10 Tari Anc (2008)
- Tata Simonyan’s Star Friends (2009)
- Live Concert in Moscow (2014)

== Filmography ==
- 1996 – Our Yard
- 1998 – Our Yard 2
- 2003 – Star of Love
- 2005 – Our Yard 3

== Awards and achievements ==
Here is chronologically the awards Tata has received so far.

Year	Award	Category	City	Result
2015	Armenian Pulse Music Awards	Best Dance Song	Yerevan	Won
2010	Tashir Music Awards	Best Album	Moscow	Won
2001	Armenian Music Awards	Favorite Singer Voted by the People	Glendale	Won
