= Varduhi Vardanyan =

Varduhi Vardanyan Վարդուհի Վարդանյան
- Born: Varduhi Vardanyan; June 27, 1976; Yerevan, Armenian SSR, Soviet Union
- Died: October 15, 2006 (aged 30) Sevan-Martuni highway, Armenia
- Genres: Pop, Jazz
- Instrument: Piano
- Labels: Armenian Music Centre
- Website: varduhivardanyan.am

Varduhi Rubeni Vardanyan (Armenian: Վարդուհի Ռուբենի Վարդանյան; June 26, 1976 – October 15, 2006) was an Armenian singer. She participated in many international song contests and won many awards and was awarded best singer of Armenia.

== Early life ==
Varduhi Vardanyan was born on June 26, 1976, in Yerevan, Armenia. She is one of three children in the family.

Since her early childhood, she had a passion towards singing. She used everything similar to microphone to sing. Eventually it became unique way of self-education for her. She had a 96-page copybook containing her favorite pioneer songs.

In 1983, a music group was established at her school, where she started to take classes. Later on the music group was named after Ashot Bznuni.

In 1986, Vardanyan started to attend Naira Gyurjinyan's vocal group to improve her skills. Afterwards she studied at the musical school named after Alexandr Spendiaryan. During these years she developed her very own musical taste. Her dream was to sing with Whitney Houston.

== Education ==
- 1992 – graduated from the 8th high school named after Alexander Pushkin.
- 1993 – graduated from musical school
- 1993 – entered Linguistic University named after Valery Bryusov at the section of English language and politics.
- 1994 – entered State Song Theatre and since 1995 she has worked there,
- 1994-1999 – after studying at university, she started to work as a teacher of the English language.
- 2003 – graduated from Yerevan State Conservatory named after Komitas.

== Career ==
- 1994 – together with the group "Jazz-Pop" participated in international contest held in Sverdlovsk and got Grand Prix.
- 1995 – started to work at Armenian state music theatre.
- 1996 – participated to the contest of young singers "Yalta - Moscow" transit, where she got a prize for the best performance.
- 1999 – she was awarded best singer of Armenia.
- 2000 – in the contest "Discovery" held in Bulgaria she got Grand Prix and an additional Audience Choice Award.
- 2000 – in Macedonia she again got Grand Prix.
- 2000 – participated in International Festival of Arts “Slavianski Bazaar" and got second prize.
- 2001 – participated in international festival "Море друзей 2001" in Yalta and got second prize.

== Death ==
She died on October 15, 2006, in a car accident at Sevan - Martuni highway. She is buried at the Tokhmakh cemetery. After her death, many Armenian programs were dedicated to her, including Benefis, Half-Opened Windows, and The Mechanics of Happiness.

== Family ==
- Husband: Aram Avoyan
- Child: Ruben Avoyan, born in 1998

== Discography ==
=== Studio albums ===
- Disarray (2003), (2006)

=== Posthumous ===
- Only you (Russian: Только ты) (2007)
- 13 songs dedicated to Varduhi Vardanyan (2008)
- You are mine (Armenian: Իմն ես) (2011)
