= Razmik Amyan =

Armenian singer (born 1982)

- Born: January 8, 1982 (age 44); Stepanakert, Nagorno-Karabakh Autonomous Oblast, Soviet Union
- Education: Komitas State Conservatory of Yerevan
- Occupation: Singer
- Years active: 1998–present
- Height: 171 cm (5 ft 7 in)
- Musical career
- Label: AM Production
- Website: razmikamyan.am

Razmik Garniki Amyan (Armenian: Ռազմիկ Գառնիկի Ամյան; born January 8, 1982) is an Armenian singer-songwriter.

== Career ==
In 2017, Amyan was awarded with the title of Honored Artist of Armenia upon the decree of the Armenian President Serzh Sargsyan. He was also named the singer of the year at the World Armenian Entertainment Awards in 2014 and at the Armenian Golden Star Awards in 2010. He performed in the Toronto A.C.C. Summerfest in 2017 alongside other notable Armenian singers.

He has released numerous music videos including "Yeraguyn" in March 2012, the animated "Musical Alphabet" in December 2007 and "Pstik Papan" in August 2008, and "Karabakhe mern e" in May 2015.

== Discography ==
=== Albums ===
Title	Album details
Erkar Em Spasel	Released: 18 January 2009; Label: AM Production; Format: CD, Digital download

Title	Album details
The Best Of	Released: 28 October 2009; Label: AM Production; Format: CD, Digital download

Title	Album details
Arajin Ser	Released: 2010; Label: AM Production; Format: CD, Digital download

Title	Album details
Live Concert in Yerevan	Released: 23 August 2010; Label: AM Production; Format: Digital download

Title	Album details
Vay Vay	Released: 21 December 2011; Label: Armin Movsisyan Production; Format: Digital download

List of collaborative albums
Title	Album details
Qez Hamar (Live)	Released: 6 January 2012; Label: AM Production; Format: Digital download

=== Singles ===
==== As lead artist ====
List of singles
Title	Year	Album
"Im Javakhk"	2012	Non-album singles
"Sirel 'em, Sirum 'em U Ksirem"	2012	Non-album singles
"Qam-Qam"	2013	Non-album singles
"Im Sirats Yarin Tarel En"	2013	Non-album singles
"Yaro Jan"	2013	Non-album singles
"Berem, Berem" (feat. Sargis Yeghiazaryan)	2014	Non-album singles
"Ashugh Razo"	2014	Non-album singles
"Spasvats Ser"	2015	Non-album singles
"Glor-Glor"	2016	Non-album singles
"43-E Kapi Mej E"	2016	Non-album singles
"Sirem Qez, Lianam"	2016	Non-album singles
"Ser Im"	2017	Non-album singles
"Chuni Ashkharhe Qez Nman"	2017	Non-album singles
"Sherami Pes"	2017	Non-album singles
"Ansahman Ser"	2017	Non-album singles
"Im Ashxarhn Es..."	2017	Non-album singles
"I Love You" (feat. Martin Mkrtchyan)	2018	Non-album singles
"Im Sirun Hreshtak"	2018	Non-album singles
"Amenic annman"	2018	Non-album singles
"Pashtelis"	2018	Non-album singles
"Balik"	2018	Non-album singles
"Daughter" (Russian: Доченька) (feat. Mart Babayan)	2018	Non-album singles
"Na"	2019	Non-album singles
"Heriq E"	2019	Non-album singles
"Im Amenasirun"	2019	Non-album singles
"Son" (Russian: Сынок)	2019	Non-album singles
"Du"	2020	Non-album singles
"Im Amenasirun" (Emmanuel & DJ Smoke Remix)	2020	Non-album singles
"Sirts"	2020	Non-album singles
"Ov sirun, sirun"	2020	Non-album singles
"Matagh Qez"	2020	Non-album singles
"Amenabari Srtov Aghjik"	2021	Non-album singles
"Qonn e Sirts"	2021	Non-album singles
"Hayrik"	2021	Non-album singles
"Gna"	2021	Non-album singles
"Sirtd Srtis Mej"	2021	Non-album singles
"Shat Urish"	2021	Non-album singles
"Annman"	2021	Non-album singles
"Tsaghikner"	2022	Non-album singles
"Im Siro Hasak"	2023	Non-album singles
"Im Aghjik"	2023	Non-album singles
"Karabakh"	2023	Non-album singles
"Cavd Tanem Mam Jan"	2023	Non-album singles
"Et Ari"	2023	Non-album singles
"Sirelov" (feat. Tatev Asatryan)	2023	Non-album singles
"Arevic Lusin"	2023	Non-album singles
"Imn es"	2023	Non-album singles
"Hayastan im chqnagh"	2023	Non-album singles
"Bari Tari"	2023	Non-album singles
"Bardinere xshshacin"	2024	Non-album singles
"Sere Lav Giti"	2024	Non-album singles
"Draxti Peri"	2024	Non-album singles
"Im Bala"	2024	Non-album singles
"Na Imn A"	2024	Non-album singles
"I Know" (Russian: Знаю)	2024	Non-album singles
"Gites" (feat. Sona)	2024	Non-album singles
"Sers Tarar" (feat. Srbuhi Amyan)	2025	Non-album singles
"El Avel"	2025	Non-album singles
"Aghjiks"	2025	Non-album singles
"Dzerqe Qo Brnats"	2025	Non-album singles
"Mam, Es Kam"	2025	Non-album singles
"Filmi Aghjik"	2025	Non-album singles

== Filmography ==
As himself
Year	Title	Role	Notes
2007	Two Stars (Երկու աստղ)	Singer	with Louisa Nersisyan
2015	Full House	Himself	Guest
2016	Benefis (Բենեֆիս)	Himself	Episode: "Razmik Amyan"

== Awards and nominations ==
Year	Award	Category	City	Result	Ref.
2007	Golden Lyre Awards	Song of the Year	Yerevan	Won	
2008	TOP-10 Awards	The Music Video of the Month		Won	
2008	7 Songs Awards	Song of the Year	Yerevan	Won	
2009	Awards of Armenian Musical Channel	Singer of the Year	Yerevan	Won	
2009	Tashir Awards	Singer of the Year	Moscow	Won	
2009	Acord Awards	Song of the Year		Won	
2009	National Music Awards	Singer of the Year	Yerevan	Won	
2009	Awards of BOOM magazine	Singer of the Year		Won	
2010	Armenian Golden Star Awards	Singer of the Year	Los Angeles	Won	
