= Red Hill (TV series) =

- Կարմիր բլուր
- Written by: Anahit Mkhitaryan
- Directed by: Gurgen Sargsyan
- Country of origin: Armenia
- Original language: Armenian
- No. of seasons: 1

Production
- Producer: Yelena Arshakyan
- Production locations: Yerevan, Surenavan
- Running time: 34-43 minutes

Original release
- Network: ATV, PanArmenian TV
- Release: January 8, 2018

Red Hill (Armenian: Կարմիր բլուր, Karmir Blur) is an Armenian drama television series, which premiered on ATV on January 8, 2018, and airs every Mondays to Fridays at 11:00 (PM).

Most of the series took place in the village of Surenavan.

== Cast and characters ==
=== Main cast ===
- Anet Harutyunyan
- Tiruhi Hakobyan
- Luiza Melkonyan
- Susanna Baghdasaryan
- Vardan Hovsepyan
- Samvel Sargsyan
- Artashes Aleksanyan
- Sargis Grigoryan
- Ruzan Mesropyan
- Vahe Ziroyan
- Julieta Sagatelian
