= Abel's Sister =

- Աբելի քույրը
- Genre: drama
- Country of origin: Armenia
- Original language: Armenian
- No. of seasons: 1
- No. of episodes: 181

Production
- Production locations: Yerevan, Armenia
- Running time: 35-40 minutes

Original release
- Network: ATV (Armenia)
- Release: March 7, 2016 – 2016

Related
- The Last Father

Abel's Sister is an ATV series.

== Cast and characters ==
- Davit Grigoryan portrays Abel Grigoryan
- Narine Dovlatyan portrays Lilith Grigoryan
- Hakob Hakobyan portrays Sevak
- Hayk Sargsyan portrays Hakob
- Hovak Galoyan portrays Kamo
- Aramo portrays Aramo
- Hovak Galoyan portrays Avag Grigoryan
- Yulia Fink portrays Alina Grigoryan
- Karo Hovhannisyan portrays Aram Grigoryan
- Araqsya Meliqyan portrays Ester
- Meri Hakobyan portrays Lika Grigoryan
- Elen Asatryan portrays Nonna
- Mika Ghaplanyan portrays Arman
- Artur Manucharyan portrays David
- Kristine Karapetyan portrays Astghik
- Artur Harutyunyan portrays inspector
- Lilit Abelyan portrays Sara
- Yura Igitkhanyan portrays Abraham Semionich
- Lili Vardanyan portrays Mrs Manoukyan
- Emma Zournachyan portrays Mariam
- Yelena Borisenko portrays Silva
- Davit Mardyan portrays Noi
