= Masha Mnjoyan =

Armenian singer (born 1995)

Masha Mnjoyan Մաշա Մնջոյան
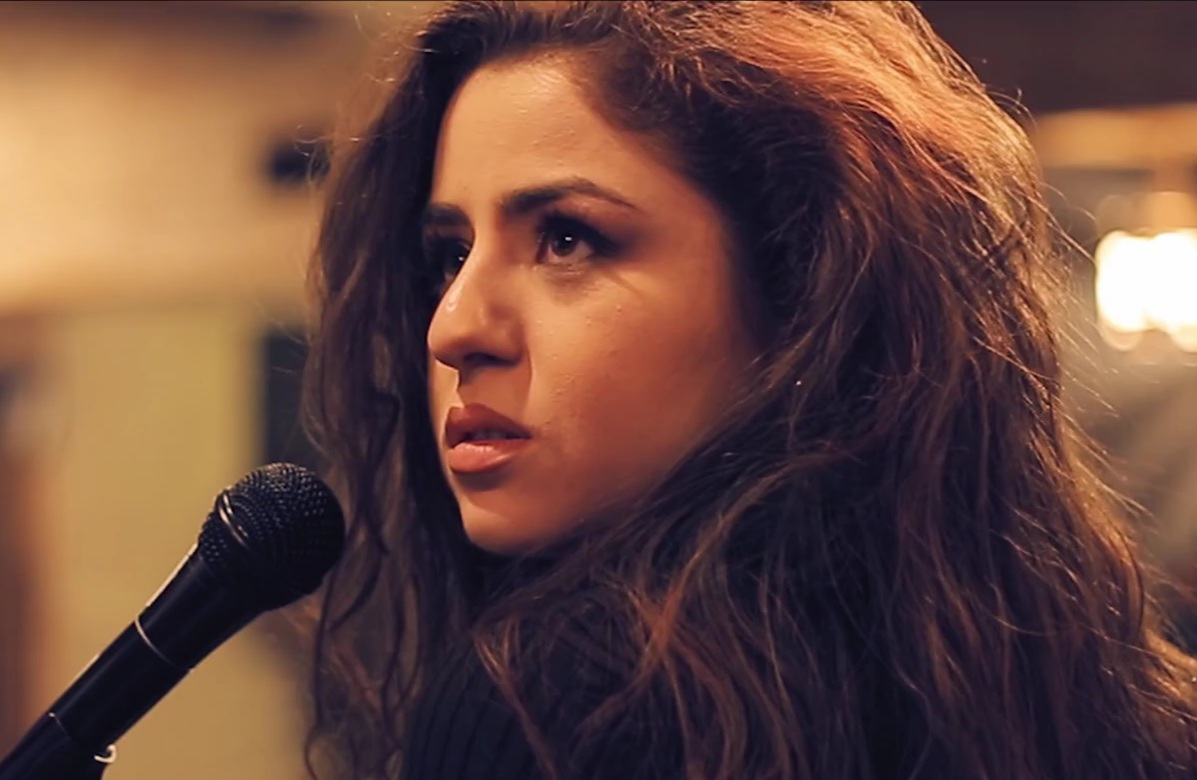
- Mnjoyan in the music video for "Es qonn em" in 2016

Background information
- Born: Meri Mnjoyan; February 7, 1995 (age 31); Gyumri, Armenia
- Occupation: Singer
- Years active: 2007–present

Meri "Masha" Mnjoyan (Armenian: Մերի "Մաշա" Մնջոյան, born February 7, 1995), is an Armenian singer, the winner of The Voice of Armenia television singing competition in 2013.

== Life and career ==
Meri Mnjoyan was born at February 7, 1995 in Gyumri, Armenia.

Starting from 1999 she was involved with Deghcanik junior ensemble, and in 2000 had the first solo concert.

From 2001 to 2009 she have studied at the No. 7 basic school of Gyumri and at Gyumri Art School named after N. Tigranyan faculty of vocals and piano from 2002.

From 2009 to 2013 studied at the Yerevan State Culture college. In 2013 she has been enrolled at the Komitas State Conservatory of Yerevan, faculty of jazz-vocals which she graduated from in 2017.

From 2009 to 2019 she was performing at the "Our Lady of Armenia Boghossian Educational Centre's" choir, and with the choir she performed at Vatican City in 2015 as part of a holy communion commemorating the centenary after Armenian genocide.

== 2013: The Voice of Armenia ==
In 2013, Mnjoyan auditioned for the inaugural season of The Voice of Armenia. In the blind auditions, all judges turned their chair for her and she picked Sona as her coach. She reached the final and was declared the winner of the season on March 4, 2013.

The Voice performances and results (2013)
Episode	Song	Original Artist	Result
Audition	"Hallelujah"	Leonard Cohen	Through to Battle Rounds
Battle Rounds	"Stand Up for Love"	Destiny's Child	Through to the Live shows
Live show 2	"I Am Changing"	Jennifer Holliday	Through to live show 4
Live show 4	"Impossible"	Christina Aguilera	Through to live show 6
Live show 6	"Կանգ առ"	Marianna Hovhannisyan	Through to the Quarter-final
Quarter Final	"If I Could"	Regina Belle	Through to the Semi-final
Semi Final	"Hurt"	Christina Aguilera	Through to the Final
Final	"Note to God"	JoJo	Winner
Final	"A Song for You" (with Artyom Kacharyan)	Leon Russell	Winner
Final	"The land beyond /Disperation" (with Sona)	Sona	Winner

== 2020: The Voice of Australia ==
In 2020, Mnjoyan auditioned for the ninth season of The Voice of Australia as an "All-star" contestant. In the blind auditions, all judges turned their chair for her and she picked Kelly Rowland as her coach. She was later "stolen" by Boy George and was eliminated in the Semi-final, finishing in the top 8 of the competition.

The Voice performances and results (2020)
Episode	Song	Original Artist	Result
Audition	"All by Myself"	Céline Dion	Through to Battle Rounds
Battle Rounds	"Respect"	Aretha Franklin	Lost. Saved by Boy George. Through to The play-offs
The play-offs	"I Have Nothing"	Whitney Houston	Through to Showdowns
Showdowns	"Chains"	Tina Arena	Saved by Coach
Semi Final	"Rain on Me"	Lady Gaga & Ariana Grande	Eliminated

=== Other singing contests ===
- 2007 – an award at "Pearl Berlona" contest in Berlin, Germany.
- 2008 – third place at Armenia's national final for the Junior Eurovision Song Contest 2008. That same year, she also wrote the lyrics of and provided backing vocals for Armenia's entry at Junior Eurovision Song Contest 2008 in Cyprus.
- 2008 – "Grand Prize" at the "Violet Nana" international competition in Batumi, Georgia.
- 2010 – third place at the "I love Tbilisi" international contest in Tbilisi, Georgia.
- 2011 – first place at the "Alania 2010" international contest in Turkey.
- 2012 – semi-finalist of the "New Wave" international contest in Moscow, Russia.
- 2013 – victory in the mega-competition "The Voice of Armenia".
- 2013 – seventh place at the "New Wave" international contest in Yurmala, Latvia.
- 2016 – backing vocalist at the Eurovision in Stockholm, Sweden.

Awards and achievements
Preceded by N/A	The Voice of Armenia Winner; 2012-13	Succeeded by Anna Khanchalyan
