= Lusin (song) =

2017 single by Garik Papoyan and Sona Rubenyan

"Lusin / Լուսին"

Single by Garik Papoyan and Sona Rubenyan
- Language: Armenian
- English title: Moon
- Released: November 13, 2017
- Genre: pop
- Length: 3:59
- Label: Garik Papoyan
- Songwriter(s): Edgar Elbakyan Jr.
- Producer(s): Garik Papoyan

Garik Papoyan singles chronology
"Boat (feat. Srbuk)" (2014)	"Lusin / Լուսին" (2017)	"Bingyol (feat. Sona Rubenyan)" (2018)

Sona Rubenyan singles chronology
"Wait" (2016)	"Lusin" (2017)	"Bingyol (feat. Garik Papoyan)" (2018)

Music video
- "Lusin" on YouTube

"Lusin" (English: "Moon") is a song by Armenian musicians Garik Papoyan and Sona Rubenyan. The song was released for digital download on iTunes as a single on 13 November 2017. However, the song's live performance was uploaded on YouTube on October 27. The song is written by another Armenian musician Edgar Elbakyan. The song was named the hit of the year at the 2018 Swallow Music Awards. The song was also named the best track of December month at the Van Music Awards.

== Credits and personnel ==
Credits adapted from YouTube.

- Garik Papoyan – production, arrangements
- Sona Rubenyan – vocals
- David Gevorgyan – drums
- David Paronikyan - percussion

== Awards ==
Year	Award	Category	City	Result	Ref.
2018	Swallow Music Awards	The Hit of The Year	Yerevan	Won	

== See also ==
- LoveWave
