= Hrach Muradyan =

Armenian television host, producer

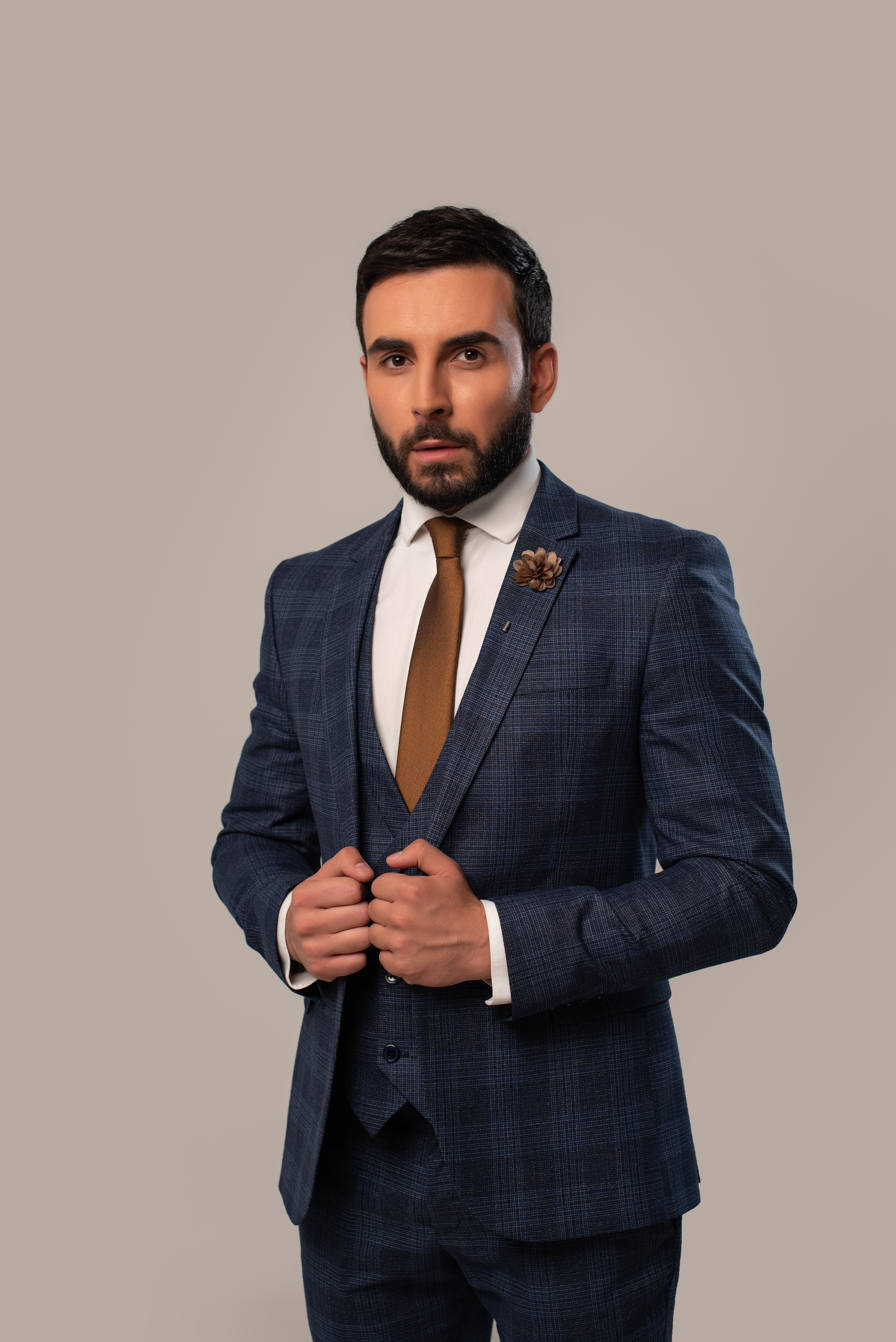
- Born: November 10, 1983 (age 42); Yerevan, Armenia, Soviet Union
- Occupations: Television host, Producer, Actor
- Years active: 2000–present
- Known for: Armenian television host
- Notable work: Half-Opened Windows, Open Project, The Voice of Armenia – season 1
- Television: PanArmenian TV
- Website: https://hrachmuradyan.com/

Hrach Vachiki Muradyan (Armenian: Հրաչ Վաչիկի Մուրադյան; born November 10, 1983) is an Armenian television host, producer, and public figure. Hrach Muradyan is known for hosting the singing competition The Voice of Armenia, the first Armenian talk show "Open Project", and the highest-rated Armenian TV show Half-Opened Windows.

== Biography ==
Hrach Muradyan was born in Yerevan, Armenia.

He started his first steps as a TV host while still attending high school at the age of 14. After graduating high school, in 2000–2004 he started his higher education at the Yerevan State Institute of Theatre & Cinematography, and majored in acting/directing. While attending the institute he already had his own entertainment show "Music box" on NMTV, as well as his radio show on HYE FM. He was also the host in different television and radio shows – "16" (Armenakob TV), "By the Way" (AR TV), "Night of the Century" (DAR 21 TV), "Dynamite FM" (Yerevan Radio), and "Aurora" (National Radio). Then he started producing and/or co-producing a variety of shows hosted by other television personalities, such as "Sex in the Small City", "Sixth sense", "Hungry Games", "Abel's sister" and "Bureau No.6".

=== Half-Opened Windows ===
In 2009, Hrach Muradyan started producing and hosting a talk show titled Half-Opened Windows. Half-Opened Windows has been recognized as the highest-rated show in the Armenian network.
