= Metsavan =

Metsavan Մեծավան
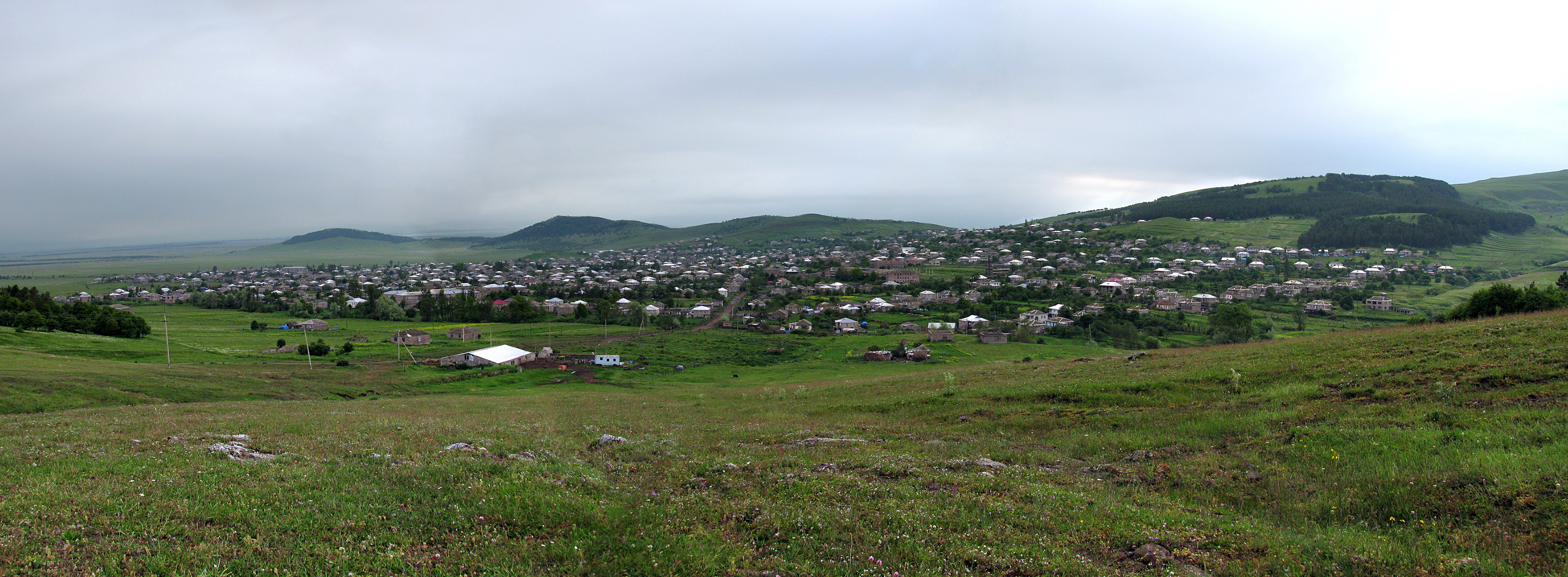

- Location within Armenia
- Coordinates: 41°12′06″N 44°13′44″E
- Country: Armenia
- Province: Lori
- Elevation: 1,575 m (5,167 ft)

Population (2011)
  - Total: 4,578
- Time zone: UTC+4 (AMT)

Metsavan (Armenian: Մեծավան) is a village in the Lori Province of Armenia, near the Armenia–Georgia border.

== Notable people ==
- Sevak Khanagyan, winner of X-Factor Ukraine and represented Armenia at the Eurovision Song Contest.

== Gallery ==
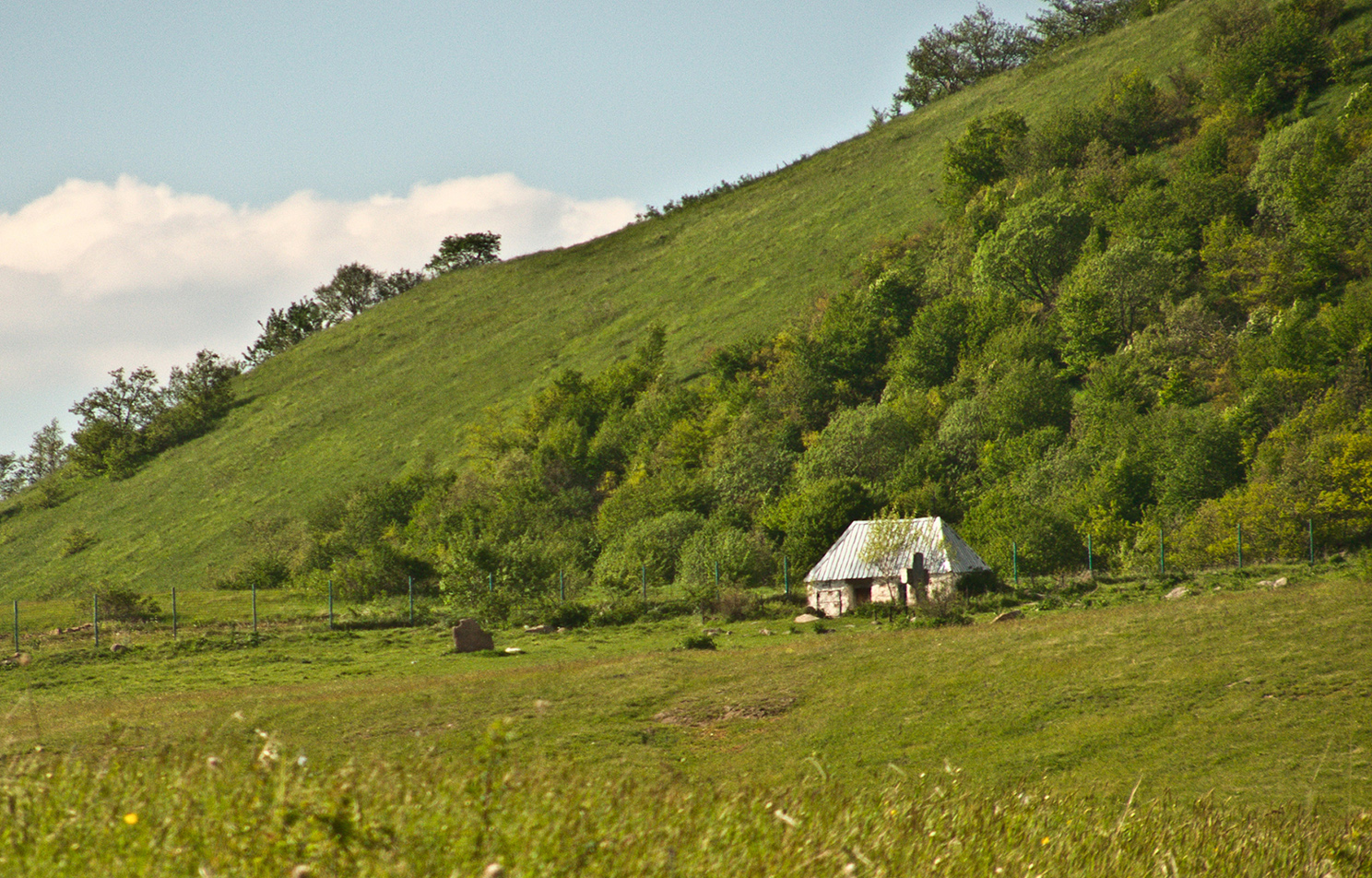

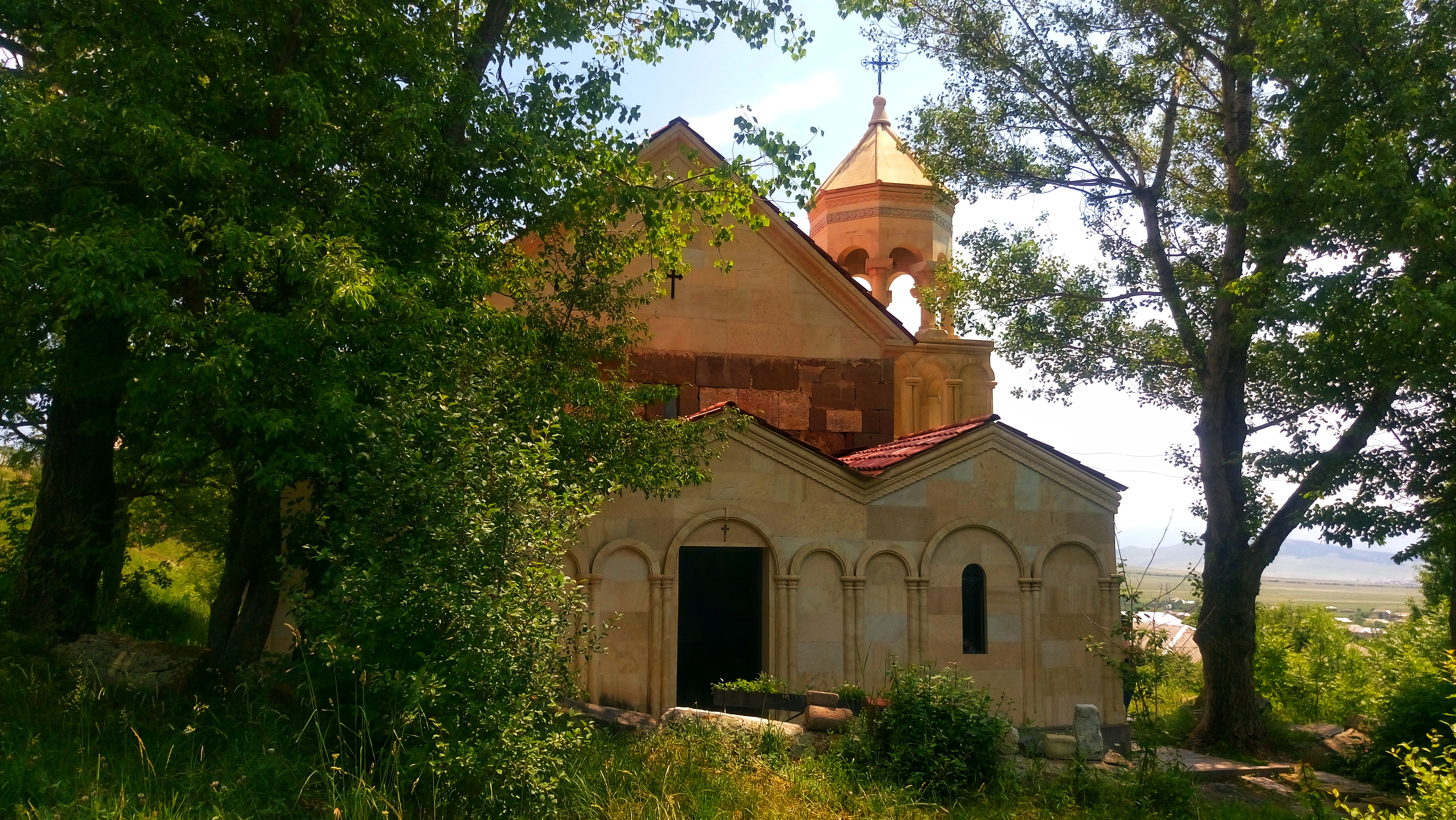

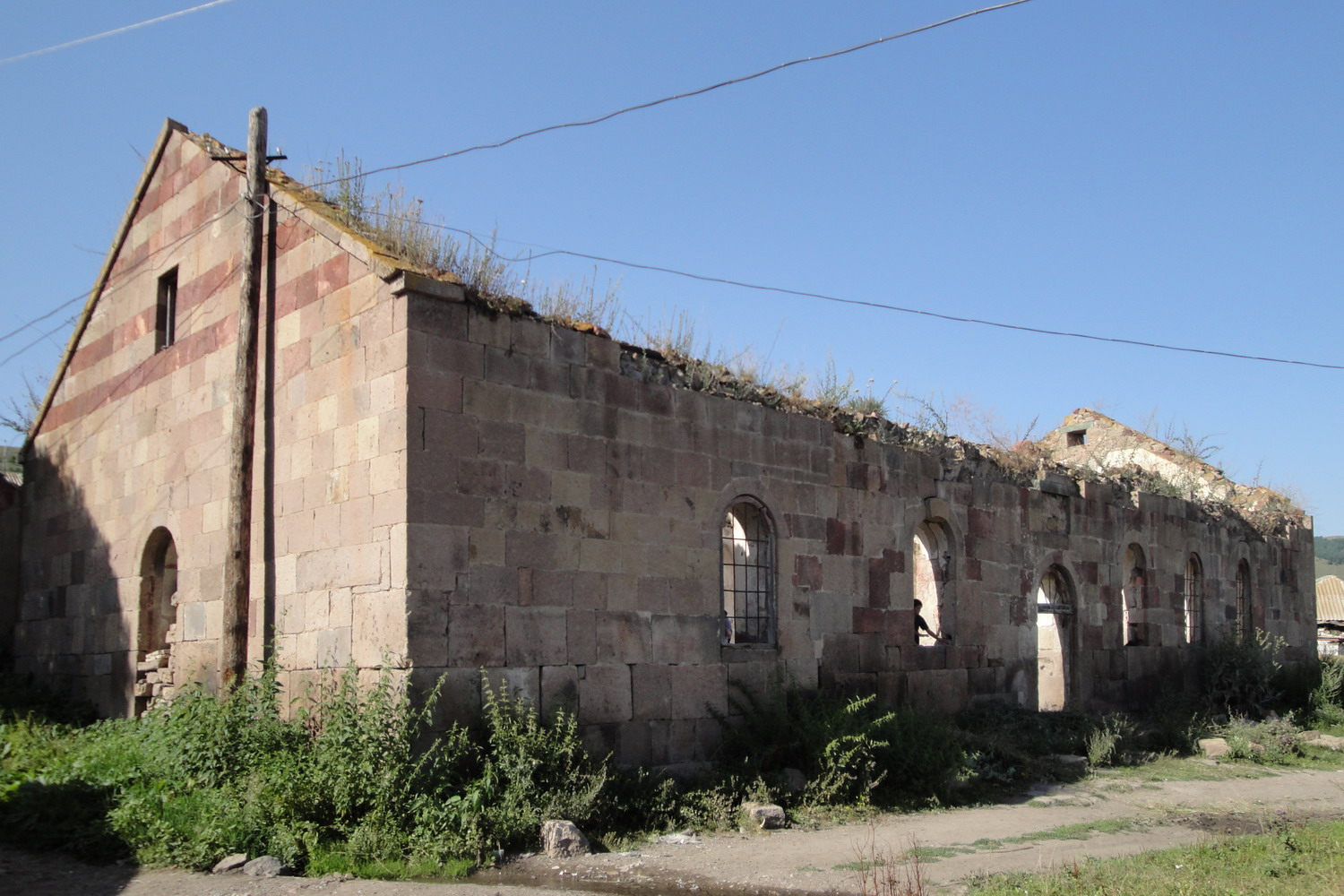
