= Zaruhi Babayan =

Armenian singer

- Born: Zaruhi Babayan; 27 December 1975 (age 49); Yerevan, Armenian SSR, Soviet Union
- Origin: Armenia
- Genres: Pop
- Occupation: Singer
- Instrument: Vocals
- Years active: 1993–present
- Website: zaruhibabayan.com

Zaruhi Haykarami Babayan (Armenian: Զարուհի Հայկարամի Բարսեղյան, born 27 December 1975) is an Armenian singer. In 2014, Babayan was awarded with the title of Honored Artist of Armenia upon the decree of Armenian president Serzh Sargsyan. She was a member of Armenia jury in Junior Eurovision Song Contest 2014 and 2017.

== Discography ==
- Janaparh Depi (2001)
- Old & New (2006)
- Sirelis (2016)

== Awards ==
- Best Popular Retro Album, Armenian Music Awards (2002)
- Best Female Vocalist, Armenian Music Awards (2002)
