= Dle Yaman =

Armenian traditional tune

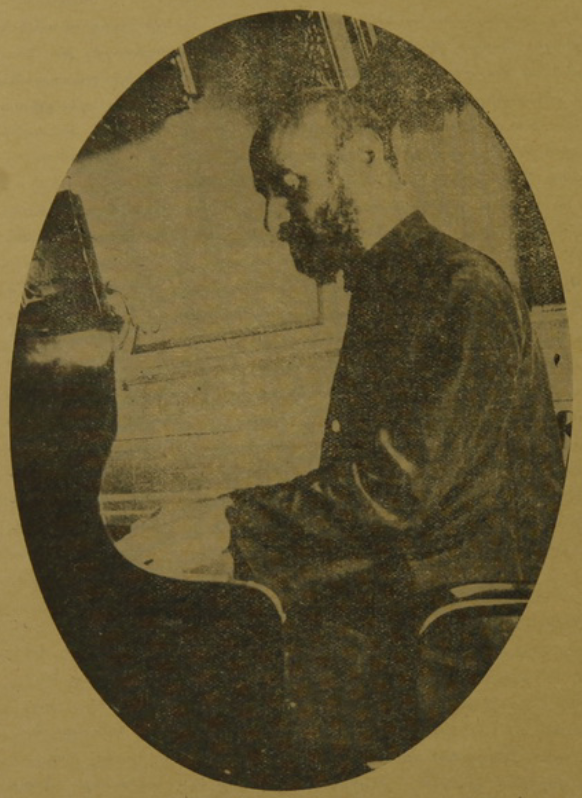
Komitas playing the piano

"Dle Yaman" (in Armenian Դլե Յաման, in Western Armenian Տըլէ Եաման) also francicized "Délé Yaman" is an Armenian traditional tune. It is the story of a tragic love affair between two persons. It was discovered by Father Komitas in his travels in Armenian countryside. He re-arranged the lyrics and the music for the piano. "Dle Yaman" is very often interpreted with solo bits made with the duduk.

The song became an iconic Armenian song with hundreds of interpretations and covers, one of the most famous being by Armenian soprano Lusine Zakaryan. Notable versions of the song include the Armenian artists Levon Minassian, Djivan Gasparyan on duduk, Flora Martirosian, Nune Yesayan (with Jivan Gasparyan) etc. Song has been interpreted by international artists like Canadian Isabel Bayrakdarian, the French artists Hélène Segara and Patrick Fiori, Russian artist Zara etc.

In time, the song, popularly became one of the hymns of the Armenian genocide, which is commemorated every year on 24 April.

French-Armenian film director Henri Verneuil used the song as the main soundtrack for his 1991 semi-autobiographical film Mayrig.
