= Away from Home (TV series) =

Away from Home (Armenian: Տնից Հեռու, Tnic Heru) is an Armenian entertainment television program. The series premiered on ATV Armenia on 10 November 2015. It is a travel show about costumes, history, geography, national traditions and lifestyles of different nations featuring both the richest and poorest areas in the world. It is hosted by Vardan Sargsyan.

== Countries and regions that the program has visited ==
=== Season 1 ===
- India (13 episodes)
- Egypt (6 episodes)
- General – 19 episodes

=== Season 2 ===
- Vietnam (10 episodes)
- Maldives (5 episodes)
- Adjara (4 episodes)
- Malaysia (unknown episodes)
- Sri Lanka (unknown episodes)
- Thailand (unknown episodes)
