= Christine Pepelyan =

Armenian broadcaster and singer

- Born: Christine Pepelyan; April 22, 1980 (age 46); Yerevan, Armenian SSR, Soviet Union
- Education: Komitas State Conservatory of Yerevan
- Occupations: singer, broadcaster
- Years active: 1998–present
- Height: 173 cm (5 ft 8 in)

Christine Rubeni Pepelyan (Armenian: Քրիստինե Ռուբենի Պեպելյան, born April 22, 1980), is an Armenian broadcaster and singer. In 2013, she was one of the jury members of The Voice of Armenia, in addition, the winner of The Voice was from her team. In 2017, Pepelyan appeared as a special guest in a musical program called "Benefis", which is about the most prominent Armenian singers and songwriters. Later, she participated a new project for helping all the children who suffer from cancer. Many Armenian famous singers were also participating, such as Mkrtich Arzumanyan, Iveta Mukuchyan, Mihran Tsarukyan, Erik, and Aram MP3.

== Discography ==
- Vor Hishes (2004)
- About Me (2005)
- Live in Concert (2007)
- The Best (2009)
- New Hits (2010)
- The Best Of (2011)
- Shnorhakal Em (2013)
- Live Concert in Yerevan (2014)

== Filmography ==
As herself
Year	Title	Notes
2013–2014	The Voice of Armenia (Հայաստանի Ձայնը)	Judge/Mentor
2017	Benefis (Բենեֆիս)	Special guest
2017	I exist (Ես կամ)	Special guest
