= If I Find You =

- Եթե գտնեմ քեզ
- Genre: Drama; Melodrama
- Directed by: Gurgen Sargsyan
- Starring: Anita Mkrtchyan; Rozi Avetisova; Gevorg Grigoryan; Samvel Sargsyan; Naira Shahiryan
- Country of origin: Armenia
- Original language: Armenian
- No. of seasons: 1
- No. of episodes: 234

Production
- Producer: Elena Arshakyan
- Production locations: Yerevan, Armenia
- Running time: 32-40 minutes

Original release
- Network: ATV, Panarmenian TV
- Release: January 8 – December 31, 2017

If I Find You (Armenian: Եթե գտնեմ քեզ, Yete Gtnem Kez) is an Armenian drama television series. The series premiered on ATV on January 8, 2017. Since then, the series air every workday at 21:00.

The series mostly takes place in Yerevan, Armenia.
