= Surenavan =

Surenavan Սուրենավան
- Location within Armenia Location within Ararat
- Coordinates: 39°45′N 44°48′E
- Country: Armenia
- Province: Ararat
- Municipality: Ararat

Population (2011)
  - Total: 2,172
- Time zone: UTC+4
  - Summer (DST): UTC+5

Surenavan (Armenian: Սուրենավան) is a village in the Ararat Municipality of the Ararat Province of Armenia. The village was renamed in 1946 in honor of Suren Spandaryan, a revolutionary. In tourist routes this village is indicated as a “village of storks” due to the birds nesting here.
