= Half-Opened Windows =

- Կիսաբաց Լուսամուտներ; Kisabac Lusamutner
- Genre: Talk show
- Developed by: Hrach Muradyan
- Written by: Hrach Muradyan
- Directed by: Arthur Agoyan
- Presented by: Hrach Muradyan
- Country of origin: Armenia
- Original language: Armenian
- No. of episodes: 1500+

Production
- Executive producer: Hrach Muradyan
- Producer: Hrach Muradyan
- Running time: 40-50 minutes
- Production company: Kisabac Lusamutner

Original release
- Network: ATV
- Release: 13 December 2010 – 18 July 2024

Half-Opened Windows (Armenian: Կիսաբաց Լուսամուտներ, romanized: Kisabac' Lusamutner) is an Armenian talk show hosted by presenter-producer Hrach Muradyan. Since 13 December 2010, it has been the longest running Armenian talk show. In 2011, it was named the best talk show of the year. It aims to address difficult social issues. The last episode was released on July 18, 2024, and the project closed on August 31, 2024. Hrach made a post on Facebook about this.

== Controversies ==
In 2016, the talk show had a gay guest, who received some hate speech during the show. He was specifically discriminated for being gay by lawyer Garik Galikyan and producer Sargis Mikayelyan. They were both criticized for their hate speech against LGBT people. Nikol Pashinyan, the current Armenian prime minister, during his campaign in 2018, noted that "In New Armenia, there should be no show as Half-Opened Windows."
