= Shushan Petrosyan =

Shushan Petrosyan Շուշան Պետրոսյան
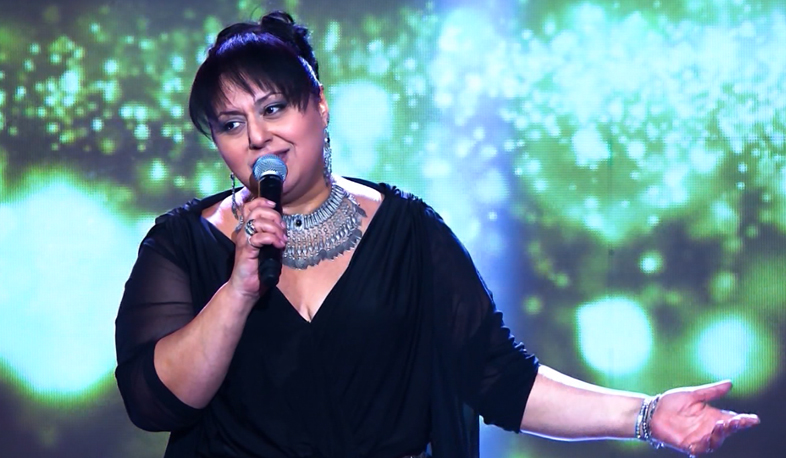

Background information
- Born: September 23, 1967 (age 58); Yerevan, Armenian SSR, Soviet Union
- Origin: Armenian
- Genres: pop, jazz, folk
- Occupations: singer, musician, artist and politician
- Website: shushanpetrosyan.com

Shushan Samveli Petrosyan (Armenian: Շուշան Սամվելի Պետրոսյան, born 23 September 1967) is an Armenian singer, Honored Artist of Armenia, and a former deputy in the National Assembly of Armenia.

== Biography ==
Shushan Petrosyan was born on 23 September 1967 in Yerevan. In 1987, she graduated from Terlemezyan College of Fine Arts' painting program, and in 1993, she graduated from Yerevan State Academy of Fine Arts' graphics program. From 1989 to 1991, she worked in "Ardzagank" theater-studio (Metro theater) as a costume designer. She composed three performances: "Mythical Eternity", "Antigone", and "The Lord and the Servant". From 1994-1997, she worked at the State Song Theater. In 1996 she became a soloist for the Armenian State Philharmonic. From 2002-2003, she worked as a lecturer at the Yerevan State Institute of Cinema and Theater. In 2005, she became an academician of the International Academy of Nature and Society. In 2006, she was awarded the title of Honored Artist of Armenia.

She is divorced and has two children.

== Music career ==
Petrosyan participated in concerts organized for the representatives of the Armenian Diaspora in Armenia and abroad and has given solo concerts. She dedicated the song "Sparapet" («Սպարապետ») to Vazgen Sargsyan. She has received numerous awards during her musical career, including:

- 1993 Grand Prix (Sharm Show International Festival)
- 1996 "Best Singer of the Year" ("Fireball" Awards)
- 2000 "Armenian star of the 20th century" ("Astgh" festival)
- 2000 "Best Female Performer" ("Anush" Awards, USA)
- 2001 "Best Original Song" ("Armenian Music Awards, USA")
- 2001 "Best Female Vocalist" ("Armenian Music Awards, USA")
- 2004 "The best voice of independent Armenia" ("Crane" festival)
- 2004 "Best Original Contemporary Album - The Stepan Lusikian Award" ("Armenian Music Awards, USA")
- 2004 "Best Female Vocalist - ("Armenian Music Awards, USA")
- 2009 "Diva" award (annual song festival, USA)

== Political career ==
=== Member of Parliament ===
Petrosyan secured her position as a National Assembly deputy in Armenia on May 6, 2012, through the pre-election roster of the Republican Party of Armenia. During her tenure, she actively participated as a member of the National Assembly Standing Committee on Science, Education, Culture, Youth, and Sports. Shushan Petrosyan fulfilled her role as a deputy until 2018.

== Discography ==
- Im Anush Hayreniq (2001)
- Await Us Ararat (2003)
- Mtorumner (2003)
- Hanrapetutyun 15 (2006)
- The Best (2007)

=== DVDs ===
- Hanrapetutyun 15 (2006)
