= The Last Father =

- Վերջին հայրիկը
- Genre: Drama; Melodrama
- Written by: Anahit Mkhitaryan Ani Maghakyan
- Directed by: Artur Davtyan
- Creative director: Areg Davtyan
- Country of origin: Armenia
- Original language: Armenian
- No. of seasons: 1
- No. of episodes: 143

Production
- Producer: Anahit Mkhitaryan
- Production locations: Yerevan, Armenia
- Running time: 32-40 minutes

Original release
- Network: ATV, Panarmenian TV
- Release: 9 November 2015 – 31 May 2016

The Last Father is a Armenian television series shown from 2015 to 2016.

== Cast and characters ==
- Guj Manukyan portrays Davit
- Vardan Hovsepyan portrays Grandfather
- Arman Martirosyan portrays Ruben
- Diana Grigoryan portrays

=== Episodes ===
| No. overall | No. in season | Title | Directed by | Written by | Original release date |
|---|---|---|---|---|---|
| 1 | 1 | TBA | Artur Davtyan | Anahit Mkhitaryan Ani Maghaqyan | November 9, 2015 |
Ruben’s mother commits a suicide and leaves a letter to her son with which he should find his father. It turns out that his father has been in jail since 12 years charged with murder.
| 2 | 2 | TBA | Artur Davtyan | Anahit Mkhitaryan Ani Maghaqyan | November 10, 2015 |
Grandfather visits Ruben. It wasn’t easy for grandpa to convince him and take him to his house. They should live together- relatives that don’t know each other. According to the decision of the board of Parole Ruben’s father David comes back home after 12 years.
| 3 | 3 | TBA | Artur Davtyan | Anahit Mkhitaryan Ani Maghaqyan | November 11, 2015 |
Ruben doesn’t want to recognize his father and to live with him. David wants to prove his son that it wasn’t his fault. Quarrels become inevitable. But it turns out that Ruben is seriously ill and he is told to have one year left. Now the aim of David’s life is to ensure a good life for Ruben during that one year.
