= Arsen Grigoryan (singer, born 1978) =

- Born: 23 June 1978 (age 47); Yerevan, Armenian SSR, Soviet Union
- Genres: Pop
- Occupations: Singer; composer; music producer
- Years active: 1996–present

Arsen Gagiki Grigoryan (Armenian: Արսեն Գագիկի Գրիգորյան; born 23 June 1978) is an Armenian singer and composer.

== Career ==
In 1995, he graduated from school No.131 after P. Yavorov in Yerevan. From 1995 to 2000 he studied in Hovhannes Badalyan's class at the department of Folk Music of Yerevan State Conservatory after Komitas.

In 1996, Arsen Grigoryan started his musical career by participating in singer Susanna Safaryan's concert nights. In 1997 he became the winner of Yerevan Youth Song Contest. From 1999 to 2004 Arsen Grigoryan worked at the Armenian State Song Theatre as a soloist. Arsen embarked on a concert tour in France, the United States, Spain, Belgium, Iran, Russia and other countries.

He has given solo concerts in Yerevan in 2002, 2006, 2008, 2009 and 2014 and in Syria in 2010.

Arsen Grigoryan has released several albums and has shot over 10 music videos. The last music video "Irarov" was published on 13 January 2022.

Arsen Grigoryan is the author of the soundtrack "Sery" (The love) of the comedy movie "Nakhachash erkusi hamar" (Breakfast for two).

In 2017, Arsen Grigoryan had his solo concert "Benefis" on Public Television of Armenia.

Arsen Grigoryan continues to have small concerts in different music halls.

Arsen Grigoryan's Studio Grigoryan is the director of Studio, which opened on 1 September 2018. The studio's students had their first solo concert on 16 December 2019 at Hakob Paronyan State Musical Comedy Theatre. They have participated in many concerts and have got many awards. The students have several music videos, such as "Mayrik" (Մայրիկ), "Sharqayin Harutyunyan" (Շարքային Հարությունյան), "De Ergir" (Դե Երգիր), "Im Poqrik Hayastan" (Իմ փոքրիկ Հայաստան), "Mokats harsner" (Մոկաց հարսներ) and many more.

== Discography ==
=== Albums ===
- "Batsir Achkerd" (Open Your Eyes) (2003)
- "Sern E Khosum" (Love Speaks) (2006)
- "Mna" (Stay) (2008)
- "Yerazum" (In My Dream) (2010)
- "Inch lavn es" (How good are you) (2018)

=== Songs ===
Arsen Grigoryan's Songs

No.	Title	Length
1.	"Irarov"	3.56
2.	"Khostanum em"	3.53
3.	"Sery"	3.35
4.	"Sern e khosum"	4.35
5.	"Miayn es ev du"	3.49
6.	"Te tesnes"	4.49
7.	"Gta"	3.56
8.	"Anvernagir"	4.26
9.	"Ari mots"	4.13
10.	"Vonc asem"	3.57
11.	"Qayl ara"	4.13
12.	"Yerku imast"	4.06
13.	"Apsos"	3.41
14.	"Yerani"	3.54
15.	"Sern e da"	4.19
16.	"Mna"	4.07

School Students' Songs

No.	Title	Length
1.	"Mayrik"	5.02
2.	"Sharqayin Harutyunyan"	3.21
3.	"De ergir"	3.43
4.	"Im Poqrik Hayastan"	3.56
5.	"Mokats harsner"	3.53

== Awards ==
Year	Organization	Award
2002	Krunk	Best Young Composer
2002	HIT FM 106 awards	Best Song "Mnas Barov" (Մնաս բարով)
2002	Golden Knar	Best Song "Mnas Barov
2003	Golden Knar	Best song of the Year "Bacir Achqerd" (Բացիր աչքերդ)
2003	Golden Knar	Best Composer of the Year
2006	Golden Knar	Best Song "Anvernagir" (ԱՆվերնագիր)
2006	Golden Knar	Special Award
2006	MCLUB AMVA Awards in Los Angeles	Best Composer
2007	Armenian Music Awards in Moscow	Best Composer of the Year Best Duet with Nune Yesayan "Miayn yes ev du" (Միայն ես և դու) Best Song "Anvernagir" (Անվերնագիր)
2007	Tashir Music Awards in Moscow	Best Art Duet with poet Avet Barseghyan
2007	Top 10 Music Awards by Sigma TV	Best Song "Apsos" (Ափսոս)
2008	Top 10 Music Awards by Sigma TV	Best Song "Mna" (Մնա)

Song School's Awards

Year	Organization	Award
2018	G Music Awards	Best New Vocal School
2021	G Music Awards	Best Vocal Studio
