= ATV (Armenia) =

ATV ԱԹԻՎԻ
- Type: Television and online
- Country: Armenia
- Headquarters: Yerevan
- Broadcast area: Nationwide
- Launch date: April 25, 2009; 16 years ago
- Official website: www.atv.am
- Replaced: Armenakob

ATV Armenia (stylized as Atv) is a private television network in Armenia. The channel originally launched on April 25, 2009, replacing Armenakob TV's now-defunct frequencies.

== Thematic channels ==
On May 1, 2016, ATV introduced new thematic cable TV channels for different TV audiences.

Image	Name	Description
	Hay TV	Armenian music channel.
	Bazmots TV	TV programs, series, sketches, performances and other shows.
	Kinoman	International movies channel.
	Xaxaliq TV	Kids channel.
	Filmzone	Animated cartoons and comedy channel.
	Tava TV	Hunting, fishing, and cooking channel.
	Muzzone	World hits and most loved music performances.
	Fitness TV	Fitness and health channel.

== Programming ==
Shows that have been broadcast on ATV include:

- Sixth Sense (Armenian: Վեցերորդ Զգայարան, romanized: Vec'erord Zgayaran)
- Hungry Games (Armenian: Սոված Խաղեր, romanized: Sovaç Xaġer)
- More Than Life (Armenian: Կյանքից Առավել, romanized: Kyanqic’ Aravel)
- Most of All (Armenian: Ամենից Ամենա, romanized: Amenic' Amena)
- Half-Opened Windows (Armenian: Կիսաբաց Լուսամուտներ, romanized: Kisabac' Lowsamowtner)
- White Corner (Armenian: Սպիտակ Անկյուն, romanized: Spitak Ankyown)
- Who Are They? (Armenian: Արդյոք Ովքե՞ր Են, romanized: Ardyok' Owk'er En)
- Barter (Բարտեր)
- Softer Than A Stone (Armenian: Քարից Փափուկ, romanized: K'aric' P'apowk)
- Taste of Life (Armenian: Կյանքի համը, romanized: Kyank'i Hamy)
- Away from Home (Armenian: Տնից հեռու, romanized: Tnic’ Heru)
- Red Hill (Armenian: Կարմիր բլուր, romanized: Karmir Blur)
- Stone Cage (Armenian: Քարե Դարդ, romanized: K’are Dard)
- The Last Father (Armenian: Վերջին հայրիկը, romanized: Verjin Hayriky)
- Abel's Sister (Armenian: Աբելի քույրը, romanized: Abeli K’uyry)
- If I Find You (Armenian: Եթե գտնեմ քեզ, romanized: Yete Gtnem Kez)
- Station (Armenian: Կայարան, romanized: Kaiaran)

== See also ==
- Television in Armenia
