= Silva Hakobyan =

Armenian singer (born 1988)

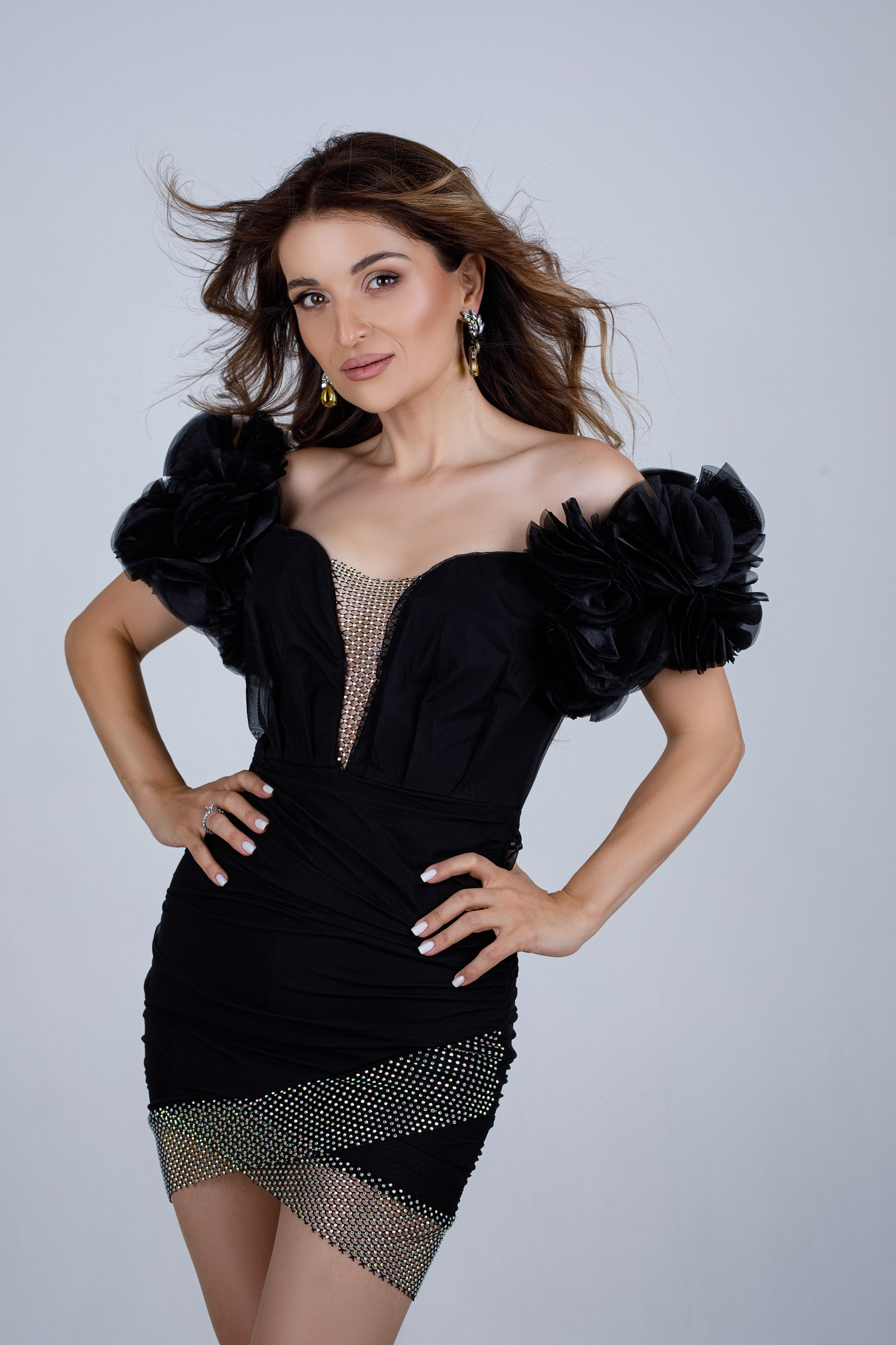

Background information
- Born: October 23, 1988 (age 37); Vayk, Armenian SSR, Soviet Union
- Genres: Pop
- Instrument: Vocals
- Years active: 2006-present

Silva Hakobi Hakobyan (Armenian: Սիլվա Հակոբի Հակոբյան; born October 23, 1988) is an Armenian singer. She rose to fame after winning the competition for the "Next Big Thing" presented by BBC.

== Early life ==
Hakobyan was born on October 23, 1988, in the city of Vayk, Vayots Dzor. She performed since the age of four.

== Career ==
Silva's song "I Like" was composed by her sister Mane and produced by her brother Edgar, the song participated in London in the BBC "The Next Big Thing" global competition and among around 2000 participants, by the decision of world known members of jury was awarded the grand prize. According to the BBC rating, Silva was named the best young singer in the world.

== Discography ==
=== Studio albums ===
- Tnic Pakhel Em (2008)
- Siloi (2010)
- Dochka (2019)

=== DVDs ===
- Live in Concert in Yerevan (2011)
- Live in Concert in Vayk (2014)

=== Live albums ===
- Live in Concert in Yerevan (2011)
- Live in Concert in Vayk (2014)

=== Compilation albums ===
- Gold Collection (2016)
