= Sevak Khanagyan =

Russian-Armenian singer and songwriter (born 1987)

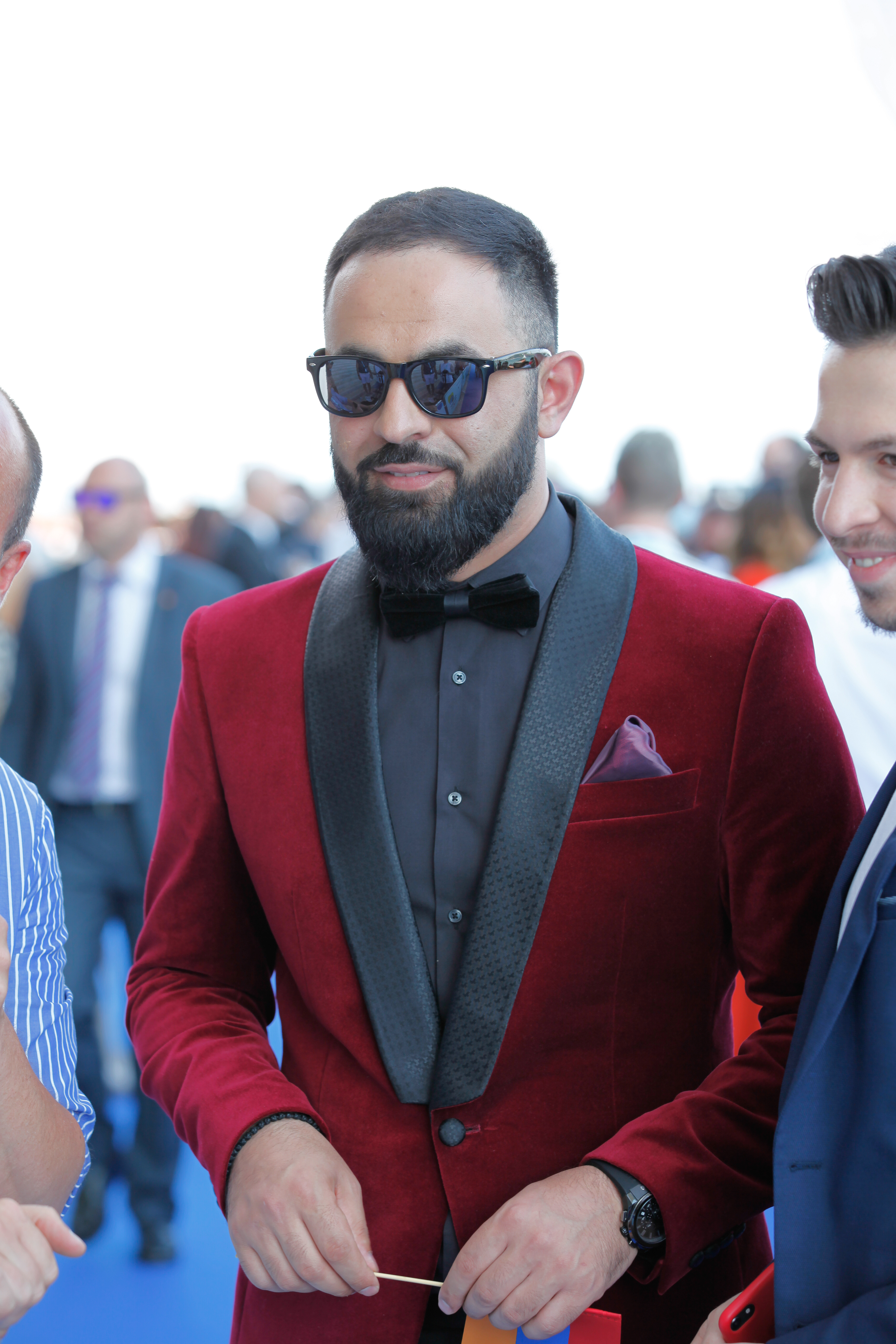
- Khanagyan in 2018

Background information
- Also known as: Seva Khanagyan, Sevak
- Born: 28 July 1987 (age 39); Metsavan, Armenian SSR, USSR
- Origin: Moscow, Russia
- Genres: Pop
- Occupations: Singer; songwriter
- Instrument: Vocals
- Years active: 2015–present

Sevak Tigrani Khanagyan (Armenian: Սևակ Տիգրանի Խանաղյան, Russian: Севак Тигранович Ханагян, romanized: Sevak Tigranovich Khanagyan; born 28 July 1987) is a Russian-Armenian singer and songwriter. Khanagyan came to prominence while competing in season four of The Voice of Russia in 2015, and he later won season seven of X-Factor Ukraine the following year. He has been a coach on The Voice of Armenia since its fourth season in 2017. Khanagyan represented Armenia in the Eurovision Song Contest 2018 with the song "Qami" (Wind).

== Early life ==
Khanagyan was born on 28 July 1987 in Metsavan, a village in the Lori Province. When he was in seventh grade, his family left Armenia and moved to Kursk in Russia. He went on to study music in Moscow, and graduated with a degree in 2014.

== Career ==
=== 2015–2017: Beginnings and X-Factor Ukraine ===
In 2015, Khanagyan competed in the first season of Glavnaya Stsena, the Russian version of The X Factor. He was mentored by Maxim Fadeev, but was eliminated in the quarter-finals. Later that year he began participating in season four of The Voice of Russia. He joined the team of Polina Gagarina but was eliminated in the knockout rounds. The following year, Khanagyan left Russia to compete in season seven of X-Factor Ukraine. Throughout the show, he was mentored by Anton Savlepov and went on to win the competition. Following his success on X-Factor Ukraine, Khanagyan returned to his home country Armenia and became a coach on the third season of The Voice of Armenia.

=== 2018–present: Eurovision Song Contest ===
In December 2017, he was confirmed as a competitor in Depi Evratesil 2018 with the song "Qami". In March, 2018 Public TV of Armenia released the official Music Video of Sevak's "Qami". Director of the music video is Arthur Manukyan. Sevak qualified from the second semi-final on 21 February 2018, and went on to win the competition on 25 February. He went on to represent Armenia in the Eurovision Song Contest 2018, but failed to qualify from the first semi-final coming in 15th place with 79 points.

== Discography ==
=== Albums ===
Title
Океан внутри тебя
Details
- Released: March 15, 2019 (Russia)
Notes

No.	Title	Length
1.	"Ответь"	3:42
2.	"Не беги"	3:51
3.	"Невесомость"	3:39
4.	"Дым"	3:15
5.	"Обними"	3:51
6.	"Ярко"	3:33
7.	"Падать"	3:32
8.	"Открой глаза"	3:03
9.	"Они не знают"	3:17
10.	"Океан внутри тебя"	3:18
11.	"Доброе утро"	3:30

=== Singles ===
Title	Year	Album
"Когда мы с тобой" (feat. VARDA)	2016	Non-album singles
"Hayrenik"	2016	Non-album singles
"Hin Fayton"	2016	Non-album singles
"Не молчи"	2017	Non-album singles
"Im Ttvatsin"	2017	Non-album singles
"Новогодняя"	2017	Non-album singles
"Если вдруг"	2017	Non-album singles
"Qami"	2018	Non-album singles
"Зеркала"	2018	Non-album singles
"Я чувствую кожей" (feat. Lyudmila Sokolova)	2018	Non-album singles
"Amena"	2018	Non-album singles
"Пустота" (Soundtrack of the film "Непрощённый")	2018	Non-album singles
"Океан внутри тебя"	2019	Океан внутри тебя
"Доброе утро"	2019	Океан внутри тебя

Awards and achievements
Preceded by Mélovin	X-Factor Ukraine; Winner; 2016	Succeeded by Misha Panchishyn
Preceded by Artsvik with "Fly with Me"	Armenia in the Eurovision Song Contest; 2018	Succeeded by Srbuk with "Walking Out"
