= Sona (singer) =

Armenian singer (born 1973)

Sona Sarkisyan
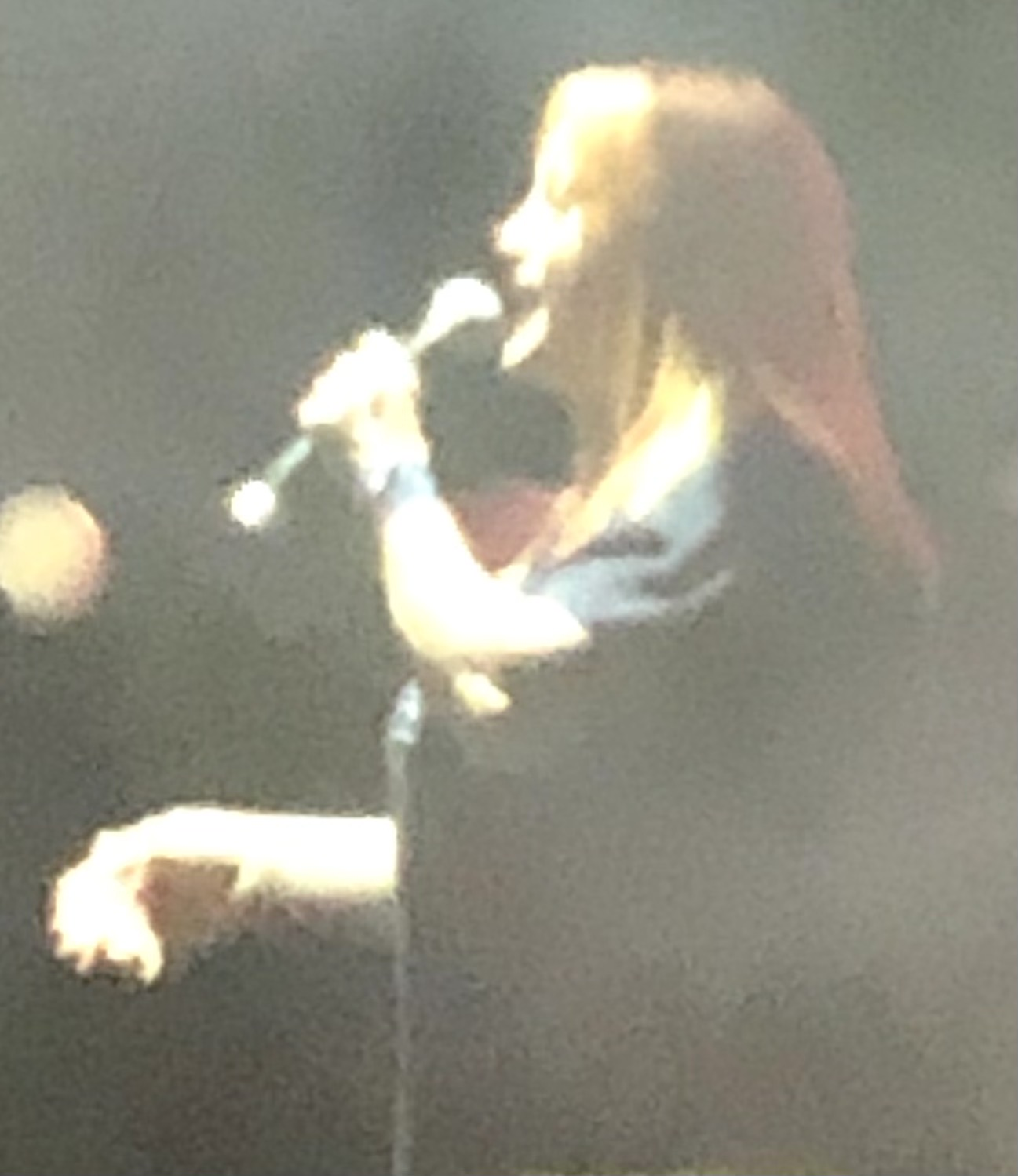

Background information
- Also known as: Sona
- Born: Sona Sarkisyan; July 15, 1973 (age 52); Yerevan, Armenia
- Origin: Yerevan, Armenia
- Genres: rock, jazz-rock
- Occupation: Singer
- Years active: 1991–present
- Website: www.sona.ru

Sona Sarkisyan (Armenian: Սոնա Սարկիսյան, born July 18, 1973), known as Sona, stylized as SONA, is an Armenian singer.

== Biography ==
Sona was born on July 15, 1973, in Yerevan.

== Career ==
Her solo career began in 1991 when she was 18 years old. In that year she participated on the Morning Star music competition show, qualifying for the final stage. In 1991 she recorded her first album, Sona, which was released in Spain. She also released two music videos: "Back to the Ancient World" and "Stay with Me." During this time, she collaborated with the producer Iosif Prigozhin.

From 1992 to 1994, she had a solo concert at the Moskvorechie Culture Home, participated in Boris Moiseev’s project, "Boris Moiseev and His People" in the role of "Lady Jazz", and was nominated as the Best Rock Singer of the Ovacia music contest. She acted in Mikayel Dovlatyan's 1996 movie Our Yard as well as the 1997 sequel.

In 1997, Sona, along with a number of Armenian jazz devotees, restarted the State Jazz Orchestra of Armenia under the leadership of Konstantin Orbelyan. Armen Martirosyan was selected as the artistic director of the orchestra, and Sona as the soloist.

In 2005, Sona participated in the "Yerevan–Moscow Transit" concert with Georgian singer Soso Pavliashvili. In December of the same year she recorded a music video of her song "Vsyo proydet" ("Everything will Pass") with director Alan Badoev. She also took part in such talk shows as Private Lives (RTR); Celebrity Dinner (Public Television of Armenia; which was broadcast in 75 countries); To you, my love; and Disputed Territory (MIR). In April 2006, she recorded a video for her new song "Serdce plachet" ("Heart Cries"), directed by Sergey Gorov. At the end of 2006, she performed a duet with the Manolo Gipsy Gitanes and released a music video for the song "Luna en el anima." It has been broadcast on Mexican, Italian, and American television. In December 2007, she performed a duet with Sergey Penkin in the concert "Yerevan–Moscow Transit 4." She also performed a duet with Boris Moyiseev at the concert devoted to Arno Babajanyan's 85th anniversary at the State Kremlin Palace. She also performed with Boris Moyiseev at the Soundtrack concert and in the Ladies and Gentlemen jubilee TV show in March 2007.

In 2008, before releasing her album Vsyo proydet, Sona had a concert in the State Variety Theatre, in Moscow. In the same year, the singer took part in the final gala concert of the project You are a superstar (NTV) and recorded the Pavel Kashin song "If you love…" for the Artefact movie soundtrack. She has participated in Kostantin Orbelyan's concerts in Moscow and Karabakh. In Minsk, she was a jury member of the Karot festival. She performed a duet with Mger Armenia at a concert devoted to Arno Babajanyan's 90th anniversary at the State Kremlin Palace. She was an honored guest at the 2012 Armenian Comedy Awards 2012 at the Rossia State Concert Hall on August 3 and 4. In 2012 she performed with the Manolo Gipsy Gitanes at a German harvest festival.

In 2013, Sona was a coach on The Voice of Armenia, which was broadcast on the Armenia TV Channel. Meri Mnjoyan, who was a member of Sona's team, won the competition. In 2014, Raisa Avannesyan, also from Sona's team, became the new winner of The Voice of Armenia. In 2015, Sona performed the duet "Do what you do" with Kevin McCoy of Bad Boys Blue. The song was played on Russian and foreign radio and TV channels. In Grozny, she had a concert devoted to disabled children, "Misfortune has no nationality," for which she won a prize. She was invited to Moscow to participate in The Union of Armenians in Russia Prize and was also awarded the Soglasie Prize. She had a number of concerts in Moscow.

In 2016, Sona and Manolo Gipsy Gitanes recorded the song "Baila Soledad" and an accompanying music video. It had its premiere in Moscow, at the Kremlin at Tashir show. Later in April she presented her new music video "You are my Life" with Mger Armenia.

== Albums ==
- Sona
- Все пройдет

== Filmography ==
As herself
Year	Title	Notes
2016	Benefis (Բենեֆիս)	Episode: "Sona"
