= Arame (singer) =

Armenian singer (born 1982)

Arame Արամե
- Born: Aram Marati Eghiazaryan; 10 October 1982 (age 43); Armavir, Armenian SSR, Soviet Union
- Genres: Pop; Folk
- Occupation: Singer
- Instrument: Singing
- Years active: 2004–present
- Website: www.youtube.com/user/ArameOfficial

Aram Marati Eghiazaryan (Note: Armenian: Արամ Մարատի Եղիազարյան, romanized: Aram Marati Eghiazaryan) (born 10 October 1982, better known by his stage name Arame) (Note: Armenian: Արամե, romanized: Arame) is an Armenian pop singer. In 2017, he was awarded with the title of Honored Artist of Armenia by then-President Serzh Sargsyan. Arame was also named the best singer of the year twice in 2007 and 2010.

== Discography ==
- Anzhayn (2007)
- Yaris Boye (2008)
- Mi Kich Ser (2009)
- Im Kyanqi 27-rt Aravot (2010)
- Im Miak Sirelis (2011)
- Qavor (2014)
- 10 Tari Miasin (2016)

== Filmography ==
As himself
Year	Title	Notes
2007–2008	Two Stars (Երկու աստղ)	with Hrachuhi Utmazyan
2016	Benefis (Բենեֆիս)	Episode: Arame
2018	Evening Azoyan (Երեկոյան Ազոյան)	Episode: #3
