= Honored Artist of Armenia =

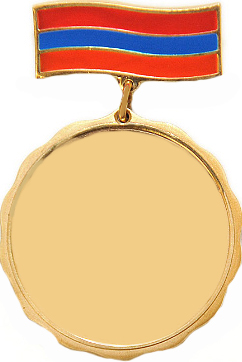
- Awarded for: Excellence and outstanding achievement
- Country: Armenia
- Presented by: President of Armenia
- First award: 2004

Honored Artist of Armenia is an award given by the Republic of Armenia. It was established in 2002 as "Honorary Titles of the Republic of Armenia in Science, Education, Journalism, Culture, Arts, Health, Physical Culture and Sports". The award was reestablished in 2004 with the adoption of the National Assembly and the signature of the Armenian president. The first awards were given in 2008 by the Armenian president Serzh Sargsyan. Currently, 115 Armenian citizens and one United States citizen have received the award.
