= Erik Karapetyan =

Armenian singer-songwriter (born 1988)

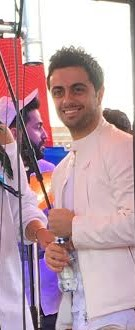

Background information
- Born: Erik Karapetyan; 5 June 1988 (age 37); Tbilisi, Georgian SSR, Soviet Union
- Genres: Pop
- Occupation: Singer-songwriter
- Years active: 2008–present

Erik Valerayi Karapetyan (Armenian: Էրիկ Վալերայի Կարապետյան; born 5 June 1988), better known as simply Erik, is an Armenian singer-songwriter. He represented Armenia in the 2011 New Wave international contest for young performers and achieved fifth place. He also won "Audience's Choice" of that competition. In 2016, he became one of the jury members of the Armenian X-Factor.

== Life and career ==
=== Early life ===
Karapetyan was born on 5 June 1988 in Tbilisi. In 2005, he graduated from Tbilisi's Dzabatdze N79 Georgian School, in which he subsequently studied violin, and after the graduation he transferred to Yerevan. There, he started to study in the Komitas State Conservatory of Yerevan until 2011.

=== Career ===
In 2021, he won the first edition of Masquerade, the Armenian version of the Masked Singer contest.

=== Songs ===
Song name	Year	Album
Hoy Nar	2010	-
Yerani imanam	2013	-
Arajin u miak	2013	-
Anirakan	2014	-
Im karotn e	2014	-
I'll do anything	2014	-
Anhasaneli	2015	-
Siro Zanger	2015	-
Im poqrik	2015	-
Ser	2016	-
Gaghtniq u Karot	2016	-
Im amenalav	2016	-
Tiezerq	2017	-
Im sireli	2017	-
Im ashxarh ek	2018	-
Erazanqi im see	2018	-
Siraharvats	2018	-
Voch avel, voch pakas	2019	-
Irenov Ani	2019	-
Zovi	2020	-
Baxte Im	2020	-
Ser lines	2020	-
En vor asum en	2021	-
Lovi Lovi	2020	Siro Pandemia
Sirts Tsavi	2020	Siro Pandemia
Qani or, Qani gisher	2020	Siro Pandemia
Qani Kam	2020	Siro Pandemia
Im u qo	2020	Siro Pandemia

== Filmography ==
List of appearance on television as himself
Year	Title	Notes
2008	Two Stars	with Masha Matveeva
2016	X-factor (Իքս-Ֆակտոր)	Judge/Mentor
2016	Benefis (Բենեֆիս)	Special guest
2017	Full House (Ֆուլ Հաուս)	Guest
2017	Hayastan Jan (Հայաստան Ջան)	Contestant

== Awards and achievements ==
Erik Karapetyan has received these awards:

Year	Award	Category	City	Result
2006	Yntsa Awards	The Grand Prize	Yerevan	Won
2007	Discovery International Music Festival	The Grand Prize	Bulgaria	Won
2011	New Wave	Audience Choice	Jūrmala	Won
2011	National Music awards.	The Best Singer of Year	Yerevan	Won
2012	Armenian National Awards	The Best Singer of the Year	Yerevan	Won
2013	World Armenian Entertainment	Best song of the year	USA	Won
2015	Armenian Pulse Music Awards	Best Pop Song	Yerevan	Won
2016	Pan Armenian Entertainment Awards	The Best Concert Singer	Los Angeles	Won
2017	The Armenian Music Awards	The Best singer of the Year	Paris	Won
2018	Tsitsernak National Music Awards	The Best singer of the Year	Yerevan	Won
2021	The Masked Singer Armenia	Winner	Yerevan	Won
