= Nune Yesayan =

Armenian singer (born 1969)

Nune
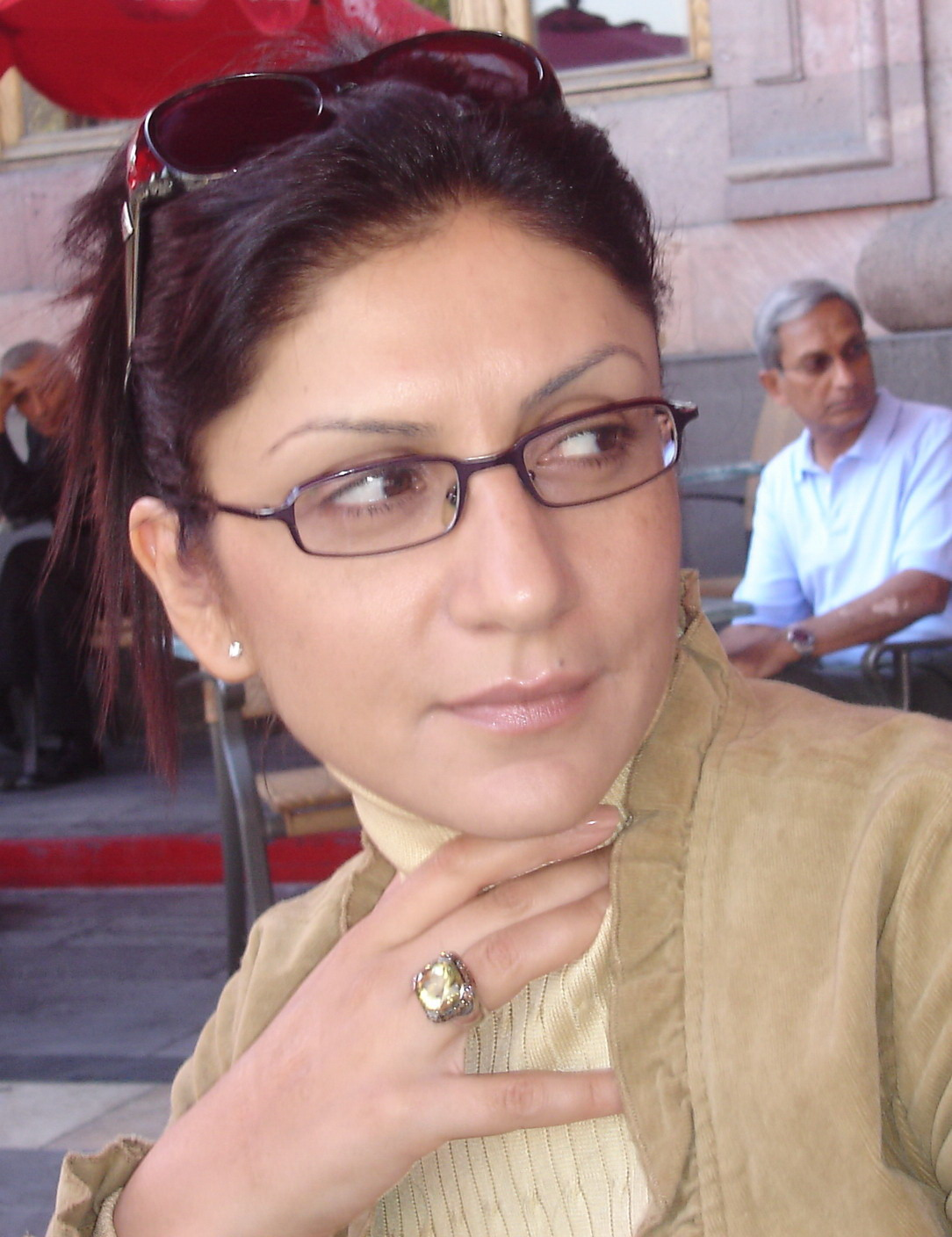
- Yesayan in 2006

Background information
- Born: August 5, 1969 (age 57); Yerevan, Armenian SSR, Soviet Union
- Occupation: pop singer
- Years active: 1988–present
- Website: www.nune.am

Nune Martiki Yesayan (Armenian: Նունե Մարտիկի Եսայան; born August 5, 1969), commonly known as Nune or Nouné, is an Armenian singer who began singing with an Armenian jazz band in the early 1990s before becoming a lounge singer at resorts in the Middle East.

== Biography ==
=== Education ===
Even before studying music in college, Yesayan made a name for herself at her high school for being a gifted vocalist and talented performer. She graduated from high school in 1986 and was accepted to the Polytechnic University of Yerevan to study engineering.

During her first year in college, Nune excelled in her engineering studies and received high marks in both mathematics and physics. She spent her time away from school performing Armenian folk music with an amateur band. The group, which included long-time friend and collaborator Arthur Hagopian, appeared at small venues and a few concerts.

After successfully completing her first year of course work at the Polytechnic University in 1987, Nune decided to change her major and focus on her passion for music. She applied for admission and was accepted to the Jazz and Pop College of Yerevan, where she began her studies in the fall of 1988.

Nune's teachers and vocal coaches at the Jazz and Pop College included famed Armenian jazz performer Datevig Hovanissian and Yerevan's most prolific pop producer, composer Arthur Grigorian. In addition to her intense rehearsal and study schedule at the college, Nune performed regularly at Grigorian's Yerevan jazz club, "Azad Jamantz".

Following graduation from the Jazz and Pop College in 1990, Nune auditioned and was accepted into the Armenian National Jazz Orchestra. Under the direction of famed composer and conductor Constantine Orbelian, Nune performed with the Orchestra in Armenia and throughout the former Soviet Union, singing Armenian folk songs and jazz standards.

=== Career ===
Nune's first television appearance as a solo act was on the "Ayo" television program, a show similar to "Pop Idol". Nune won the highest possible scores from a panel of judges, retained the title of "top female vocalist" for the entire length of the television season and quickly became a household name in Armenia.

Similar successes followed in 1990 and 1991, when Nune participated in two more nationally televised talent competition shows. Nune was named "Miss Soul" in 1990 and "Best Female Vocalist" at the Asoop (Comet) Award Show in 1991. Accolades and honors from domestic and international awards shows including the "Armenian Music Awards" in Los Angeles have continued and included honors for best album, the best music video, best concert and best female vocalist.

Nune recorded her first album of traditional Armenian songs in 1991. It was produced by Garbis Titizian and Prime Entertainment. Arthur Hagopian, who was part of Nune's first amateur band, arranged the album using modern instruments and contemporary arrangements. The music video for her rendition of the folks song "Kele Lao" was an immediate hit in the Armenian Diaspora and a regular staple of the US-based Armenian television station, Horizon.

In 1991 and 1992, Nune was invited by her former teacher, Arthur Grigorian, to perform in shows he produced. Her appearances on television with Grigorian's group were a hit, and the group's concerts were always sold out.

After the fall of the Soviet Union, harsh economic conditions in Armenia forced Nune to seek employment opportunities abroad. Her ability to sing in many languages and in various styles won her contracts at 5 Star hotels in the Middle East. During her concerts and small-venue shows, Nune sang contemporary hits, pop and jazz standards and songs in English, Arabic, French and Armenian.

Upon her return to Armenia in 1997, Nune partnered again with Prime Entertainment in an effort to distribute her CDs internationally. Executive Producer Garbis Titizian arranged for the release of Nune's first CD and the recording and distribution of her second album, World.

In 1998, Nune formed her own band, which continues to work with her today. Together with her musicians, Nune took her band on the road throughout Armenia, performing benefit concerts for the Armenia Fund, an organization which fund the development of Armenia's infrastructure. Her musical range has expanded from singing traditional Armenian folk songs to include singing new songs written specially for her.

Nune's North American debut took place at the Pasadena Civic Center Auditorium in Southern California. Because of her hit music videos and popular CDs, Nune sold out her first concert in the US and enjoyed unexpected and unprecedented attention during her appearances at Armenian schools and record stores.

In 2001, her concert in honor of those who lost their lives during the September 11 attacks, was attended by nearly eight thousand people and mentioned on the CNN "World Report" and the Mir and Associated Press television news services.

Nune's most notable concert venues have included the Hamaleer Sport Complex in Armenia, the Universal Amphitheatre in Los Angeles, the Kodak Theatre in Hollywood and the Lincoln Center in New York City. She has also appeared in concert with famed Armenian-Persian singer Andy and French idol Patrick Fiori. Her largest audiences to date was at a charity concert she performed at the Cascade in Yerevan. The open-air concert attracted more than 35,000 fans.

=== Public activities ===
In 2019, she signed a petition in defense of former president Robert Kocharyan which caused public critics.

=== Charity ===
In addition to her charity concerts, Nune has continued to dedicate her time and efforts to helping her homeland and her people. She has appeared as a host and guest of the globally telecast Armenia Fund Telethon in 2000 and 2004 and continues to enjoy press coverage in Armenia, Russia and in Armenian publications throughout the Diaspora.

Even mainstream American media, including the New York Times and Boston Globe, have taken note of her fame and written about her phenomenal fame and status among her people and her impact on the world of Armenian music.

== Discography ==
=== Studio albums ===
- Kavare Mer (1998)
- Who Knows (1999)
- World (2000)
- Nune (2001)
- Love (2002)
- Sayat Nova (2003)
- Me (2004)
- Nune: International Album (2005)
- Dle Yaman (2006)
- Sold Out (2012)
- I Love You (2014)

=== Compilation albums ===
- The Best Of (2009)
- The Best Collection (2017)

=== Live Albums ===
- Live (2008)

=== Music videos ===
- Khkhcha
- Mi Bala
- Ari Yar
- Inchu Es Kez Sireci
- Konn Em
- Vooy Nare
- Gheseye Eshgh (feat. Martik)
- I’m easy (Просто это я)
- Romance
- Agha Jan (feat. Armen Aghajanyan)
- Dle Yaman (feat. Djivan Gasparyan)
- Miayn Es Ev Du (feat. Arsen Grigoryan)
- Nairyan Dalar Bardi
- Hasarak Mard
- Es Uzum Em
