= Mukuchyan =

Mukuchyan (Armenian: Մուկուչյան) is an Armenian surname. Notable people with this surname may include:

- Iveta Mukuchyan (born 1986), Armenian-German singer-songwriter
- Marianna Mukuchyan (born 1984), Armenian-German make-up artist
- Aida Mukuchyan (born 1987), Armenian artist
- Ani Mukuchyan (born 2006), Armenian artist
