= Armenia in the Eurovision Song Contest 2016 =

- Eurovision Song Contest 2016
- Participating broadcaster: Public Television of Armenia (AMPTV)
- Country: Armenia
- Selection process: Internal selection
- Announcement date: Artist: 13 October 2015; Song: 2 March 2016

Competing entry
- Song: "LoveWave"
- Artist: Iveta Mukuchyan
- Songwriters: Lilith Navasardyan; Levon Navasardyan; Iveta Mukuchyan; Stephanie Crutchfield

Placement
- Semi-final result: Qualified (2nd, 243 points)
- Final result: 7th, 249 points

Participation chronology

Armenia was represented at the Eurovision Song Contest 2016 with the song "LoveWave" written by Lilith Navasardyan, Levon Navasardyan, Iveta Mukuchyan and Stephanie Crutchfield. The song was performed by Iveta Mukuchyan, who was selected internally by the Armenian broadcaster Public Television of Armenia (AMPTV) to represent Armenia in the 2016 contest in Stockholm, Sweden. Mukuchyan's selection as the Armenian artist was announced on 13 October 2015, while the song "LoveWave" was later presented to the public on 2 March 2016.

Armenia was drawn to compete in the first semi-final of the Eurovision Song Contest which took place on 10 May 2016. Performing during the show in position 7, "LoveWave" was announced among the top 10 entries of the first semi-final and therefore qualified to compete in the final on 14 May. It was later revealed that Armenia placed second out of the 18 participating countries in the semi-final with 243 points. In the final, Armenia was the closing performance of the show in position 26, placing seventh out of the 26 participating countries with 249 points.

== Background ==
Prior to the 2016 contest, Armenia had participated in the Eurovision Song Contest nine times since its first entry in 2006. Its highest placing in the contest, to this point, has been fourth place, which the nation achieved on two occasions: in 2008 with the song "Qélé, Qélé" performed by Sirusho and in 2014 with the song "Not Alone" performed by Aram Mp3. Armenia had, to this point, failed to qualify to the final on only one occasion in 2011. The nation briefly withdrew from the contest in 2012 due to long-standing tensions with then host country Azerbaijan. In 2015, "Face the Shadow" performed by the group Genealogy, whose members were from the worldwide Armenian diaspora, placed sixteenth in the final.

The Armenian national broadcaster, Public Television of Armenia (AMPTV), broadcasts the event within Armenia and organises the selection process for the nation's entry. AMPTV confirmed their intentions to participate at the 2016 Eurovision Song Contest on 25 September 2015. Armenia has used various methods to select the Armenian entry in the past, such as a live televised national final to choose the performer, song or both to compete at Eurovision. However internal selections have also been held on occasion. In 2014, the broadcaster internally selected both the artist and the song, a procedure that had only been used once before to select Armenia's debut entry in 2006. The broadcaster also opted to internally select both the 2015 and 2016 Armenian entries.

== Before Eurovision ==
=== Internal selection ===
The Armenian entry for the Eurovision Song Contest 2016 was internally selected by the AMPTV. On 25 September 2015, the broadcaster released a teaser video indicating that an artist had been selected and that their name would be announced on 13 October 2015. During the AMPTV programme Profession – Journalist on 13 October, Iveta Mukuchyan was announced as the Armenian representative. In regards to her selection as the Armenian entrant, Mukuchyan stated: "I'm very happy, thankful and honored to be chosen by the Public TV Company of Armenia to represent Armenia. I love Eurovision and it's amazing to get a chance to represent my country on the big stage. Your support is very important to me, so I hope you will be next to me on this responsible and important journey." Following their artist reveal, AMPTV announced a public call for song submissions with a deadline of 13 November 2015. Mukuchyan later announced in December 2015 that several songs were submitted by songwriters worldwide and that two songs, one from Armenia and one from Sweden, were under consideration.

The song "LoveWave", composed by Lilith Navasardyan and Levon Navasardyan with lyrics by Iveta Mukuchyan and Stephanie Crutchfield, was announced as the Armenian entry on 19 February 2016. Mukuchyan filmed the official video for the song prior to the presentation, which was a co-production between AMPTV and the German company Blacksheep Communications and featured Swedish model Ben Dahlhaus and fashion designs by Arevik Simonyan. The song and video were presented to the public on 2 March 2016.

We received more than 300 songs for the contest. I've personally wrote 4 of them. But as soon as I heard this one, I knew that was it. There was absolutely no doubt. The melody reminded me of waves – big, beautiful and powerful. It grows becoming bigger and bigger to finally explode and calm down in a single moment, preparing to rise again. In the first part of the lyrics there is a sentence that I think describes this song the best: "It's like I've stepped out of space and time and come alive."

— Iveta Mukuchyan

=== Promotion ===
Prior to the contest, Iveta Mukuchyan specifically promoted "LoveWave" as the Armenian Eurovision entry on 3 April 2016 by performing during the Eurovision Pre-Party, which was held at the Izvestia Hall in Moscow, Russia and hosted by Dmitry Guberniev. Mukuchyan had also planned to take part in the Eurovision in Concert event on 9 April which was held at the Melkweg venue in Amsterdam, Netherlands, however, her participation was cancelled in light of the 2016 Armenian–Azerbaijani clashes.

== At Eurovision ==
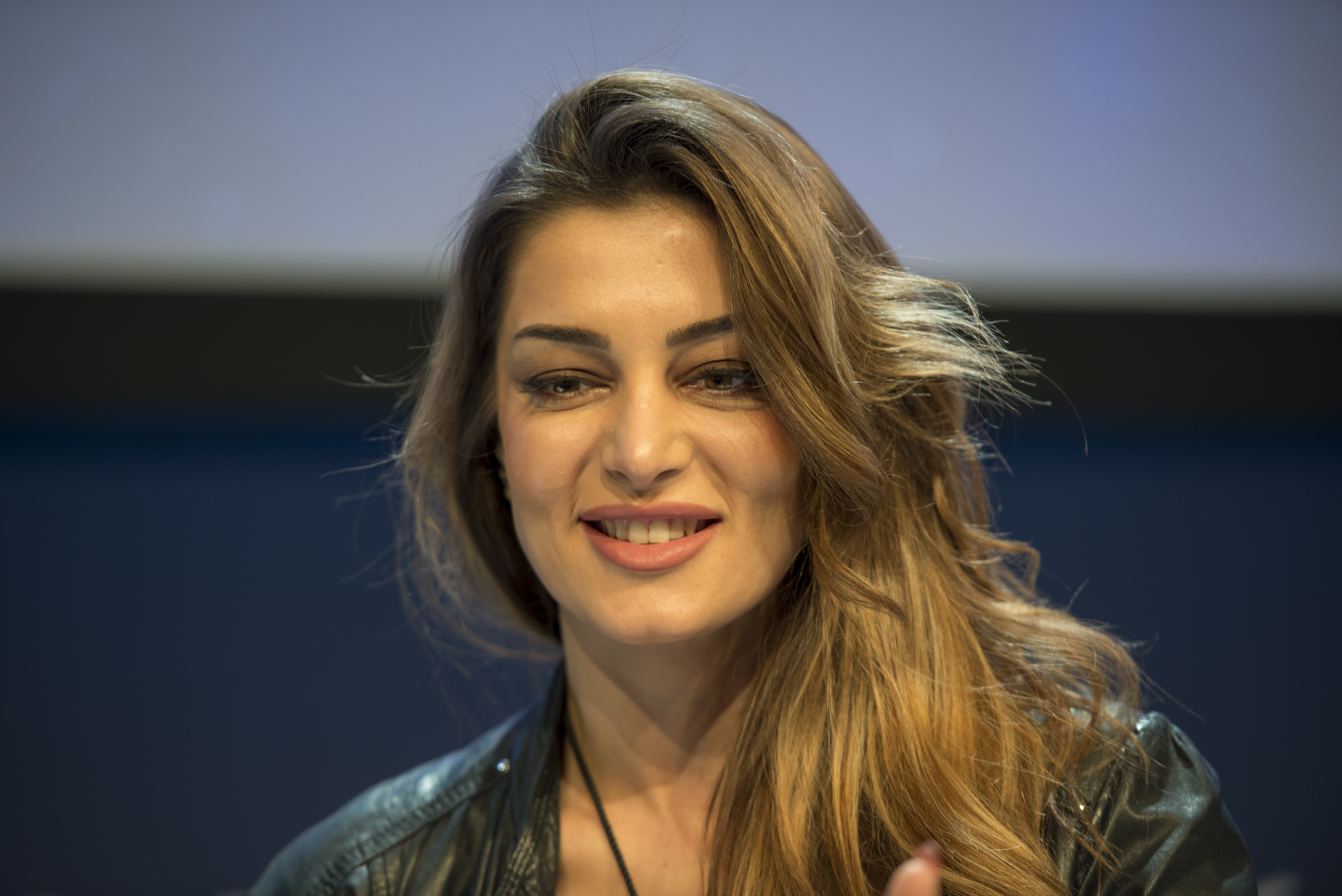
Iveta Mukuchyan during a press meet and greet

All countries except the "Big Five" (France, Germany, Italy, Spain and the United Kingdom), and the host country, are required to qualify from one of two semi-finals in order to compete for the final; the top ten countries from each semi-final progress to the final. The European Broadcasting Union (EBU) split up the competing countries into six different pots based on voting patterns from previous contests, with countries with favourable voting histories put into the same pot. On 25 January 2016, a special allocation draw was held which placed each country into one of the two semi-finals, as well as which half of the show they would perform in. Armenia was placed into the first semi-final, to be held on 10 May 2016, and was scheduled to perform in the first half of the show.

Once all the competing songs for the 2016 contest had been released, the running order for the semi-finals was decided by the shows' producers rather than through another draw, so that similar songs were not placed next to each other. Armenia was set to perform in position 7, following the entry from the Netherlands and before the entry from San Marino.

In Armenia, the two semi-finals and the final were broadcast on Armenia 1 and Public Radio of Armenia with commentary by Avet Barseghyan. The Armenian spokesperson, who announced the top 12-point score awarded by the Armenian jury during the final, was Arman Margaryan.

=== Semi-final ===
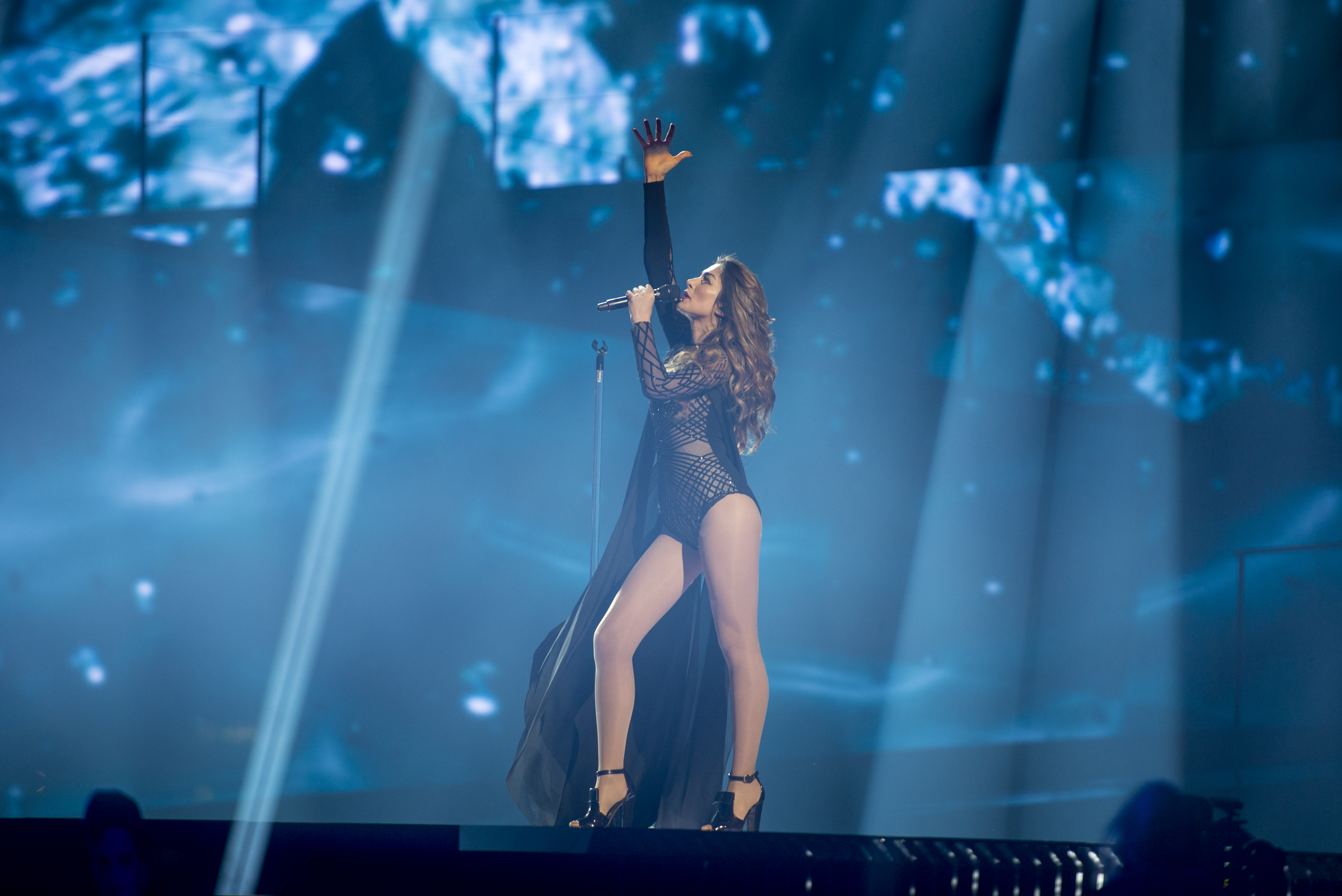
Iveta Mukuchyan during a rehearsal before the first semi-final

Iveta Mukuchyan took part in technical rehearsals on 2 and 6 May, followed by dress rehearsals on 9 and 10 May. This included the jury show on 9 May where the professional juries of each country watched and voted on the competing entries.

The Armenian performance featured Iveta Mukuchyan dressed in a black outfit with a cape performing an interpretive routine alone on stage. The stage presentation included holographic duplicates of Iveta on stage and pyrotechnic flame effects throughout the performance. The LED screens projected fast moving designs and the stage lighting displayed blue and red colours with white spotlights. The stage director and choreographer for the Armenian performance was Sacha Jean-Baptiste. Iveta Mukuchyan was joined by five off-stage backing vocalists: Anushik Ter-Ghukasyan, Masha Mnjoyan, Christina Mangasaryan, Sona Gyulkhasyan and the co-composer of "LoveWave" Lilith Navasardyan.

At the end of the show, Armenia was announced as having finished in the top 10 and subsequently qualifying for the grand final. It was later revealed that Armenia placed second in the semi-final, receiving a total of 243 points: 116 points from the televoting and 127 points from the juries.

=== Final ===
Shortly after the first semi-final, a winners' press conference was held for the ten qualifying countries. As part of this press conference, the qualifying artists took part in a draw to determine which half of the grand final they would subsequently participate in. This draw was done in the order the countries appeared in the semi-final running order. Armenia was drawn to compete in the second half. Following this draw, the shows' producers decided upon the running order of the final, as they had done for the semi-finals. Armenia was subsequently placed to perform last in position 26, following the entry from the United Kingdom.

Iveta Mukuchyan once again took part in dress rehearsals on 13 and 14 May before the final, including the jury final where the professional juries cast their final votes before the live show. Iveta Mukuchyan performed a repeat of her semi-final performance during the final on 14 May. Armenia placed seventh in the final, scoring 249 points: 134 points from the televoting and 115 points from the juries.

=== Voting ===
Voting during the three shows was conducted under a new system that involved each country now awarding two sets of points from 1-8, 10 and 12: one from their professional jury and the other from televoting. Each nation's jury consisted of five music industry professionals who are citizens of the country they represent, with their names published before the contest to ensure transparency. This jury judged each entry based on: vocal capacity; the stage performance; the song's composition and originality; and the overall impression by the act. In addition, no member of a national jury was permitted to be related in any way to any of the competing acts in such a way that they cannot vote impartially and independently. The individual rankings of each jury member as well as the nation's televoting results were released shortly after the grand final.

Below is a breakdown of points awarded to Armenia and awarded by Armenia in the first semi-final and grand final of the contest, and the breakdown of the jury voting and televoting conducted during the two shows:

==== Points awarded to Armenia ====
Points awarded to Armenia (Semi-final 1)
Score	Televote	Jury
12 points	Czech Republic; France; Netherlands; Russia	Malta; Montenegro; Russia; Spain
10 points	Spain	Cyprus; Greece; Moldova
8 points	Greece; Moldova; San Marino	
7 points	Cyprus	Bosnia and Herzegovina; Finland
6 points		
5 points		Austria; Croatia; Hungary; Iceland; Netherlands; Sweden
4 points	Austria; Malta	
3 points	Bosnia and Herzegovina; Croatia; Iceland; Montenegro; Sweden	France
2 points	Hungary	Estonia
1 point	Estonia; Finland	

Points awarded to Armenia (Final)
Score	Televote	Jury
12 points	France; Georgia; Russia	Bulgaria; Russia; Spain
10 points		Greece; Montenegro
8 points	Bulgaria; Cyprus; Czech Republic; Greece; Netherlands	Cyprus
7 points	Belarus; Belgium; Macedonia; Moldova; Ukraine	Malta
6 points	Israel; Spain	Latvia
5 points		Moldova
4 points		Croatia; Lithuania; Slovenia; Sweden
3 points		Belarus; Serbia
2 points	Albania; Germany; Poland; San Marino; Serbia	Austria; Bosnia and Herzegovina; France; Israel; Netherlands
1 point	Italy	Hungary

==== Points awarded by Armenia ====
Points awarded by Armenia (Semi-final 1)
Score	Televote	Jury
12 points	Russia	Malta
10 points	Malta	Montenegro
8 points	Cyprus	Finland
7 points	Greece	Russia
6 points	Hungary	Moldova
5 points	Austria	Czech Republic
4 points	Netherlands	Netherlands
3 points	Croatia	Greece
2 points	Czech Republic	Croatia
1 point	Bosnia and Herzegovina	Bosnia and Herzegovina

Points awarded by Armenia (Final)
Score	Televote	Jury
12 points	Russia	France
10 points	Ukraine	Georgia
8 points	Georgia	Malta
7 points	France	Bulgaria
6 points	Cyprus	Cyprus
5 points	Malta	Australia
4 points	Austria	Belgium
3 points	Hungary	Spain
2 points	Sweden	Russia
1 point	Poland	Czech Republic

==== Detailed voting results ====
The following members comprised the Armenian jury:

- Hayk Hakobyan (Hayko) (jury chairperson) – musician, songwriter, producer, represented Armenia in the 2007 contest
- Naira Gyurjinyan – musician, songwriter
- Erik Karapetyan (Erik) – singer, songwriter
- Vardan Babayan (DJ Dale) – DJ, producer, head of "Armenian DJs Association", "The Sunside Band" owner
- Miqayel Voskanyan – musician, composer

Detailed voting results from Armenia (Semi-final 1)
R/O	Country	Jury							Televote	
R/O	Country	Hayko	DJ Dale	N. Gyurjinyan	Erik	M. Voskanyan	Rank	Points	Rank	Points
01	Finland	4	3	4	6	3	3	8	13	
02	Greece	7	7	9	10	9	8	3	4	7
03	Moldova	6	6	6	4	6	5	6	15	
04	Hungary	16	16	5	8	16	12		5	6
05	Croatia	8	9	8	11	7	9	2	8	3
06	Netherlands	9	8	7	9	8	7	4	7	4
07	Armenia									
08	San Marino	15	13	15	3	15	13		11	
09	Russia	3	4	3	7	4	4	7	1	12
10	Czech Republic	5	5	11	5	5	6	5	9	2
11	Cyprus	14	12	12	15	13	15		3	8
12	Austria	12	14	16	16	14	16		6	5
13	Estonia	10	15	14	12	11	14		12	
14	Azerbaijan	17	17	17	17	17	17		17	
15	Montenegro	2	2	2	2	2	2	10	16	
16	Iceland	13	11	10	13	12	11		14	
17	Bosnia and Herzegovina	11	10	13	14	10	10	1	10	1
18	Malta	1	1	1	1	1	1	12	2	10

Detailed voting results from Armenia (Final)
R/O	Country	Jury							Televote	
R/O	Country	Hayko	DJ Dale	N. Gyurjinyan	Erik	M. Voskanyan	Rank	Points	Rank	Points
01	Belgium	12	6	9	6	6	7	4	17	
02	Czech Republic	13	14	12	8	9	10	1	18	
03	Netherlands	11	12	14	16	10	11		11	
04	Azerbaijan	25	25	25	19	25	25		25	
05	Hungary	23	22	10	22	11	18		8	3
06	Italy	14	13	19	25	20	20		14	
07	Israel	20	24	22	17	24	24		24	
08	Bulgaria	4	4	5	5	4	4	7	15	
09	Sweden	21	8	18	21	18	17		9	2
10	Germany	22	23	20	18	15	21		19	
11	France	1	1	1	1	1	1	12	4	7
12	Poland	24	10	24	24	22	23		10	1
13	Australia	6	9	6	9	8	6	5	12	
14	Cyprus	10	3	4	3	5	5	6	5	6
15	Serbia	9	21	11	11	14	12		23	
16	Lithuania	16	15	16	10	19	14		21	
17	Croatia	15	19	17	13	17	15		22	
18	Russia	5	17	7	7	16	9	2	1	12
19	Spain	8	7	8	12	7	8	3	13	
20	Latvia	17	11	13	15	12	13		16	
21	Ukraine	7	20	21	14	23	16		2	10
22	Malta	3	5	3	4	3	3	8	6	5
23	Georgia	2	2	2	2	2	2	10	3	8
24	Austria	18	16	23	20	21	22		7	4
25	United Kingdom	19	18	15	23	13	19		20	
26	Armenia									
