= Hayastan Jan =

Single by Iveta Mukuchyan
- Language: Armenian
- English title: "Dear Armenia"
- Released: 11 August 2017
- Recorded: 2017
- Genre: Pop
- Length: 3:35
- Label: Mukuchyan
- Songwriter(s): Avet Barseghyan
- Producer(s): Iveta Mukuchyan

Iveta Mukuchyan singles chronology
"De Jpta (Note: "De Jpta" was originally credited as "Aram Mp3 featuring Mihran Tsarukyan, Iveta Mukuchyan, Anahit Shahbazyan, Roland Gasparyan, Erik, Christine Pepelyan, Yana Hovhannisyan and Mkrtich Arzumanyan".)" (2017)	"Hayastan Jan" (2017)	"Depi Nor Irakanutyun" (2017)

"Hayastan Jan" is a song by Armenian-German singer-songwriter Iveta Mukuchyan. It was released as a single on August 11, 2017, however the music video was released earlier. "Hayastan Jan" was written by Armenian songwriter and TV host Avet Barseghyan and composed by Mukuchyan. On 23 September 2017, Armenia 1 launched a new game show of the same name. Hosted by the songwriter of the track, it had "Hayastan Jan" as its theme music. The song became popular among Armenian diaspora, especially in Lebanon, where it topped the top 10 list of Radio Sevan. On 27 September 2018, the song won a "Song of the Year" award during the ceremony of the same name in Sochi, Russia.

== Background and release ==
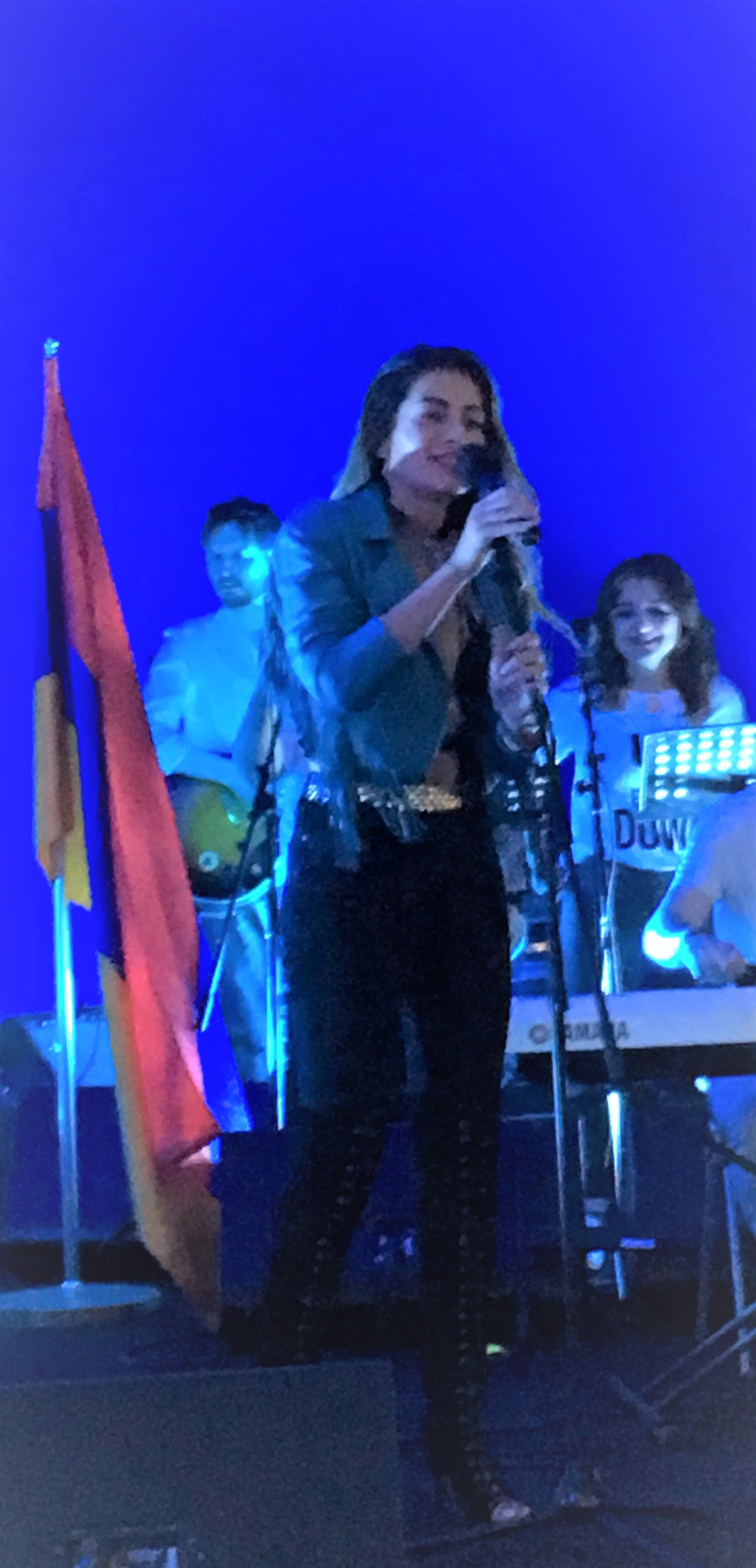
Mukuchyan performing the song on the Europe Day

"Hayastan Jan"
A sample of "Hayastan Jan", featuring Armenian traditional music along with domestic animal voices at the beginning of the song.

On 21 June 2017, the song's title and the music video's release date was announced via a Facebook post by Mukuchyan. Five day later the song premiered on the singer's YouTube channel.

== Music video ==
The music video for "Hayastan Jan" was shot in an Armenian village, and features Mukuchyan celebrating her country with plenty of traditional sounds and colors. It is the production of Karen Sevak. On June 21, 2017, a teaser of the video was uploaded on Mukuchyan's YouTube channel. The video for "Hayastan Jan" premiered on June 26, 2017. The video opens with two villagers driving through the countryside while listening to a snippet of "LoveWave" on the radio.

== Performances ==
Mukuchyan has performed the song on many occasions and house parties. She made the first televised performance of the track on the premiere day of Hayastan Jan series. In September 2017, she performed the song on another television program Post Factum airing on Armenia TV. The song was also performed at the KAMI Music Club on 1 May 2018 at Mukuchyan's concert. On Motherhood and Beauty Day, the singer was the special guest of the RIO Mall card presentation, where she performed her famous songs including this one. During the 2018 Armenian protests, the song was played on both Prime Minister election days at the Republic Square, Yerevan. The song was also performed during her collaborative concert with SONA and Ara Martirosyan at the Aram Khachaturian Grand Concert Hall on 31 May 2018. On Europe Day in Armenia, the singer performed an open-air concert at Northern Avenue, Yerevan, where "Hayastan Jan" was also present. Mukuchyan also performed the song at "Song of the Year" awards in Sochi, Russia on 27 September 2018.
