= Avet Barseghyan =

Armenian musician and television host

- Ավետ Բարսեղյան
- Born: 23 July 1980 (age 46); Yerevan, Armenian SSR, Soviet Union
- Education: Armenian State Pedagogical University
- Occupations: Songwriter and television presenter
- Years active: 2001–present
- Employers: TV 5; Armenia 1; New Channel TV; Sigma TV; Shant TV; Armenia TV
- Height: 175 cm (5 ft 9 in)

Avet Vardgesi Barseghyan (Armenian: Ավետ Վարդգեսի Բարսեղյան, Armenian pronunciation: [ɑˈvɛt bɑɾsɛʁˈjɑn]) is an Armenian songwriter and TV host, who hosted the Junior Eurovision Song Contest 2011 in Yerevan, Armenia, alongside Gohar Gasparyan.

Barseghyan has also written several of Armenia's entries for both the Eurovision Song Contest and the Junior Eurovision Song Contest, as well as being the country's commentator since 2015. He hosted the third season of the Armenian edition of The X Factor.

== Filmography ==
=== Television ===
Year(s)	Title	Role	Channel & Network	Notes	Ref.
2001–2003	Bonus Intellectual	Presenter	TV5		
2003–2009	Krunk	Presenter	Armenia 1	with Nazeni Hovhannisyan	
2004–2009	First Program	Presenter	Armenia 1	with Nazeni Hovhannisyan, Felix Xachatryan, Anna Avanesyan	
2005–2008	Bonus Intellectual Telegame	Presenter	Armenia 1, New Channel, Sigma TV		
2006 February 3	Emmy – First CD Presentation Solo Concert	Presenter, Script	Armenia 1	with Arsen Grigoryan, Hrach Muradyan	
2007–2009	Hot 10	Presenter	Armenia 1, New Channel, Sigma TV	with Shprot	
2007 April 1	32 Teeth Club	Presenter	Armenia 1, Sigma TV, 32 Production	with Felix Xachatryan	
2007 April 12	Arsen Safaryan – Just 30	Presenter	Armenia 1, New Channel		
2008	Power of 10	Presenter	Shant TV	Armenian version	
2009–2015	Who Wants to Be a Millionaire?	Presenter	Shant TV	Armenian version	
2009–2010	Hay Superstar	Presenter	Shant TV	Armenian version	
2009–2011	Good Morning	Presenter	Shant TV, Armenia TV		
2009–2010	Devotees of Duduk	Presenter	Shant TV		
2010–2011	Good Night Armenians, True or false?	Presenter	Armenia TV		
2011–2012	Ultra Dark	Presenter	Shant TV		
2011	Junior Eurovision Song Contest	Presenter	Armenia 1	with Gohar Gasparyan	
2013–2014	Tasty Duel	Presenter	Armenia 1		
2014–2016	Junior Eurovision Song Contest	Commentator	Armenia 1	Armenian broadcast	
2014	The X Factor	Presenter	Shant TV	Armenian season 3	
2015–2019	Eurovision Song Contest	Commentator	Armenia 1	Armenian broadcast	
2015–2016	Name that Tune	Presenter	Armenia 1		
2016–2017	Benefis	Presenter	Armenia 1		
2017–2018	Hayastan Jan	Presenter	Armenia 1		
2018	Swallow Music Awards	Presenter	Armenia 1	with Nazeni Hovhannisyan	
2019–2021	You Know	Presenter	Armenia 1		
2019	Excellent	Presenter	Armenia 1		

=== Film ===
Year(s)	Title	Role	Notes
2009	Maestro	Son of Armen Tigranian	

== Discography ==
Barseghyan is credited as a songwriter of the following songs:

Year	Song	Artist	Songwriter(s)	Peak chart positions		Notes	Ref.
Year	Song	Artist	Songwriter(s)	SWE	UK	Notes	Ref.
2009	"Jan Jan" (Ջան Ջան)	Inga and Anush	Mane Hakobyan, Vardan Zadoyan, Avet Barseghyan	29	159	(Note: Represented Armenia in the Eurovision Song Contest 2009. Placed 10th with 92 points.) (Note: From the Inga and Anush album Menq Enq Mer Sarerệ (Մենք Ենք Մեր Սարերը).)	
2009	"Menq enq mer sarere" (Մենք ենք մեր սարերը)	Inga and Anush	Mane Hakobyan, Avet Barseghyan	–	–		
2010	"Mama"	Vladimir Arzumanyan	Vladimir Arzumanyan, Avet Barseghyan	–	–	(Note: Represented Armenia in the Junior Eurovision Song Contest 2010. Won the contest with 120 points.)	
2011	"Bajanum Chi Linum" (Բաժանում չի լինում)	Ara Martirosyan	Ara Martirosyan, Avet Barseghyan	–	–	(Note: From the soundtrack of Armenian film Pesacun Krkesic.)	
2012	"PreGomesh" (ՊռեԳոմեշ)	Sirusho	Avet Barseghyan, Sirusho	–	–		
2014	"People of the Sun"	Betty	Betty, Avet Barseghyan, Mane Hakobyan	–	–	(Note: Represented Armenia in the Junior Eurovision Song Contest 2014. Placed 3rd with 146 points.)	
2015	"Aprelu April" (Ապրելու Ապրիլ)	Inga and Anush	Avet Barseghyan, Mane Hakobyan, Martin Mirzoyan	–	–		
2015	"Kga mi or" (Կգա մի օր)	Sirusho	Avet Barseghyan, Sirusho, Rama Duke, Elaine Staghikyan	–	–		
2015	"Love"	Michael Varosyan	Lilith Navasardyan, Michael Varosyan, Avet Barseghyan	–	–	(Note: Represented Armenia in the Junior Eurovision Song Contest 2015. Placed 2nd with 176 points.)	
2016	"Tarber" (Տարբեր)	Anahit and Mary	Nick Egibyan, Avet Barseghyan	–	–	(Note: Represented Armenia in the Junior Eurovision Song Contest 2016. Placed 2nd with 232 points.)	
2017	"Dashterov" (Դաշտերով)	Aram Mp3 and Iveta Mukuchyan	Avet Barseghyan, Aram Mp3, Serjo, Levon Navasardyan	–	–		
2017	"Fly With Me"	Artsvik	Lilith Navasardyan, Levon Navasardyan, Avet Barseghyan, David Tserunyan	–	–	(Note: Represented Armenia in the Eurovision Song Contest 2017. Placed 18th with 79 points.)	
2017	"Hayastan Jan" (Հայաստան ջան)	Iveta Mukuchyan	Avet Barseghyan, Iveta Mukuchyan	–	–		
2017	"Boomerang"	Misha	Avet Barseghyan, David Tserunyan, Artur Aghek, Vahram Petrosyan	–	–	(Note: Represented Armenia in the Junior Eurovision Song Contest 2017. Placed 6th with 148 points.)	
2018	"Janaparh" (Ճանապարհ)	Vardan Margaryan	Mane Hakobyan, Avet Barseghyan	–	–	(Note: Competed in Depi Mankakan Evratesil 2018. Placed 2nd with 26 points.)	
2019	"Colours of Your Dream"	Karina Ignatyan	Taras Demchuk, Avet Barseghyan, Margarita Doroshevish	–	–	(Note: Represented Armenia in the Junior Eurovision Song Contest 2019.)	

== Notes and references ==
=== References ===
Preceded by (Belarus) Leila Ismailava and Denis Kourian	Junior Eurovision Song Contest presenter 2011; With: Gohar Gasparyan	Succeeded by (Netherlands) Kim-Lian van der Meij and Ewout Genemans
