= The Path of Our Dream =

- Armenian: Մեր երազանքի ճանապարհը
- Directed by: Aram Shahbazyan; Arka Manukyan; Aren Malakyan; Edgar Baghdasaryan; Hrach Keshishyan; Arshaluys Harutyunyan; Mher Mkrtchyan
- Written by: E. Ayanyan; Edgar Baghdasaryan; Harutyun Ghukassian; Harutyun Harutyunyan; Harutyun Kbeyan; Aren Malakyan; Narek Margaryan; Mher Mkrtchyan
- Produced by: Arman Mitoyan; Karen Ghazaryan
- Cinematography: Vardges Manukyan
- Production company: Sharm Holding
- Release date: 19 December 2017
- Country: Armenia
- Language: Armenian

The Path of Our Dream (Armenian: Մեր երազանքի ճանապարհը) is an Armenian drama. The film premiered in the Armenian theaters on 19 December 2017. The film consists of 7 parts. Each part has its own storyline and director. Some parts of the movie are shot in Turkey and France. Edgar Baghdasaryan's film titled The Path of Simon won the main prize at the European festival of short films. The Moscow premiere of the film was on 6 February 2018.

== Cast ==
- Iveta Mukuchyan as Lilith
- Aram Mp3
- Sos Janibekyan
- Khoren Levonyan
- Ani Petrosyan
- Babken Chobanyan
- Misho
- Shant Hovhannisyan
- Lilit Varosyan
