= Dashterov (project) =

Music collaboration by Armenian musicians

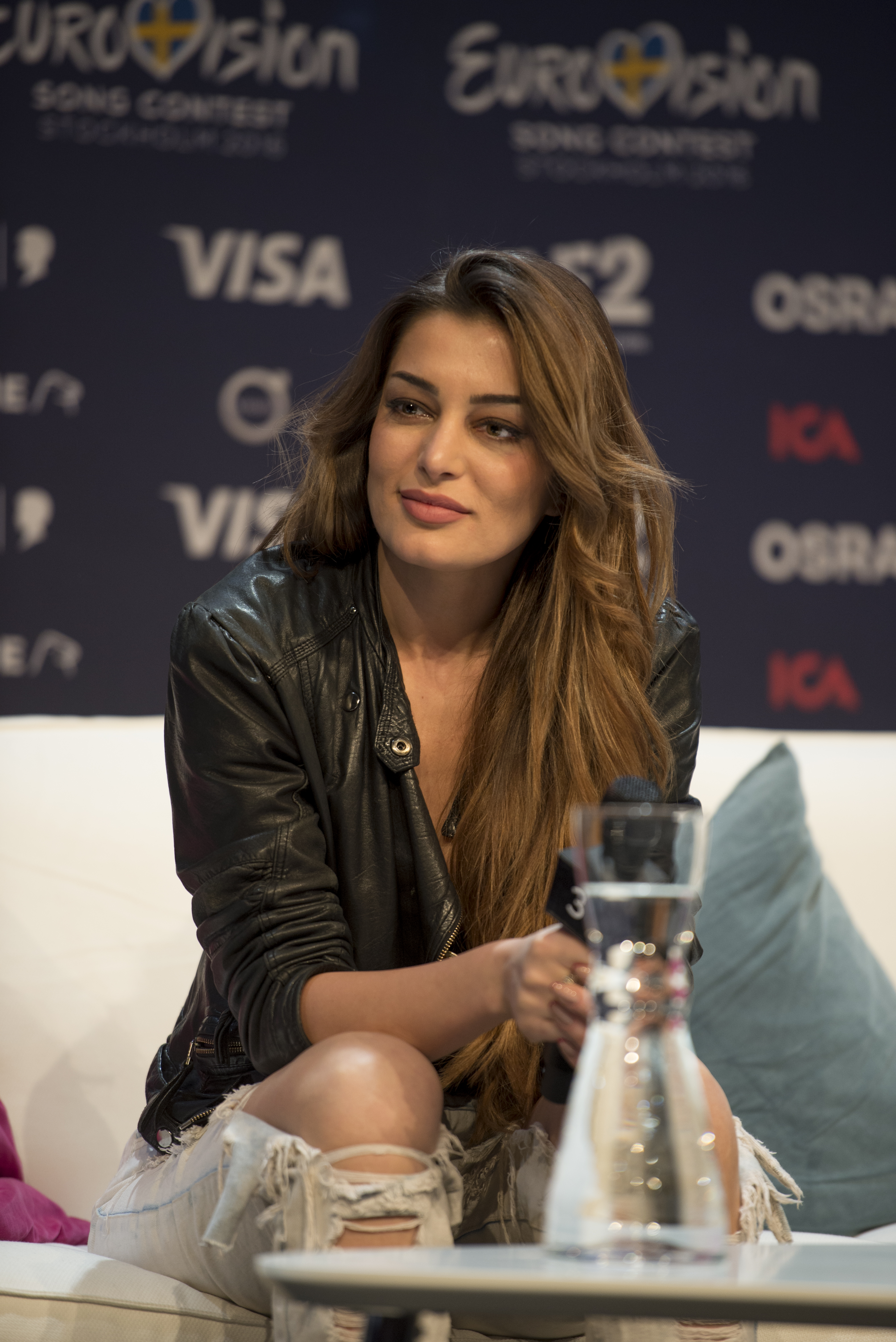
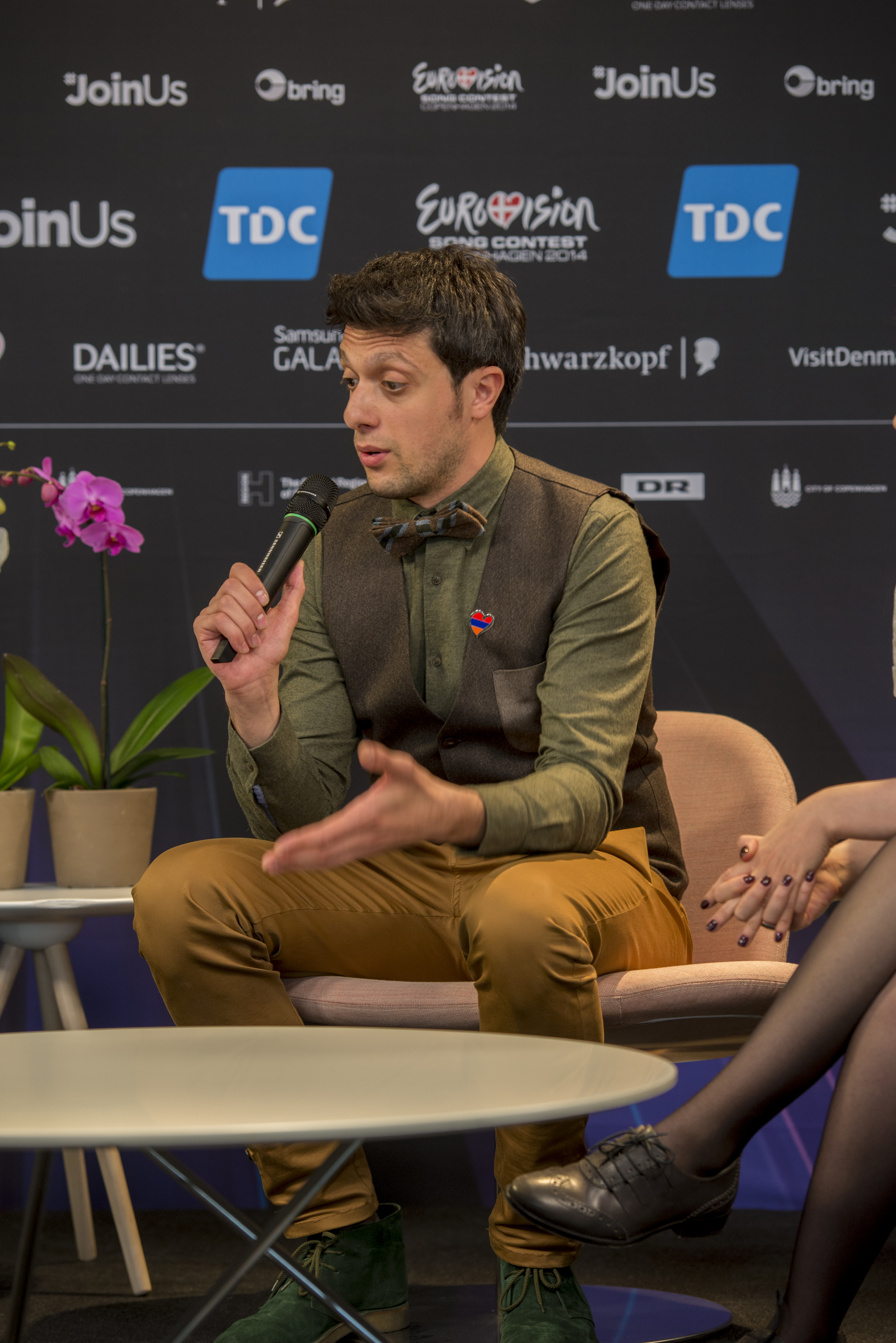
Iveta Mukuchyan (left) and Aram Mp3 (right)

Dashterov is a collaborative project by Armenian musicians Iveta Mukuchyan and Aram Sargsyan. Dashterov was awarded "Collaboration of the Year" at the Armenian Europe Music Awards. On 10 June 2017, the two artists presented their project at the Dalma Garden Mall. The project presents Armenian music in a modern version based on cultural values and historical roots. Dashterov introduces a mix of genres, highlighting Armenian folk and national music, presented in novel arrangements while reflecting their unique musical origin.

== Armenian Folk ==
Armenian Folk

Studio album by Iveta Mukuchyan
- Released: October 3, 2017
- Recorded: 2017
- Genres: Pop, Traditional Folk
- Label: Independent

Iveta Mukuchyan chronology
IvaVerse (2016)	Armenian Folk (2017)

On 3 October 2017, Iveta Mukuchyan released an album called Armenian Folk. It contains the songs of the Dashterov project, sung by Mukuchyan. The album consists of seven tracks. "Tsirani tsar", sung only by Sargsyan, is not included in the album. The songs on the album are sung entirely in Armenian.

=== Track listing ===
No.	Title	Length
1.	"Ալ Էղնիմ" (Al Eghnim)	4:50
2.	"Գորանի" (Gorani)	3:16
3.	"Հմայակ" (Hamayak)	3:31
4.	"Նազան" (Nazan)	3:11
5.	"Նինո" (Nino)	3:04
6.	"Քամին զանա" (Qamin Zana)	4:00
7.	"Ղափամա" (Ghapama)	2:39

== Awards ==
Year	Award	Category	City	Result	Ref.
2017	Armenian Europe Music Awards	Collaboration of the Year	Paris	Won	

== See also ==
- Dashterov
