= Dashterov =

Single by Aram Mp3 and Iveta Mukuchyan
- Language: Armenian
- English title: By fields
- Released: February 11, 2017
- Genre: pop
- Length: 4:10
- Label: AMPTV
- Songwriter(s): Avet Barseghyan
- Producer(s): Aram Mp3

Aram Mp3 singles chronology
"Asa" (2017)	"Dashterov" (2017)	"De Jpta" (2017)

Iveta Mukuchyan singles chronology
"Amena" (2017)	"Dashterov" (2017)	"De Jpta" (2017)

Music video
- "Dashterov" on YouTube

"Dashterov"
A 30-second sample of "Dashterov".

"Dashterov" (English: "By fields") is a song by Armenian musicians Aram Mp3 and Iveta Mukuchyan. The song premiered on February 11, 2017. The same day the singers sang the song at Dalma Garden Mall. The song is written by another Armenian musician Avet Barseghyan. Arrangements were made by Armenian DJ Serjo. Mukuchyan first talked about her collaboration in London during her interview with Wiwibloggs. The track sees the duo sing about chasing love across fields, valleys, mountains and canyons. The song preceded a collaborative project of the same name.

== Music video ==
Mukuchyan with the washboard

The official music video was directed by Aramayis Hayrapetyan and released on February 11, 2017. The music video features Iveta and Aram dressed in matching threads, feeling the beat. The quirky production comes packed with a cow, milk and folk with TVs as heads. Mukuchyan is seen picking up a washboard and getting to work.

== Credits and personnel ==
Credits adapted from YouTube.

- Aram Mp3 – production, vocals
- Iveta Mukuchyan – vocals
- Serjo – composition
- Levon Navasardyan – composition
- Karen Melkumyan - editing
- Aramayis Hayrapetyan - director
- Albert Grigoryan - production designer
- Diana Shatverian - costume designer

== Awards ==
Year	Award	Category	City	Result	Ref.
2017	Sochi Awards	The Song of The Year	Sochi	Won	

== See also ==
- Armenian Folk
