= Evening Azoyan =

- Poster
- Երեկոյան Ազոյան
- Genre: talk show
- Directed by: Levon Bartikyan
- Creative director: Arman Sargsyan
- Presented by: Hovhannes Azoyan; Mher Khachtryan
- Country of origin: Armenia
- Original language: Armenian
- No. of seasons: 1
- No. of episodes: 3

Production
- Editor: Vazgen Ghazaryan
- Running time: 39-42 minutes
- Production company: PanArmenian

Original release
- Network: Armenia TV
- Release: March 26, 2018 – 2018

Evening Azoyan (Armenian: Երեկոյան Ազոյան, Yerekoyan Azoyan) is a late night talk show hosted by Hovhannes Azoyan and Mher Khachatryan. The series premiered on Armenia TV on March 26, 2018. The series aired on Saturdays at 9 pm. It was generally structured around humorous monologues about the day's news, guest interviews, comedy sketches and music performances. Special guests played games and participate in competitions that varied by their courage. Guests of the show included Iveta Mukuchyan, Arame, Levon Harutyunyan, Grisha Aghakhanyan, Ashot Ghazaryan, Vache Tovmasyan and Anna Grigoryan.
