= Nazeni Hovhannisyan =

Armenian television presenter (born 1982)

- Նազենի Հովհաննիսյան
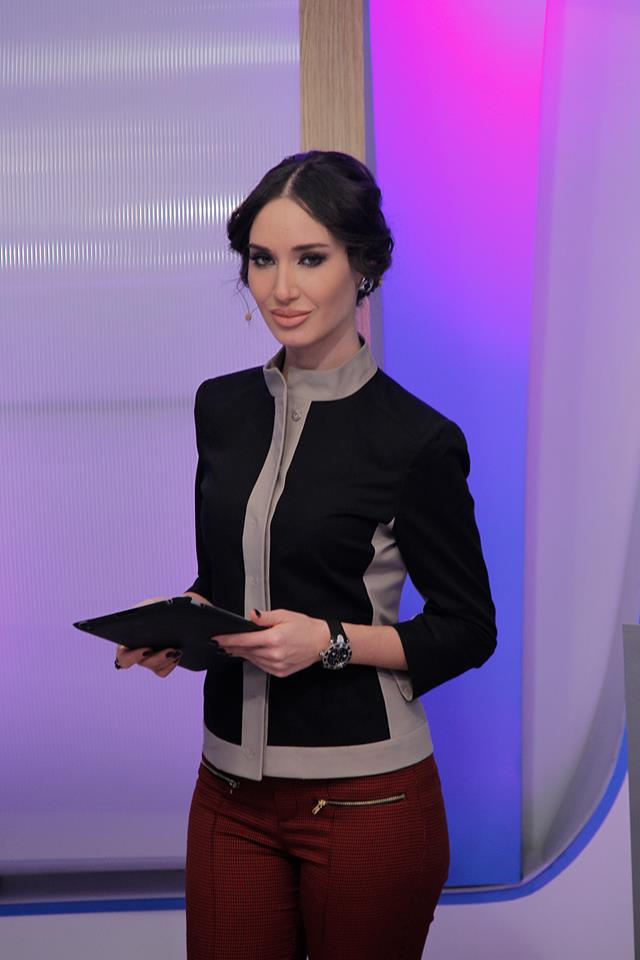
- Born: July 18, 1982 (age 42); Yerevan, Armenian SSR, Soviet Union
- Citizenship: Armenian
- Occupation(s): Actress, presenter, lecturer
- Years active: 2001–present
- Website: nazenihovhannisyan.com

Nazeni Garniki Hovhannisyan (Armenian: Նազենի Գառնիկի Հովհաննիսյան, born July 18, 1982) is an Armenian actress, presenter and lecturer at the Yerevan State Institute of Theatre and Cinematography.

== Selected filmography ==
Nazeni Hovhannisyan has appeared in the following movies:

- Ոչինչ չի մնա/Vochinch Chi Mna (2007)
- Երեք Ընկեր/Ereq Ynker (2008)
- Տաքսի Էլի Լավ ա/Taxi Eli Lav A (2009)
- Սպանված Աղավնի/Spanvac Aghavni (2009–2010)
- The Diary of the Cross Stealer (2010–2011)
- Ala Bala Nica (2011)
- Գարեգին Նժդեհ/Garegin Nzhdeh (2013)
- Անհայտ Բաժանորդ/Anhayt Bajanord (2019)
- Երջանկության Մեխանիկա/Erjankutyan Mekhanika (2021)
- Հոթել Գրանդ 3/ Hotel Grand 3 (2023)

== Awards and nominations ==
Year	Organization	Award	Recipient	Result
2014	LUXURY award	The Best Presenter	Herself	Won
