= Marianna Mukuchyan =

Armenian make-up artist

- Born: 1984 (age 40–41); Yerevan, Armenian SSR, USSR
- Occupation: Make-up artist
- Years active: 2012–present
- Relatives: Iveta Mukuchyan (sister)

Marianna Mukuchyan (Armenian: Մարիաննա Մուկուչյան, Armenian pronunciation: [maˈɹianŋa mukuˈtʃʰjɑn]; born 1984) is an Armenian make-up artist.

== Early life ==
Marianna Mukuchyan was born in Yerevan, Armenia (then part of the Soviet Union) in 1984. Her family moved to Germany in 1992. Mukuchyan was schooled in Germany and has a master's degree in textile engineering. Her sister, Iveta Mukuchyan, is a prominent singer-songwriter in Armenia.

== Career ==
Marianna started her career doing stage makeup for fellows for shows and events like Tschibo, STILL, OTTO and Bambi Awards in Germany. She gained her first international publication for a New York fashion magazine called Zink. Mukuchyan also attained fame by working on hair and make up for Damiani fashion show in collaboration with John Galliano. In 2013, the artist has also lived in United Arab Emirates, where she was shot for fashion magazines like Emirates Woman, Rolling Stones and fashion brands like Juicy Couture, Dolce & Gabbana. In the same year, she permanently resided in Mumbai, India, where she worked with magazines like Vogue India, Harper's Bazaar, Elle, Verve, Cosmopolitan and India's biggest print and TV campaigns like Westside, Globus, Maybelline, Kaya, Lifestyle, Lodha, TBZ Jewellers, Kingfisher Calendar, Bajaj hair oil, Raymonds, Pantene, Nivea, Sabyasachi, Anita Dongre, Streax, L'Oréal. She became one of India's most appreciated celebrity hair and make up artist and started to work for Bollywood. She has worked with many prominent Indian actresses such as Aishwarya Rai, Priyanka Chopra and Parineeti Chopra. On 11 November 2017, Marianna and her sister launched their new "Mukuchyan" brand in MADE shopping center in Yerevan, Armenia.

Music video
Year	Title	Artist
2018	Rich Bitch ("The Journey of a Woman" part 2)	Iveta Mukuchyan

== Personal life ==
=== Relationships ===
In 2017, there were news that Indian actor Aditya Roy Kapur and Mukuchyan were dating after they were spotted together in some ceremonies. However, it was later confirmed that they are not in a relationship.

== See also ==
- Armenians in Germany
