= LoveWave =

Song by Iveta Mukuchyan

Single by Iveta Mukuchyan
- Released: 30 March 2016
- Recorded: 2016
- Genre: Pop
- Length: 2:58
- Label: AMPTV; Universal Music Denmark
- Songwriter(s): Iveta Mukuchyan; Stephanie Crutchfield; Lilith Navasardyan; Levon Navasardyan

Iveta Mukuchyan singles chronology
"Ari Yar" (2015)	"LoveWave" (2016)	"Amena" (2016)

Eurovision Song Contest 2016 entry
- Country: Armenia
- Artist(s): Iveta Mukuchyan
- Language: English
- Composer(s): Lilith Navasardyan, Levon Navasardyan
- Lyricist(s): Iveta Mukuchyan, Stephanie Crutchfield

Finals performance
- Semi-final result: 2nd
- Semi-final points: 243
- Final result: 7th
- Final points: 249

Entry chronology
- ◄ "Face the Shadow" (2015)
- "Fly with Me" (2017) ►

"LoveWave" is a song by Armenian singer Iveta Mukuchyan. Premiered on March 2, 2016, it was released as a single on March 30, 2016. It represented Armenia in the Eurovision Song Contest 2016. "LoveWave" was written by Mukuchyan, Stephanie Crutchfield, Lilith Navasardyan and Levon Navasardyan. To promote the song, an accompanying music video was released and co-stars Mukuchyan and Swedish model Ben Dahlhaus.

== Background and release ==
I wanted to sing about a feeling we all know and crave for. A feeling that creates and destroys, empowers and weakens, rips and completes. A feeling out of space and time, that is unpredictable as an ocean and powerful as a wave. A feeling that is worth fighting for. Love.

—Mukuchyan on "LoveWave".

On October 13, 2015, the Public Television of Armenia announced Mukuchyan as the Armenian representative at the Eurovision Song Contest 2016 in Stockholm, Sweden. On the same day, they also announced an open contest for songwriters from all over the world. On December 31, 2015, the official YouTube channel of Eurovision uploaded a video, where Mukuchyan said: "We received songs from Canada, the United States, Sweden, Armenia, Germany - almost everywhere. We had amazing songs and it was really hard to decide which one to choose. I want to thank all the composers and producers." In the video she also revealed that they have chosen the song, stating: "The one we chose touched me deep inside my heart. I didn't even know that a song could touch me like that."

On February 19, 2016, the song's title and the release date were announced. The lyrics of "LoveWave" is written by Mukuchyan and Stephanie Crutchfield, while it was composed by Lilith Navasardyan and Levon Navasardyan. On March 2, 2016, the song was premiered by the Public Television of Armenia, and was uploaded to Eurovision's YouTube channel. On March 30, 2016, the song was released for digital download on iTunes as a single. An official remix of "LoveWave" by Rhannes premiered on May 4, 2016.

== Music video ==
The music video for "LoveWave" was separately shot in Germany and Armenia, and features Mukuchyan and Swedish model Ben Dahlhaus, who lives in Germany and is known for his work with famous fashion brands. It is the production of the Public Television of Armenia and Germany's Black Sheep communications. On February 19, 2016, an 18-second teaser of the video was uploaded to Mukuchyan's YouTube channel. The video for "LoveWave" premiered on March 2, 2016. On March 25, 2016, an official lyric video of the song was uploaded to Mukuchyan's YouTube channel.

== Eurovision Song Contest ==
On 25 January 2016, a special allocation draw was held which placed each country into one of the two semi-finals, as well as which half of the show they would perform in. Armenia was placed into the first semi-final, to be held on 10 May 2016, and was scheduled to perform in the first half of the show. Mukuchyan performed "LoveWave" in position 7, following the entry from the Netherlands and before the entry from San Marino. The song qualified from the first semi-final and competed in the final on May 14, 2016, where she performed the song last in position 26, following the entry from United Kingdom. The song finished in 7th place with 249 points.

== Charts ==
Chart (2016)	Peak position
Sweden Heatseekers (Sverigetopplistan)	13

== Awards and nominations ==
Year	Awards	Category	Result
2017	Swallow Music Awards	Hit of the Year	Won
