= Iveta Mukuchyan =

Armenian singer (born 1986)

- Իվետա Մուկուչյան
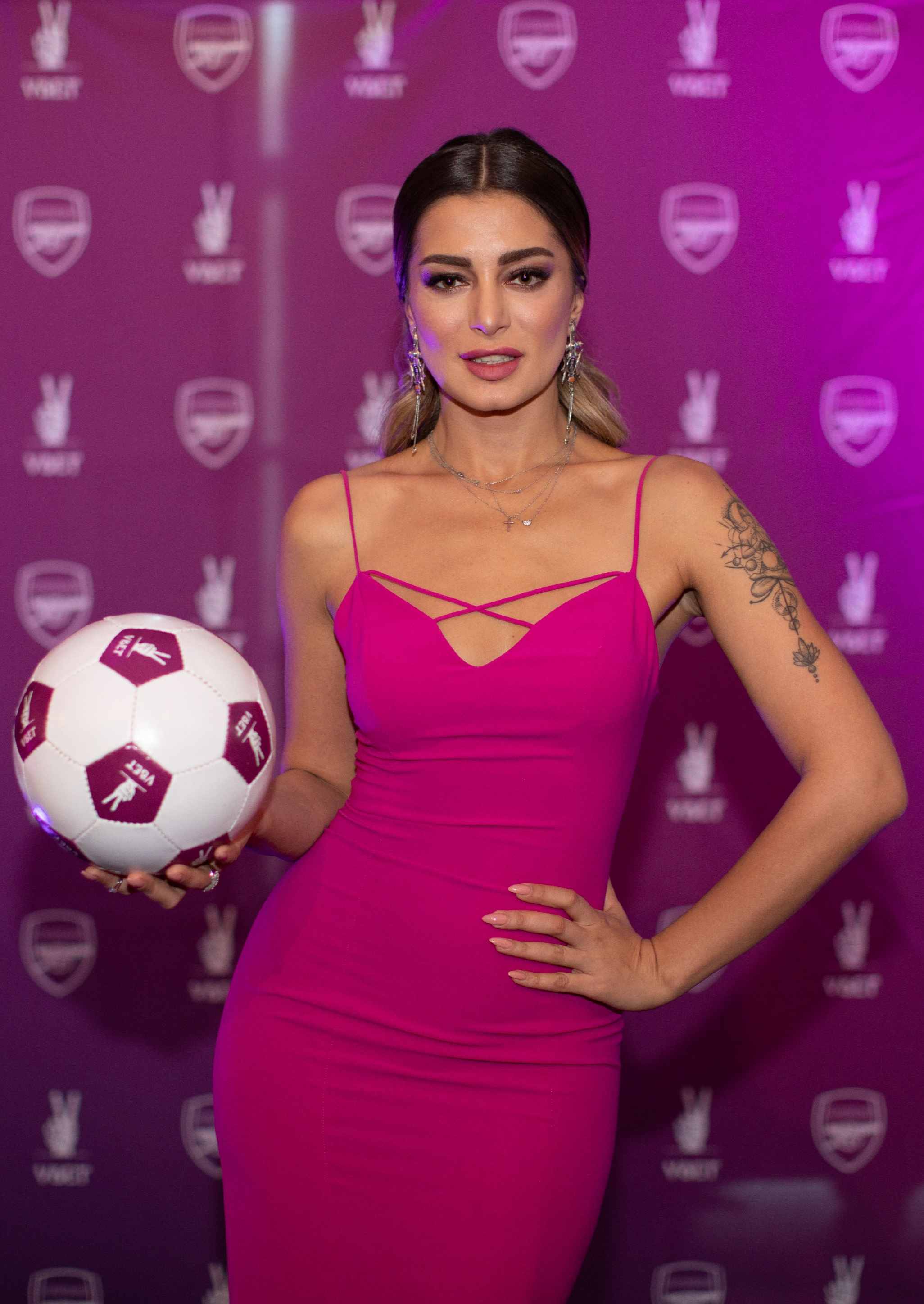
- Mukuchyan in 2019
- Born: 14 October 1986 (age 39); Yerevan, Armenian SSR, USSR
- Occupation: Singer
- Years active: 2009–present
- Relatives: Marianna Mukuchyan (sister)
- Musical career
- Genres: Pop; R&B; Folk
- Instrument: Vocals
- Labels: Sister Jack; Mukuchyan
- Website: www.ivetamukuchyan.com

Iveta Roberti Mukuchyan (Armenian: Իվետա Ռոբերտի Մուկուչյան, pronounced [ivɛˈtɑ mukuˈtʃʰjɑn]; born 14 October 1986) is an Armenian singer. Born in Yerevan, she moved to Hamburg, Germany, in 1992. Mukuchyan returned to Armenia in 2009 and placed fifth in the fourth season of the talent competition Hay Superstar. During this time, she received vocal training at the Yerevan Komitas State Conservatory. Mukuchyan also participated for season two of The Voice of Germany in 2012.

She represented Armenia at the Eurovision Song Contest 2016 with the song "LoveWave", finishing seventh in the final. Mukuchyan made her acting debut in the comedy movie Run Away Or Get Married that year, and released her debut extended play, IvaVerse. In autumn 2016, Mukuchyan was a jury member on the first season of Depi Evratesil, a television series selecting the Armenian entrant for the Eurovision Song Contest 2017.

Mukuchyan and Aram Mp3 released "Dashterov", which won a Song of the Year Award, in 2017. The song preceded a collaborative project of the same name, which received the Collaboration of the Year award at the Armenian Europe Music Awards. Mukuchyan released Armenian Folk, a solo version of Dashterov Project, on 3 October 2017. That year, she starred in the film The Path of Our Dream. At the 2018 Swallow Music Awards, Mukuchyan won the title of Best Female Singer of the Year. In 2020, she was honored at the Distinctive International Arab Festivals Awards (DIAFA) in Dubai, UAE. In December 2022, she hosted the Junior Eurovision Song Contest 2022 in Yerevan.

== Early life ==
Iveta Mukuchyan was born on 14 October 1986 in Yerevan, Armenian Soviet Socialist Republic, to Ruben Mukuchyan and Susanna Ambaryan. Her mother worked in a tourist information center when her husband went to Germany to buy a car. However, he stayed in Germany due to unforeseen circumstances, therefore, Mukuchyan's mother decided to move the rest of the family to Germany in 1992. In 1995, the family returned to Armenia, however, they moved back to Germany because of the horrible conditions at the time. She attended the Catholic Sankt-Ansgar-Schule in Hamburg from 1998 to 2006 while working part-time as a waitress in a café. Mukuchyan described her father as a patriot and a strict man who demanded she only speak Armenian at home and marry an Armenian man. While in Hamburg, Mukuchyan joined a music club and sang Celine Dion's "My Heart Will Go On" at a ceremony. Following the performance, her parents believed that she should become a singer. She studied at the Yerevan Komitas State Conservatory leaving her design studies, begun in Germany, unfinished. Her sister, Marianna, is a stylist.

== Career ==
=== 2009–2014: Hay Superstar and The Voice of Germany ===
In 2009, Mukuchyan auditioned for season four of the talent competition Hay Superstar (the Armenian version of Pop Idol), where she finished fifth. She received the Discovery of the Year award at the Armenia Awards in Moscow, and appeared in the French-language track "L'amour n'a pas de loi" on Armenian rapper Ararat 93's debut studio album Amalgame (2010). Mukuchyan appeared the following year on Parahandes, where she was eliminated before the semifinals. That year, she placed third in the German song contest The Voice of Hamburg. Mukuchyan appeared on several Armenian talk shows, including Pop Encyclopedia, Let's Begin Freshly, The Century's Night and Found Dream, and was on the cover of El Style magazine. She participated in season two of The Voice of Germany in 2012 (performing Loreen's "Euphoria" during her audition), and Xavier Naidoo chose her as part of his team. Mukuchyan was the winning contestant from Naidoo's team in the second phase of the contest, where the participants sang "Many Rivers to Cross". In December 2012, El Style named her the "Sexiest Armenian" and featured her on its cover.

=== 2015–2016: Eurovision Song Contest ===
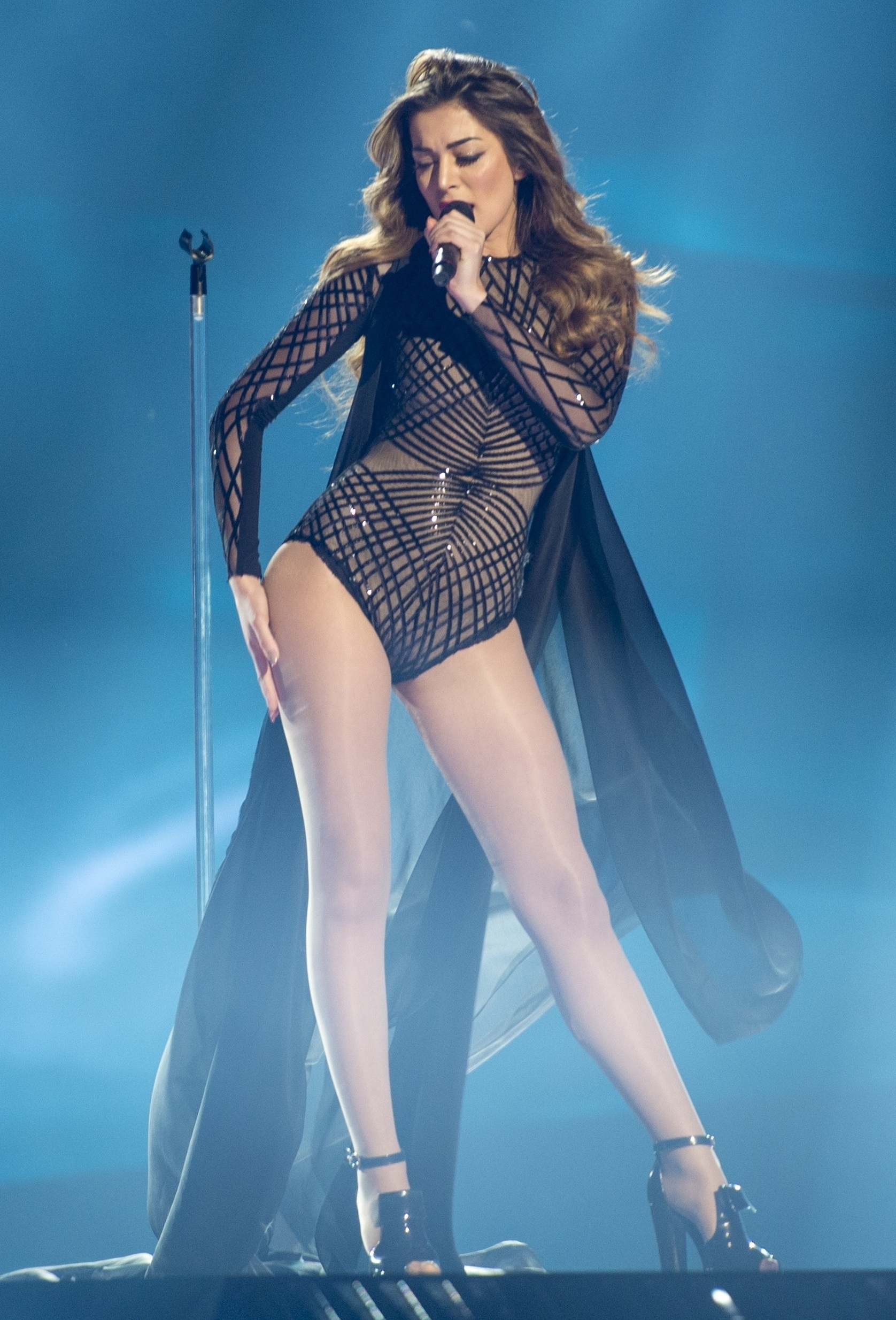
Mukuchyan performing "LoveWave" during a Eurovision rehearsal

Mukuchyan released the single "Simple Like a Flower" with a music video in October 2015. The same month, Armenian Public Television announced that the singer would represent Armenia at the Eurovision Song Contest 2016 in Stockholm. "LoveWave", written by Lilith and Levon Navasardyan with lyrics by Mukuchyan and Stephanie Crutchfield, was chosen as the Armenian entry in February 2016. Mukuchyan premiered the song and a music video in March 2016, and appeared again on the cover of El Style. During the Eurovision season, Mukuchyan and her team were constantly providing information via Eurovision Diary, an AMPTV program specifically designed for Armenian Eurovision entrants. On 3 April 2016, she promoted "LoveWave" as the Armenian Eurovision entry at the Eurovision Pre-Party concert in Moscow. However, she changed some of the song's lyrics because of the then ongoing Artsakh clashes. The singer cancelled her participation at the 9 April Eurovision in Concert event to protest the clashes.

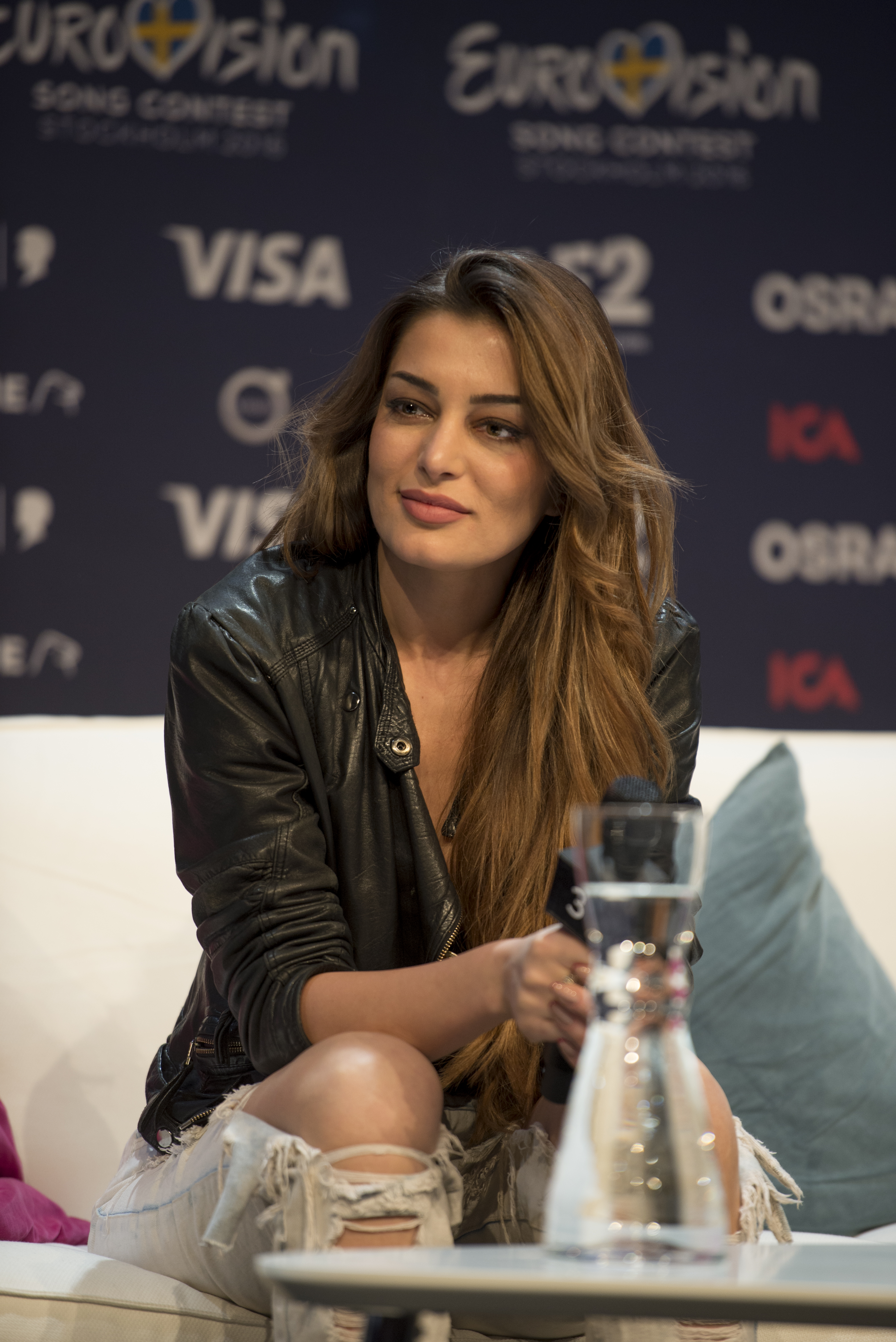
Mukuchyan during a Eurovision press conference

Mukuchyan was seen holding the flag of the disputed Republic of Artsakh during the first Eurovision semifinal in May 2016, sparking controversy and a backlash from the Azerbaijani press. The European Broadcasting Union (EBU) released a statement the following day, calling the incident a "serious breach" of its ban on political messages and saying that Armenia's public broadcaster would face sanctions: "Any further breach of the rules of the 2016 Eurovision Song Contest could lead to disqualification from this year's event or any successive editions." In response, Mukuchyan said that "[her] thoughts are with [her] Motherland. I want ... peace everywhere." An airplane appeared near the Ericsson Globe in Stockholm on the day of the Eurovision final with the message, "Karabach loves Iveta". "LoveWave" finished seventh at the Eurovision, with 249 points. The singer also won the titles of Eurovision's Next Top Model and Best Female Solo Vocalist of Eurovision 2016. In addition to her musical career, she starred with Mkrtich Arzumanyan in the adventure-comedy film Run Away or Get Married (2016) and recorded the soundtrack of the movie.

=== 2016–2017: IvaVerse and Dashterov ===
After Eurovision, Mukuchyan guest-starred on a number of Armenian television shows. In June 2016, the Mukuchyan sisters attended Sónar, a three-day summer electronic music festival in Barcelona. Mukuchyan was guest singer at the July 2016 Armenian Street Festival in London where she performed with duduk player Gevorg Karapetyan. In September, she performed a solo concert for the launch of Armenian Evocabank's advertising campaign. She was named Armenia's entertainment ambassador at the 19 November 2016 Pan Armenian Entertainment Awards at the Microsoft Theater in Los Angeles, where she performed "LoveWave" and a new single, "Amena". "Amena", which Mukuchyan said is a song about women and their transformation, inner struggles and values, was released five days later. Its music video, produced by Mukuchyan, was released in April 2017. She was a jury member on the first season of Depi Evratesil, a television series selecting the Armenian entrant for the Eurovision Song Contest 2017. Her final act, Vahe Aleksanyan, finished fifth in the contest with 48 points.

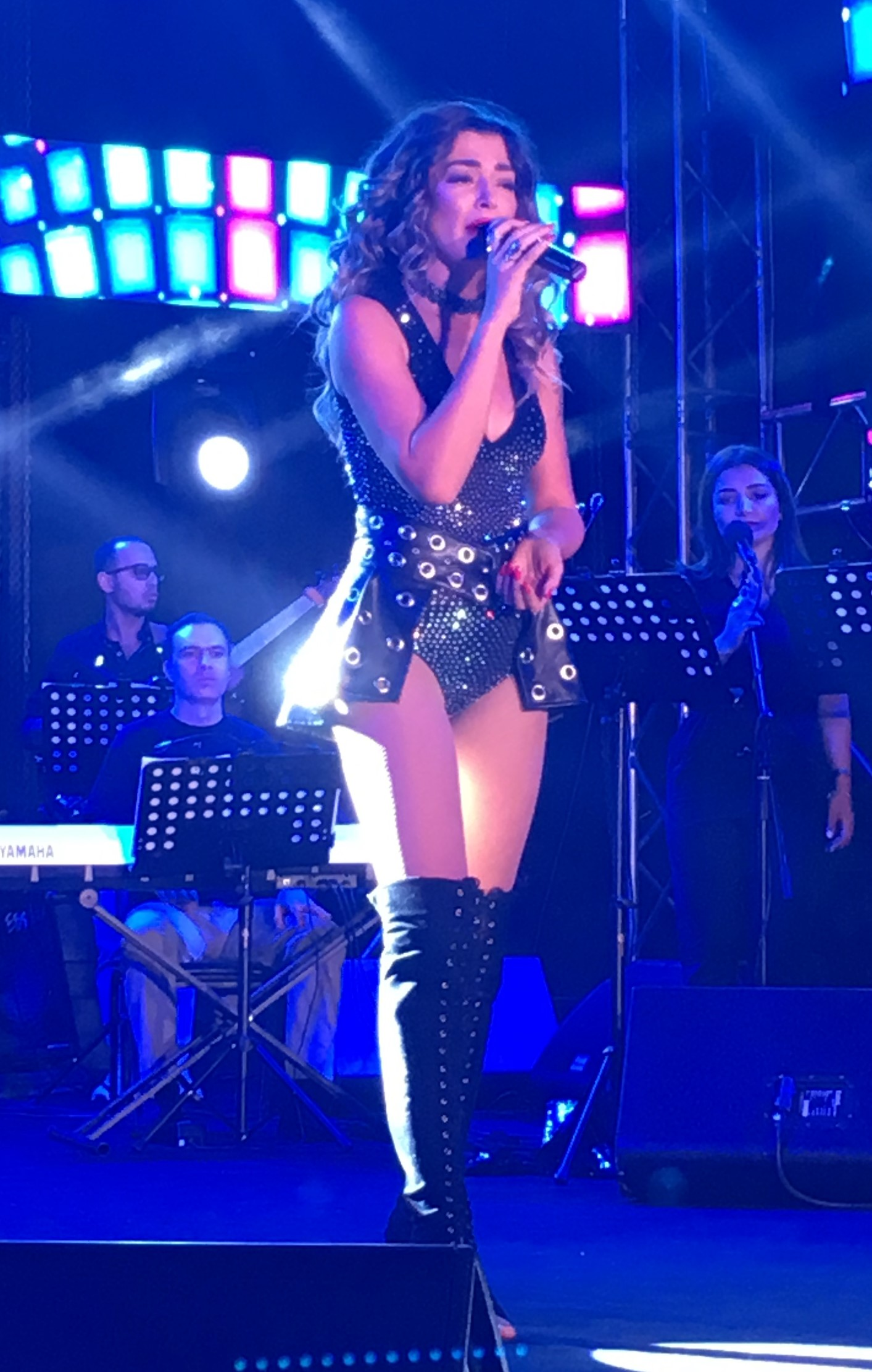
Mukuchyan at an open-air concert in 2017

Mukuchyan released her debut extended play, IvaVerse (a mix of styles, including funk and R&B), on 25 December 2016 and promoted it at the Dalma Garden Mall. She had a photo shoot with the Armenian magazine Oriflame in January 2017, and appeared on its cover. Mukuchyan and Aram Mp3 released a single entitled "Dashterov" the following month, which received a Song of the Year award at Armenia TV's awards of the same name. She was the Armenian spokesperson at the Eurovision 2017 finale in May, and was a special guest on the musical TV talk show Benefis. Mukuchyan also announced Dashterov, a traditional-music project with Aram Mp3, based on the single of the same name in May. It received a Best Collaboration of the Year award at the Armenian Europe Music Awards, where Mukuchyan was recognized as the Diva of Armenian Pop. On 21 June, she announced on her Facebook page a new song and music video ("Hayastan Jan"), which premiered five days later. That month, Mukuchyan and other well-known Armenian singers released a single entitled "De Jpta" to benefit children with cancer.

She appeared in the 2017 film The Path of Our Dream along with Mher Mkrchyan and Arka Manukyan. Mukuchyan performed her single, "Depi Nor Irakanutyun", at the Miss Armenia beauty pageant on 24 September. She released its music video on her YouTube channel the following day, and the song's title became Evocabank's slogan. In October, Mukuchyan received three nominations at Germany's Daf Bama Music Awards. Her debut solo album, Armenian Folk (with the Dashterov Project songs), was released that month. Mukuchyan was a special guest on The Voice of Armenia on 13 October, when she sang Naughty Boy's "Running". She performed at the 26 October New Body Awards (sponsored by McFit) at the Tempodrom in Berlin. On 11 November, Mukuchyan and her sister launched their Mukuchyan brand at the MADE shopping center.

=== 2018–present ===
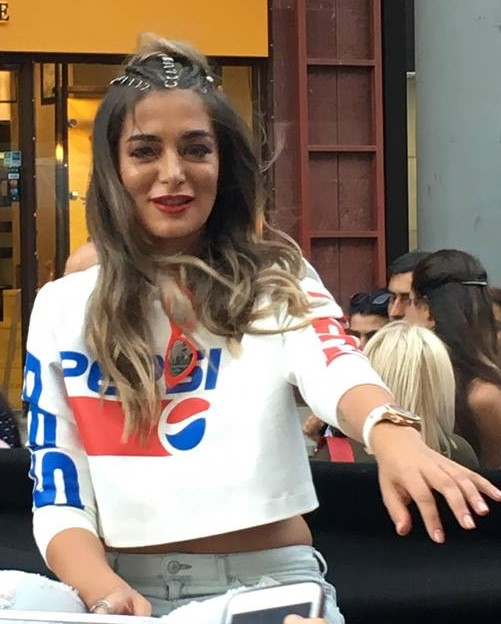
Mukuchyan in 2018

In January 2018, Mukuchyan was one of the international jury members of Eurovision Song CZ and Destination Eurovision; national finals to select the French and the Czech Republic's entries for the 2018 Eurovision Song Contest. In the same month, she announced a new song, which premiered on 1 February titled "Siraharvel Em Qez". Three days later the song was released for digital download on iTunes as a single. In February, the singer undertook a major musical project in South Africa, which was later revealed to be named "The Journey of a Woman". Throughout the year, Mukuchyan had solo concerts at the Moe's on the 5th restaurant in Dubai on 15 March, 19 April and 5 May. She also performed at the 2018 Swallow Music Awards on 31 March and won one of the major awards, the Best Female Singer of the Year. On 1 April, she gave a concert with her band at the KAMI Music Club, where she sang songs by the Dashterov project and her latest singles. On Motherhood and Beauty Day, the singer was the special guest of the RIO Mall card presentation and appeared on a comedy show Evening Azoyan with Arame.

During the 2018 Armenian protests, Mukuchyan supported the anti-government protesters on both days of the Prime Ministerial election; she performed "Hayastan Jan" at the Republic Square, Yerevan. The singer, along with SONA and Ara Martirosyan, gave a concert at the Aram Khachaturian Grand Concert Hall on 31 May 2018. On Europe Day, the singer performed an open-air concert at Northern Avenue, Yerevan. In the summer, Mukuchyan released a collaboration with record producer Narek Mets Hayq, "Mets Khagh", which also features Roland Gasparyan and Hayk Karapetyan. In October 2018, the first and the second parts of her South African project were released with the names "Margo" and "Rich Bitch" respectively. On 29 and 30 October Mukuchyan and some other Armenian singers had a tribute concert "For You, Aznavour" dedicated to French-Armenian singer Charles Aznavour. Following the concerts, the singer released the Armenian version of Aznavour song "Quand Tu M'Aimes" (When You Love Me). On 17 November 2018, Mukuchyan premiered a new song titled "Hayastani Axjikner" (Armenian Girls) during an Armenian comedy-show Women's Club. The next day, Mukuchyan organized a showcase for the music video of the song in "The Alexander" hotel, Yerevan and called the music video "feministic".

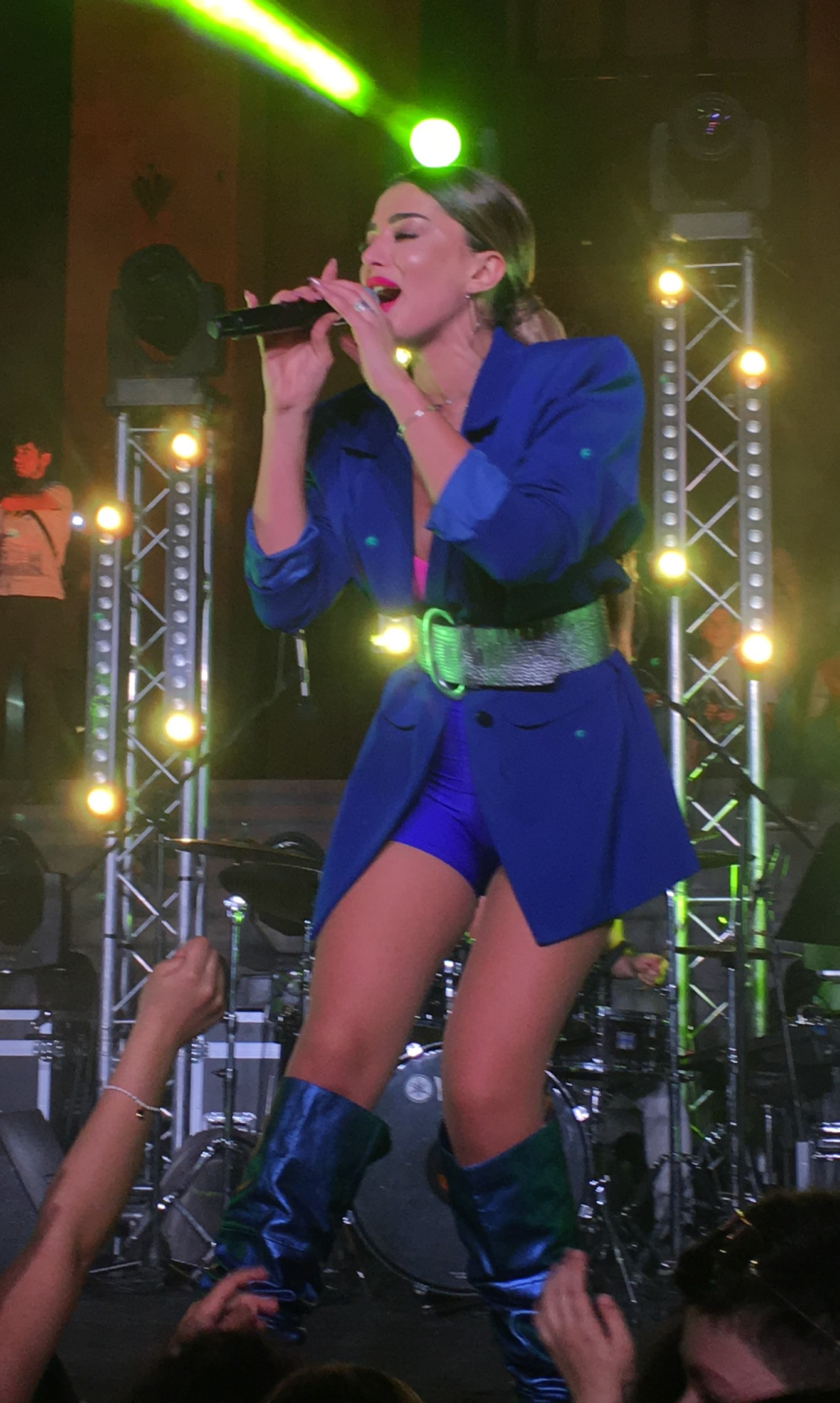
Mukuchyan performing in May 2019

On International Women's Day, Mukuchyan had her first concert at Belasco Theatre in Los Angeles, California. To promote the concert, the singer appeared in a number of Armenian TV-programs airing in the United States. On 28 April 2019, she released the third and final part of the trilogy "The Journey Of A Woman" called "United". Mukuchyan performed her single "Hayastani Axjikner" at the Miss Armenia beauty pageant on 11 May 2019. A few days later, Mukuchyan performed an open-air concert dedicated to the 100th anniversary of Yerevan State University.

In October 2020, amid the Nagorno-Karabakh war, Mukuchyan hosted an online musical event titled Rock for Artsakh featuring Armenian and foreign artists to raise awareness and funds for Artsakh. She also urged her fans and friends to donate to help the families of soldiers who died in the war instead of buying gifts for her 34th birthday. In early November, she was featured on a charity single for Artsakh titled "Mez Vochinch Chi Haghti" (Nothing Will Win Us) along with Arthur Khachents, Srbuk, Gor Sujyan, Sevak Amroyan, Sevak Khanagyan and Sona Rubenyan, produced by DerHova. Shortly after the end of the war, Mukuchyan visitied Kalbajar District to film a reportage in German, talking to local Armenians who burnt their homes to prevent them being reinhabited by Azerbaijanis ahead of the transfer of the province from Artsakh to Azerbaijan. In her reportage, she also showed the ancient Armenian heritage of the district and performed a song in the Dadivank monastery. In the same month, Mukuchyan performed the single "Nevagivup" (English version of "1% Ser") and received an award at the 2020 Distinctive International Arab Festivals Awards (DIAFA) in Dubai, which she dedicated to the Armenian soldiers and her friends, who lost their lives in the war. During her acceptance speech she condemned Azerbaijan and Turkey and called on international community's attention to the inhuman treatment of the Armenian prisoners of war in Azerbaijan.

In 2021, Mukuchyan became one of the jury members of AMPTV's The Masked Singer. In December 2022, she hosted the 20th edition of Junior Eurovision Song Contest along with Garik Papoyan and Karina Ignatyan in Yerevan, Armenia.

== Discography ==
=== Albums ===
Title	Album details
Armenian Folk	Released: 3 October 2017; Label: Self-released; Format: Digital download

=== Extended plays ===
Title	Album details
IvaVerse	Released: 25 December 2016; Label: Sister Jack; Format: Digital download

=== Singles ===
==== As lead artist ====
List of singles as lead artist, with selected chart positions, showing year released and album name
Title	Year	Peak chart positions	Album
Title	Year	SWE Heat.	Album
"Right Way to Love"	2011	—N/a	Non-album singles
"Ari Yar"	2015	—N/a	Non-album singles
"Simple like a Flower"	2015	—N/a	IvaVerse
"LoveWave"	2016	13	Non-album singles
"Amena"	2016	—N/a	Non-album singles
"De Jpta" (with Aram Mp3, Mihran Tsarukyan, Anahit Shahbazyan, Roland Gasparyan, Erik, Christine Pepelyan, Yana Hovhannisyan and Mkrtich Arzumanyan)	2017	—N/a	Non-album singles
"Hayastan Jan"	2017	—N/a	Non-album singles
"Depi Nor Irakanutyun"	2017	—N/a	Non-album singles
"Dashterov" (with Aram Mp3)	2017	—N/a	Non-album singles
"Siraharvelem Qez"	2018	—N/a	Non-album singles
"Hayastani Axjikner"	2018	—N/a	Non-album singles
"Stver" (featuring 33.3)	2019	—N/a	Non-album singles
"Hayastan"	2019	—N/a	Non-album singles
"Im Anush Hayastan"	2019	—N/a	Non-album singles
"Bambasanq"	2020	—N/a	Non-album singles
"1% Ser (Nevagivup)"	2020	—N/a	Non-album singles
"Mez Vochinch Chi Haghti" (with Arthur Khachents, Gor Sujyan, Srbuk, Sevak Amroyan, Sevak Khanagyan and Sona Rubenyan)	2020	—N/a	Non-album singles

==== As featured artist ====
List of singles as featured artist, showing year released and album name
Title	Year	Album
"Freak" (Lazzaro featuring Iveta Mukuchyan)	2013	Non-album singles
"Summer Rain" (Lazzaro featuring Iveta Mukuchyan)	2014	Non-album singles
"I'm Falling" (Serjo featuring Iveta Mukuchyan)	2014	Non-album singles
"Mets Khagh" (Narek Mets featuring Iveta Mukuchyan, Roland Gasparyan and Hayk Karoyi Karapetyan)	2018	Non-album singles
"Polu Ya" (Ara Martirosyan featuring Iveta Mukuchyan)	2020	Non-album singles

== Filmography ==
=== Films ===
Title	Year	Role
Run Away or Get Married	2016	Sathenik
The Path of Our Dream	2017	Lilith

=== Television ===
Title	Year	Notes
Eurovision Diary	2015–16; 2018	2015–16 Lead role 2018 Special guest
Ola Proti Fora	2016	Greek show; Special guest
ArmComedy	2016	Guest
Depi Evratesil	2016–17	Judge/Mentor
ESC-Songcheck 2017	2017	Reviewer on entries competing in the Eurovision Song Contest 2017
Benefis	2017	Episode: "Aram Mp3", "Iveta Mukuchyan"
Melodifestivalen 2017	2017	International jury spokesperson
Hayastan Jan	2017	Contestant
The Voice of Armenia	2017	Special guest
Destination Eurovision	2018	International jury member
Evening Azoyan	2018	Special guest
Women's Club	2018	Special guest; Episode 6

== Awards and nominations ==
Year	Award	Category	Recipient	City	Result	Ref.
2010	Armenia Music Awards	Discovery of the Year	Herself	Moscow	Won	
2016	Pan Armenian Entertainment Awards	Armenia's Entertainment Ambassador	Herself	Los Angeles	Won	
2017	Swallow Music Awards	Hit of the Year	"LoveWave"	Yerevan	Won	
2017	Armenian Europe Music Awards	Collaboration of the Year	Dashterov Project	Paris	Won	
2017	Armenian Europe Music Awards	Diva of Armenian Pop	Herself	Paris	Won	
2017	Song of the Year Awards	Song of the Year	"Dashterov"	Sochi	Won	
2017	Daf Bama Music Awards	BAMA's Best Performer	Herself	Hamburg	Nominated	
2017	Daf Bama Music Awards	Best Armenian Act	Herself	Hamburg	Nominated	
2017	Daf Bama Music Awards	BAMA People's Choice Award	Herself	Hamburg	Nominated	
2018	Swallow Music Awards	Best Female Singer of the Year	Herself	Yerevan	Won	
2018	Kamoblog Night Life Awards	Event Person of the Year	Herself	Yerevan	Won	
2018	Song of the Year Awards	Song of the Year	"Hayastan Jan"	Sochi	Won	
2019	Song of the Year Awards	Song of the Year	"Hayastani Axjikner"	Sochi	Won	
2020	Distinctive International Arab Festivals Awards	—N/a	Herself	Dubai	Won	

Awards and achievements
Preceded by Genealogy with "Face The Shadow"	Armenia in the Eurovision Song Contest; 2016	Succeeded by Artsvik with "Fly With Me"
Preceded by Carla, Élodie Gossuin and Olivier Minne	Junior Eurovision Song Contest presenter 2022; With: Garik Papoyan and Karina Ignatyan	Succeeded by Olivier Minne and Laury Thilleman
