= Northern Avenue, Yerevan =

Street in Yerevan, Armenia

Coordinates: 40°10′56″N 44°30′53″E

Northern Avenue
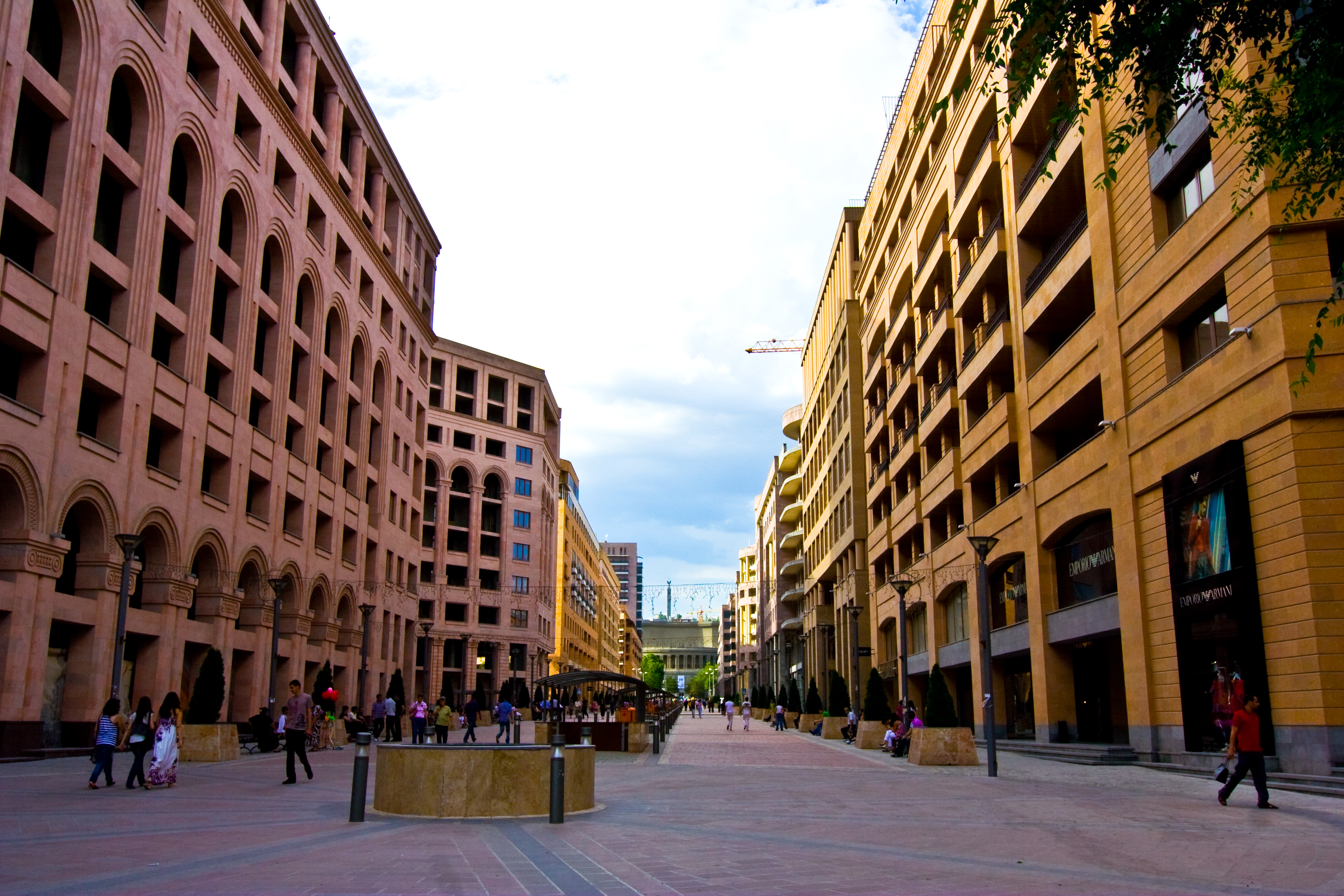
- Northern Avenue
- Interactive map of Northern Avenue
- Native name: Հյուսիսային պողոտա (Armenian)
- Length: 450 m (1,480 ft)
- Width: 27 m
- Location: Kentron district, Yerevan, Armenia

Construction
- Inauguration: 2007

Northern Avenue (Armenian: Հյուսիսային պողոտա, romanized: Hyusisayin poghota) is a pedestrian avenue in Yerevan, Armenia, opened in 2007. It is in the central Kentron district and links Abovyan Street with Freedom Square on Tumanyan street. It is 450 metres (1,480 ft) long and 27 metres (89 ft) wide.

Located in downtown Yerevan, the avenue is mainly home to luxurious residential buildings, high-end branded shops, commercial offices, coffee shops, hotels, restaurants, and nightclubs.

== History ==
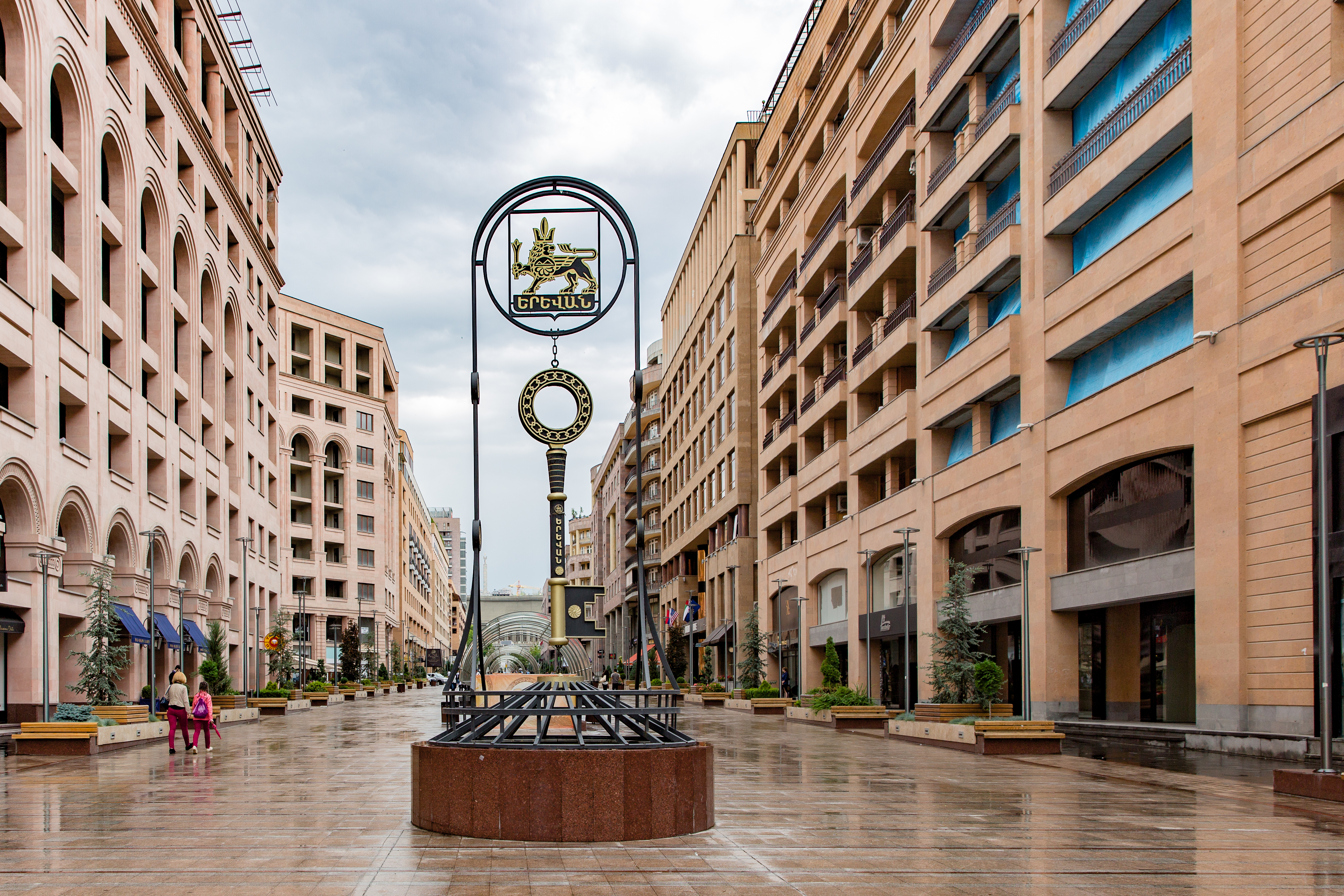
The symbolic key of Yerevan

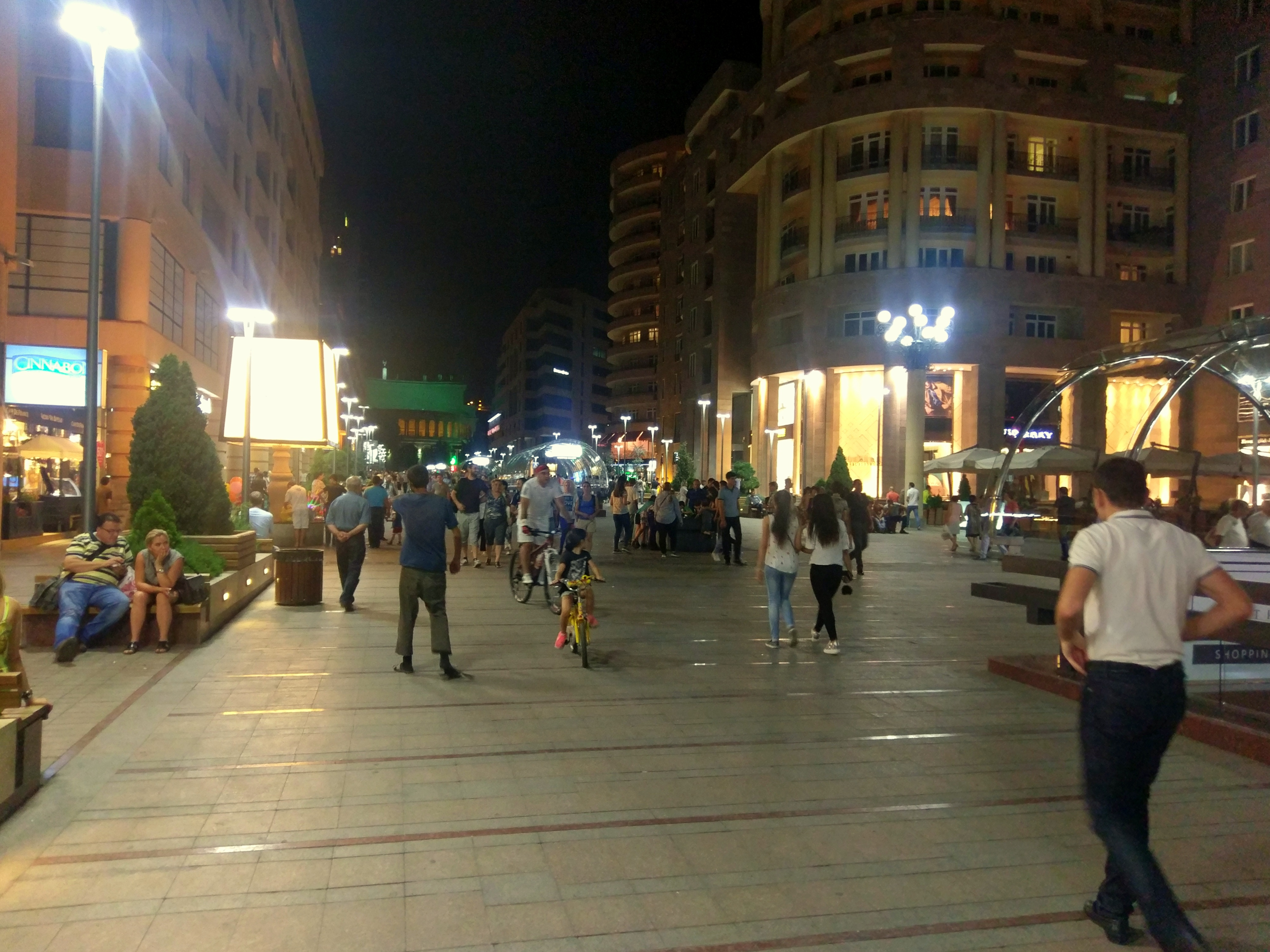
The Avenue at night

Although it was planned by the main architect of Yerevan Alexander Tamanian in 1924, the actual plan was never implemented during the Soviet period. A decade after the collapse of the Soviet Union, the Yerevan City Council decided to set for the construction of the avenue. According to the original plans, the National Gallery and the History Museum at Republic Square were never meant to be built on the current location, so Northern Avenue ends near their building, rather than opening directly into Republic Square.

The construction of the avenue started on 26 March 2002, based on the original plan of Alexander Tamanian which was developed and redesigned by architect Narek Sargsyan.

The construction of the avenue was financed by the private sector. First, the government bought up all the small informal properties along the route of the street, consolidated the land into larger, more feasible lots for high-rise developers, and auctioned those lots off. This process was done section by section, and raised a great deal of complaints from the previous landowners.

Based on its revised design, Northern Avenue is home to 4 small squares and 11 buildings with an average height of 9 floors. Many types of stone were used in the construction including basalt, granite, travertine and tufa. The avenue has a 2-story underground parking area.

The official inauguration of the avenue took place on 16 November 2007. However, it was entirely renovated in 2014, and the 2-story parking area was partially converted into an underground shopping mall, with escalators leading down from Northern Avenue.

Europe Day festivities are held along Northern Avenue annually between May and June. Events include concerts and performances, in addition to interactive information booths and a wide range of pavilions and exhibitions set up along the avenue.

=== Europe Square ===
On 28 March 2019, a section of Northern Avenue was renamed "Europe Square" in celebration of the 70th anniversary of the establishment of the Council of Europe. The initiative was led by the representative office of Armenia to the Council of Europe. The Vice Speaker of the National Assembly Alen Simonyan stated, "Over the past 28 years following its independence, Armenia adhered to pan-European values and continues building its cooperation in the European direction", during a ceremony held at the newly inaugurated square. During the ceremony, former Mayor of Yerevan Hayk Marutyan and the former President of PACE Liliane Maury Pasquier unveiled a plaque within the square.

== Shops ==
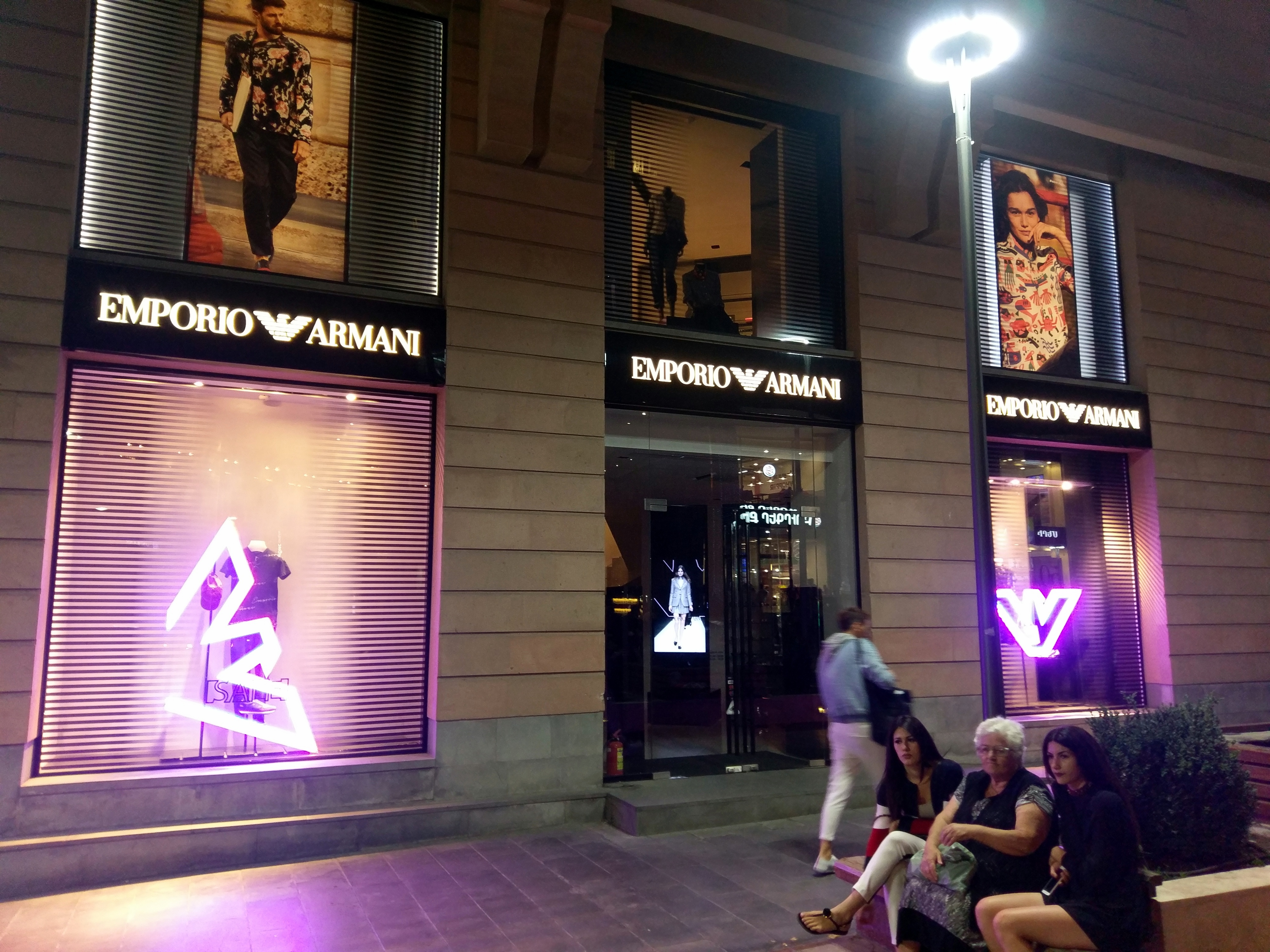
Emporio Armani store on Northern Avenue

Northern Avenue is home to a number of international fashion brands and luxury stores, including Burberry, Armani, Massimo Dutti, Ralph Lauren, Tommy Hilfiger, Cole Haan, and Zegna. Many restaurants and coffee-shops are also operating on the avenue, including a Cinnabon, Pizza Hut, and KFC.

=== Tashir Street Shopping Gallery ===
On 14 May 2016, the two-story underground Tashir Street Shopping Gallery was opened beneath the boulevard, with the first level housing a shopping center and an underground parking garage on the second level. Approximately 70 stores can be found offering various clothing, shoes, interior decorations, furniture, children's products, accessories, and more. Starting from 2018, the shopping center began organizing cultural events and exhibitions.

== Gallery ==
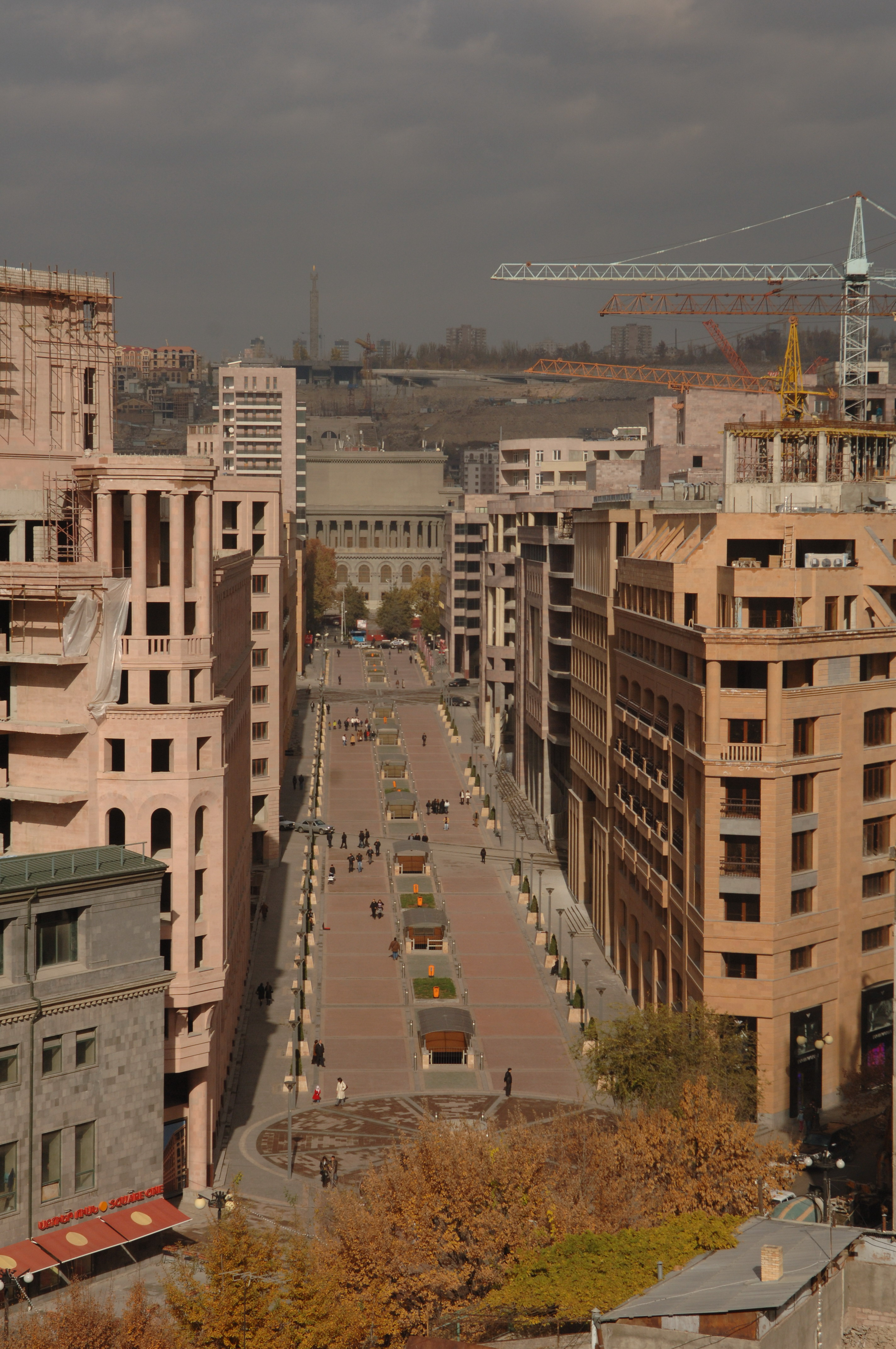

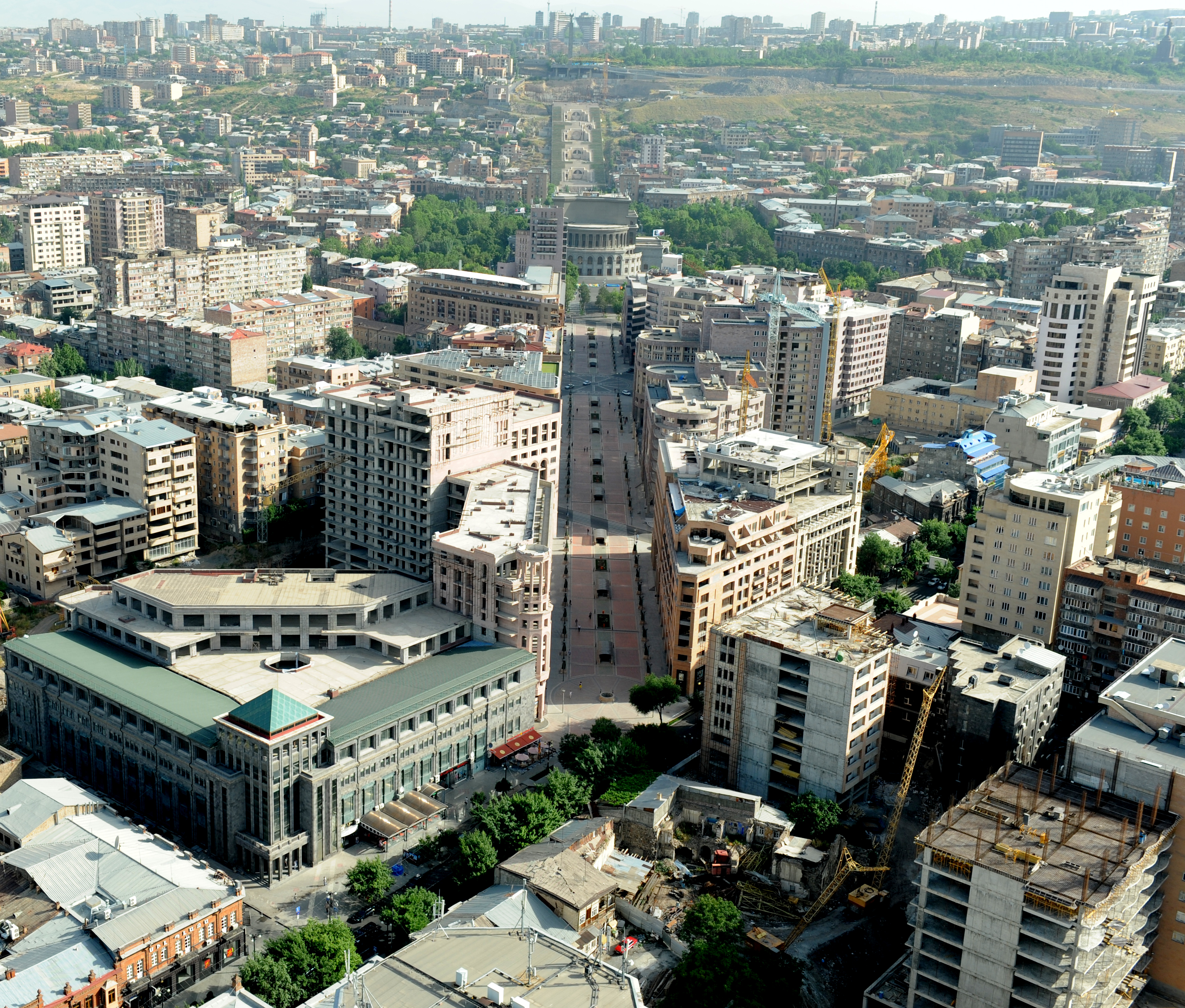

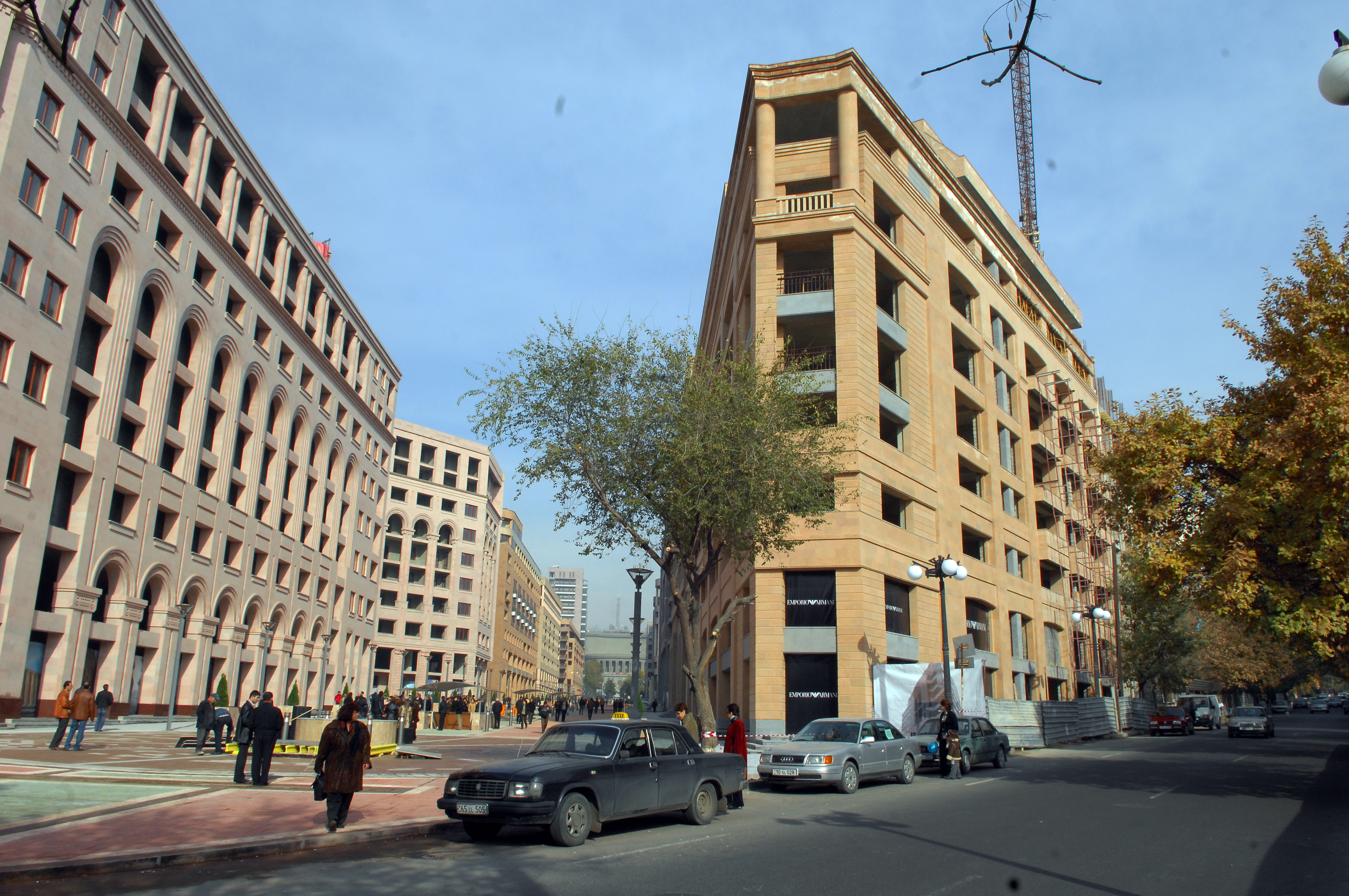

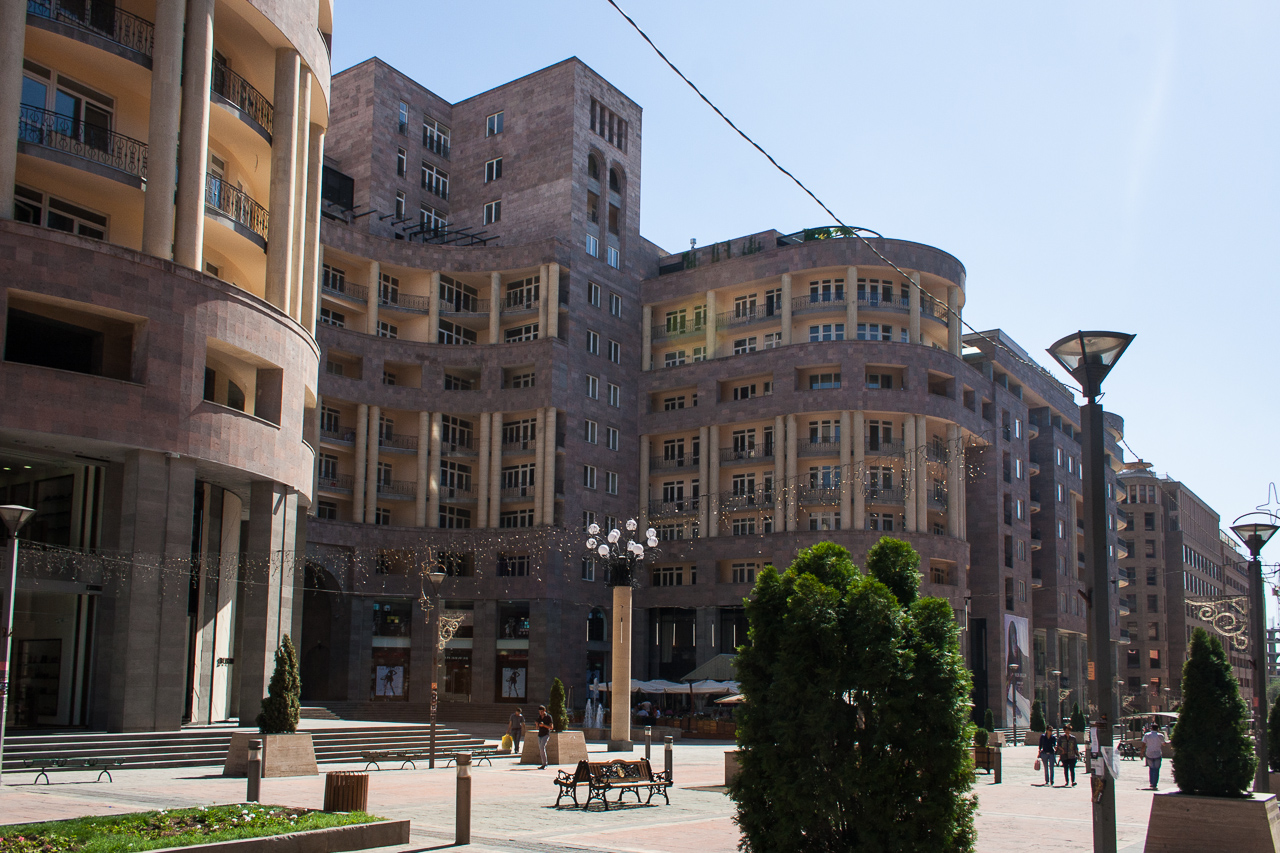
North Avenue Center

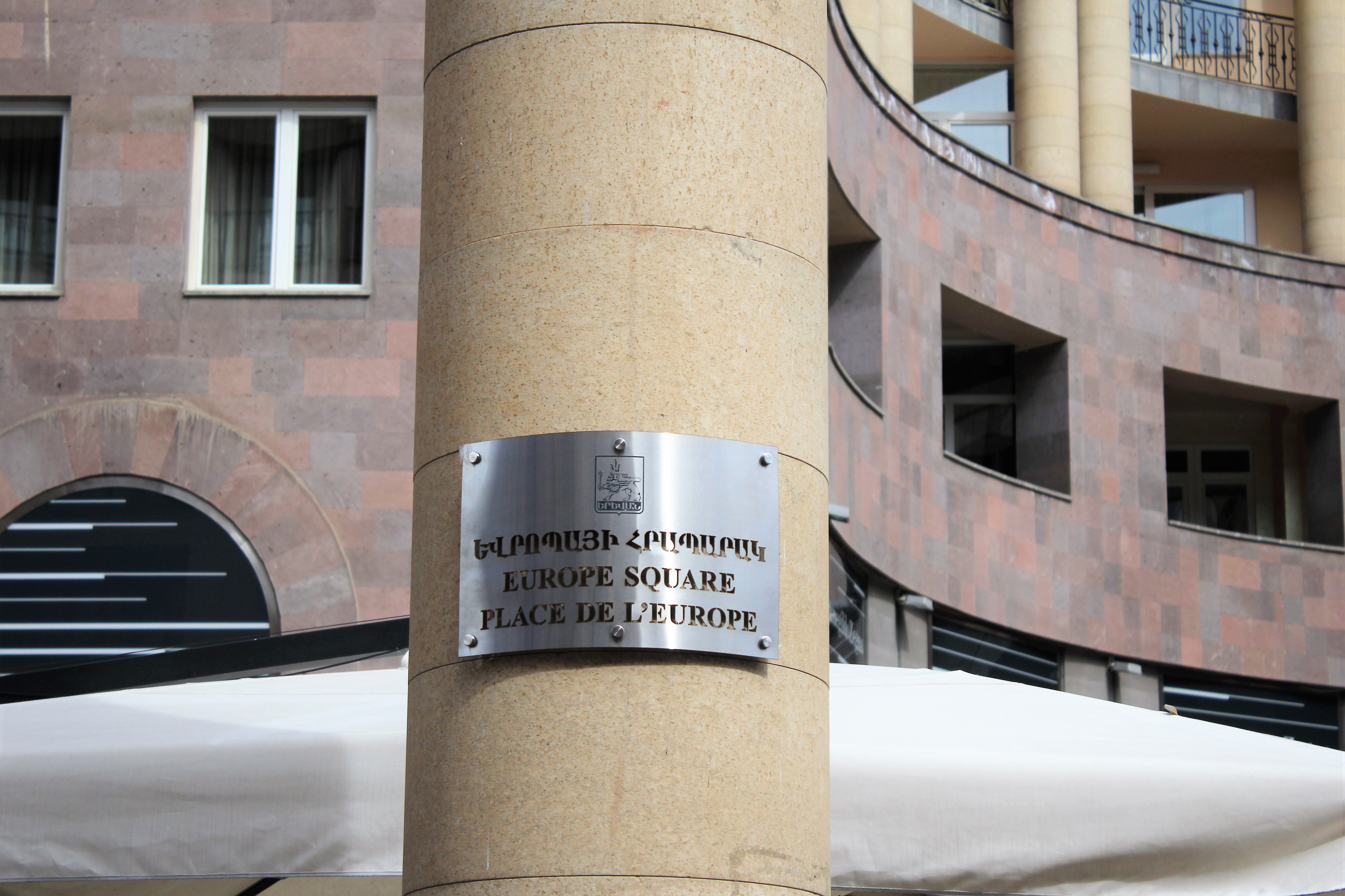
Europe Square Sign
