= Aram Mp3 =

Armenian singer and comedian (born 1984)

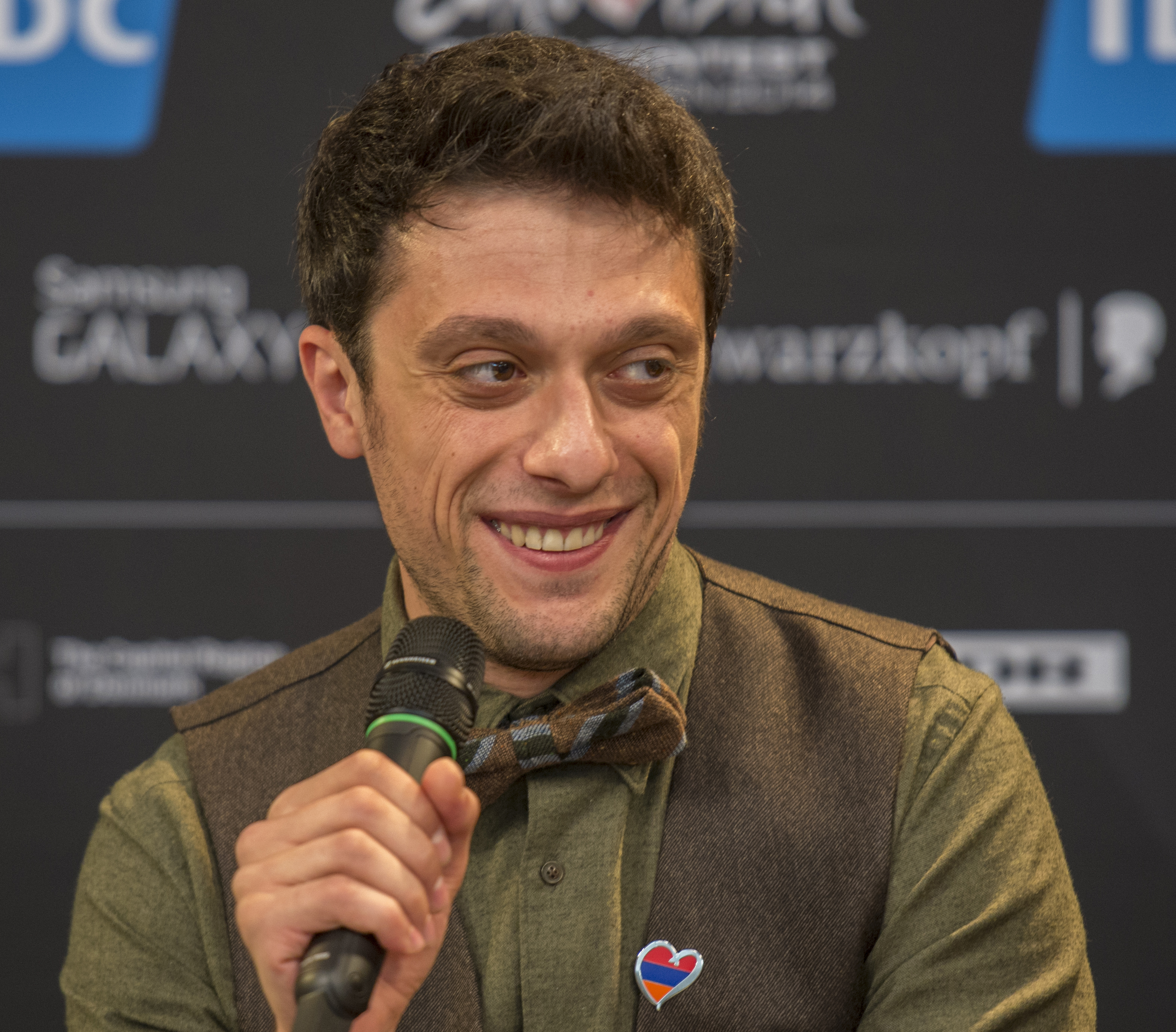
- Aram Mp3 at the Eurovision Song Contest 1st press conference in 2014

Background information
- Born: Aram Sargsyan; 5 April 1984 (age 42); Yerevan, Armenian SSR, USSR
- Genres: Pop; dubstep
- Occupations: Singer; comedian; showman
- Years active: 2006–present

Signature
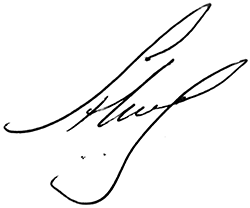

Aram Avetiki Sargsyan (Armenian: Արամ Ավետիքի Սարգսյան; born 5 April 1984), known professionally as Aram Mp3 (Armenian: Արամ Mp3; often stylized as Aram MP3), is an Armenian singer and comedian. He represented Armenia in the Eurovision Song Contest 2014 with the song "Not Alone", which finished in fourth place.

== Early life ==
Aram Sargsyan was born on 5 April 1984 in Armenia's capital Yerevan. Ever since he was a child, he has been involved in a number of choirs and theatrical performances. He got a bachelor's degree in pharmacy at Yerevan State Medical University, from which he graduated in 2006. During his studies at the YSMU, he played in the KVN comedy show, first among Armenian universities and later in the Armenian team Ararat in Moscow.

== Career ==
=== 2006–2012: Early beginnings ===
In 2006, Aram joined several other comedians—largely unknown to the public—to form the 32 Teeth (32 ատամ) comedy show. During his first years in 32 Teeth, he often performed humorous covers of popular songs, earning the nickname "Aram Mp3", referring to the common audio format MP3. One of his colleagues, Vahagn Grigoryan, gave him that pseudonym. In 2007, he became the winner of Armenia 1's 2 Stars (2 աստղ) TV show.

During this time Aram started to perform live in jazz and blues clubs, record songs and shoot music videos. Famous TV formats such as X-Factor, Hay Superstar, My Name Is..., Power Of 10 were hosted by him and brought him more fame. In 2010, Aram and his friends created the Vitamin Club (Վիտամին ակումբ) stand-up comedy TV show, which was broadcast by Shant TV every week. He has also hosted several shows on Armenia TV. In particular, he co-hosted the Nice Evening program on Armenia 1 with Garik Papoyan.

=== 2013–2014: Eurovision Song Contest ===
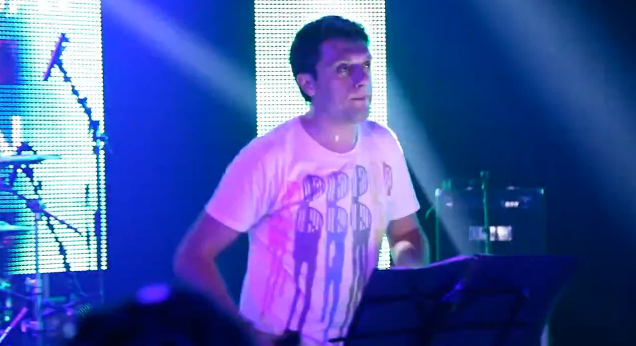
Aram performing in 2013

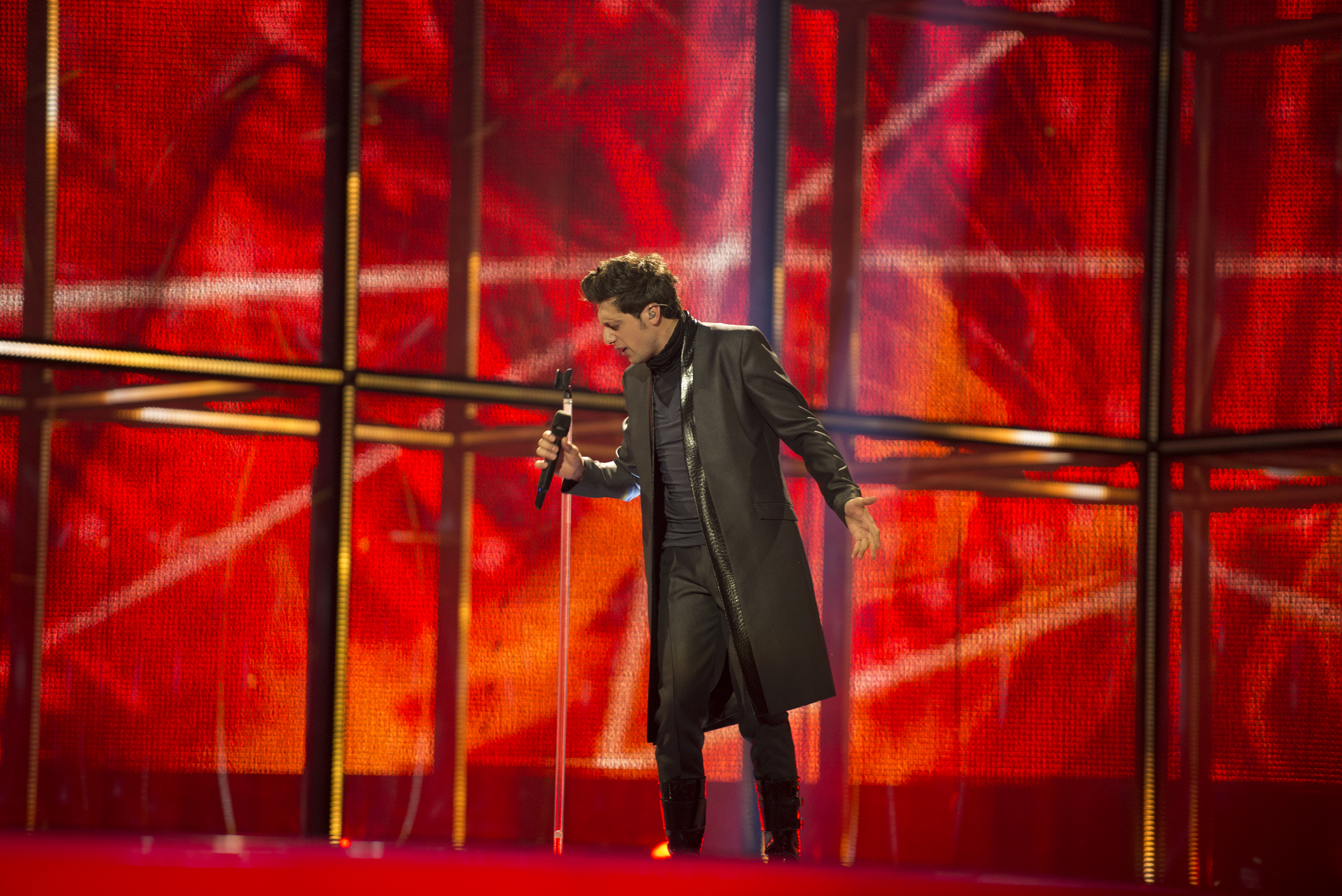
Aram performing during the first dress rehearsal of the first semi-final of the Eurovision 2014

In 2013, Aram began to work more on his musical career. He released his first solo music videos for his singles "Shine" and "If I Tried". Both songs were written by Aram himself and his friend, Garik Papoyan.

On 31 December 2013, Aram Mp3 was selected by the Public Television Company of Armenia to represent Armenia at the Eurovision Song Contest 2014 in Denmark. During the semi-final allocation draw on 20 January 2014 at the Copenhagen City Hall, Armenia was drawn to compete in the first half of the first semi-final on 6 May 2014. On 14 March 2014, it was announced that Aram would sing his song "Not Alone" in Copenhagen.

In the run-up to the competition, Aram criticised the Austrian performer, drag queen Conchita Wurst in remarks that were characterised as homophobic and transphobic, claiming that her lifestyle was "not natural" and that she should "eventually decide whether she is a woman or a man"; he later apologised and insisted his statements were "a joke" and had not intended to offend Wurst, though maintained that he considered homosexuality to be "unacceptable". He later met in person with Conchita and was photographed exchanging words and hugging with the artist, and put out another apology where he stated that he 'rejects homophobia'.

In the first semi-final, the producers of the show decided that Armenia would open the semi-final and perform 1st. Armenia qualified from the first semi-final and competed in the final on 10 May 2014. During the winner's press conference for the first semi-final qualifiers, Armenia was allocated to compete in the first half of the final. In the final, the producers of the show decided that Armenia would perform seventh. Aram finished the contest in 4th place with 174 points.

=== 2014–present: After Eurovision ===
After Eurovision, he appeared as a guest star on many Armenian TV shows such as The Voice and X Factor. Aram's new single "Help" was released on 7 February 2015.

In 2016, he voiced Adult Simba, both speaking and singing, and was also the lead singer of Circle of Life in the Armenian version of The Lion King.

Starting in 2016, he participated as a judge and mentor in the Armenian Eurovision National final, where his team was made up of Saro Gevorgyan, LUCY, Lilit Harutyunyan, and Jujo. However, they all got eliminated with LUCY placing 6th in the contest. In February 2017, Iveta Mukuchyan and Aram Mp3 released a collaborative single together titled "Dashterov". On 21 May, Iveta Mukuchyan announced a new traditional project with Aram MP3 called "Dashterov". The first song ("El Eghnim") of that project was released on 15 June and the second one ("Let the wind blow") was released on 22 June. In the same month, Sargsyan participated in a new project to help all the Armenian children who suffer from cancer. Many prominent Armenian singers were also participating, such as Mihran Tsarukyan, Erik Karapetyan, and Iveta Mukuchyan.

== Personal life ==
Aram married Anna Margaryan in April 2008. Their son Arno was born in June 2011.

== Discography ==
=== Singles ===
==== As lead artist ====
Title	Year	Peak chart positions										Album
Title	Year	BEL (WA)	AUT	DEN	GER	HUN	IRE	NLD	SWE	SWI	UK	Album
"Positive" (with Shprot)	2008	—	—	—	—	—	—	—	—	—	—	Non-album singles
"Shine"	2013	—	—	—	—	—	—	—	—	—	—	Non-album singles
"If I Tried"	2013	—	—	—	—	—	—	—	—	—	—	Non-album singles
"Just Go On"	2013	—	—	—	—	—	—	—	—	—	—	Non-album singles
"Not Alone"	2014	36^{[A]}	31	21	44	11	60	94	45	53	88	Non-album singles
"Help"	2014	—	—	—	—	—	—	—	—	—	—	Non-album singles
"Magic"	2014	—	—	—	—	—	—	—	—	—	—	Non-album singles
"You're My Sunshine" (featuring The Sunside Band)	2015	—	—	—	—	—	—	—	—	—	—	Non-album singles
"Asa"	2016	—	—	—	—	—	—	—	—	—	—	Non-album singles
"Alabalanica"	2019	—	—	—	—	—	—	—	—	—	—	Non-album singles
"Heriq eghav"	2020	—	—	—	—	—	—	—	—	—	—	Non-album singles
"Heros tgherq" (with Arame, Arabo Ispiryan, Mihran Tsarukyan, Mkrtich Arzumanyan and Arsen Safaryan)	2020	—	—	—	—	—	—	—	—	—	—	Non-album singles
"Kochari"	2020	—	—	—	—	—	—	—	—	—	—	Non-album singles
"Depi Bardzunq"	2023	—	—	—	—	—	—	—	—	—	—	2023 European Weightlifting Championships
"—" denotes a single that did not chart or was not released.

==== "Dashterov" collaboration ====
No.	Title	Length
1.	"Ալ Էղնիմ" (Al Eghnim)	5:50
2.	"Քամին զանա" (Qamin Zana)	3:59
3.	"Ղափամա" (Ghapama)	2:39
4.	"Նինո" (Nino)	3:05
5.	"Ծիրանի ծառ" (Tsirani tzar)	2:59
6.	"Գորանի" (Gorani)	3:17

== Filmography ==
Television
Year	Title	Role	Notes
2006–10	32 Atam (32 ատամ)	Himself	Comedy TV show
2007–08	2 Stars (2 աստղ)	Singer	Featuring Shprot
2010	Our Yard (Մեր բակը)	Himself	Main cast
2010–15	Vitamin Club	Himself	Comedy TV show
2010–13	X-Factor	Host	
2011–12	Hay Superstar	Host	
2011	Gerdastane (Գերդաստանը)	Tigran	Main cast
2016	Full House (Ֆուլ Հաուս)	Himself	1 episode
2016	The Lion King (Առյուծ արքան)	Adult Simba	Armenian dub
2016–17	Depi Evratesil (Դեպի Եվրատեսիլ)	Judge/Mentor	Armenian Eurovision National final
2017–19	Nice Evening (Լավ Երեկո)	Host	Featuring Garik Papoyan
2017	Benefis (Բենեֆիս)	Presenter, guest	Episode: Avet Barseghyan
2017	Hayastan Jan (Հայաստան Ջան)	Contestant	
2020–21	Velo MP3 (Վելո ՄՊ3)	Host	

== Awards and nominations ==
Year	Organization	Award	Recipient	Result
2011	Luxury Magazine	Advertising Face of the Year	Himself	Won
2014	Luxury Magazine	Presenter of the Year	Himself	Nominated
2014	Luxury Magazine	Comedian of the Year	Himself	Won
2017	Armenian Europe Music Awards	Collaboration of the Year	Dashterov	Won

Awards and achievements
Preceded by Dorians with "Lonely Planet"	Armenia in the Eurovision Song Contest; 2014	Succeeded by Genealogy with "Face The Shadow"
