= Armenia in the Eurovision Song Contest 2007 =

- Eurovision Song Contest 2007
- Participating broadcaster: Public Television of Armenia (AMPTV)
- Country: Armenia
- Selection process: Evrotesil 2007
- Selection date: 25 February 2007

Competing entry
- Song: "Anytime You Need"
- Artist: Hayko
- Songwriters: Hayk Hakobyan; Karen Kavaleryan

Placement
- Final result: 8th, 138 points

Participation chronology

Armenia was represented at the Eurovision Song Contest 2007 with the song "Anytime You Need", composed by Hayk Hakobyan, with lyrics by Karen Kavaleryan, and performed by Hakobyan himself under his stage name Hayko. The Armenian participating broadcaster, Public Television of Armenia (AMPTV), selected its entry through the national final Evrotesil 2007. The national final and consisted of three shows: two semi-finals and a final. Ten entries competed in each semi-final with three from each semi-final alongside a wildcard qualifying to compete in the final on 25 February 2007. "Anytime You Need" performed by Hayko was selected by a professional jury as the winner.

As one of the ten highest placed finishers in 2006, Armenia automatically qualified to compete in the final of the Eurovision Song Contest. Performing during the show in position 23, Armenia placed eighth out of the 24 participating countries with 138 points.

== Background ==
Prior to the 2007 contest, Public Television of Armenia (AMPTV) had participated in the Eurovision Song Contest representing Armenia only once, in 2006 with the song "Without Your Love" performed by André, which placed eighth in the final.

As part of its duties as participating broadcaster, AMPTV organises the selection of its entry in the Eurovision Song Contest and broadcasts the event in the country. The broadcaster confirmed its intentions to participate at the 2007 contest on 25 October 2006. In 2006, AMPTV internally selected both the artist and the song. For 2007, along with its participation confirmation, AMPTV announced that it would organise a national final to select its entry.

== Before Eurovision ==
=== Evrotesil 2007 ===
Evrotesil 2007 was the national final that selected the Armenian entry for the Eurovision Song Contest 2007. The competition commenced on 23 February 2007 with the first of two semi-finals and concluded with a winning song and artist during the final on 25 February 2007. All shows in the competition took place at the AMPTV studios in Yerevan, hosted by Gohar Gasparyan and André (who represented Armenia in 2006) and broadcast on Channel 1.

==== Format ====
The national final took place over three stages and consisted of three shows. The first stage was a submission period where artists and songwriters had the opportunity to apply by submitting their entries online. Twenty entries were selected to proceed to the second stage of the competition. The second stage consisted of the semi-finals which took place on 23 and 24 February 2007 with ten entries competing in each show, from which three proceeded to the final from each semi-final. The broadcaster also reserved the right to select a wildcard act to proceed to the final out of the non-qualifying entries from both semi-finals. The third stage was the final which took place on 25 February 2007, during which the winner was selected from the remaining entries.

The results of the semi-finals were determined by a professional jury panel and a public vote. The jury first selected two songs to advance and the third qualifier was selected by the public vote from the remaining eight entries. In the final, the winner was selected exclusively by a professional jury panel. The public were able to cast their votes via SMS during each of the three shows, however their results were not considered in the final.

==== Competing entries ====
AMPTV announced a submission period with a deadline of 31 November 2006. Artists were required to be of Armenian citizenship, while songwriters worldwide were able to submit songs. From all entries received at the closing of the deadline, twenty entries proceeded to the national final which were announced on 15 February 2007.

Artist	Song	Songwriter(s)
Arina Hovhannisyan	"Colour of My Tears"	Arnold Fritzsch
Arshaluys Sargsyan	"Togh vor aysor" (Թող վոր այսօր)	Emil Svajyan, Arshaluys Sargsyan
Asta	"My Story"	Edgar Hakobyan
Emmy	"You've Done It"	Rafael Artesero
Erik	"Togh qich chtva" (Թող խիչ չթվա)	Zara Petrosyan
Gevorg Martirosyan	"Nor ughiner" (Նոր ուղիներ)	Vahram Petrosyan, Sergey Grigoryan
Hariel Sando	"Only Music Makes Me Strong"	Harutyun Apresyan
Hayer	"You Need a Girl"	Brandon Stone
Hayko	"Anytime You Need"	Hayk Hakobyan, Karen Kavaleryan
Jacklina Tumanyan	"Angel"	Thomas Thörnholm, Michael Clauss, Dan Attlerud
Karine Asiryan	"Your Heart Is Hot"	Roman Ignatyev, Natalya Sidortsova, Anita Hakhverdyan
Lana Khachatryan	"Hate When You're Gone"	Emil Svajyan, Anush Manukyan
Marianna Hovhannisyan	"I'll Prove I'm Stronger"	Emil Svajyan, Anush Manukyan
Meri Voskanyan	"Again, Again"	Meri Voskanyan, Adam Kesselhaut
Meri Voskanyan	"Carry Me In"	Meri Voskanyan, Adam Kesselhaut, Cande De Rouge
Nelly Poghosyan	"So I Will Go"	Arsen Adonts, Twana Rhodes
R.P.	"Kapuyt trchun" (Կապույտ թռչուն)	Vahan Khachatryan, Hayk Harutyunyan, Arpine Shahnubaryan
Sargis Edwards	"Rain"	Sargis Edwards
Sergey Grigoryan	"Qonn em" (Քոնն եմ)	Sergey Grigoryan
Vo.X	"I'm My Lover's"	Aram Rian

==== Shows ====
===== Semi-finals =====
The two semi-finals took place on 23 and 24 February 2007. In each semi-final ten entries competed and three qualified to the final. A professional jury first selected two songs to advance. The remaining eight entries then faced a public televote which determined an additional qualifier. Following the second semi-final, "Carry Me In" performed by Meri Voskanyan was announced to have received a jury wildcard and also qualified to the final.

Jury qualifier Public vote qualifier Wildcard qualifier

Semi-final 1 – 23 February 2007
R/O	Artist	Song	Televote	Place	Result
1	Jacklina Tumanyan	"Angel"	178	5	—N/a
2	Hariel Sando	"Only Music Makes Me Strong"	36	9	—N/a
3	R.P.	"Kapuyt trchun"	98	7	—N/a
4	Nelly Poghosyan	"So I Will Go"	32	10	—N/a
5	Gevorg Martirosyan	"Nor ughiner"	210	3	—N/a
6	Asta	"My Story"	420	2	Qualified
7	Arshaluys Sargsyan	"Togh vor aysor"	131	6	—N/a
8	Sergey Grigoryan	"Qonn em"	72	8	Qualified
9	Arina Hovhannisyan	"Colour of My Tears"	634	1	Qualified
10	Erik	"Togh qich chtva"	196	4	—N/a

Semi-final 2 – 24 February 2007
R/O	Artist	Song	Televote	Place	Result
1	Hayer	"You Need a Girl"	318	9	—N/a
2	Meri Voskanyan	"Again, Again"	633	7	—N/a
3	Vo.X	"I'm My Lover's"	210	10	—N/a
4	Karine Asiryan	"Your Heart Is Hot"	2,460	2	Qualified
5	Sargis Edwards	"Rain"	2,284	3	—N/a
6	Marianna Hovhannisyan	"I'll Prove I'm Stronger"	2,121	4	—N/a
7	Hayko	"Anytime You Need"	3,418	1	Qualified
8	Meri Voskanyan	"Carry Me In"	1,173	6	Wildcard
9	Emmy	"You've Done It"	1,793	5	Qualified
10	Lana Khachatryan	"Hate When You're Gone"	544	8	—N/a

===== Final =====
The final took place on 25 February 2007. The seven entries that qualified from the preceding two semi-finals competed and the winner, "Anytime You Need" performed by Hayko, was selected by a professional jury. A public televote also took place during the show with Hayko also receiving the most votes (5,170 votes).

Final – 25 February 2007
R/O	Artist	Song
1	Sergey Grigoryan	"Qonn em"
2	Karine Asiryan	"Your Heart Is Hot"
3	Emmy	"You've Done It"
4	Asta	"My Story"
5	Hayko	"Anytime You Need"
6	Arina Hovhannisyan	"Colour of My Tears"
7	Meri Voskanyan	"Carry Me In"

== At Eurovision ==
All countries except the "Big 4" (France, Germany, Spain, and the United Kingdom), the host country, and the ten highest placed finishers in the 2006 contest are required to qualify from the semi-final in order to compete for the final; the top ten countries from the semi-final progress to the final. As one of the ten highest placed finishers in the 2006 contest, Armenia automatically qualified to compete in the final on 12 May 2007. In addition to their participation in the final, Armenia is also required to broadcast and vote in the semi-final on 10 May 2007. On 12 March 2007, a special allocation draw was held which determined the running order and Armenia was set to perform in position 23 during the final, following the entry from Turkey and before the entry from Moldova.

In Armenia, both the semi-final and the final were broadcast on Channel 1 with commentary by Gohar Gasparyan. AMPTV appointed Sirusho as its spokesperson to announce the Armenian votes during the final.

=== Final ===
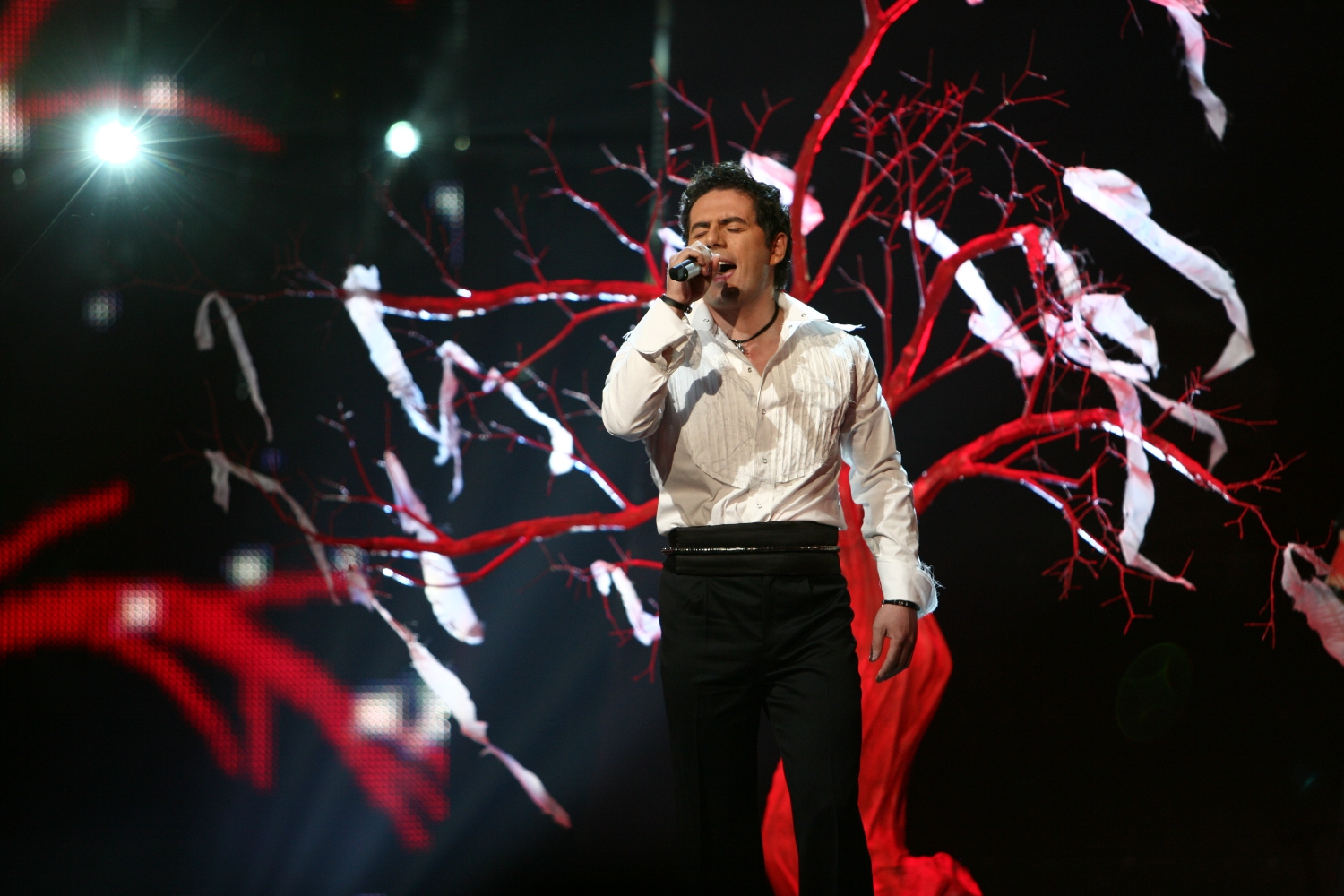
Hayko during a rehearsal before the final

Hayko took part in technical rehearsals on 8 and 9 May, followed by dress rehearsals on 11 and 12 May. The Armenian performance featured Hayko dressed in a white shirt and black trousers performing on stage together with two backing vocalists, a drummer and a flautist. The stage presentation included a red leafless tree with its branches tied with white ribbons, smoke effects at the beginning of the performance as well as the use of a wind machine throughout the performance. A bloodstain also appeared on Hayko's shirt as the song progressed. The LED screens projected snowflakes rushing through red trees that formed large heart symbols at all sides and the stage lighting displayed white colours. The stage director and choreographer for the Armenian performance was Andrey Sychov. The backing vocalists that joined Hayko on stage were Goga and Tigran Petrosyan, the drummer was Ara Torosyan, and the flautist was Arthur. Armenia placed eighth in the final, scoring 138 points.

=== Voting ===
Below is a breakdown of points awarded to Armenia and awarded by Armenia in the semi-final and grand final of the contest. The nation awarded its 12 points to Belarus in the semi-final and to Russia in the final of the contest.

==== Points awarded to Armenia ====
Points awarded to Armenia (Final)
Score	Country
12 points	Georgia; Turkey
10 points	Belgium; Czech Republic; France; Netherlands; Poland; Russia
8 points	Bulgaria; Cyprus; Spain
7 points	
6 points	Greece
5 points	Austria; Belarus; Israel; Ukraine
4 points	
3 points	
2 points	Germany; Moldova
1 point	

==== Points awarded by Armenia ====
Points awarded by Armenia (Semi-final)
Score	Country
12 points	Belarus
10 points	Serbia
8 points	Georgia
7 points	Moldova
6 points	Portugal
5 points	Poland
4 points	Cyprus
3 points	Norway
2 points	Turkey
1 point	Bulgaria

Points awarded by Armenia (Final)
Score	Country
12 points	Russia
10 points	Belarus
8 points	Greece
7 points	Serbia
6 points	Ukraine
5 points	Georgia
4 points	Bulgaria
3 points	Moldova
2 points	France
1 point	Bosnia and Herzegovina
