= Narine Dovlatyan =

Armenian Jazz singer and actress

Narine Dovlatyan Նարինե Դովլաթյան
- Born: 7 January 1991 (age 34); Malishka, Armenian SSR, Soviet Union
- Genres: Jazz
- Years active: 2007–present
- Labels: Haik Solar & Arni Rock

Narine Dovlatyan (Armenian: Նարինե Դովլաթյան; born 7 January 1991) is an Armenian jazz singer and actress. She studied at Yerevan Komitas State Conservatory, department of jazz-vocal.

== Early life ==
Dovlatyan was born in Malishka, Armenia and moved to Yerevan at the age of nine in order to receive a musical education. She attended Yerevan Komitas State Conservatory. She participated in a series of concerts, both singing and dancing, after graduating from the school of continuing education Komitas State Conservatory in the jazz-vocal department.

== Music career ==
Narine appeared in Season 3 of Hay Superstar. She shared 9th-10th place with Diana Grigoryan.

In late 2010, Narine released her first music video called "Beautiful Sunday", a winter-themed song featured by Haik Solar & Arni Rock. She was nominated for 2010 Best New Artist for her song. She released another single, "Look into my eyes", in 2011. She sang this song at the 2011 Armenian National Music Awards (ANMA). Narine sang at the 2012 Armenian National Music Awards again the following year. She sang her single "At My Feet". Dovlatyan was also nominated for Best New Artist of 2012 and won.

== Discography ==
=== Albums ===
- Fake World (2024)

=== Singles ===
- Beautiful Sunday (2010)
- Hayastane Du Es (feat. Nick Egibyan, Emmy, and Emma Asatryan) (2011)
- Look into my eyes (2011)
- At My Feet (2012)
- Cactus (2013)
- That Scarf (2014)
- Al Ayloughs (2015)
- Spread the Light (2016)
- Strawberry Pie (2016)
- Feeding the Bright (feat. Tigran Hamasyan) (2017)
- Gentleman in Tie (feat. Vahram Yanikian) (2018)
- Yar Boyid Mernem (feat. Gevorg Margaryan) (2020)
- Sarvori Erge (2020)
- Hasht u Khaghagh Mardkutyun (2020)
- Na Pit Ertar (2020)
- He's a Wind Now (2020)
- Lusni grac ergy (feat. Ruben Yesayan) (2021)
- Snow (feat. Vardan Gaboyan) (2023)
- Erb kyanqe sur psherov (2024)

== Filmography ==
Television and web
Year	Title	Role	Notes
2016–2017	Abel's sister	Llith (Abel's sister)	Main Cast
