= Armenia in the Eurovision Song Contest 2013 =

- Eurovision Song Contest 2013
- Participating broadcaster: Public Television of Armenia (AMPTV)
- Country: Armenia
- Selection process: Artist: Internal selection Song: Evrotesil 2013
- Selection date: Artist: 22 January 2013; Song: 2 March 2013

Competing entry
- Song: "Lonely Planet"
- Artist: Dorians
- Songwriters: Tony Iommi; Vardan Zadoyan

Placement
- Semi-final result: Qualified (7th, 69 points)
- Final result: 18th, 41 points

Participation chronology

Armenia was represented at the Eurovision Song Contest 2013 with the song "Lonely Planet" written by Tony Iommi and Vardan Zadoyan. The song was performed by the band Dorians, which was selected internally by the Armenian broadcaster Public Television of Armenia (AMPTV) to represent Armenia in the 2013 contest in Malmö, Sweden. In May 2012, Armenia announced that they would be returning to the Eurovision Song Contest after a one-year absence following their withdrawal in 2012 due to tensions with then host country Azerbaijan. Gor Sujyan was announced as the Armenian artist on 22 January 2013, while the song was selected through a national final, which took place on 2 March 2013 where four songs competed. "Lonely Planet" was selected as the winning song following the combination of votes from a professional jury and a public televote. Sujyan later announced that he would perform at the Eurovision Song Contest as a member of Dorians.

Armenia was drawn to compete in the second semi-final of the Eurovision Song Contest which took place on 16 May 2013. Performing during the show in position 11, "Lonely Planet" was announced among the top 10 entries of the second semi-final and therefore qualified to compete in the final on 18 May. It was later revealed that Armenia placed seventh out of the 17 participating countries in the semi-final with 69 points. In the final, Armenia performed in position 12 and placed eighteenth out of the 26 participating countries with 41 points.

== Background ==
Prior to the 2013 contest, Armenia had participated in the Eurovision Song Contest six times since its first entry in 2006. Its highest placing in the contest, to this point, has been fourth place, which the nation achieved in 2008 with the song "Qélé, Qélé" performed by Sirusho. Armenia had, to this point, failed to qualify to the final on only one occasion in 2011 with the song "Boom Boom" performed by Emmy.

The Armenian national broadcaster, Public Television of Armenia (AMPTV), broadcasts the event within Armenia and organises the selection process for the nation's entry. After consistently being present for every contest since their debut in 2006, the Armenian broadcaster announced in March 2012 that the country would not participate in 2012 due to long-standing tensions with then host country Azerbaijan. Following their one-year absence, AMPTV confirmed their intentions to participate at the 2013 Eurovision Song Contest on 27 May 2012. Armenia has used various methods to select the Armenian entry in the past, such as a live televised national final to choose the performer, song or both to compete at Eurovision. However internal selections have also been held on occasion. The broadcaster opted to internally select the artist for the 2013 contest, with a national final being organized to select the song.

== Before Eurovision ==
=== Artist selection ===
The Armenian representative for the Eurovision Song Contest 2013 was internally selected by the AMPTV. On 21 January 2013, the broadcaster indicated that an artist had been selected and that their name would be announced on 22 January 2013. On 22 January, Gor Sujyan was announced as the Armenian representative. Sujyan previously attempted to represent Armenia at the Eurovision Song Contest in 2009 as the lead singer of the band Dorians, placing fourth in the national final Evrotesil 2009 with the song "Fly". The broadcaster also announced that a national final would be held to select his song.

=== Evrotesil 2013 ===
Following their artist reveal, AMPTV announced a public call for song submissions with a deadline of 20 February 2013. More than 70 songs were submitted by songwriters worldwide and a jury panel together with Gor Sujyan selected four songs to proceed to the national final, which took place on 2 March 2013 at the AMPTV studios in Yerevan, hosted by Gohar Gasparyan and Avet Barseghyan. The show was broadcast on Armenia 1 as well as online via the broadcaster's website 1tv.am and the official Eurovision Song Contest website eurovision.tv. All four competing songs were performed by Gor Sujyan and Dorians and the winning song, "Lonely Planet", was selected by the 50/50 combination of votes from a five-member professional jury and a public televote. The jury consisted of Sergey Smbatyan (conductor and director of State Youth Orchestra of Armenia), Sona (singer), Erik Antaranyan (television host), Gevorg Hakobyan (opera singer) and Karen Kazaryan (producer). In addition to the performances of the competing songs, the interval acts featured Armenian 2012 Junior Eurovision entrants Compass Band with "Sweetie Baby", Georgian 2013 Eurovision entrants Nodi Tatishvili and Sophie Gelovani with "Waterfall" and Maltese 2013 Eurovision entrant Gianluca Bezzina with "Tomorrow".

Evrotesil 2013 – 20 February 2013
R/O	Song	Songwriter(s)	Jury	Televote	Total	Place
1	"The Truth"	Armen Martirosyan	4	4	8	4
2	"No Time"	Lazzaro	3	1	4	2
3	"Toy Planet"	Gor Sujyan	2	3	5	3
4	"Lonely Planet"	Tony Iommi, Vardan Zadoyan	1	2	3	1

=== Preparation ===
Following the Armenian national final, Gor Sujyan announced that he would perform at the Eurovision Song Contest as part of Dorians; the other members of the band also accompanied the singer during the national final. The band later filmed the official video for "Lonely Planet", which was directed by Suren Tadevosyan and was released on 18 March 2013.

== At Eurovision ==
All countries except the "Big Five" (France, Germany, Italy, Spain and the United Kingdom), and the host country, are required to qualify from one of two semi-finals in order to compete for the final; the top ten countries from each semi-final progress to the final. The European Broadcasting Union (EBU) split up the competing countries into six different pots based on voting patterns from previous contests, with countries with favourable voting histories put into the same pot. On 17 January 2013, a special allocation draw was held which placed each country into one of the two semi-finals, as well as which half of the show they would perform in. Armenia was placed into the second semi-final, to be held on 16 May 2013, and was scheduled to perform in the second half of the show.

Once all the competing songs for the 2013 contest had been released, the running order for the semi-finals was decided by the shows' producers rather than through another draw, so that similar songs were not placed next to each other. Armenia was set to perform in position 11, following the entry from Israel and before the entry from Hungary.

In Armenia, the two semi-finals and the final were broadcast on Armenia 1 with commentary by André, who had previously represented Armenia in the Eurovision Song Contest in 2006, and Arevik Udumyan during the semi-finals, and by Erik Antaranyan and Anna Avanesyan during the final. The Armenian spokesperson, who announced the Armenian votes during the final, was André.

=== Semi-final ===
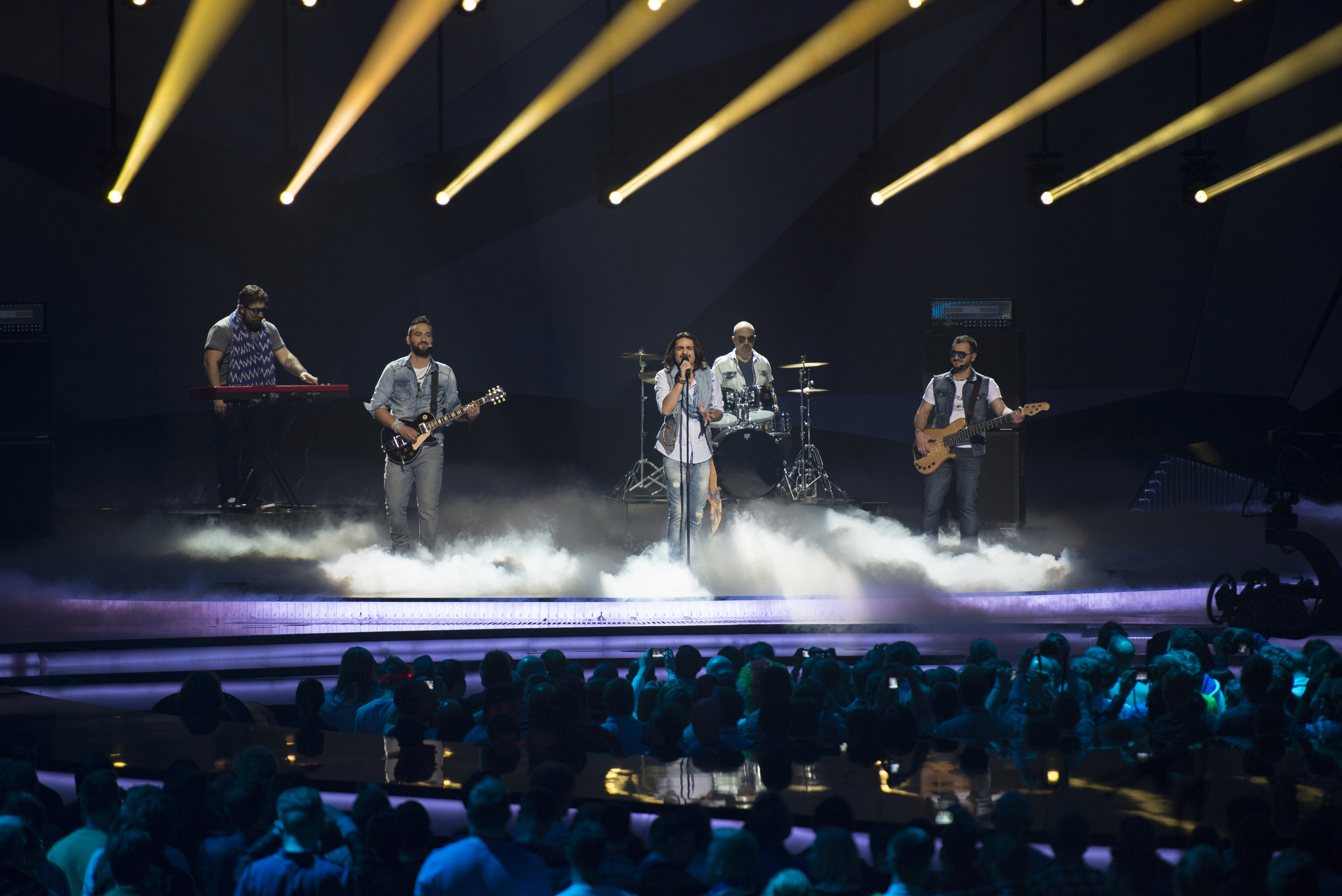
Dorians during a rehearsal before the second semi-final

Dorians took part in technical rehearsals on 9 and 11 May, followed by dress rehearsals on 15 and 16 May. This included the jury show on 15 May where the professional juries of each country watched and voted on the competing entries.

The Armenian performance featured the members of Dorians performing in a band set-up on stage. Gor Sujyan performed in jeans, white shirt and grey vest, while the other members were dressed in jeans outfits. The stage setting was predominately dark with moving spotlights being displayed directly towards the audience. The stage presentation also included pyrotechnic effects as well as the use of a wind machine throughout the performance.

At the end of the show, Armenia was announced as having finished in the top 10 and subsequently qualifying for the grand final. It was later revealed that Armenia placed seventh in the semi-final, receiving a total of 69 points.

=== Final ===
Shortly after the second semi-final, a winners' press conference was held for the ten qualifying countries. As part of this press conference, the qualifying artists took part in a draw to determine which half of the grand final they would subsequently participate in. This draw was done in the order the countries appeared in the semi-final running order. Armenia was drawn to compete in the first half. Following this draw, the shows' producers decided upon the running order of the final, as they had done for the semi-finals. Armenia was subsequently placed to perform in position 12, following the entry from Germany and before the entry from Netherlands.

Dorians once again took part in dress rehearsals on 17 and 18 May before the final, including the jury final where the professional juries cast their final votes before the live show. Dorians performed a repeat of their semi-final performance during the final on 18 May. At the conclusion of the voting, Armenia finished in eighteenth place with 41 points.

=== Voting ===
Voting during the three shows consisted of 50 percent public televoting and 50 percent from a jury deliberation. The jury consisted of five music industry professionals who were citizens of the country they represent. This jury was asked to judge each contestant based on: vocal capacity; the stage performance; the song's composition and originality; and the overall impression by the act. In addition, no member of a national jury could be related in any way to any of the competing acts in such a way that they cannot vote impartially and independently.

Following the release of the full split voting by the EBU after the conclusion of the competition, it was revealed that Armenia had placed fifteenth with the public televote and nineteenth with the jury vote in the final. In the public vote, Armenia received an average rank of 15.11, while with the jury vote, Armenia received an average rank of 14.44. In the second semi-final, Armenia placed eleventh with the public televote with an average rank of 9.44 and seventh with the jury vote with an average rank of 7.15.

Below is a breakdown of points awarded to Armenia and awarded by Armenia in the first semi-final and grand final of the contest. The nation awarded its 12 points to Georgia in the semi-final and to Ukraine in the final of the contest.

==== Points awarded to Armenia ====
Points awarded to Armenia (Semi-final 2)
Score	Country
12 points	France
10 points	Georgia
8 points	Bulgaria; Israel; Malta
7 points	Greece
6 points	Germany
5 points	Romania
4 points	Norway
3 points	
2 points	
1 point	Latvia

Points awarded to Armenia (Final)
Score	Country
12 points	
10 points	Georgia
8 points	Bulgaria
7 points	France
6 points	Ukraine
5 points	
4 points	
3 points	Hungary
2 points	Belarus; Russia
1 point	Malta; Moldova; San Marino

==== Points awarded by Armenia ====
Points awarded by Armenia (Semi-final 2)
Score	Country
12 points	Georgia
10 points	Bulgaria
8 points	Greece
7 points	Malta
6 points	Israel
5 points	Norway
4 points	San Marino
3 points	Romania
2 points	Switzerland
1 point	Iceland

Points awarded by Armenia (Final)
Score	Country
12 points	Ukraine
10 points	Georgia
8 points	Greece
7 points	Russia
6 points	Malta
5 points	Belarus
4 points	Denmark
3 points	Norway
2 points	France
1 point	Italy
