= Gor Sujyan =

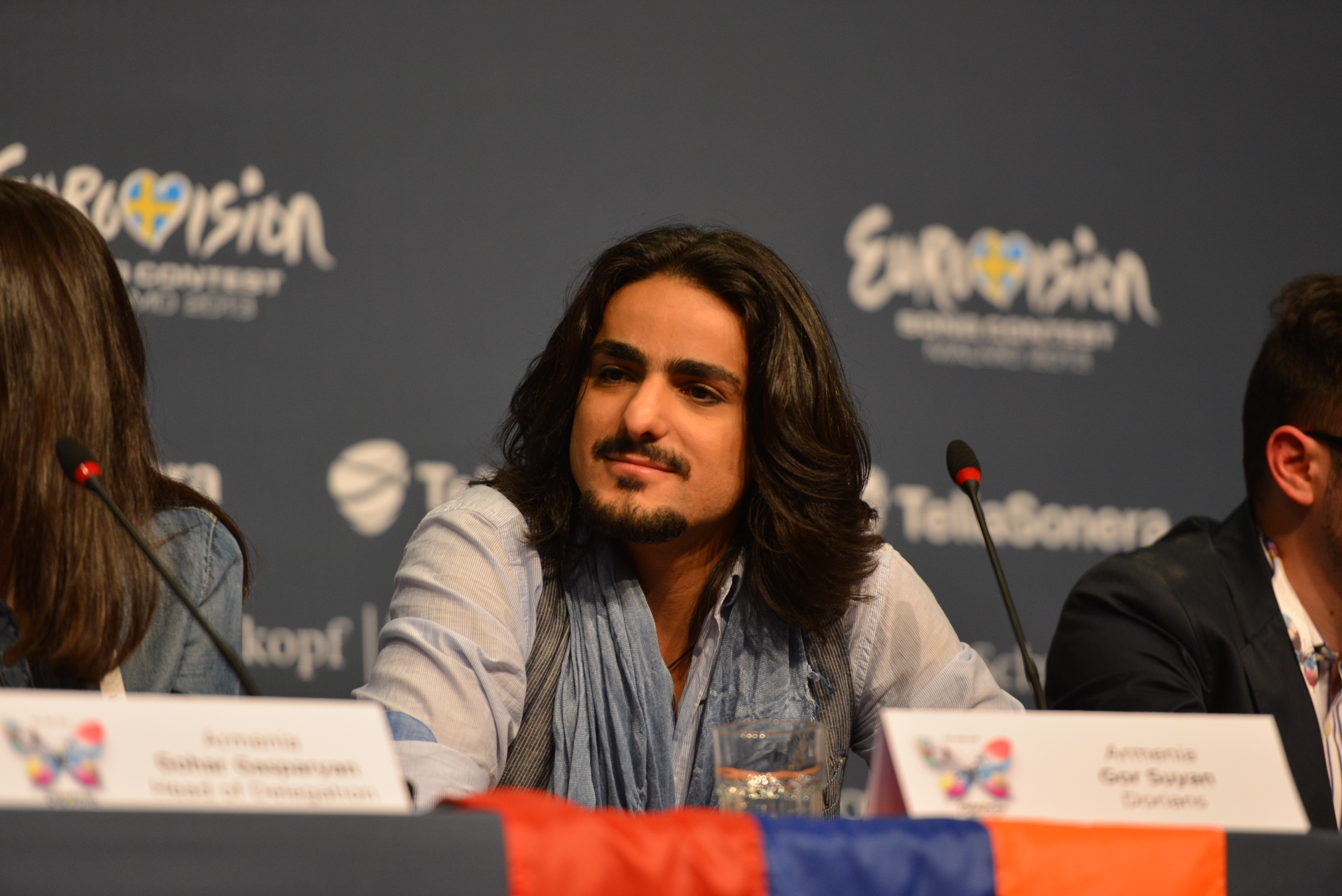
- Gor Sujyan at ESC2013 press conference

Background information
- Born: 25 July 1987 (age 39); Yerevan, Armenian SSR
- Genre: Rock
- Instruments: Vocals, guitar
- Years active: 2008–
- Member of: Dorians

Gor Mkrtchi Sujyan (Armenian: Գոռ Մկրտչի Սուջյան; born 25 July 1987) is an Armenian rock singer and lead singer of the Armenian rock band Dorians. He represented Armenia in the Eurovision Song Contest 2013 in Malmö, Sweden, with the song Lonely Planet.

== Biography ==
=== Early life ===
Gor Sujyan was born on 25 July 1987 in Yerevan, Armenia. He is the son of guitarist, jazzman Mkrtich Sujyan.

=== Dorians ===
At the age of 17, Gor has created band "Gor & Friends". It has been performing cover-version of popular rock songs. Since June 2008 – lead singer and main composer of a new rock band Dorians. In April 2009 Dorians won the "Best Newcomer" award at the annual Tashir Music Awards in Moscow.

On 22 December 2011, the band presented their first album named "Fly".

=== Eurovision ===
At the Eurovision Song Contest 2010, Gor was one of the back-up singers for Eva Rivas during her performance of "Apricot Stone."

On 21 January 2013, it was announced by ARMTV, that Gor would represent Armenia at the Eurovision Song Contest 2013, held in Malmö, Sweden. He sang the song "Lonely Planet", written by legendary Tony Iommi, the English guitarist and songwriter, a founder member of the pioneering heavy metal band Black Sabbath and Armenian lyricist Vardan Zadoyan. On 16 May, "Lonely Planet" competed in the second semi-final, and qualified to the finals, placing 7th in a field of 17 songs and scoring 69 points. In the final, the song placed 18th with 41 points.

== Awards ==
- 2009 – Best Newcomer (Dorians) WON
- 2010 – Best Male Singer (Gor Sujyan) WON
- 2010 – Best Rock Band of the Year (Dorians) WON
- 2011 – Best Rock Band of the Year (Dorians) WON
- 2011 – Best Video of the Year (Dorians) WON
- 2011 – Best Vocal of the Year (Gor Sujyan) WON
- 2011 – Rock Number One (Dorians) WON
- 2011 – Man Number One (Gor Sujyan) WON

== Television ==
Year	Title	Role	Notes
2013	Eurovision Song Contest 2013	Singer	

Awards and achievements
Preceded by Emmy with "Boom Boom"	Armenia in the Eurovision Song Contest; 2013	Succeeded by Aram Mp3 with "Not Alone"
