= Lusine Aghabekyan =

Armenian-American singer-songwriter

Lucy
- Born: Lusine Aghabekyan; 1990 (age 35–36); Kamaris, Armenian SSR, Soviet Union
- Genres: Pop; R&B; soul
- Occupations: Singer; songwriter
- Years active: 2006–present

Lusine Aghabekyan (Armenian: Լուսինե Աղաբեկյան), better known as simply Lucy, is an Armenian singer and songwriter. In December 2007, Lusine became the winner of the second edition of Hay Superstar, which is the Armenian version of the British television hit show Pop Idol.

== Life and career ==
=== Early life ===
At the age of 9 she attended to the vocal classes of music studio “Akunq” in Abovyan. Lucy graduated from the Yerevan state college of pop and jazz art, after then — from the Yerevan Komitas State Conservatory.

=== 2006-2007: Hay Superstar ===
In 2006, Lusine became a contestant on season two of Hay Superstar, the Armenian version of Pop Idol. During the final her runner up was Nare Gevorgyan, but she won the contest. Also, later in 2007 she won the second place in the international contest "The song of the sea", in Ukraine.

=== 2008-2009 ===
In 2008 she took the first place in another international contest “The Golden Voice” in Moldova and became the Best New Artist on Radio Van’s music awards “Voske Qnar” in Armenia. She released her first and only album called “Achqeris Khorqum” (“Deep in my eyes”) in 2009.

=== 2015 ===
In the beginning of 2015 her song “Turn Around” announced the Best Song of December 2015 during the Van Music Awards.

=== 2016: Depi Evratesil ===
In the summer of 2016, an audio version of the single "Go-Go!" was released. The song was written and produced by DerHova.

In October, Lucy was announced as a participant in Depi Evratesi, the Armenian national selection to find their entrant in the Eurovision Song Contest 2017. During her time on the show, she was a member of Aram MP3's team. She was eliminated from the contest on December 10, the day of semi-final 1.
