= Hay Superstar =

Armenian television series

- Armenian: Հայ Սուպերսթար
- Created by: Simon Fuller
- Starring: Michael Poghosyan; Naira Gurjinyan
- Country of origin: Armenia
- No. of seasons: 5

Original release
- Network: Shant TV
- Release: March 2006 – 12 October 2025

Finalists (with dates of elimination)

Season 1 (2006)
Susanna Petrosyan	Winner
Anna Avetyan	July 30
Mihran Tsarukyan	Disqualified
Lilit Hovhannisyan	July 5
Astghik Safaryan	June 26
Narek Gevorgyan	June 19
Mariam Movsisyan	June 12
Narine Davtyan	June 5
Emilia Zaqaryan	May 29
Tatevik Hayrapetyan	May 22
Lilit Ter-Vardanyan	May 15

Season 2 (2006–07)
Lusine Aghabekyan	Winner
Nare Gevorgyan	April 8
Hasmik Papyan	March 19
Jivan Khachatryan	March 12
Heghine Shahumyan	March 5
Anna Kostanyan	February 26
Hayk Martirosyan	February 19
Suzanna Ghazaryan	February 5
Grigor Kyokchyan	January 29
Seda Hoinanyan	January 22
Liana Margaryan	January 15
Marina Kartashyan	December 25
Tigran Hovhannisyan	December 25

Season 3 (2007–08)
Hayk Harutyunyan	Winner
Anahit Manasyan	April 7
Sevak Xachatryan	March 25
Diana Ser-Manukyan	March 18
Hakob Chobanyan	March 11
Meri Kopushyan	February 25
Luse Saxatelyan	February 11
Ani Berberyan	February 4
Narine Dovlatyan	January 28
Diana Grigoryan	January 28
Siranush Manwelyan	January 21
Tatevik Poghosyan	January 21
Tatevik Anesyan	January 14
Viktoria Arutyunyan	January 14

Season 4 (2009–10)
Raffi Ohanian	Winner
Raysa Avanessian	14 March
Suren Arustamyan	1 March
Gor Harutunyan	22 February
Iveta Mukuchyan	15 February
Hayk Petrosyan	8 February
Mariam Avetisyan	1 February
Pareli Amirxanyan	25 January
Eva Khazaryan	18 January
Yulya Zakarian	28 December
Anna Dovlatian	21 December
Meline Apoyan	21 December
Senik Barseghyan	14 December
Syuzanna Melqonyan	14 December

Hay Superstar (Armenian: Հայ Սուպերսթար, literally "Armenian Superstar") is the Armenian version of the original British format Pop Idol, part of the Idol franchise. It was a talent contest to find the best young singer in Armenia.

== Summary ==
Season	Year	Winner	Runner-up
One	2006	Susanna Petrosyan	Anna Avetyan
Two	2006–2007	Lusine Aghabekyan	Nare Gevorgyan
Three	2007–2008	Lucy Harutunyan	Anahit Manasyan
Four	2009–2010	Raffi Ohanian	Raisa Avanessian
Five	2011	Sona Rubenyan	Ervand Matevosyan

== History ==
Auditions were held in Gyumri, Vanadzor, Stepanakert, Nagorno-Karabakh, and Yerevan. The panel of judges for the show consists of Michael Poghosyan, Egor Glumov and Naira Gurjianyan.

The first season was aired on Shant TV from March to late July 2006; the second season aired from November 2006 to early April 2007. Season 3 ran exactly one year later. After a break of one year, the competition returned with a fourth season from November 2009 to March 2010. The fifth and final season aired from October 2011 to April 2012.

== Season 1 (2006) ==
The first season of Hay Superstar was won by Susanna Petrosyan. Anna Avetyan was the runner-up. Mihran Tsarukyan, who was among the final two contestants, was eliminated on suspicion of having manipulated the televote in his favor. The elimination rounds went on from March to July 2006.

Participants and dates of elimination

- Susanna Petrosyan - Winner
- Anna Avetyan - July 30, 2006
- Mihran Tsarukyan - July 23, 2006 (to leave voluntarily)
- Lilit Hovhannisyan - July 3, 2006
- Mariam Movsisyan - June 12, 2006
- Narine Davtyan - June 5, 2006
- Emilia Zaqaryan - May 29, 2006
- Tatevik Hayrapetyan - May 22, 2006
- Lilit Ter-Vardanyan - May 15, 2006

Elimination chart:

Date	Bottom Three		
May 15	Lilit Ter-Vardanyan		
May 22	Tatevik Hayrapetyan		
May 29	Emilia Zaqaryan	Narek Gevorgyan	Astghik Safaryan
June 5	Narine Davtyan	Anna Avetyan	Mariam Movsisyan
June 12	Mariam Movsisyan (2)	Narek Gevorgyan (2)	Anna Avetyan (2)
June 19	Narek Gevoryan (3)	Mihran Tsarukyan	Lilit Hovhannisyan
June 26	Astghik Safaryan	Lilit Hovhannisyan (2)	Susanna Petrosyan
July 3	Lilit Hovhannisyan (3)		
July 10	Anna Avetyan (3)		
June 17	Anna Avetyan (4)	Susanna Petrosyan	

== Season 2 (2006–2007) ==
The second season was broadcast starting 20 November 2006, with eliminations starting on Christmas Day of that same year. The final was on 8 April 2007. The winner was Lusine Aghabekyan, with Nare Gevorgyan runner-up and Hasmik Papyan third.

Participants and date of elimination

- Lusine Aghabekyan - Winner
- Nare Gevorgyan - April 8, 2007
- Hasmik Papyan - March 19, 2007
- Jivan Khachatryan - March 12, 2007
- Heghine Shahumyan - March 5, 2007
- Anna Kostanyan - February 26, 2007
- Hayk Martirosyan - February 19, 2007
- Suzanna Ghazaryan - February 5, 2007
- Grigor Kyokchyan - January 29, 2007
- Seda Hoinanyan - January 22, 2007
- Liana Margaryan - January 15, 2007
- Marina Kartashyan - December 25, 2006
- Tigran Hovhannisyan - December 25, 2006

Themes:
December 25: Beatles Songs
January 15: Last Decade Hits
January 22: Russian Songs
January 29: Armenian Patriotism
February 5: Love Songs
February 19: 70s Hits
February 26: Armenian 80s Hits
March 5: Pop & Rock Songs
March 12: Armenian Classics
March 19: Solos & Duets
March 26: Final

Legend
Did Not Perform	Female	Male	Semi	Finalists	Winner

Safe	First Save	Second Save	Last Save	Eliminated

Stage:		Semi-Finals				WC	Finals										
Week:		11/20	11/27	12/04	12/11	12/18	12/25	01/14	01/22	01/29	02/05	02/19	02/26	03/05	03/12	03/19	03/26
Place	Contestants	Results															
1	Lusine Aghabekyan				Elim	2nd											Winner
2	Nare Gevorgyan	1st															Runner-up
3	Hasmik Papyan				1st			Btm 3				Btm 3	Btm 2	Btm 3		Elim	
4	Jivan Khachtryan			Elim		1st							Btm 3	Btm 3	Elim		
5	Heghine Shahumyan				2nd		Btm 3	Btm 4		Btm 2				Elim			
6	Anna Kostanyan		Elim			Adv			Btm 3		Btm 3	Btm 2	Elim				
7	Hayk Mrtirosyan		1st				Btm 4		Btm 2		Btm 2	Elim					
8	Suzanna Ghazaryan		2nd					Btm 3		Btm 3	Elim						
9	Grigor Kyokchyan			2nd						Elim							
10	Seda Hoinanyan			Elim		Adv			Elim								
11	Liana Margaryan			1st				Elim									
12-13	Tigran Hovhannisyan	2nd					Elim										
12-13	Marina Kartashyan	Elim				Adv	Elim										

== Season 3 (2007–2008) ==
The third season of Hay Superstar was broadcast on 1 December 2007 with the finals broadcast on April 7, 2008. The winner was Lucy Harutunyan.

Participants and dates of elimination

- Lucy Harutunyan - Winner
- Anahit Manasyan - April 7, 2008
- Sevak Xachatryan - March 25, 2008
- Diana Ser-Manukyan - March 18, 2008
- Hakob Chobanyan - March 11, 2008
- Meri Kopushyan - February 25, 2008
- Luse Saghatelyan - February 11, 2008
- Ani Berberyan - February 4, 2008
- Narine Dovlatyan - January 28, 2008
- Diana Grigoryan - January 28, 2008
- Siranush Manwelyan - January 21, 2008
- Tatevik Poghosyan - January 21, 2008
- Tatevik Anesyan - January 14, 2008
- Viktoria Arutyunyan - January 14, 2008

Themes:
January 14: Modern Pop Songs
January 21: Russian Songs
January 28: Armenian 70 & 80s Hits
February 4: N/A
February 11: N/A
February 25: Duets with Armenian Stars
March 11: National Songs of Ashughs
March 18: N/A
March 25: N/A
April 7: Final

Elimination chart:

Stage:		Semi-Finals				WC	Finals									
Week:		12/1	12/8	12/15	12/22	12/29	01/14	01/21	01/28	02/04	02/11	02/25	03/11	03/18	03/25	04/07
Place	Contestants	Results														
1	Lucy Harutunyan				IN											Winner
2	Anahit Manasyan		Elim			Adv			Btm 4							Runner-up
3	Sevak Xachatryan		IN							Btm 3		Btm 3	Btm 2		Elim	
4	Diana Ser-Manukyan			IN				Btm 4			Btm 2	Btm 2	Btm 3	Elim		
5	Hakob Chobanyan				Elim	1st			Btm 3	Btm 2			Elim			
6	Meri Kopushyan		IN								Btm 3	Elim				
7	Luse Saghatelyan	IN						Btm 2			Elim					
8	Ani Berberyan				Elim	Adv				Elim						
9-10	Diana Grigoryan			IN			Btm 4		Elim							
9-10	Narine Dovlatyan				IN				Elim							
11-12	Tatevik Poghosyan			Elim		Adv		Elim								
11-12	Siranuysh Manvelyan	Elim				Adv	Btm 3	Elim								
13-14	Tatevik Avanesyan	IN					Elim									
13-14	Viktoria Harutyunyan		Elim			2nd	Elim									

== Season 4 (2009–2010) ==
After broadcasts were suspended for a full year, Hay Superstar returned for a fourth season by the late 2000s. The first broadcast was on 9 November 2009 and elimination rounds started on 14 December 2009. The season ended in March 2010.

List of participants eliminated with dates of elimination

- Raffi Ohanian - Winner
- Raysa Avanesyan - 14 March 2010
- Suren Arustamyan - 1 March 2010
- Gor Harutunyan - 22 February 2010
- Iveta Mukuchyan - 15 February 2010
- Hayk Petrosyan - 8 February 2010
- Mariam Avetisyan - 1 February 2010
- Pareli Amirxanyan - 25 January 2010
- Eva Khazaryan - 18 January 2010
- Yulya Zakarian - 28 December 2009
- Anna Dovlatian - 21 December 2009
- Meline Apoyan - 21 December 2009
- Senik Barseghyan - 14 December 2009
- Syuzanna Melqonyan - 14 December 2009

Themes:
December 14: N/A
December 21: 80 & 90s Hits
December 28: Elvis Presley and The Beatles songs
January 18: Pop rock
January 25: Patriotic songs
February 1: N/A
February 8: Armenian rock and pop-rock
February 15: Love Day
February 22: Armenian Variety Art & Folk Songs

Elimination chart

Legend
Did Not Perform	Female	Male	Semi	Finalists	Winner

Safe	First Save	Second Save	Last Save	Eliminated

Stage:		Semi-Finals			WC	Finals										
Week:		11/09	11/16	11/23	11/30	12/14	12/21	12/28	01/18	01/25	02/01	02/08	02/15	02/22	03/01	03/14
Place	Contestant	Result														
1	Raffi Ohanian		IN												Btm 2	Winner
2	Raysa Avanessian		IN										Btm 2	Btm 2		Runner-up
3	Suren Arustamyan			IN			Elim^{1}					Btm 3	Btm 3	Btm 3	Elim	
4	Gor Harutunyan	IN												Elim		
5	Iveta Mukuchyan			Elim	Adv		Btm 4	Btm 3	Btm 3		Btm 3	Btm 2	Elim			
6	Hayk Petrosyan			IN		Btm 3				Btm 2	Btm 3	Elim				
7	Mariam Avetisyan		IN				Btm 4			Elim^{2}	Elim					
8	Pareli Amirxanyan			Elim	Adv			Btm 4	Btm 3	WD						
9	Eva Khazaryan	IN						Btm 2	Elim							
10	Yulya Zakarian			Elim	1st			Elim								
11	Anna Dovlatian	Elim			Adv		WD									
12	Meline Apoyan	IN					Elim									
13-14	Senik Barseghyan		Elim		Adv	Elim										
13-14	Syuzanna Melqonyan			IN		Elim										

- After it was announced that Meline Apoyan and Suren Arustamyan were voted out, Anna quit the show by her own decision. So, Suren returned to the show according to the decision of 2 members of the jury, Naira Gyurjinyan and Egor Glumov, and the producer Andre Simonyan.
- After the announcement that Mariam Avetisyan was voted out, Pareli quit the show due to personal problems in Iran. Mariam returned to the show by decision of the producers' staff.

== Season 5 (2011) ==
After broadcasts were suspended for a full year, Hay Superstar returned for a fifth season in October 2011. Audition rounds started being broadcast on 16 October 2011.

The live shows were broadcast on Sundays at 20:10 and there were three weekly diary shows on Tuesdays, Thursdays and Saturdays at 16:45.

The jury for season 5 were singer-songwriters André and Leila Saribekyan, presenter Avet Barseghyan and actor, writer, director producer Garik Papoyan.

Elimination chart

Legend
Did Not Perform	Female	Male	Semi	Finalists	Winner

Safe	First Save	Last Save	Eliminated

Stage:		Semi-Finals			WC	Finals									
Week:		12/18/11	12/25/11	01/15/12	01/22/12	02/19/12	02/26/12	03/04/12	03/11/12	03/18/12	03/25/12	04/01/12	04/08/12	04/15/12	04/29/12
Place	Contestant	Result													
1	Sona Rubenyan		1st								Btm 2			Btm 2	Winner
2	Ervand Matevosyan	2nd													Runner-up
3	Arthur Matsakyan			Elim	2nd						Btm 3		Btm 2	Elim	
4	Araksya Amirkhanyan		Jury									Btm 2	Elim		
5	Julieta Sargsyan	Elim			1st					Btm 2		Elim			
6	Anahit Harutyunyan	Jury				Btm 3	Btm 2	Btm 2	Btm 2	Btm 3	Elim				
7	Rima Farsyan			Elim	Jury				Btm 3	Elim					
8	Elizabet Adikyan			Jury			Btm 3	Btm 3	Elim						
9	Liana Aroyan		2nd					Elim							
10	Armen Mardanyan			1st			Elim								
11-12	Lilit Khachatryan			2nd		Elim									
11-12	Vardine Avagyan	1st				Elim									
Wild; Card	Arlin Gharibyan			Elim	Elim										
Wild; Card	Gayane Avdalyan	Elim			Elim										
Wild; Card	Margarita Mnatsakanyan	Elim			Elim										
Wild; Card	Ovsanna Khublaryan	Elim			Elim										
Wild; Card	Suren Poghosov	Elim			Elim										
Semi- Final 3	Aida Qalantaryan			Elim											
Semi- Final 3	Bejan Vardanyan			Elim											
Semi- Final 2	Ani Hovhannisyan		Elim												
Semi- Final 2	Arevik Karapetyan		Elim												
Semi- Final 2	Armen Javalyan		Elim												
Semi- Final 2	Gourgen Sayadyan		Elim												
Semi- Final 2	Tamara Khachatryan		Elim												

== References in popular media ==
Moe Szyslak of The Simpsons referenced Hay Superstar as "Armenian Idol" and mentioned Egor Glumov in episode 23 of season 21, titled "Judge Me Tender", which aired on May 23, 2010.

== See also ==
- X Factor (Armenian TV series)
