= Dorians (band) =

Armenian rock band

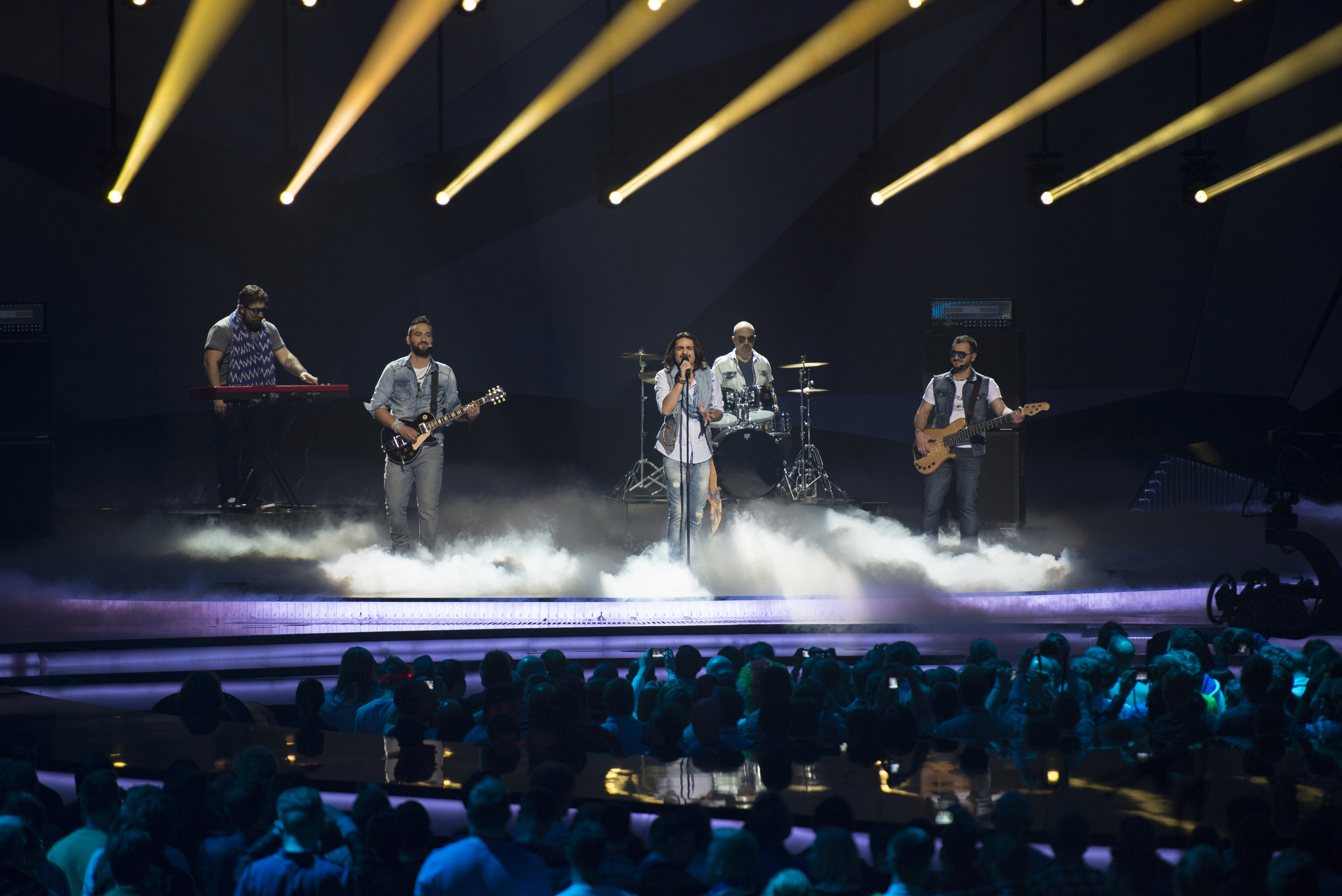
- Dorians performing at the Eurovision Song Contest 2013 (from left to right: Arman Pahlevanyan, Gagik Khodavirdi, Gor Sujyan, Arman Jalalyan, and Edgar Sahakyan)

Background information
- Origin: Yerevan, Armenia
- Genres: Rock
- Years active: 2008–present
- Label: Dorians Production
- Members: Gor Sujyan (singer); Gagik Khodavirdi (guitar); Arman Pahlevanyan (keyboard); Edgar Sahakyan (bass guitar); Arman Jalalyan (drums)

Dorians (Armenian: Դորիանս) is an Armenian rock band founded in June 2008 by Vahagn Gevorgyan. In February 2009 the band participated at the first qualifying round of the international Eurovision Song Contest, which brought popularity to the band.

In 2013 Dorians represented Armenia in the Eurovision Song Contest 2013 in Malmö.

== History ==
In April 2009 Dorians won the "Best Newcomer" award at the annual Tashir Music Awards in Moscow. In June of the same year, the band performed its first big concert celebrating its one-year anniversary in Yerevan.

Meeting legendary musicians Ian Gillan (Deep Purple) and Tony Iommi (Black Sabbath) the band Dorians had a charity concert within the frame of the project Rock Aid Armenia and provided the profit to the reconstruction of a music school in Gyumri, Armenia.

In November 2010 the band performed four solo concerts in Moscow. During the same year the band was announced as the "Best Rock Band of the Year" at the National Music Awards of Armenia. In 2011 Dorians won the "Best Rock Band of the Year", the "Best Video of the Year" and the "Best Vocal of the Year" awards at the National Music Awards of Armenia.

In April 2011 the band recorded its first album, the mixing of which was done in Brussels, Belgium at the "ICP" Studios, the mastering was done at the "Translab" mastering studio in Paris, France. In August 2011 Dorians was invited to perform at the opening act of Serj Tankian's (System of a Down) concert in Yerevan.

On 13 December 2011 the band won the "Rock Number One" and the "Man Number One" awards at the radio award VAN Music Awards 2011.

On 22 December 2011 the band Dorians presented their first album named "Fly". On 10 September 2012 at the Sports and Concerts Complex after Karen Demirchyan and on 13 September 2012 at the Nagorno-Karabakh the band Dorians had a concert with keyboard player Derek Sherinian, along with special guest Glenn Hughes.

In 2013 Dorians represented Armenia in the Eurovision Song Contest 2013, with the song "Lonely Planet". The song went to compete in the second semi-final on 16 May 2013, and qualified for the final, placing 7th with a total of 69 points, receiving 12 points from France. In the final, Armenia placed 18 in a field of 26 songs, with a score of 41 points.

== Band members ==
=== Current members ===
(All 2008–present)

- Gor Sujyan – lead vocals
- Gagik "Gagas" Khodavirdi – lead guitar
- Arman Pahlevanyan – keyboards
- Edgar Sahakyan – bass
- Arman Jalalyan – drums, percussion

== Discography ==
Albums:

- 2011: Fly

Awards and achievements
Preceded by Emmy with "Boom Boom"	Armenia in the Eurovision Song Contest; 2013	Succeeded by Aram Mp3 with "Not Alone"
