= Vrezh Kirakosyan =

Armenian singer (born 1983)

Vrezh Kirakosyan Վրեժ Կիրակոսյան
- Born: 1983 (age 41–42)
- Origin: Armenia
- Instrument: Vocals
- Years active: 2010–present
- Labels: Sony Armenia

Vrezh Kirakosyan (in Armenian Վրեժ Կիրակոսյան) (born in 1983) is an Armenian singer who won the first series (2010–2011) of the Armenian X-Factor series (in Armenian Իքս-Ֆակտոր) after getting top votes in the final broadcast live on the Armenian Shant TV station on 15 May 2011, against rival finalist and runner-up Srbuhi Sargsyan.

Title holder Kirakosyan competed in the "over 25" category and was mentored by judge Gisané Palyan. As a result of his victory, he has a contract with Sony for two singles in addition to filming of a music video for his winning song.
