= Hayko =

Armenian singer (1973–2021)

Hayko Հայկո
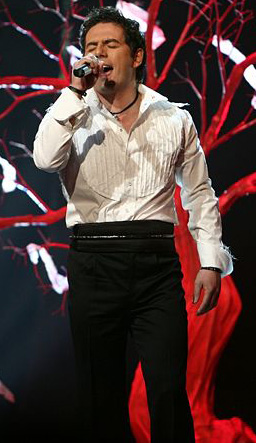
- Hayko in 2007

Background information
- Born: 25 August 1973; Yerevan, Armenian SSR, Soviet Union
- Died: 29 September 2021 (aged 48) Yerevan, Armenia
- Genres: Pop, romance
- Occupations: Musician, songwriter, producer
- Instruments: Vocals, piano
- Years active: 1996–2021

Hayk Borisi "Hayko" Hakobyan (Armenian: Հայկ Բորիսի "Հայկո" Հակոբյան; 25 August 1973 – 29 September 2021) was an Armenian singer and songwriter.

== Biography ==
Hayko was born on 25 August 1973 in Yerevan, Armenia (then part of the Soviet Union). He studied at Yerevan Secondary School No. 170, then in Secondary School No. 32 named after Hovhannes Tumanyan. In 1987, he graduated from the Yerkhani Chukhachyan Music School and was admitted to R. Melikyan Music College.

He started his music career in 1996 with his first song Love (Armenian: Սեր).

He won Armenia's national selection for the Eurovision Song Contest 2007 in Helsinki. He represented Armenia in the Eurovision Song Contest in the final with the song "Anytime You Need". The song placed eighth in the contest.

== Musical career ==
- In 1996, Hayko participated in the "Moskva 96" ("Moscow 96") festival; awarded First Prize.
- In 1997, he won the 1st prize at the "Big Apple" festival in New York City.
- In 1998, he was acknowledged as "The Best Author – Performer" at the "Ayo" Author's Competition.
- In 1999, he was nominated for "The Best Singer" award.
- In 1999, he recorded his first CD called "Romance", which represented the well-known Armenian "city" songs with a new and fresh interpretation.
- In 2002, he was nominated in different categories at the Armenian Music Awards (The Best Singer, The Best Project and The Best Album) and this year became exceptional in his career. He won in all three nominations.
- In 2003, he got an Award at the "Armenian National Music Awards" for "The best DVD".
- In 2003, he gave his first solo concert at the "Alex Theatre" in the United States.
- On 27 May 2003, he gave a solo performance in Yerevan and recorded a DVD called "Live Concert"
- In 2003, he recorded his first author's CD called "Norits" ("Again").
- He was recognized as the Best Singer 2003 and 2006 at the Armenian National Music Awards.
- He entered the Eurovision Song Contest 2007 for Armenia with the song "Anytime You Need".
- In 2007, he won in the Best Pop Contemporary Album and the Best Album Cover & Design categories at the Armenian Music Awards.

== Death ==
Hayko, who had cancer, died on 29 September 2021, in Yerevan after contracting COVID-19 during the COVID-19 pandemic in Armenia. He was 48.

== Discography ==
- Romance (2000)
- Norits (2004)
- Live Concert (2004)
- With One Word (2007)
- Live Concert 2008 (2008)
- Es Qez Siraharvel Em (2014)
- Hayko Live Concert (2018)
- Amena (2020)

Awards and achievements
Preceded by André with "Without Your Love"	Armenia in the Eurovision Song Contest; 2007	Succeeded by Sirusho with "Qélé, Qélé"
