= Malishka =

Malishka Մալիշկա
- Village; Rural Community
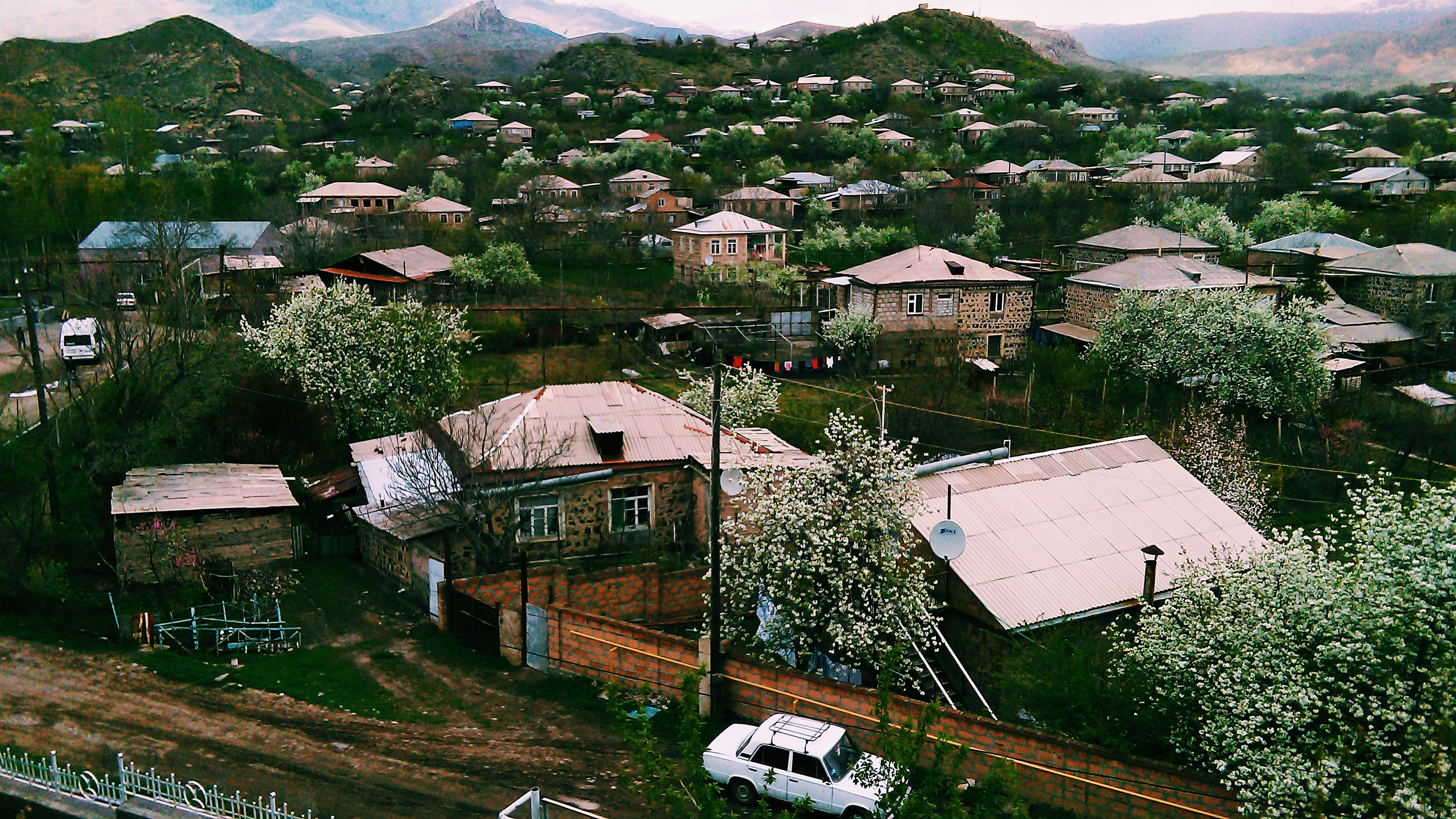
- A view of Malishka

- Location within Armenia Location within Vayots Dzor
- Coordinates: 39°44′13″N 45°23′15″E
- Country: Armenia
- Province: Vayots Dzor
- Municipality: Yeghegnadzor

Area
  - Total: 86 km^{2} (33 sq mi)

Population (2011)
  - Total: 4,460
- Time zone: UTC+4 (AMT)

Malishka can be a feminine given name but is more commonly known as a place.

Malishka (Armenian: Մալիշկա) is a village and rural municipal community of the Yeghegnadzor Municipality of the Vayots Dzor Province of Armenia.

== Economy ==
Almost all of the population lives by subsistence farming. The only other places of employment in the village are the two village schools, the two kindergartens, or one of the many "khanuts" (shops).

== Education ==
Peace Corps volunteers have been active in Malishka, having taught English and holding after-school English clubs at Malishka Secondary School no. 1.

== Historical and Cultural Monuments ==
The ruins of ancient Moz town are located 3–4 km southeast of the village of Malishka, on a 1,200 meter high hill above the right bank of the Arpa River. The town was destroyed by an earthquake and volcanic eruption in the year of 735.

The village also features with st. Gevorg church (1850), a 7th century castle, cross-stones of the 9-14th centuries. The medieval fortresses "Berdajur" and "Ahekaberd" are located in the vicinity of the village, and 1.5 km east, there is a bridge of the 18th century.

== Notable people ==
- Narine Dovlatyan, jazz singer and actress
- Ara Abramyan, prominent philanthropist, social activist, and businessmen

== Gallery ==
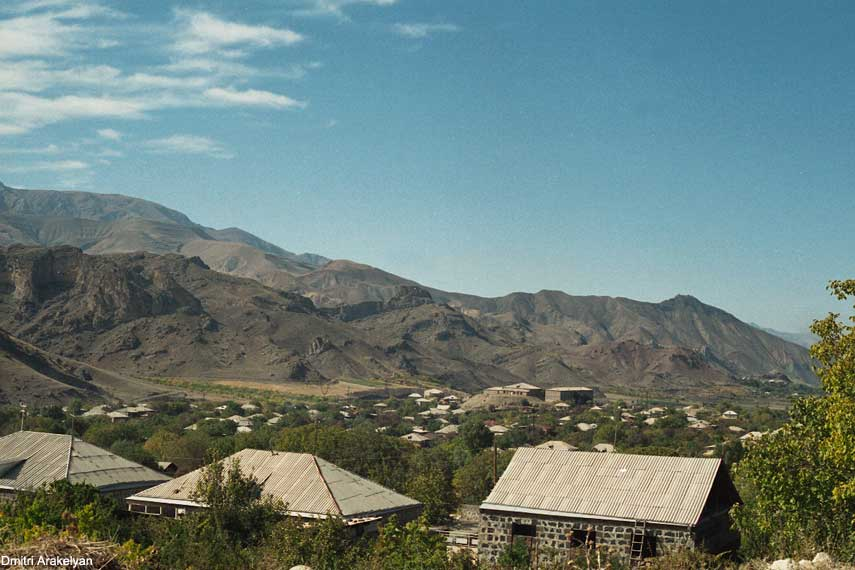
A view of the village

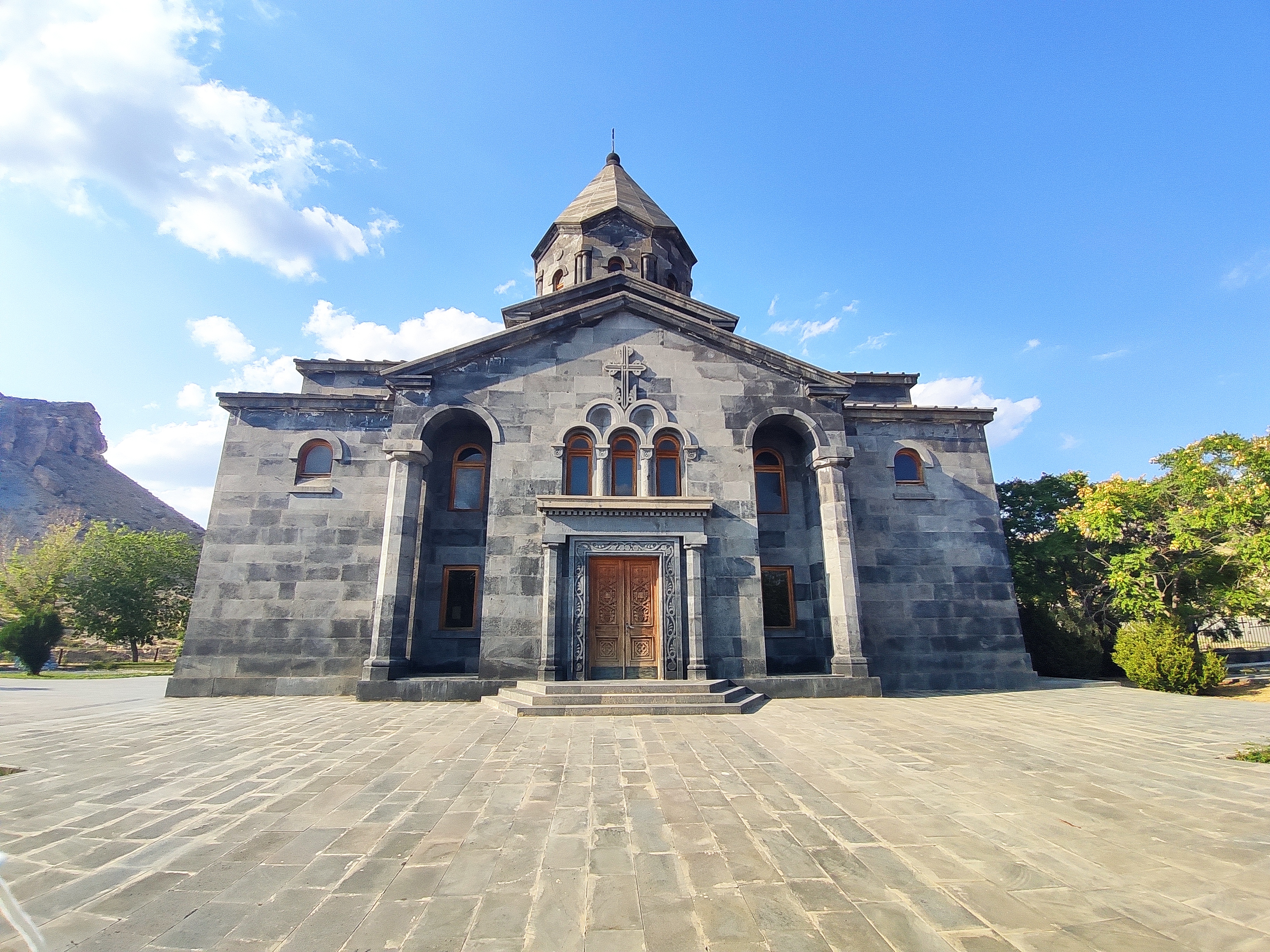
St. Anna church in Malishka

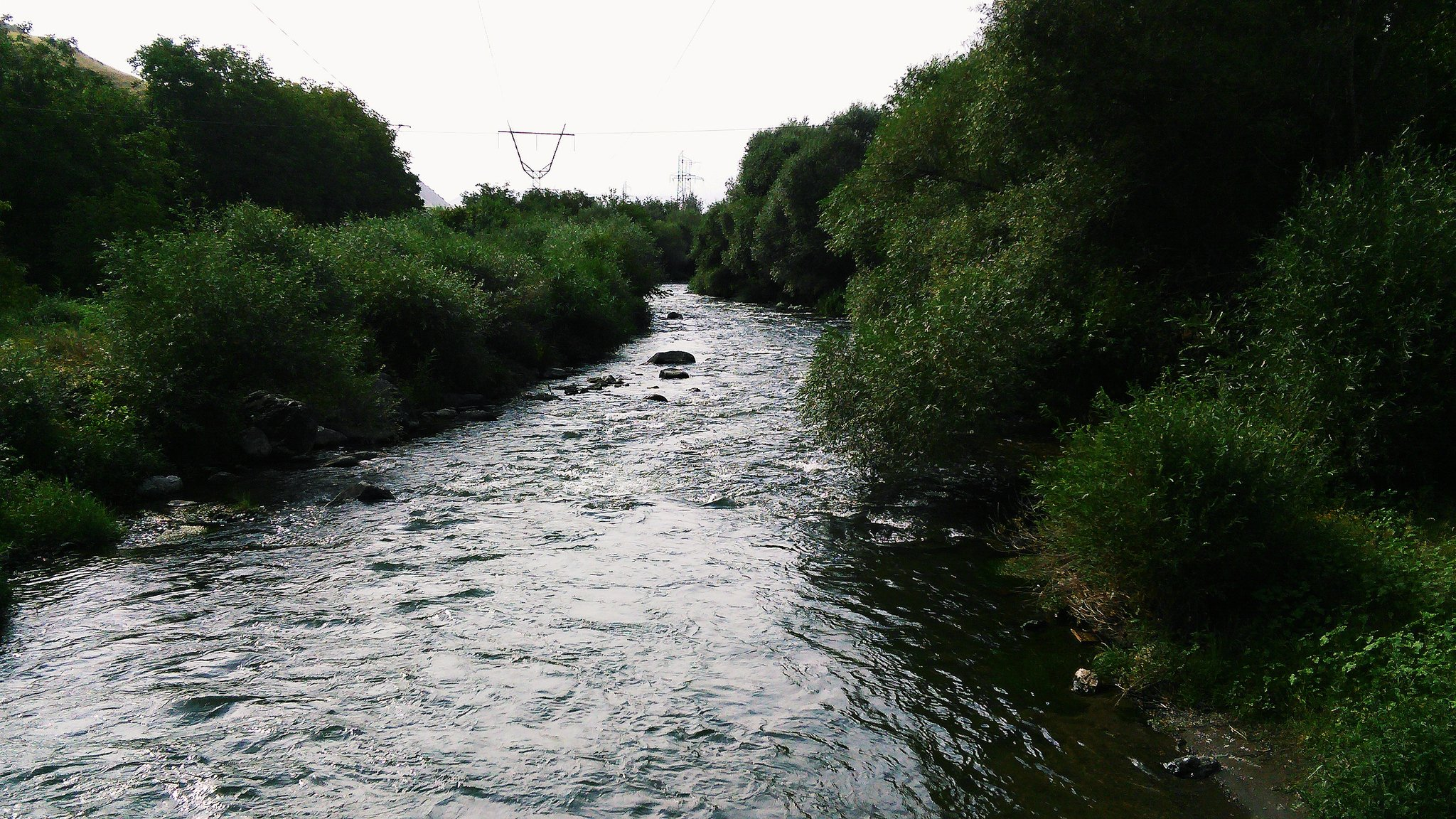
Malishka River
