= X Factor (Armenian TV series) =

Armenian music competition television series

- Logo
- Armenian: Իքս-ֆակտոր
- Created by: Simon Cowell
- Presented by: Aram Mp3 (2010-13); Grisha Aghakhanyan (2014-); Avet Barseghyan (2014-)
- Judges: Garik Papoyan (2010-); André (2012–); Egor Glumov (2010-11, 2014); Emmy (2014); Naira Gyurjinyan (2010-13); Gisané Palyan (2010-13); Erik Karapetyan (2016-2017); Shushanik Arevshatyan (2016-2017)
- Original language: Armenian
- No. of seasons: 4

Original release
- Network: Shant TV
- Release: 6 November 2010 – 9 April 2017

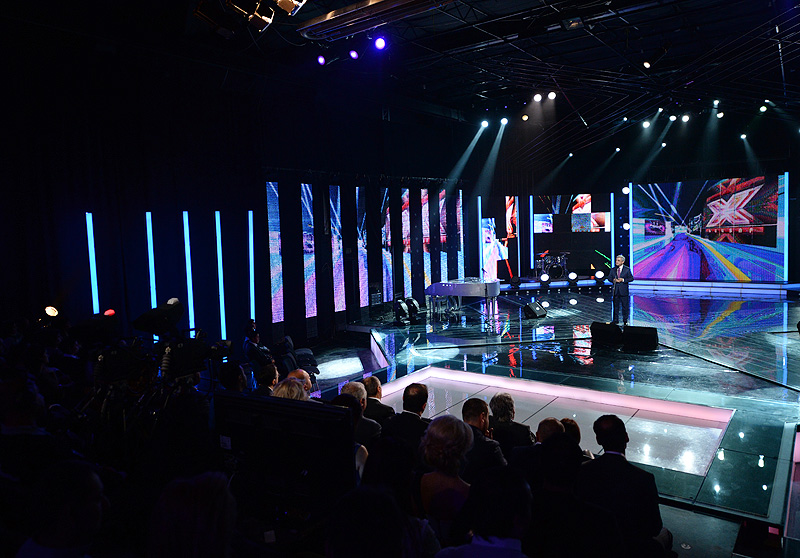
2014

X-Factor (Armenian: Իքս-Ֆակտոր) is the Armenian adaptation of the British television music talent show The X Factor. It is a televised music talent show featuring aspiring pop singers who are selected through public auditions held in Armenia and among the Armenian diaspora. In its inaugural year, the show was broadcast on Shant TV, the same station that airs the Armenian Idol series Hay Superstar.

== Series overview ==
Contestant in (or mentor of) "Boys" category
Contestant in (or mentor of) "Girls" category
Contestant in (or mentor of) "Over 25s" category
Contestant in (or mentor of) "Groups" category

| Season | Start | Finish | Winner | Runner-up | Third place | Winning mentor | Judges | Host |
|---|---|---|---|---|---|---|---|---|
| One | 6 November 2010 | 15 May 2011 | Vrezh Kirakosyan | Srbuhi Sargsyan | Gigabeat | Gisané Palyan | Egor Glumov; Garik Papoyan; Gisané Palyan; Naira Gyurjinyan | Aram Mp3 |
| Two | 10 October 2012 | 12 May 2013 | Kim Grigoryan | Armen Yedigaryan | Lena Ghazaryan | Garik Papoyan | André; Garik Papoyan; Gisané Palyan; Naira Gyurjinyan | Aram Mp3 |
| Three | 26 April 2014 | 2 November 2014 | Vahe Margaryan | Narek Vardanyan | Hayk Hunanyan | André | André; Garik Papoyan; Egor Glumov; Emmy | Grisha Aghakhanyan; Avet Barseghyan |
| Four | 9 October 2016 | 9 April 2017 | Edgar Ghandilyan | Inna Sayadyan | Emmanuel & Mariam | André | André; Garik Papoyan; Erik; Shushan Arevshatyan | Grisha Aghakhanyan |

== Judges' categories and their contestants ==
Key:

– Winning judge/category. Winners are in bold, eliminated contestants in small font.

| Season | Egor Glumov | Naira Gyurjinyan | Garik Papoyan | Gisané Palyan |
|---|---|---|---|---|
| One | **Groups**; Gigabeat; P.S. Mars-On | **Boys**; Artsrun Khangeldyan; Arthur-Alek Qosbekian; Vahé Aleksanyan | **Girls**; Srbuhi Sargsyan; Arminé Kocharyan; Nelly Ghazaryan | **Over 25s** **Vrezh Kirakosyan**; Yeva Sujyan; Edvin Sultanyan; Nelly Khosrovyan |
| Season | André | Naira Gyurjinyan | Garik Papoyan | Gisané Palyan |
| Two | **Girls**; Lena Ghazaryan; Marianna Shanoyan; Karina Khachatryan | **Over 25s** Asya Poghosyan; Mihran Petrosyan; Svetlana Voskanyan | **Boys**; **Kim Grigoryan**; Armen Yedigaryan; Gevorg Harutyunyan | **Groups**; International; Diamonds; Storm |
| Season | André | Emmy | Garik Papoyan | Egor Glumov |
| Three | **Boys**; **Vahé Margaryan**; Narek Vardanyan; Hayk Hunanyan; Narek Khachatryan | **Girls**; Zhanna Davtyan; Mary Avetisyan; Anahit Hakobyan; Syuzanna Melqonyan | **Groups**; DaDu (Sona Dunoyan & Hambik Daniel); MiKADO; The Nanos; Arthur and Aram | **Over 24s** Gagik Harutyunyan; Vahé Hovakimyan; Anahit Yengibaryan; Sargis Harutyunyan |
| Season | André | Shushanik Arevshatyan | Garik Papoyan | Erik |
| Four | **Boys**; **Edgar Ghandilyan**; Abraham Khublaryan; Yuri Adamyan; Qerob Hovelyan | **Over 22s** Tyom Hakobyan; David Chakhalyan; Harutyun Hakobyan; Valeria Baltaeva | **Groups**; Emmanuel & Mariam; Alternative; The Steps Band | **Girls**; Inna Sayadyan; Hasmik Karapetyan; Diana Harutyunyan; Mané Baghdasaryan |

== Season 1 (2010-2011) ==
The program was broadcast on Saturday nights at 22:30 with repetitions on Sundays, Mondays and Thursdays. Shant TV also broadcasts various chronicles and updates under the title "Oragir" on Tuesdays, Thursdays and Saturdays at 17:50 local time.

The first auditions were broadcast on Shant TV on 11 November 2010, with the eighth auditions on 25 December 2010.

Naira Gyurjinyan was assigned the Boys (16-25) category, Garik Paboyan the Girls (16-25), Egor Glumov the Groups, and Gisané Palyan the Over 25s.

=== Bootcamp and Judges' houses ===
At bootcamp stage, the candidates that were chosen for Judges' Houses were:

- 16-24 Boys (mentor Naira Gyurjinyan): Artsrun Khangeldyan, Arthur-Alek Tosbekian (born in Lebanon), Georgi Bunyatyan, Vahé Aleksanyan, Hayk Avetisyan, Gevorg Harutyunyan
- 16-24 Girls (mentor Garik Papoyan): Anoush, Arminé Kocharyan, Nelly Ghazaryan, Mariam, Sona, Srbuhi Sargsyan
- Over 25 (mentor Gisané Palyan): Yeva, Edvin, Hayk, Nelly, Sona, Vrezh
- Groups (mentor Egor Glumov): (6 groups) GigaBeat, P.S., Mars-On

At Judges' Houses (broadcast on 29 January and 5 February 2011), only 3 from each of the 4 categories continued on to the live shows. Naira Gyurjiniyan was assisted by Haik, Garik Papoyan by Gor Sujyan, Gisané Palyan by Sargis.

=== Contestants ===
Key:

– Winner
– Runner-up
– Withdrew

| Category (mentor) | Acts | | | |
|---|---|---|---|---|
| Boys (Gyurjinyan) | Arthur-Alek Tosbekian | Artsrun Khangeldyan | Vahé Aleksanyan | |
| Girls (Papoyan) | Arminé Kocharyan | Nelly Ghazaryan | Srbuhi Sargsyan | |
| Over 25s (Palyan) | Edvin Sultanyan | Nelly Khosrovyan | Vrezh Kirakosyan | Yeva Sujyan |
| Groups (Glumov) | GigaBeat | Mars-On | P.S. | |

=== Live shows ===
==== Results summary ====
Contestants' colour key:

| – Mentored by Gyurjinyan (Boys) – Mentored by Papoyan (Girls) – Mentored by Palyan (Over 25s) – Mentored by Glumov (Groups) | – Contestant announced as safe (no particular order) – Contestant in the bottom two and had to perform in the sing-off – Contestant received the fewest public votes and was immediately eliminated (no bottom two) |

| | Week 1 | Week 2 | Week 3 | Week 4 | Week 5 | Week 6 | Week 7 | Week 8 | Week 9 | Semifinal | Final |
|---|---|---|---|---|---|---|---|---|---|---|---|
| Vrezh Kirakosyan | Safe | Safe | Safe | Safe | Safe | Safe | Safe | Safe | Safe | Safe | Winner |
| Srbuhi Sargsyan | Safe | Safe | Safe | Safe | Safe | Safe | Safe | Safe | Safe | Safe | Runner-Up |
| GigaBeat | Bottom two | Safe | Safe | Safe | Safe | 6th | Safe | Safe | Safe | 3rd | Eliminated (Semifinal) |
| Artsrun Khangeldyan | Safe | Safe | Bottom two | Safe | Safe | Safe | 5th | Safe | 4th | Eliminated (Week 9) | |
| Arminé Kocharyan | Safe | Safe | Safe | Safe | Safe | Safe | Safe | 5th | Eliminated (Week 8) | | |
| Yeva Sujyan | Safe | 10th | Safe | Safe | Safe | Safe | 6th | Eliminated (Week 7) | | | |
| Arthur-Alek Tosbekian | Safe | Safe | Safe | Bottom two | Bottom two | 7th | Eliminated (Week 6) | | | | |
| Nelly Ghazaryan | Safe | Safe | Safe | Safe | Bottom two | Eliminated (Week 5) | | | | | |
| Edvin Sultanyan | Not in Live Shows | | Safe | Bottom two | Eliminated (Week 4) | | | | | | |
| P.S. | Safe | Safe | Bottom two | Eliminated (Week 3) | | | | | | | |
| Nelly Khosrovyan | Safe | Safe | Withdrew (Week 2) | | | | | | | | |
| Mars-On | Safe | 11th | Eliminated (Week 2) | | | | | | | | |
| Vahé Aleksanyan | Bottom two | Eliminated (Week 1) | | | | | | | | | |
| Withdrew | None | Nelly Khosrovyan | None | | | | | | | | |
| Bottom two | Vahé Aleksanyan, GigaBeat | Mars-On, Yeya Sujyan | P.S., Artsrun Khangeldyan | Edvin Sultanyan, Arthur-Alek Tosbekian | Nelly Ghazaryan, Arthur-Alek Tosbekian | Arthur-Alek Tosbekian, GigaBeat | Yeva Sujyan, Artsrun Khangeldyan | No bottom two/judges' vote; public votes alone decide who is eliminated. | | | |
| Judges voted to | Save | | | | | | | No bottom two/judges' vote; public votes alone decide who is eliminated. | | | |
| Papoyan's vote | GigaBeat | Yeya Sujyan | Artsrun Khangeldyan | Arthur-Alek Tosbekian | Nelly Ghazaryan | GigaBeat | Yeya Sujyan | No bottom two/judges' vote; public votes alone decide who is eliminated. | | | |
| Glumov's vote | GigaBeat | Mars-On | P.S. | -- | Arthur-Alek Tosbekian | GigaBeat | Artsrun Khangeldyan | No bottom two/judges' vote; public votes alone decide who is eliminated. | | | |
| Gyurjinyan's vote | Vahé Aleksanyan | Mars-On | Artsrun Khangeldyan | Arthur-Alek Tosbekian | Arthur-Alek Tosbekian | Arthur-Alek Tosbekian | Artsrun Khangeldyan | No bottom two/judges' vote; public votes alone decide who is eliminated. | | | |
| Palyan's vote | GigaBeat | Yeva Sujyan | Artsrun Khangeldyan | Edvin Sultanyan | Arthur-Alek Tosbekian | Arthur-Alek Tosbekian | Yeya Sujyan | No bottom two/judges' vote; public votes alone decide who is eliminated. | | | |
| Eliminated | Vahé Aleksanyan; 1 of 4 votes Minority | Mars-On; 2 of 4 votes Deadlock | P.S. 1 of 4 votes Minority | Edvin Sultanyan; 1 of 3 votes Minority | Nelly Ghazaryan; 1 of 4 votes Minority | Arthur-Alek Tosbekian; 2 of 4 votes Deadlock | Yeva Sujyan; 2 of 4 votes Deadlock | Arminé Kocharyan; 5th Place | Artsrun Khangeldyan; 4th Place | GigaBeat; 3rd Place | Srbuhi Sargsyan; Runner-Up |
| Eliminated | Vahé Aleksanyan; 1 of 4 votes Minority | Mars-On; 2 of 4 votes Deadlock | P.S. 1 of 4 votes Minority | Edvin Sultanyan; 1 of 3 votes Minority | Nelly Ghazaryan; 1 of 4 votes Minority | Arthur-Alek Tosbekian; 2 of 4 votes Deadlock | Yeva Sujyan; 2 of 4 votes Deadlock | Arminé Kocharyan; 5th Place | Artsrun Khangeldyan; 4th Place | GigaBeat; 3rd Place | Vrezh Kirakosyan; Winner |

== Season 2 (2012-2013) ==
Garik Papoyan was assigned the Boys category, André the Girls, Gisané Palyan the Groups, and Naira Gyurjinyan the Over 25s.

=== Contestants ===
Key:

– Winner
– Runner-up

| Category (mentor) | Acts | | |
|---|---|---|---|
| Boys (Papoyan) | Armen Yedigaryan | Gevorg Harutyunyan | Kim Grigoryan |
| Girls (André) | Karina Khachatryan | Lena Ghazaryan | Marianna Shanoyan |
| Over 25s (Gyurjinyan) | Asya Poghosyan | Mihran Petrosyan | Svetlana Voskanyan |
| Groups (Palyan) | Diamonds | International | Storm |

=== Live shows ===
==== Results summary ====
Contestants' colour key:

| – Mentored by Papoyan (Boys) – Mentored by André (Girls) – Mentored by Gyurjinyan (Over 25s) – Mentored by Palyan (Groups) | – Contestant announced as safe (no particular order) – Contestant in the bottom two and had to perform in the sing-off – Contestant received the fewest public votes and was immediately eliminated (no bottom two) |

| | Week 1 | Week 2 | Week 3 | Week 4 | Week 5 | Week 6 | Week 7 | Week 8 | Week 9 | Semifinal | Final |
|---|---|---|---|---|---|---|---|---|---|---|---|
| Kim Grigoryan | Safe | Safe | Safe | Safe | Safe | Safe | Safe | Safe | Safe | Safe | Winner |
| Armen Yedigaryan | Safe | Safe | Safe | Safe | Safe | Safe | Safe | Safe | Safe | Safe | Runner-Up |
| Lena Ghazaryan | Safe | Safe | Safe | Safe | Safe | Safe | Bottom two | Safe | Safe | 3rd | Eliminated (Semifinal) |
| Marianna Shanoyan | Safe | Safe | Safe | Bottom two | Safe | Safe | Safe | Safe | 4th | Eliminated (Week 9) | |
| Gevorg Harutyunyan | Safe | Safe | Safe | Safe | Safe | Safe | Safe | 5th | Eliminated (Week 8) | | |
| Asya Poghosyan | Safe | Safe | Safe | Safe | 7th | Bottom two | Bottom two | Eliminated (Week 7) | | | |
| International | Safe | Safe | Safe | Safe | Safe | Bottom two | Eliminated (Week 6) | | | | |
| Karina Khachatryan | Safe | Bottom two | Safe | Safe | 8th | Eliminated (Week 5) | | | | | |
| Diamonds | Safe | Safe | Bottom two | Bottom two | Eliminated (Week 4) | | | | | | |
| Mihran Petrosyan | 11th | Safe | Bottom two | Eliminated (Week 3) | | | | | | | |
| Svetlana Voskanyan | Safe | Bottom two | Eliminated (Week 2) | | | | | | | | |
| Storm | 12th | Eliminated (Week 1) | | | | | | | | | |
| Bottom two | Storm, Mihran Petrosyan | Sveltana Voskanyan, Karina Khachatryan | Mihran Petrosyan, Diamonds | Diamonds, Marianna Shanoyan | Karina Khachatryan, Asya Poghosyan | International, Asya Poghosyan | Asya Poghosyan, Lena Ghazarayn | No bottom two/judges' vote; public votes alone decide who is eliminated. | | | |
| Judges voted to | Save | | | | | | | No bottom two/judges' vote; public votes alone decide who is eliminated. | | | |
| Papoyan's vote | Mihran Petrosyan | - | Diamonds | Marianna Shanoyan | Karina Khachatryan | Asya Poghoysan | Lena Ghazaryan | No bottom two/judges' vote; public votes alone decide who is eliminated. | | | |
| André's vote | Storm | Karina Khachatryan | Diamonds | Marianna Shanoyan | Karina Khachatryan | Asya Poghosyan | Lena Ghazaryan | No bottom two/judges' vote; public votes alone decide who is eliminated. | | | |
| Gyurjinyan's vote | Mihran Petrosyan | Svetlana Voskanyan | Mihran Petrosyan | Marianna Shanoyan | Asya Poghosyan | Asya Poghoysan | Asya Poghosyan | No bottom two/judges' vote; public votes alone decide who is eliminated. | | | |
| Palyan's vote | Storm | Karina Khachatryan | Diamonds | Diamonds | Asya Poghosyan | International | Lena Ghazaryan | No bottom two/judges' vote; public votes alone decide who is eliminated. | | | |
| Eliminated | Storm; 2 of 4 votes Deadlock | Svetlana Voskanyan; 1 of 3 votes Minority | Mihran Petrosyan; 1 of 4 votes Minority | Diamonds; 1 of 4 votes Minority | Karina Khachatryan; 2 of 4 votes Deadlock | International; 1 of 4 votes Minority | Asya Poghosyan; 1 of 4 votes Minority | Gevorg Harutyunyan; 5th Place | Marianna Shanoyan; 4th Place | Lena Ghazaryan; 3rd Place | Armen Yedigaryan; Runner-Up |
| Eliminated | Storm; 2 of 4 votes Deadlock | Svetlana Voskanyan; 1 of 3 votes Minority | Mihran Petrosyan; 1 of 4 votes Minority | Diamonds; 1 of 4 votes Minority | Karina Khachatryan; 2 of 4 votes Deadlock | International; 1 of 4 votes Minority | Asya Poghosyan; 1 of 4 votes Minority | Gevorg Harutyunyan; 5th Place | Marianna Shanoyan; 4th Place | Lena Ghazaryan; 3rd Place | Kim Grigoryan; Winner |

== Season 3 (2014) ==
Simon Cowell made an appearance and told the judges what categories they would mentor. André will be mentoring the Boys, Emmy has the Girls, Garik Papoyan will look after the Groups and Egor Glumov has been assigned the Over 24s.

=== Four-Chair challenge ===
For this season of The X Factor, Cowell confirmed that the boot camp and judges' houses sections of the competition, which traditionally followed the audition rounds, had been dropped and replaced with a brand new stage called "The Four-Chair challenge". Speaking on the change, he said "It [boot camp and Judges' houses] was the one element of the show I wasn't happy with, and it looked too similar to what everybody else is doing." He went on to describe the new "middle section" as "really dramatic, very tough on us and the contestants, and very high pressure", and compared the new round as similar to the live shows.

Key:

– Contestant was immediately eliminated after performance without switch
– Contestant was switched out later in the competition and eventually eliminated
– Contestant was not switched out and made the final four of their own category

| Category(mentor) | Act | Song | Mentor's decision | Switched with |
|---|---|---|---|---|
| Girls (Emmy) | Mery Avetisyan | "Depi Yerkinq" (Դեպի երկինք) | Put in chair 1 | — |
| Girls (Emmy) | Ani Asatryan | "Yary Mardun Yara Kuta" | Eliminated | — |
| Girls (Emmy) | Sona Sarafyan | "Bound to You" | Put in chair 2 | — |
| Girls (Emmy) | Etery Hovhannisyan | "Back to Black" | Put in chair 3 | — |
| Girls (Emmy) | Lilit Yeghiazaryan | "Pakughi" (Փակուղի) | Eliminated | — |
| Girls (Emmy) | Anush Harutyunyan | "You Raise Me Up" | Put in chair 4 | — |
| Girls (Emmy) | Narine Yeranosyan | "Skyfall" | Eliminated | — |
| Girls (Emmy) | Anahit Hakobyan | "Sari Aghjik" (Սարի աղջիկ) | Put in chair 3 | Etery Hovhannisyan |
| Girls (Emmy) | Zhanna Davtyan | "Heart Attack" | Put in chair 4 | Anush Harutyunyan |
| Girls (Emmy) | Suzanna Melkonyan | "The Show Must Go On" | Put in chair 2 | Sona Sarafyan |
| Over 24s (Glumov) | Aram Khachatryan | "Too Close" | Put in chair 1 | — |
| Over 24s (Glumov) | Hovhannes Gevorgyan | "Kalinka" | Eliminated | — |
| Over 24s (Glumov) | Vahe Hovakimyan | "Aranc Qez" (Առանց քեզ) | Put in chair 2 | — |
| Over 24s (Glumov) | Anahit Yengibaryan | "Counting Stars" | Put in chair 3 | — |
| Over 24s (Glumov) | Hovsep Moryan | "Du Kas" (Դու կաս) | Eliminated | — |
| Over 24s (Glumov) | Nvard Hovakimyan | "Cry Me a River" | Put in chair 4 | — |
| Over 24s (Glumov) | Davit Chakhalyan | "Um" (Ում) | Eliminated | — |
| Over 24s (Glumov) | Hayk Avetisyan | "Yerani" (Երանի) | Put in chair 4 | Nvard Hovakimyan |
| Over 24s (Glumov) | Sargis Harutyunyan | "Kiss" | Put in chair 1 | Aram Khachatryan |
| Over 24s (Glumov) | Gagik Harutyunyan | "Hayastan" (Հայաստան) | Put in chair 4 | Hayk Avetisyan |
| Boys (André) | Gevorg Pashayan | "Not Alone" | Put in chair 1 | — |
| Boys (André) | Arthur Nersisyan | "Radioactive" | Put in chair 2 | — |
| Boys (André) | Vardan Khachatryan | "Karot" (Կարոտ) | Eliminated | — |
| Boys (André) | Aram Najaryan | "This Love" | Put in chair 3 | — |
| Boys (André) | Hayk Hunanyan | "Noric" (Նորից) | Put in chair 4 | — |
| Boys (André) | Gegham Fidanyan | "Wrecking Ball" | Eliminated | — |
| Boys (André) | Narek Vardanyan | "Im Sery Qez" (Իմ սերը քեզ) | Put in chair 3 | Aram Najaryan |
| Boys (André) | Armen Hovhannisyan | "Angels" | Eliminated | — |
| Boys (André) | Narek Khachatryan | "Nerum em Qez" (Ներում եմ քեզ) | Put in chair 1 | Gevorg Pashayan |
| Boys (André) | Vahe Margaryan | "Patranqi Tevov" (Պատրանքի թևով) | Put in chair 2 | Arthur Nersisyan |
| Groups (Papoyan) | Two Colors | "Read All About It, Pt. III" | Put in chair 1 | — |
| Groups (Papoyan) | Varduhi and Mariam | "Butterfly" | Put in chair 2 | — |
| Groups (Papoyan) | Hip Hop | "Black and Yellow" | Put in chair 3 | — |
| Groups (Papoyan) | Etery and Hayk | "The Big Bang" | Put in chair 4 | — |
| Groups (Papoyan) | The Nanos | "Try" | Put in chair 2 | Varduhi and Mariam |
| Groups (Papoyan) | DaDu | "Price Tag" | Put in chair 1 | Two Colors |
| Groups (Papoyan) | Arthur and Aram | "Wake Me Up" | Put in chair 4 | Etery and Hayk |
| Groups (Papoyan) | MiKADO | "Get Lucky" | Put in chair 3 | Hip Hop |

=== Contestants ===
Key:

– Winner
– Runner-up

| Category (mentor) | Acts | | | |
|---|---|---|---|---|
| Boys (André) | Hayk Hunanyan | Narek Khachatryan | Narek Vardanyan | Vahe Margaryan |
| Girls (Emmy) | Anahit Hakobyan | Mery Avetisyan | Suzanna Melkonyan | Zhanna Davtyan |
| Over 24s (Glumov) | Anahit Yengibaryan | Gagik Harutyunyan | Sargis Harutyunyan | Vahe Hovakimyan |
| Groups (Papoyan) | Arthur and Aram | DaDu | MiKADO | The Nanos |

=== Live shows ===
==== Results summary ====
Contestants' colour key:

| – Mentored by André (Boys) – Mentored by Emmy (Girls) – Mentored by Glumov (Over 24s) – Mentored by Papoyan (Groups) | – Contestant announced as safe (no particular order) – Contestant in the bottom two and had to perform in the sing-off – Contestant received the fewest public votes and was immediately eliminated (no bottom two) |

| | Week 1 | Week 2 | Week 3 | Week 4 | Week 5 | Week 6 | Week 7 | Semifinal | Final |
|---|---|---|---|---|---|---|---|---|---|
| Vahé Margaryan | Saved | Safe | Safe | Safe | Safe | Safe | Safe | Safe | Winner |
| Narek Vardanyan | Saved | Safe | Safe | Safe | Safe | Safe | Safe | Safe | Runner-Up |
| Hayk Hunanyan | Saved | Safe | Safe | Safe | Safe | Safe | Safe | Safe | 3rd |
| Zhanna Davtyan | Saved | Safe | Safe | Safe | Safe | Safe | Safe | 4th | Eliminated (Semifinal) |
| DaDu | Saved | Safe | Safe | Safe | Safe | Safe | 5th | Eliminated (Week 7) | |
| MiKADO | Saved | Safe | Safe | Safe | Safe | 6th | Eliminated (Week 6) | | |
| Mery Avetisyan | Saved | Safe | Safe | 8th | 7th | 7th | Eliminated (Week 6) | | |
| Gagik Harutyunyan | Saved | Safe | Bottom two | Safe | 8th | Eliminated (Week 5) | | | |
| Anahit Hakobyan | Saved | Safe | Safe | 9th | Eliminated (Week 4) | | | | |
| Vahé Hovakimyan | Saved | Safe | Bottom two | Eliminated (Week 3) | | | | | |
| The Nanos | Saved | 11th | Eliminated (Week 2) | | | | | | |
| Anahit Yengibaryan | Saved | 12th | Eliminated (Week 2) | | | | | | |
| Narek Khachatryan | Not saved | Eliminated (Week 1) | | | | | | | |
| Arthur and Aram | Not saved | Eliminated (Week 1) | | | | | | | |
| Suzanna Melkonyan | Not saved | Eliminated (Week 1) | | | | | | | |
| Sargis Harutyunyan | Not saved | Eliminated (Week 1) | | | | | | | |
| Bottom two | None | None | Gagik Harutyunyan; Vahe Hovakimyan | Mery Avetisyan; Anahit Hakobyan | Gagik Harutyunyan; Mery Avetisyan | None | No bottom two/judges' vote; public votes alone decide who is eliminated. | | |
| Judges voted to | Save | | | | | | No bottom two/judges' vote; public votes alone decide who is eliminated. | | |
| André's vote | Narek Vardanyan; Vahe Margaryan; Hayk Hunanyan | - | Gagik Harutyunyan | Anahit Hakobyan | Gagik Harutyunyan | - | No bottom two/judges' vote; public votes alone decide who is eliminated. | | |
| Emmy's vote | Anahit Hakobyan; Mery Avetisyan; Zhanna Davtyan | - | Gagik Harutyunyan | Mery Avetisyan | Mery Avetisyan | - | No bottom two/judges' vote; public votes alone decide who is eliminated. | | |
| Glumov's vote | Vahe Hovakimyan; Gagik Harutyunyan; Anahit Yengibaryan | - | - | Anahit Hakobyan | Gagik Harutyunyan | - | No bottom two/judges' vote; public votes alone decide who is eliminated. | | |
| Papoyan's vote | Mikado; DaDu; The Nanos | - | Gagik Harutyunyan | Mery Avetisyan | Mery Avetisyan | - | No bottom two/judges' vote; public votes alone decide who is eliminated. | | |
| Eliminated | Sargis Harutyunyan by Glumov | The Nanos; Anahit Yengibaryan | Vahé Hovakimyan; 0 of 3 votes Majority | Anahit Hakobyan; 2 of 4 votes Deadlock | Gagik Harutyunyan; 2 of 4 votes Deadlock | MiKADO; Mery Avetisyan | DaDu; 5th Place | Zhanna Davtyan; 4th Place | Hayk Hunanyan; 3rd Place; Narek Vardanyan; Runner-Up |
| Eliminated | Suzanna Melkonyan by Emmy | The Nanos; Anahit Yengibaryan | Vahé Hovakimyan; 0 of 3 votes Majority | Anahit Hakobyan; 2 of 4 votes Deadlock | Gagik Harutyunyan; 2 of 4 votes Deadlock | MiKADO; Mery Avetisyan | DaDu; 5th Place | Zhanna Davtyan; 4th Place | Hayk Hunanyan; 3rd Place; Narek Vardanyan; Runner-Up |
| Eliminated | Arthur and Aram by Papoyan | The Nanos; Anahit Yengibaryan | Vahé Hovakimyan; 0 of 3 votes Majority | Anahit Hakobyan; 2 of 4 votes Deadlock | Gagik Harutyunyan; 2 of 4 votes Deadlock | MiKADO; Mery Avetisyan | DaDu; 5th Place | Zhanna Davtyan; 4th Place | Hayk Hunanyan; 3rd Place; Narek Vardanyan; Runner-Up |
| Eliminated | Narek Khachatryan by André | The Nanos; Anahit Yengibaryan | Vahé Hovakimyan; 0 of 3 votes Majority | Anahit Hakobyan; 2 of 4 votes Deadlock | Gagik Harutyunyan; 2 of 4 votes Deadlock | MiKADO; Mery Avetisyan | DaDu; 5th Place | Zhanna Davtyan; 4th Place | Vahé Margaryan; Winner |

=== Live show details ===
==== Week 1 (Top 12 Finalists Chosen) ====
In this week each of the judges narrowing their number of acts down to three, without a public vote.

| Category (mentor) | Act | Song | Translation | Mentor's decision |
|---|---|---|---|---|
| Glumov (Over 24s) | Sargis Harutyunyan | "Bistreé" (Быстрее) | "Faster" | Saved^{1} |
| Glumov (Over 24s) | Anahit Yengibaryan | "Summertime Sadness" | - | Not Saved |
| Glumov (Over 24s) | Vahé Hovakimyan | "Pativ unem"(Պատիվ ունեմ) | "I've Respect" | Saved |
| Glumov (Over 24s) | Gagik Harutyunyan | "Love Me Again" | - | Saved |
| Emmy (Girls) | Mery Avetisyan | "If I Were a Boy" | - | Saved |
| Emmy (Girls) | Suzanna Melkonyan | "Hayastan Ashkharh" (Հայաստան աշխարհ) | "Armenian World" | Not Saved |
| Emmy (Girls) | Anahit Hakobyan | "Chandelier" | - | Saved |
| Emmy (Girls) | Zhanna Davtyan | "Think Like a Man" | - | Saved |
| Papoyan (Groups) | MiKADO | "Tsiatsan/Qez Gta" (Ծիածան/Քեզ գտա) | "Rainbow/Found You" | Saved |
| Papoyan (Groups) | Arthur and Aram | "Love Never Felt So Good" | - | Not Saved |
| Papoyan (Groups) | The Nanos | "Stay" | - | Saved |
| Papoyan (Groups) | DaDu | "Airplanes" | - | Saved |
| André (Boys) | Narek Khachatryan | "Cliche Love Song" | - | Not Saved |
| André (Boys) | Hayk Hunanyan | "Diamonds" | - | Saved |
| André (Boys) | Vahé Margaryan | "Myr ergir" (Մըր էրգիր) | "Our Country" | Saved |
| André (Boys) | Narek Vardanyan | "All Of Me" | - | Saved |

^1 After Glumov's decision Sargis pronounced that instead of him the show will continue with Anahit.

==== Week 2 (August 31) ====
- Theme: The 2000s and 2010s hits
- At the beginning of the show the producers sang the most sung songs on X Factor Armenia. Emmy performed "Feeling Good", Garik Papoyan "One Night Only", Egor Glumov "Im Sery Qez" (Իմ սերը քեզ) and André "I Believe I Can Fly".

Contestants performances on the second live show
| Act | Order | Song | Translation | Result |
|---|---|---|---|---|
| Anahit Hakobyan | 1 | "Gites Yes Kgam" (Գիտես ես կգամ) | "You Know I Will Come" | Safe |
| Anahit Yengibaryan | 2 | "Trouble" | - | Eliminated |
| DaDu | 3 | "Don't Lie" | - | Safe |
| Hayk Hunanyan | 4 | "Hin Orer" (Հին օրեր) | "Old Days" | Safe |
| Mery Avetisyan | 5 | "When Love Takes Over" | - | Safe |
| Vahé Hovakimyan | 6 | "Formidable" | - | Safe |
| The Nanos | 7 | "Happy (Sad Remix)" | - | Eliminated |
| Vahé Margaryan | 8 | "The Lazy Song" | - | Safe |
| Gagik Harutyunyan | 9 | "Horovel" (Հորովել) | - | Safe |
| Zhanna Davtyan | 10 | "Empire State of Mind" | - | Safe |
| MiKADO | 11 | "Andzrev" (Անձրև) | "Rain" | Safe |
| Narek Vardanyan | 12 | "Talk Dirty" | - | Safe |

==== Week 3 (September 7) ====
- Theme: Love songs
- At the beginning of the show the eliminated acts performed the songs that they would sing on the third live show. Anahit Yengibaryan performed "Woman in Love" and The Nanos "Don't You Remember".

Contestants performances on the third live show
| Act | Order | Song | Translation | Result |
|---|---|---|---|---|
| MiKADO | 1 | "Khorozs taran" (Խորոզս տարան) | "They Carried My Cock" | Safe |
| Vahé Hovakimyan | 2 | "Mer Siro Ashuny" (Մեր սիրո աշունը) | "The Autumn of Our Love" | Bottom two |
| Hayk Hunanyan | 3 | "Urvakan" (Ուրվական) | "Ghost" | Safe |
| Anahit Hakobyan | 4 | "My Kind of Love" | - | Safe |
| Gagik Harutyunyan | 5 | "Still Got the Blues (For You)" | - | Bottom two |
| Vahé Margaryan | 6 | "She" | - | Safe |
| Zhanna Davtyan | 7 | "Mi pah" (Մի պահ) | "One Moment" | Safe |
| DaDu | 8 | "Love the Way You Lie" | - | Safe |
| Narek Vardanyan | 9 | "Ari, ari" (Արի, արի) | "Come Come" | Safe |
| Mery Avetisyan | 10 | "Umbrella" | - | Safe |
Final showdown details
| Vahé Hovakimyan | 1 | "Khent Aghjik" (Խենթ աղջիկ) | "Crazy Girl" | Eliminated |
| Gagik Harutyunyan | 2 | "Change the World" | - | Safe |

Judges' votes to save

- Papoyan: Gagik Harutyunyan – gave no reason
- Emmy: Gagik Harutyunyan – gave no reason
- André: Gagik Harutyunyan – gave no reason
- Glumov was not required to vote since there was already a majority

==== Week 4 (September 14) ====
- Theme: The 1980s and 1990s hits

Contestants performances on the fourth live show
| Act | Order | Song | Translation | Result |
|---|---|---|---|---|
| Gagik Harutyunyan | 1 | "Change the World" | - | Safe |
| Mery Avetisyan | 2 | "Hayreniq" (Հայրենիք) | "Fatherland" | Bottom two |
| Hayk Hunanyan | 3 | "Sorry Seems to Be the Hardest Word" | - | Safe |
| Zhanna Davtyan | 4 | "Imagine" | - | Safe |
| MiKADO | 5 | "Tjkuytik (Ճկույթիկ)" | "Little Finger" | Safe |
| Vahé Margaryan | 6 | "Kilikia" | - | Safe |
| Anahit Hakobyan | 7 | "The Winner Takes It All" | - | Bottom two |
| DaDu | 8 | "Yete imanayir" (Եթե իմանայիր) | "If You Knew" | Safe |
| Narek Vardanyan | 9 | "Bad" | - | Safe |
Final showdown details
| Mery Avetisyan | 1 | "Im anush hayreniq" (Իմ անուշ հայրենիք) | "My Sweety Homeland" | Safe |
| Anahit Hakobyan | 2 | "Hayastan ashkharh" (Հայաստան աշխարհ) | "Armenian World" | Eliminated |

Judges' votes to save

- Papoyan: Mery Avetisyan
- André: Anahit Hakobyan
- Glumov: Anahit Hakobyan
- Emmy: Mery Avetisyan

==== Week 5 (September 21) ====
- Theme: Patriotic Songs
- Musical guests: Sona Rubenyan and Mher ("Hayastan")

Contestants performances on the fifth live show
| Act | Order | Song | Translation | Result |
|---|---|---|---|---|
| Mery Avetisyan | 1 | "Im anush hayreniq" (Իմ անուշ հայրենիք) | "My Sweety Homeland" | Bottom two |
| DaDu | 2 | "Hayastan" (Հայաստան) | "Armenia" | Safe |
| Gagik Harutyunyan | 3 | "Ver kac yeghbayr im" (Վե՛ր կաց, եղբա՛յր իմ) | "Stand Up My Brother" | Bottom two |
| Hayk Hunanyan | 4 | "Hayreniq" (Հայրենիք) | "Fatherland" | Safe |
| MiKADO | 5 | "Hayi acher" (Հայի աչեր) | "Armenian eyes" | Safe |
| Vahé Margaryan | 6 | "Yeraz im yerkir hayreni" (Երազ իմ երկիր հայրենի) | "My Dream Homeland Armenia" | Safe |
| Zhanna Davtyan | 7 | "Martiki yergy" (Մարտիկի երգը) | "Fighter's song" | Safe |
| Narek Vardanyan | 8 | "Menq enq mer sarery" (Մենք ենք մեր սարերը) | "We Are Our Mountains" | Safe |
Final showdown details
| Mery Avetisyan | 1 | "Only Girl (In the World)" | - | Safe |
| Gagik Harutyunyan | 2 | "La Camisa Negra" | "The Black Shirt" | Eliminated |

Judges' votes to save

- Glumov: Gagik Harutyunyan
- Emmy: Mery Avetisyan
- Papoyan: Mery Avetisyan
- André: Gagik Harutyunyan

==== Week 6 (September 28) ====
- Theme: The Armenian and foreign hits of last 10 years

Contestants performances on the sixth live show
| Act | Order | Song | Translation | Result |
|---|---|---|---|---|
| Mery Avetisyan | 1 | "Only Girl (In the World)" | - | Eliminated |
| Hayk Hunanyan | 2 | "Ha Nino" (Հա Նինո) | "Yeah, Nino" | Safe |
| MiKADO | 3 | "PreGomesh" (ՊռեԳոմեշ) | - | Eliminated |
| Vahé Margaryan | 4 | "Fairytale" | - | Safe |
| DaDu | 5 | "Wild Ones" | - | Safe |
| Narek Vardanyan | 6 | "Qaminer" (Քամիներ) | "Winds" | Safe |
| Zhanna Davtyan | 7 | "Firework" | - | Safe |

==== Week 7 (October 5) ====
- Theme: Retro songs
- At the beginning of the show the eliminated acts performed the songs that they would sing on the seventh live show. MiKADO performed "Highway Star" and Mery Avetisyan "It's a Man's Man's Man's World".

Contestants performances on the seventh live show
| Act | Order | Song | Result |
|---|---|---|---|
| Narek Vardanyan | 1 | "Susanna" | Safe |
| DaDu | 2 | "Coco Jamboo" | Eliminated |
| Hayk Hunanyan | 3 | "L'Italiano" | Safe |
| Zhanna Davtyan | 4 | "Hero" | Safe |
| Vahé Margaryan | 5 | "Blue Suede Shoes" | Safe |

==== Semifinal (October 19) ====
- Themes: Celebrity duets, Soundtracks
- During the show the eliminated DaDu performed the songs that they would sing on the eight live show. They performed "Not Alone" with Aram Mp3, and "Can't Hold Us".

Contestants' performances on the semifinal
| Act | Order | First song | Translation | Second song | Translation | Result |
|---|---|---|---|---|---|---|
| Zhanna Davtyan | 1 | "Linem Qami" (with Erik) | "Being a Wind" | "Krunk" (Կռունկ) | "Crane" | Eliminated |
| Hayk Hunanyan | 2 | "Bayc Du Ches Galis" (with Arsen Safaryan) | "But You Don't Come" | "Vorogayt" (Որոգայթ) | "Snare" | Safe |
| Vahé Margaryan | 3 | "Une Vie D'amour" (with Sona Rubenyan) | "A Life of Love" | "Les Montagnes d'Armenie" | "The Mountains of Armenia" | Safe |
| Narek Vardanyan | 4 | "Ov Sirun, Sirun" (with André) | - | "Parla Più Piano" | "Speak Softly Love" | Safe |

==== Final (October 26) ====
- Themes: Favorite performance, Winner's song
- Duets: Narek Vardanyan and Hayk Hunanyan performed "Patker" (Պատկեր), Zhanna Davtyan and Vahé Margaryan "Say Something".
- During the show the eliminated Zhanna Davtyan performed her own song written by Garik Papoyan. The song is called "Doors".

Contestants' performances on the final
| Act | Order | First song | Second song | Translation | Result |
|---|---|---|---|---|---|
| Hayk Hunanyan | 1 | "Sorry Seems to Be the Hardest Word" | "Haghtenq Miasin" (Հաղթենք միասին) | "Winning Together" | Eliminated |
| Vahé Margaryan | 2 | "She" | "Haghtenq Miasin" (Հաղթենք միասին) | "Winning Together" | Winner |
| Narek Vardanyan | 3 | "Talk Dirty" | "Haghtenq Miasin" (Հաղթենք միասին) | "Winning Together" | Runner-Up |

== Season 4 (2016-2017) ==
For the first time in X Factor Armenia history, viewers voted on the official web page of Shant TV to determine which of the judges was allocated each of the four categories. The judges learnt the result during the four-chair challenge. André will be mentoring the Boys, Erik has the Girls, Garik Papoyan will look after the Groups and Shushanik Arevshatyan has been assigned the Over 22s.

=== Contestants ===
– Winner
– Runner-up

| Category (mentor) | Acts | | | |
|---|---|---|---|---|
| Boys (André) | Qerob Hovelyan | Edgar Ghandilyan | Yuri Adamyan | Abraham Khublaryan |
| Girls (Karapetyan) | Hasmik Karapetyan | Mané Baghdasaryan | Inna Sayadyan | Diana Harutyunyan |
| Over 22s (Arevshatyan) | Valeria Baltaeva | David Chakhalyan | Harutyun Hakobyan | Tyom Hakobyan |
| Groups (Papoyan) | The Steps Band | Alternative | Emmanuel & Mariam | |

=== Live shows ===
==== Results summary ====
Contestants' colour key:

| – Mentored by André (Boys) – Mentored by Erik (Girls) – Mentored by Arevshatyan (Over 22s) – Mentored by Papoyan (Groups) | – Contestant announced as safe (no particular order) – Contestant in the bottom two and had to perform in the sing-off – Contestant received the fewest public votes and was immediately eliminated (no bottom two) |

| | Week 1 | Week 2 | Week 3 | Week 4 | Week 5 | Week 6 | Semifinal | Final |
|---|---|---|---|---|---|---|---|---|
| Edgar Ghandilyan | Saved | Safe | Safe | Safe | Safe | Safe | Safe | Winner |
| Inna Sayadyan | Saved | Safe | Safe | Safe | Safe | Safe | Safe | Runner-Up |
| Emmanuel & Mariam | Saved | Safe | Safe | Safe | Safe | Safe | Safe | 3rd Place |
| Abraham Khublaryan | Saved | Safe | Safe | Safe | Safe | Safe | Safe | 4th Place |
| Tyom Hakobyan | Saved | Safe | Safe | Bottom two | Safe | Safe | 5th | Eliminated (Semifinal) |
| Yuri Adamyan | Saved | Safe | Safe | Safe | Bottom two | 6th | Eliminated (Week 6) | |
| David Chakhalyan | Saved | Safe | Safe | Safe | Bottom two | Eliminated (Week 5) | | |
| Hasmik Karapetyan | Saved | Safe | Safe | Bottom two | Eliminated (Week 4) | | | |
| Harutyun Hakobyan | Saved | Safe | 9th | Eliminated (Week 3) | | | | |
| AlternatiV | Saved | Safe | 10th | Eliminated (Week 3) | | | | |
| Diana Harutyunyan | Saved | 11th | Eliminated (Week 2) | | | | | |
| The Steps Band | Saved | 12th | Eliminated (Week 2) | | | | | |
| Valeria Baltaeva | Not Saved | Eliminated (Week 1) | | | | | | |
| Mané Baghdasaryan | Not Saved | Eliminated (Week 1) | | | | | | |
| Qerob Hovelyan | Not Saved | Eliminated (Week 1) | | | | | | |
| Bottom two | None | None | None | Tyom Hakobyan; Hasmik Karapetyan | Yuri Adamyan; David Chakhalyan | No bottom two/judges' vote; public votes alone decide who is eliminated. | | |
| Judges voted to | Save | | | | | No bottom two/judges' vote; public votes alone decide who is eliminated. | | |
| André's vote | Edgar Ghandilyan; Yuri Adamyan; Abraham Khublaryan | - | - | Tyom Hakobyan | Yuri Adamyan | No bottom two/judges' vote; public votes alone decide who is eliminated. | | |
| Erik's vote | Inna Sayadyan; Hasmik Karapetyan; Diana Harutyunyan | - | - | Hasmik Karapetyan | Yuri Adamyan | No bottom two/judges' vote; public votes alone decide who is eliminated. | | |
| Arevshatyan's vote | Tyom Hakobyan; David Chakhalyan; Harutyun Hakobyan | - | - | Tyom Hakobyan | David Chakhalyan | No bottom two/judges' vote; public votes alone decide who is eliminated. | | |
| Papoyan's vote | Alternative; The Steps Band; Emmanuel & Mariam | - | - | Tyom Hakobyan | Yuri Adamyan | No bottom two/judges' vote; public votes alone decide who is eliminated. | | |
| Eliminated | Valeria Baltaeva by Arevshatyan | The Steps Band; Diana Harutyunyan | Alternive; Harutyun Hakobyan | Hasmik Karapetyan; 1 of 4 votes Majority | David Chakhalyan; 1 of 4 votes Majority | Yuri Adamyan; 6th Place | Tyom Hakobyan; 5th Place | Abraham Khublaryan 4th Place; Emmanuel & Mariam; 3rd Place; Inna Sayadyan; Runner-Up |
| Eliminated | Mané Baghdasaryan by Erik | The Steps Band; Diana Harutyunyan | Alternive; Harutyun Hakobyan | Hasmik Karapetyan; 1 of 4 votes Majority | David Chakhalyan; 1 of 4 votes Majority | Yuri Adamyan; 6th Place | Tyom Hakobyan; 5th Place | Abraham Khublaryan 4th Place; Emmanuel & Mariam; 3rd Place; Inna Sayadyan; Runner-Up |
| Eliminated | Qerob Hovelyan by André | The Steps Band; Diana Harutyunyan | Alternive; Harutyun Hakobyan | Hasmik Karapetyan; 1 of 4 votes Majority | David Chakhalyan; 1 of 4 votes Majority | Yuri Adamyan; 6th Place | Tyom Hakobyan; 5th Place | Edgar Ghandilyan; Winner |

== See also ==
- Hay Superstar (Idol series)
