= Kamaris =

Village in Kotayk, Armenia

Kamaris Կամարիս
- Location within Armenia
- Coordinates: 40°14′09″N 44°41′38″E
- Country: Armenia
- Province: Kotayk

Population (2011)
  - Total: 2,075
- Area code: 022291

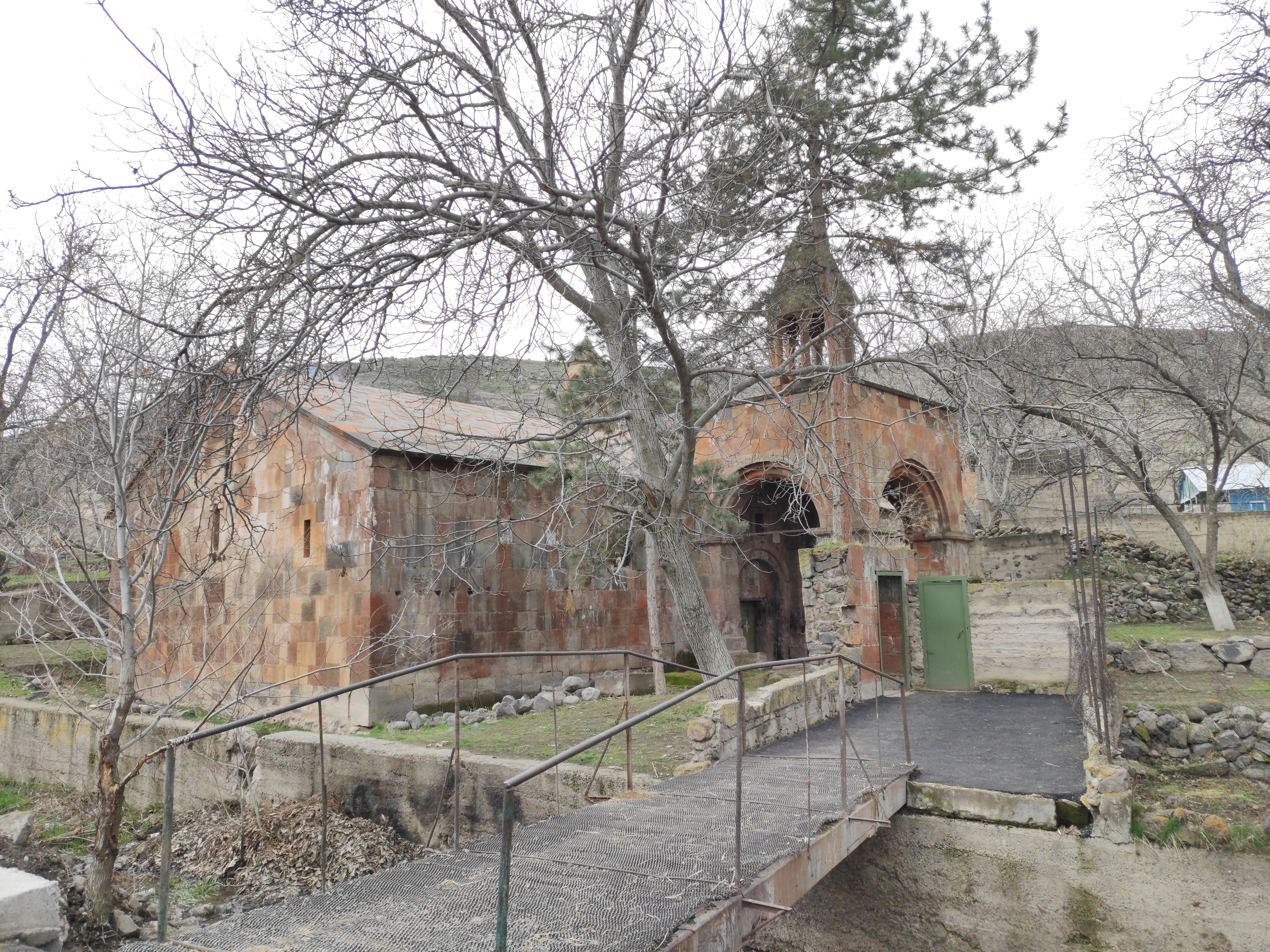
Կամարիսի Սուրբ Հովհաննես եկեղեցի

Kamaris (Armenian: Կամարիս), known as Gyamrez until 1978, is a village in the Kotayk Province of Armenia.

== Notable people ==
- Lusine Aghabekyan, singer and songwriter

== See also ==
- Kotayk Province
