= André (singer) =

Armenian singer (born 1979)

André Անդրե
- Born: Andrey Sergeyi Hovnanyan; 8 July 1979 (age 47); Stepanakert, Nagorno-Karabakh Autonomous Oblast, Azerbaijan SSR, Soviet Union
- Genres: Pop, folk, world
- Instrument: Vocal
- Years active: 1995–present
- Label: Andre Production
- Website: andre.am

Andrey Sergeyi Hovnanyan (Armenian: Անդրեյ Սերգեյի Հովնանյան; born July 8, 1979), better known by the mononym André (Armenian: Անդրե), is an Armenian singer. He was one of the most popular pop stars of Armenia during the mid-2000s, winning the Best Male Singer trophy at various Armenian Music Awards from 2004–2018. He represented Armenia in the Eurovision Song Contest 2006 with the song "Without Your Love", which was Armenia's first entry into the contest.

Upon winning the musical contest "Road to Renaissance" at the age of fifteen, he laid the foundation of his professional career. While working for 5 years at the State Theater of Music, he pursued his education at the Yerevan State Conservatory of Music and obtained his PhD.

He has also been a judge in several television shows like Hay Superstar, My name is…, Premiere and X-Factor. He also had his own reality show called Andrenaline.

Since 2005, André's producer is Anush Hovnanyan.

== Early life ==
André was born on July 8, 1979 in Stepanakert in the Nagorno-Karabakh Autonomous Oblast. André started singing at the age of three, using a chair as his first stage and his family as his first audience. Three years later he was enrolled into a musical school, where he began taking piano classes. Although a war was taking its toll on the country and its people, the only guiding light and hope for André was the music and his dream of singing. These events led him to write his first song "Prayer" at the early age of nine, showing his appreciation towards God.

His professional singing career started at the age of 15 when he won the music contest Road to Renaissance. For the next few years, André became the lead vocalist of the pop-jazz band "Karabakh", with whom he has toured all over Armenia and the Nagorno-Karabakh Republic. He has participated in numerous music festivals in Asia, Eastern Europe, and the United States, winning many of them and finishing top three in a few others. He performed a track with Australian R&B/pop singer Samantha Jade titled "Come Back".

== Career ==
=== Eurovision Song Contest 2006 ===
In 2006, he was the first artist to represent Armenia in the Eurovision Song Contest 2006 in Athens, Greece with the song "Without Your Love", a mixture between modern Western and traditional Armenian music. The song was composed by Armen Martirosyan, the conductor of the Armenian Jazz Orchestra. The instrumentation and arrangement was done by Ara Torosyan. The producer and director of the song and André's performance at Eurovision was Anush Hovnanyan. The Public Television Company of Armenia presented their entry to the public on March 15, 2006. After qualifying through the semi-final, André finished in 8th place in the competition with 129 points.

== Discography ==
=== Albums ===
- It's Me (Armenian: Ես եմ) (2003)
- Only Love (Armenian: Միայն սեր) (2005)
- 1000X/1000 Times (Armenian: 1000 անգամ) (2006)
- Secret of Happiness (Armenian: Երջանկության գաղտնիք) (2008)
- ANDREnaline (2010)
- My Soul (Armenian: Իմ հոգի) (2014)

=== Singles ===
- My Love To You (2005)
- Without Your Love (2006)

== Awards and nominations ==
Year	Award	Category	City	Result
2001	International Music Contest “Golden Skif”		Donetsk	Runner-up
2001	International Music Contest “Golden Shlyager”		Mogilev	Runner-up
2002	Voice of Asia		Almaty	Won
2003	International Youth Music Festival “Festos”	Golden Diploma Award	Moscow	Won
2003	Shanghai Asia International Music Festival	Excellent New Singer	Shanghai	Won
2003	Armenian Song of the Year	The Greatest Contributor in Armenian Music	Moscow	Won
2003	Hit FM Radio	Best Song of the Year “Antsa – gnatsi”		Won
2004	World Championships of Performing Arts	The Champion of the World	Hollywood	Won
2004	Krunk Pan-Armenian Music Festival	Best Singer of the Year	Yerevan	Won
2004	Golden Lyre Awards	Best Song of the Year “My Love to You”	Yerevan	Won
2005	National Music Awards	Best Singer of the Year		Won
2005	The Key of Glendale		Glendale	Won
2006	Person of the Year		Moscow	Won
2006	Tashir Music Awards	"Avance" Prize	Moscow	Won
2006	M Club Music Awards	Best Male Singer	Hollywood	Won
2006	M Club Music Awards	Best Armenian International Artist	Hollywood	Won
2006	M Club Music Awards	The Varduhi Vardanyan Achievement Award	Hollywood	Won
2007	Armenian Music Awards	Male Singer of the Year	Los Angeles	Won
2009	Tashir Music Awards	Singer of the Decade	Moscow	Won
2009	Armenian Music Awards	The Ambassador of Armenian Music	Los Angeles	Won
2009	M Club Music Awards	The Ambassador of Armenian Music	Los Angeles	Won

== See also ==
- Eurovision Song Contest 2006

Awards and achievements
Preceded by None (Debut entry)	Armenia in the Eurovision Song Contest; 2006	Succeeded by Hayko with "Anytime You Need"
