= Ara Torosyan =

Armenian composer and record producer

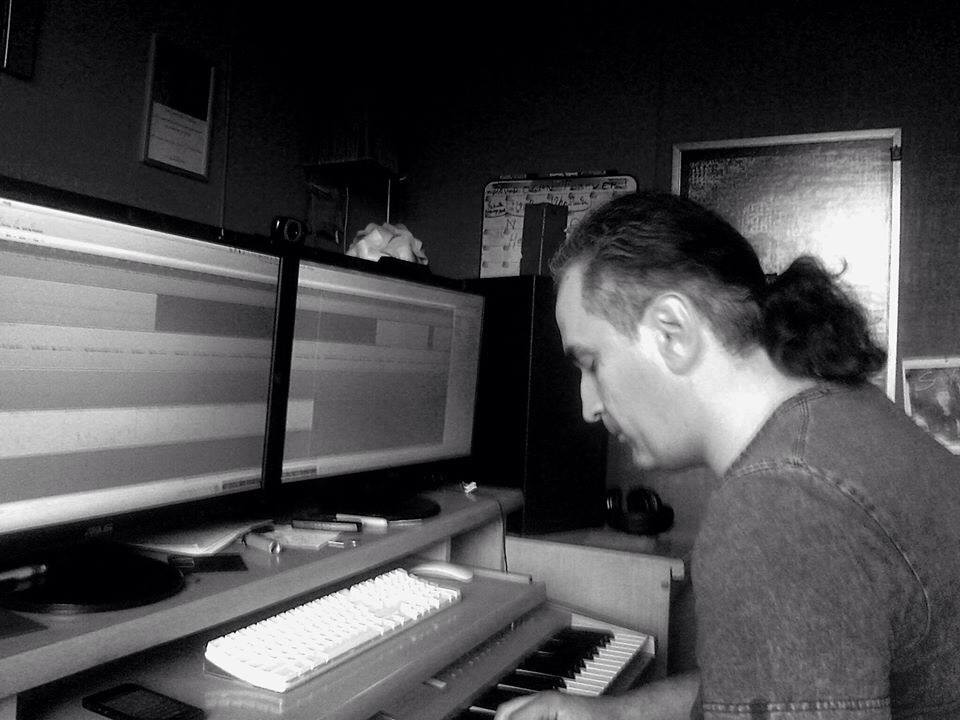
- Born: 10 May 1972 (age 54); Armenia
- Education: Komitas State Conservatory of Yerevan
- Occupations: Music arranger, record producer

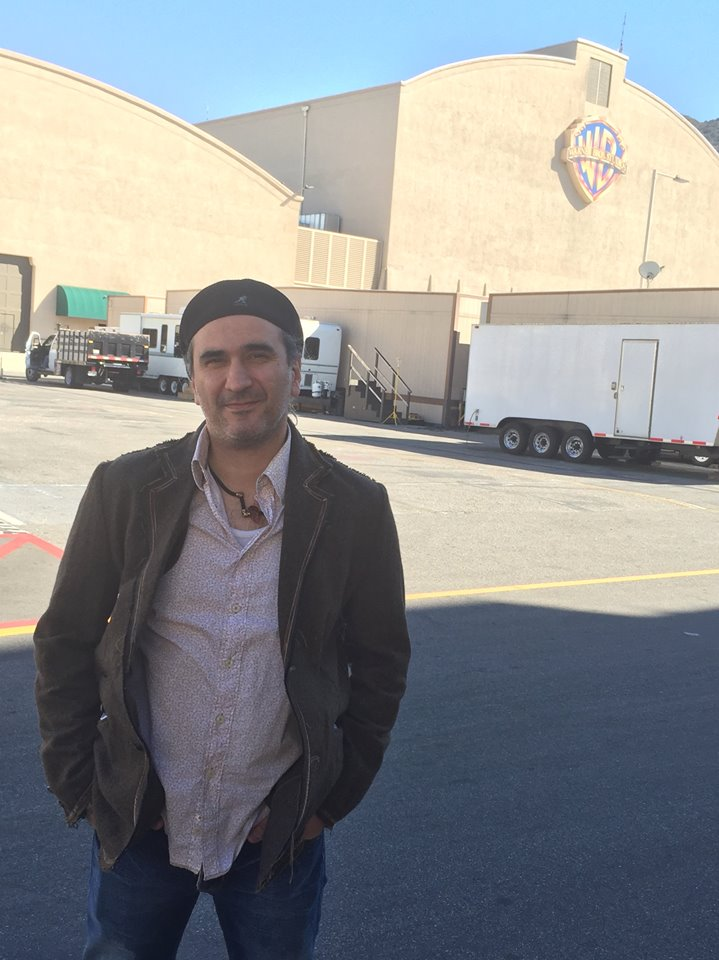

Ara Arshaki Torosyan ((Armenian: Արա Արշակի Թորոսյան; born 10 May 1972), known in the Armenian music industry by his pen name Murzo, is a music arranger and record producer. He is widely recognized to be one of the best music arrangers in his native country of Armenia. Torosyan arranged music and produced records for Andre, Tata Simonyan, Eva Rivas, as well as Armenian folk music stars Inga and Anush Arshakyan. He is a permanent member of the jury panel for the hit music television show Two Stars that airs on Armenia 1. Torosyan arranged and produced Eva Rivas's song "Apricot Stone", which was the Armenian entry for the 2010 Eurovision Song Contest held in Oslo, Norway. He is also a part of the band Vida De Cuba Project.

== Awards ==
Ara Torosyan received the following national awards in Armenia:

- 2010 Tashir Music Award in the Best Musical Producer of the Year Category
- 2008 Voske Qnar recognizing his "Contributions to the Popularization of the Armenian National Music"
- 2007 Armenian Music Award (USA) for The Best Instrumental Album category
- 2004 Armenia National Music Award in the Best Arranger of the Year Category
- 2001 Sayat-Nova National Contest
- 2001 Krounk Award in the Best Arranger of the Year Category
- 1993 Asoup in the Best Arranger of the Year Category

== Film Credits ==
Torosyan arranged music and produced soundtracks for the following feature and documentary films:

- Documentary film From Ararat to Zion, a film directed by Edgar Baghdasaryan, and narrated by Aidan Quinn.
- Feature film Yerevan Jan, directed by Michael Poghosyan
- Feature film Unwritten Law, directed by Gor Vadanyan
- Feature film Yerevan Blues, directed by Michael Poghosyan
- Feature film Mariam, directed by Edgar Baghdasaryan
- Documentary film The Land of Holy Rites, directed by Edgar Baghdasaryan

== Education ==
Torosyan is a graduate of the Komitas State Conservatory of Yerevan.
