= Emmy (Armenian singer) =

Armenian singer

Emmy Էմմի
- Also known as: Emmy
- Born: Emma Bejanyan; 12 April 1984 (age 42); Yerevan, Armenian SSR, Soviet Union
- Genres: Pop
- Years active: 1993-present
- Website: www.emmy.am

Emma Daviti Bejanyan (Armenian: Էմմա Դավիթի Բեջանյան; born 12 April 1984), better known as Emmy (Armenian: Էմմի) is an Armenian singer. During the 2010s, she was considered one of Armenia's most popular and influential singers, being labeled as a "pop princess" and "Armenian pop icon". Emmy represented Armenia in the Eurovision Song Contest 2011 and became the country's first non-qualifier.

== Early career ==
Emmy's career took off immediately after she recorded her first song, "Hayastan," and released its video, in 1993. She earned numerous awards at song competitions in Armenia, Russia, Turkey, Europe, and elsewhere. She sang and toured with the all-female folk-pop quartet Hayer from 1994 to 2000.

== Other projects ==
Emmy also runs Emmy-B Production Center, a music-production company searching for new young talents in Armenia.

In 2014, she was the judge in the Armenian edition of The X Factor, during the show's 3rd season.

== Eurovision Song Contest ==
In February 2010, Emmy along with singer Mihran participated in the 2010 Armenia pre-selection for the Eurovision Song Contest 2010 with the entry "Hey (Let Me Hear You Say)" which was even endorsed by Ricky Martin. The pair came second losing out to eventual winner, Eva Rivas with "Apricot Stone" for the ticket to the 2010 Contest in Bærum. Bejanyan represented Armenia at the Eurovision Song Contest 2011 in Düsseldorf, Germany. On 10 May Emmy failed to qualify for the final, making her the first Armenian Eurovision act to miss the final.

== Discography ==
=== Albums ===
- Emmy (2006)
- Voch 1in Chases (2007)

=== Singles ===
- "Boom Boom" (2011)

== Awards and nominations ==
Year	Organization	Award	Recipient	Result
2007	Armenian Music Award	FEMALE SINGER OF THE YEAR	Herself	Nominated
2013	Armenia's Cultural Days	"Hayastan" Song's Presentation at "Russia" The Great Concert Hall, Moscow, Russia	Herself	Participant
2014	LUXURY Magazine	Year pop singer	Herself	Won

Awards and achievements
Preceded by Eva Rivas with "Apricot Stone"	Armenia in the Eurovision Song Contest; 2011	Succeeded by Dorians with "Lonely Planet"
