= Nemra =

Nemra may refer to:

- Nemra (band), an Armenian rock band
- Casten Nemra (born 1971), Marshallese politician
- Haley Nemra (born 1989), American-born Marshallese track athlete
