= Nemra (band) =

Armenian rock band

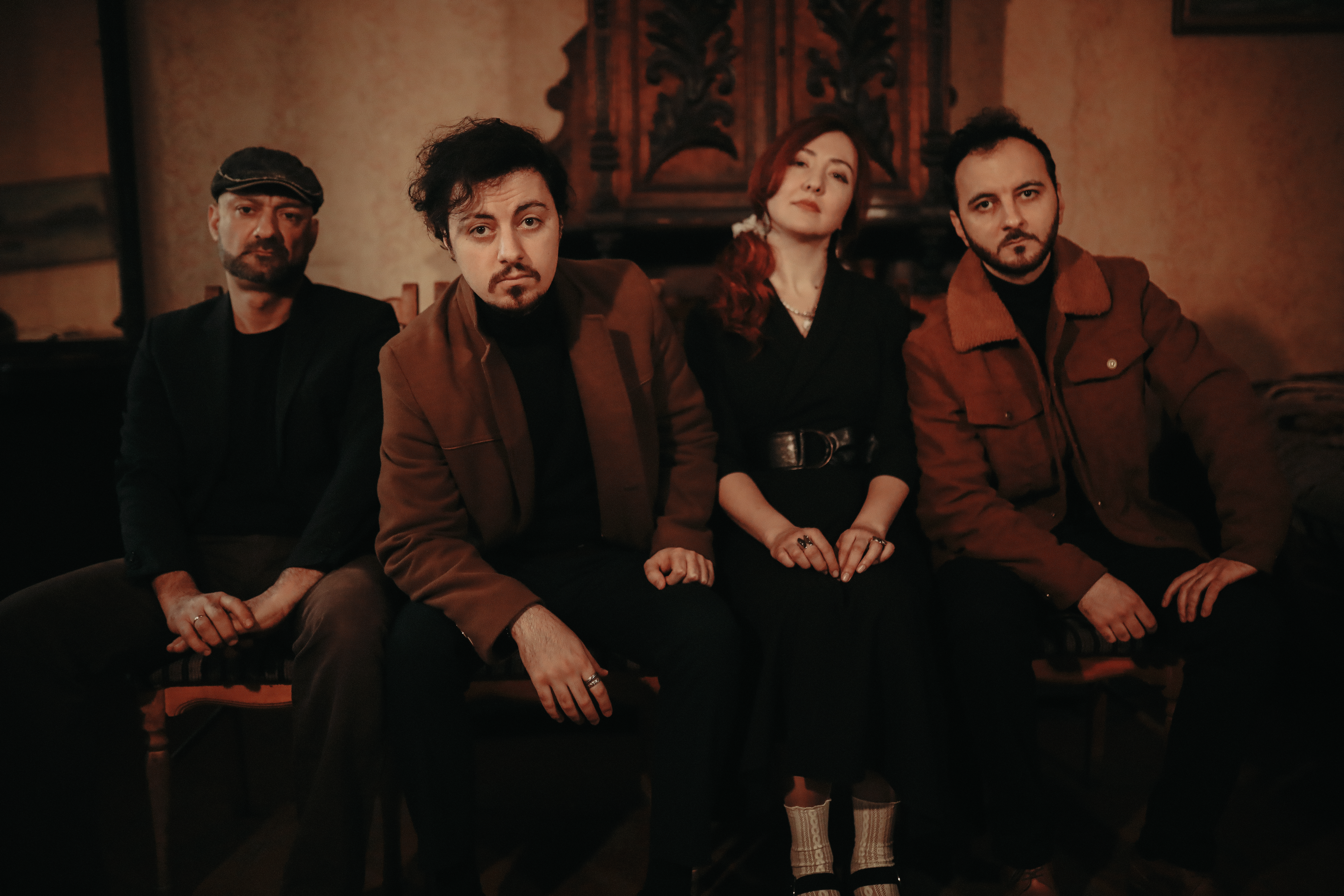

Background information
- Origin: Yerevan, Armenia
- Genres: Rock; alternative rock; indie rock
- Years active: 2012–present
- Members: Van Yeghiazaryan; Vaspur Yeghiazaryan; Marianna Karakeyan; Marek Zaborski
- Website: nemraband.com

Nemra (Armenian: Նեմրա) is an Armenian rock band established in 2012 in Yerevan. Led by songwriter Van Yeghiazaryan on vocals and guitar, Vaspur Yeghiazaryan on bass and backing vocals, keyboardist and backing vocalist Marianna Karakeyan, and drummer Marek Zaborski. The band's music draws from the alternative and indie rock genres. They also perform cover versions of Armenian folk songs.

In 2018, the band won the Best Rock Band award at the Armenian Music Awards. In 2025, they received the Best Rock Artist or Band award at the Khazer Armenian Music Awards, one of Armenia’s most notable music ceremonies, and won the same award again in 2026.

They have released three studio albums in English "Mubla", "Hmm" and "The End of the Party" (2025), an Armenian-language EP, as well as multiple singles and music videos.

In 2018, Nemra competed in the Depi Evratesil show with the song "I'm a Liar" placing second.

They have toured internationally, performing in cities such as Los Angeles, Seattle, Toronto, Montreal, Boston, Bratislava, Warsaw, Kraków, Kyiv, Moscow, Ulan-Ude, Tbilisi, Beirut, Budapest, Vienna, Brussels, Wiesbaden, Stuttgart, and throughout Armenia.

Nemra has received support from notable musicians, inter alia, Serj Tankian (SOAD), Brian May (Queen) and James Walsh (Starsailor).

In 2022, the band performed at the Starmus festival, sharing the stage with guitarist, Brian May, who gifted the band leader Van his six-pence guitar pick as a good luck charm for the band's career.

In 2023, Nemra performed for the first time in Los Angeles at Academy LA. A significant moment occurred during the concert when the group was honored with a certificate of recognition from the California State Senate.

On November 23, 2024, Nemra collaborated with Serj Tankian, the frontman of System of a Down, on their song “I’m Afraid of Stars”. The collaboration was significant for Nemra, as System of a Down had been a key influence on the band's formation.

On July 4, 2025, Nemra was the special guest for Zemfira at Hrazdan Stadium in Yerevan, Armenia. On March 21, 2026, the band was the special guest for Icelandic band Kaleo at the Karen Demirchyan Complex in Yerevan. In 2026, Nemra toured Europe, and in October performed in Germany for the first time, with concerts in Wiesbaden and Stuttgart.

Their hit song "Nare" has amassed over 14 million views on YouTube.

== History ==
=== 2012–2016 ===
Nemra was formed on February 17, 2012.

By 2014 they had written about 15 songs, had recorded some of them, and had made two music videos.

In 2015 Nemra was the first band to represent Armenia at the "Voice of Nomads" international music festival in Ulan-Ude.

The band has taken part in charity concerts.

On May 7, 2016, Nemra released their first album titled "MUBLA". The reverse reading of both the album title and the band's name is best explained by a quote from one of the band's interviews: "We have the tendency to look at things from different perspectives and we believe that each point of view can be unique and beautiful on its own"․

=== 2017 ===
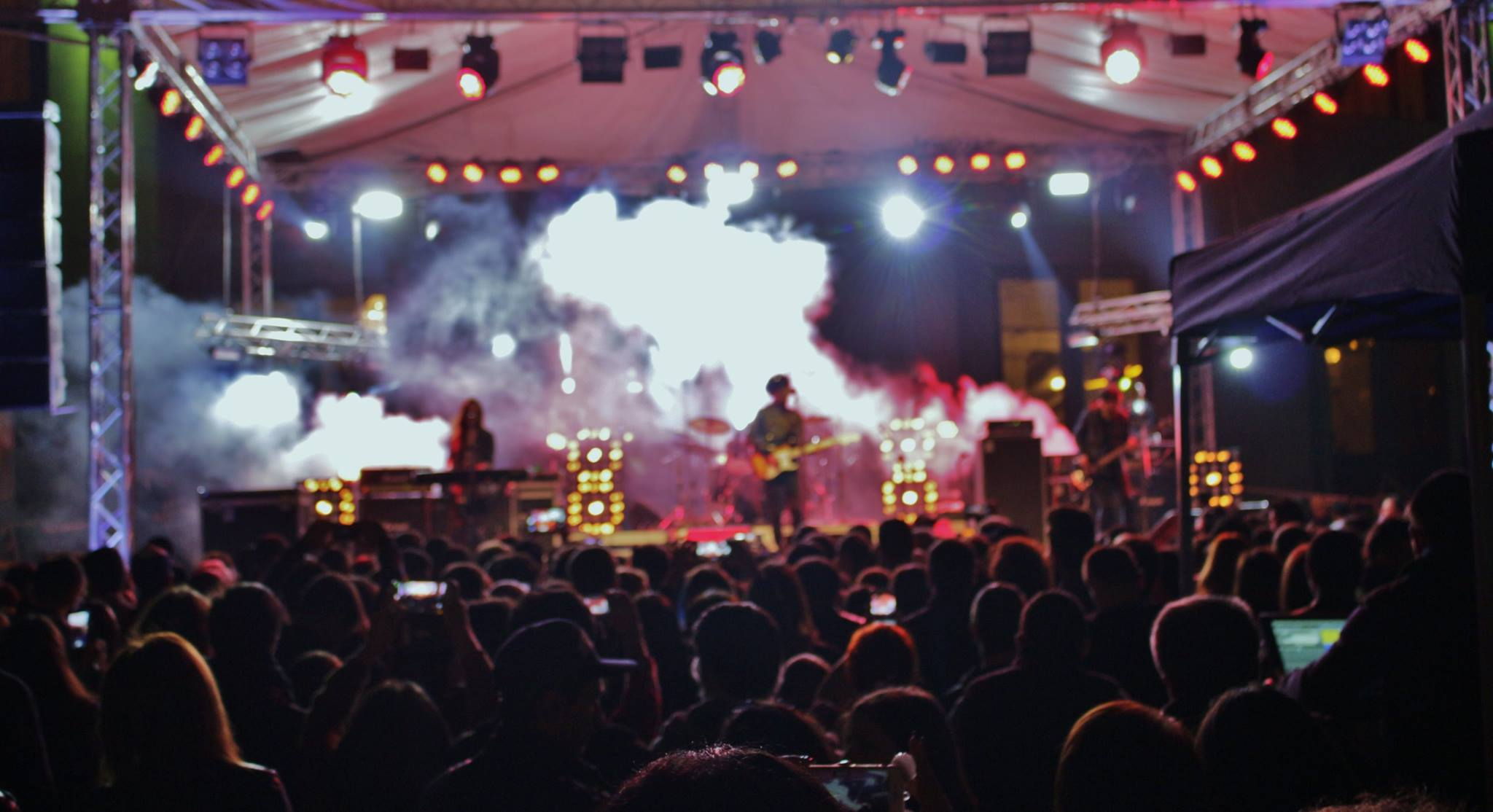
Nemra: Erebuni-Yerevan rock concert (Freedom Square)

From the beginning of 2017, the band continued its activity with concerts. The band had concerts at the Northern Avenue, Charles Aznavour Square and Freedom Square.

Nemra has also participated in numerous festivals, such as Music Drive international festival (Yerevan, English Park) and Airfest (Air Festival in Artsakh).

On July 2 Nemra was part of the concert organized within the frames of "Arvestanots" club's "RockDepiction" program of Ayb School. The program included students choosing their favorite Armenian rock bands and making posters of their songs and albums for 6 months.

On August 12 the band participated in the EPIC Rock Fest Armenia 2017.

On August 19 Nemra was part of Yell Extreme Park's birthday party concert in Yenokavan, as a special guest.

At the end of summer, a concert took place by the Swan Lake.

On September 10, 2017, Nemra had an open-air concert at Lovers' Park organized by Hayastan All Armenian Fund.

On October 14 Nemra was a special guest during Erebuni-Yerevan rock concert (Freedom Square).

=== 2017–2018: Participation in "Depi Evratesil" Song Contest ===
On December 27, 2017, Nemra was selected as a participant in the Depi Evratesil competition, the winner of which would represent Armenia at the Eurovision Song Contest 2018. The song "I'm a liar", which was written by the lead singer and guitar player Van Yeghiazaryan, was released on January 15, 2018․ The first semi-final took place on February 19, 2018; Nemra received the highest number of points from the jury panel as well as the public televote, and proceeded to the final. The final took place on February 25, 2018; Nemra took the second place.

Date	"Depi Evratesil" Song Contest	Artist	Song	Jury		Televote		Total	Place
February 19, 2018	Semi-Final 1	Nemra	"I'm a Liar"	66	12	2,125	10	22	1
February 25, 2018	Final	Nemra	"I'm a Liar"	75	10	5,815	8	18	2

=== 2018 ===
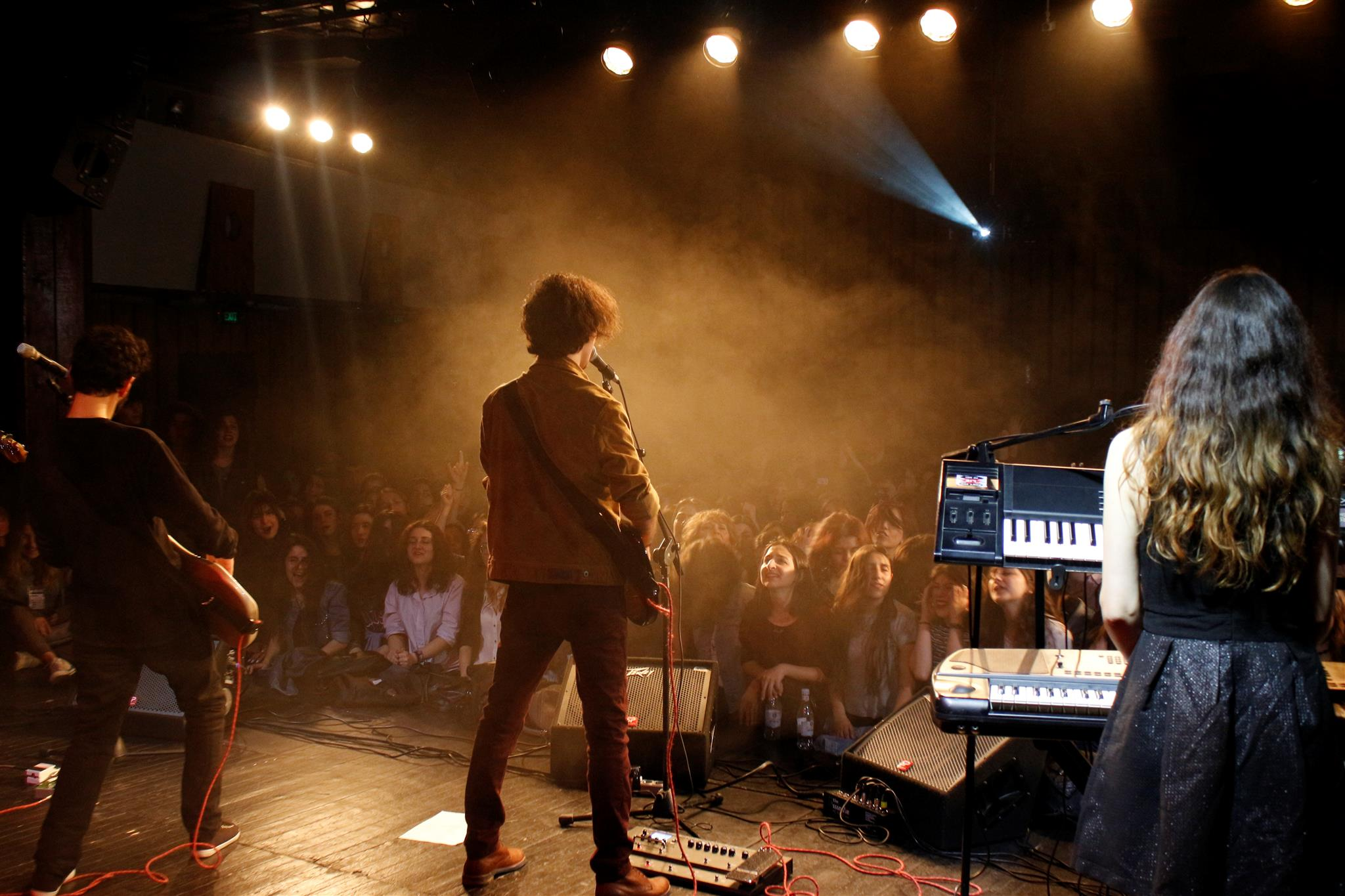
Nemra: 6 years on stage (Yerevan State Puppet Theatre )

To celebrate their sixth year of activity, Nemra performed at a concert at Yerevan State Puppet Theater on April 6; the tickets of the concert were sold out in three days. This was followed the next day by an open-air concert at Charles Aznavour Square. On April 13, Nemra was part of "Kindness is here and now" charity concert at Aram Khachaturian concert hall organized by Help Armenian Children.

On May 31 Nemra had its second big solo concert of the year at State Puppet Theater. Special guests of the evening included Gor Sujyan and Lav Eli band.

On June 14, after the viewing of the 2018 FIFA World Cup opening ceremony and the first game the competition on a big screen by the Rio Mall parking lot, Nemra had a concert.

On June 16, Nemra participated in the Artsakh Airfest 2018 at the Stepanakert Airport.

On July 21, Nemra had a concert on Yell Extreme Park's "Magic birthday party" in Yenokavan.

On July 28, Nemra had a concert at the Sevan Startup Summit Closing Ceremony.

On August 19, Nemra had a performance at Epic Eye Music and Arts Festival in Tsaghkadzor.

On September 2, Nemra participated in One Caucasus festival held in Poladauri, Georgia.

On October 20, within the framework of the "Kapan Day 2018" celebration, the band performed at the Kapan Culture House.

On October 21, Nemra took part in the concert organized to celebrate the 2800th anniversary of Yerevan. The rock concert was held in Charles Aznavour Square.

On December 5, Nemra released a new song and a new music video "Because".

On December 10, Nemra had its last solo concert of 2018 at State Puppet Theater. The band performed their well-known songs as well as some newer songs including their latest single "Because", performed live for the first time.

On December 21, Nemra released a new song and a new music video "The past has passed" filmed in Kyiv, Ukraine.

=== 2019 ===
On April 7, Nemra had an open-air concert at Lovers' Park. The band also performed one of their latest singles "The past has passed" and the new blues song called "She's beautiful", which is not yet recorded.

On April 11, Nemra was invited to perform at Tbilisi Concert Hall and received the Caucasus Music Award ''Phoenix'' 2018.

On April 27, Nemra had a performance at the Banants Stadium reopening ceremony. This concert was followed by an open-air concert in Artashat to celebrate the Citizen's Day․

On May 11, Nemra had an open-air concert in Kapan within the framework of "Europe Day" celebration.

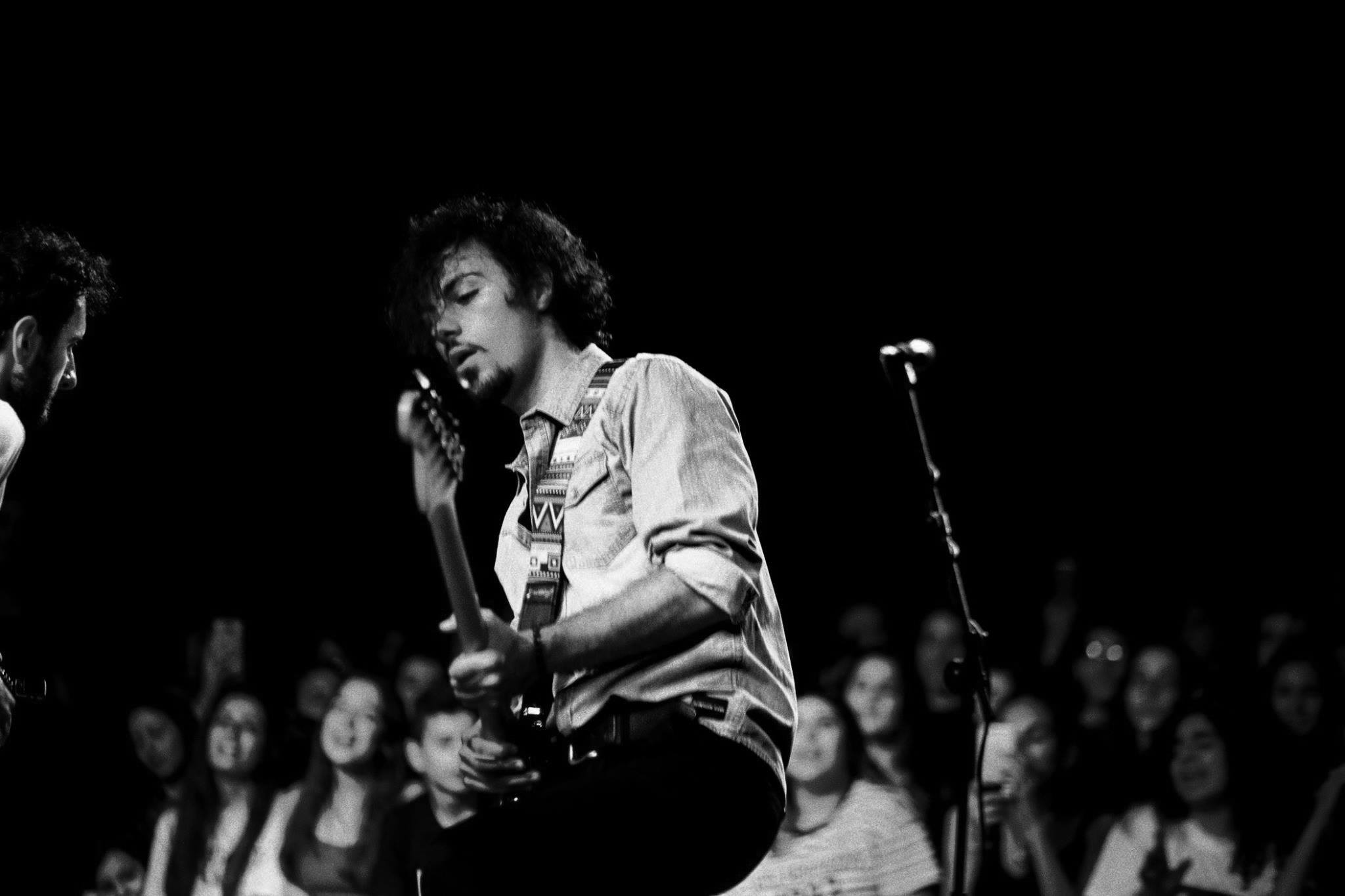
Nemra: Hmm album presentation ( Yerevan State Puppet Theatre )

On June 4, Nemra released a new song and new music video "Why" which is a dialog between humans and Mother Earth.

On June 22, Nemra had a performance at Tbilisi Open Air 2019, sharing the stage with Franz Ferdinand, Mogwai, Unkle, Rhye, David August, The Subways, Michelle Gurevich and with many others.

On July 16, Nemra released their second album titled Hmm. The album's presentation was accompanied by a great solo concert at Yerevan State Puppet Theatre. The band performed songs from the first and second albums and the new song called Hmm, from which the album got its name. Special guest of the evening was Narek Barseghyan from Bambir.

On July 21, Nemra participated in Transkaukazja 2019 festival held in Warsaw, Poland.

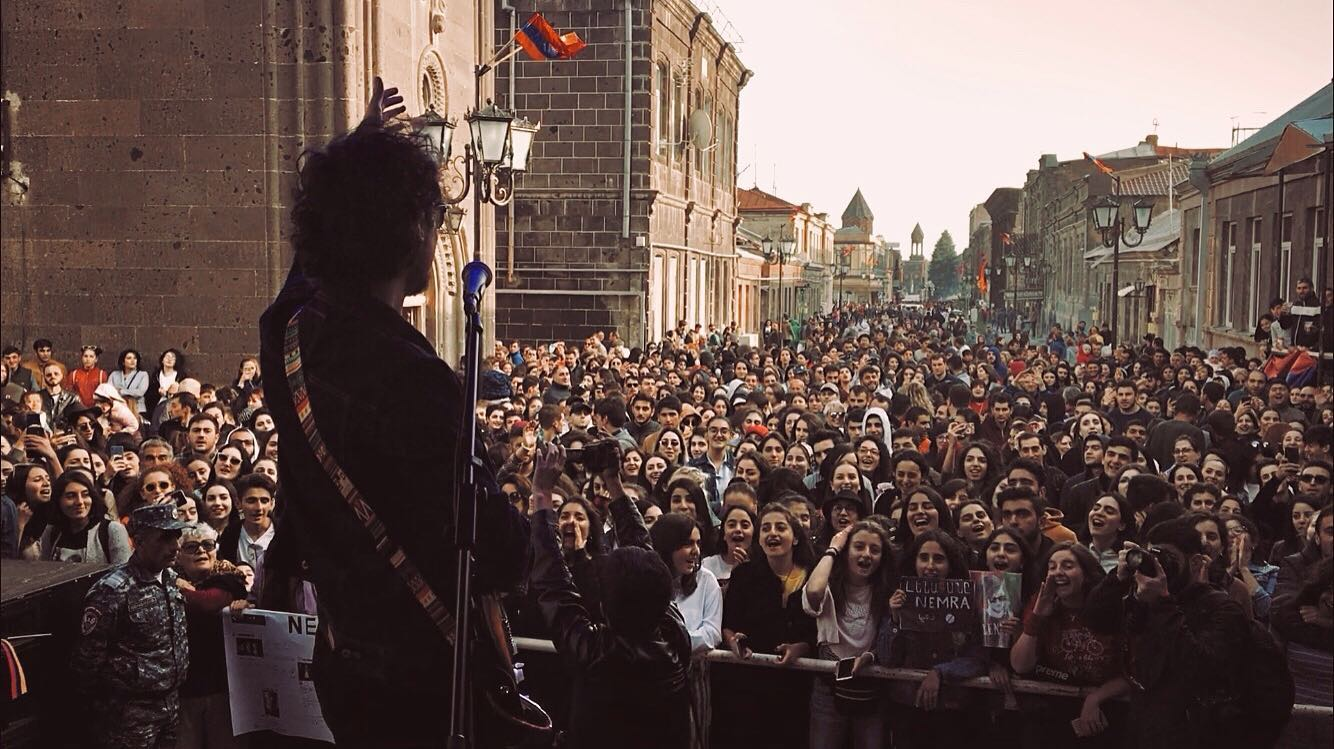
Nemra: Open-air concert in Gyumri (Armenian Independence Day)

On July 31, Nemra was special guest during Square One's birthday party.

On August 10, Nemra had an open-air concert at Shahumyan square within the framework of the "Yerevan summer 2019".

On August 22, Nemra had a performance at One Caucasus Festival in Tserakvi, Georgia.

On September 21, Nemra had an open-air concert in Gyumri within the frames of Armenian Independence Day celebration.

On September 27, Nemra participated in Armenia in Rock Festival at Freedom Square.

On October 19, Nemra had a performance at Ararat Challenge Festival within the framework of Aurora Forum. This concert was followed by an open-air concert to celebrate the 2801th anniversary of Yerevan.

On November 13, Nemra had an open-air concert to celebrate Rio Mall's birthday anniversary.

On November 16, Nemra had a performance at Russian-Armenian University to celebrate International Students' Day․

On November 23, Nemra had a performance at AGBU Armenia within the framework of Yerevan Book Fest.

Nemra's last concert of 2019 took place on December 25, at Shahumyan square.

=== 2020 ===
On April 28, Nemra performed live on Armenian public TV, in the framework of the show ''Artakarg hamerg'' (Emergency concert). There were no spectators in the hall, but the communication was organized with live comments.

On May 4, Nemra performed live stream concert on the official Facebook page of the RA Government.

On August 16, Nemra released a new music video for the song "She's beautiful". Serj Tankian, the frontman of the world-famous rock band System of a Down, praised the band's work, sharing the video on his Facebook page.

=== 2021 ===
After a long break, Nemra decided to resume concert activity on February 19, performing in Mezzo classic house club. As the tickets for the first concert were quickly sold out, soon after that, on February 27, the second concert also took place. The 3rd performance in Mezzo took place on May 7. This time also the tickets were rapidly sold out.

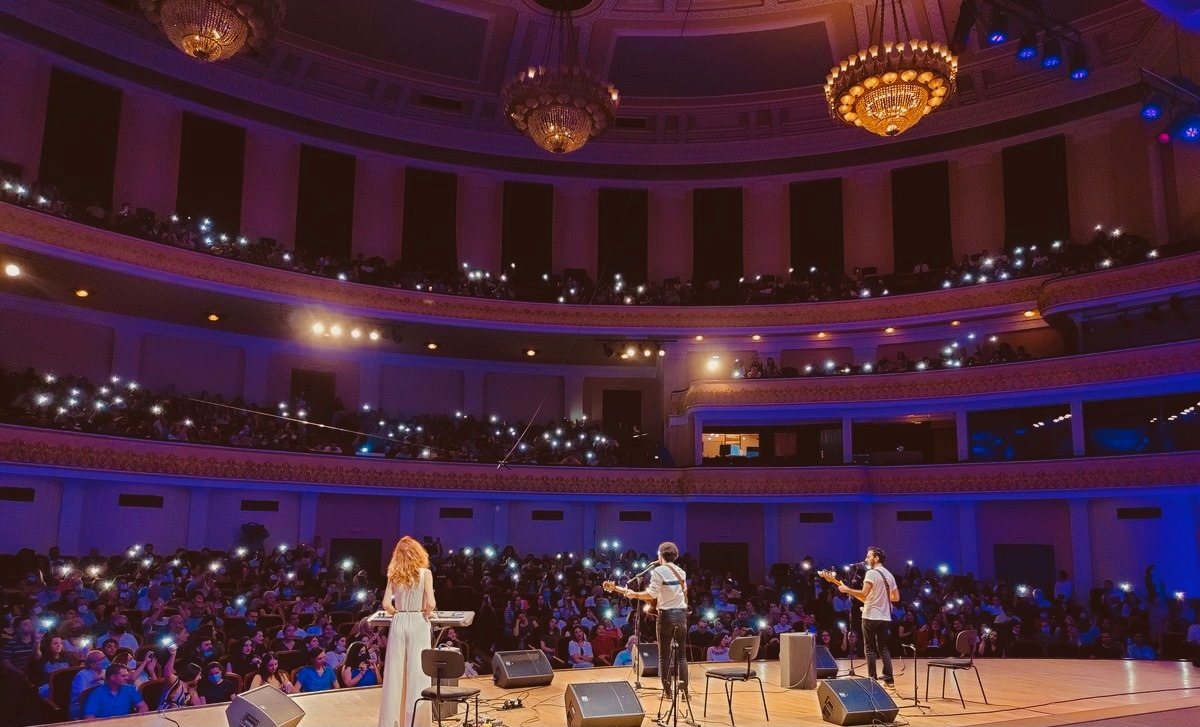
Nemra: Aram Khachaturian Concert Hall, Yerevan Opera Theatre

On May 22, Nemra had a concert in Gyumri (Garage Club).

On May 28, Nemra had an open-air acoustic concert at Dan's garden.

On June 5, Nemra participated in Alteration festival, featuring five different local rock bands.

On July 4, Nemra had an interactive open-air concert in Dzoraghbyur, sharing the stage with Lav Eli band.

On July 11, Nemra had an open-air concert in English Park, before The UEFA Euro 2020 final's live streaming on a big screen.

On July 24, Nemra had open-air concert in Dilijan, at Hover Gardens.

On July 25, Nemra released a new music video for the cover version of the Armenian folk song "Zim Khorodig Yar". This song had since a long time ago been in the band's repertoire, usually being the opening act for Nemra's concerts.

On July 31, Nemra performed in Gyumri for the second time in 2021 with an open-air concert at GGH. The tickets were quickly sold out.

On August 20, Nemra had a concert-interview on Radio Van.

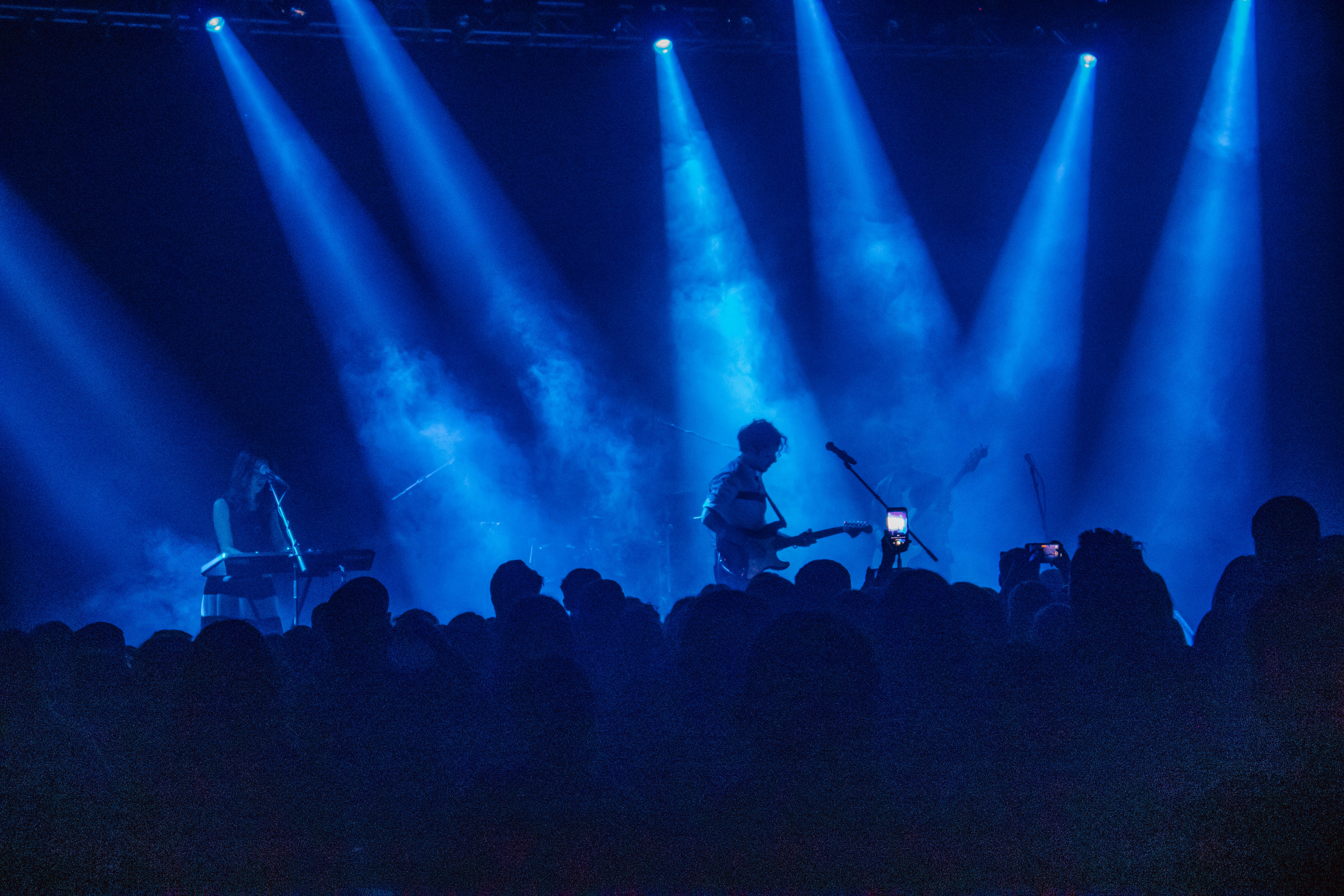
Nemra: Platform 11.12.2021

On September 9, Aram Khachaturian Concert Hall (Yerevan Opera Theatre) hosted a concert entitled "Armenian Rock for Children with Cancer". During this event Nemra, along with Lav Eli and The Beautified Project, had an acoustic performance.

On September 11, the band released the long-awaited music video for the song "Daisy". It was shot in the Armenian Women Museum in Gyumri, which was a filming location for famous Armenian movies, including "Triangle" and "The tango of our childhood". Serj Tankian, the frontman of System of a Down, praised the band's work for the second time, sharing the video on his Facebook page.

On September 26, at Radio Van Nemra had a live performance of the song Qele, Qele - dedication to the 152nd birthday of Komitas, the founder of Armenian national school of music.

On October 31, for the fourth time in 2021, Nemra performed at Mezzo classic house club.

On November 19, the band had a concert on Armenian Public TV - a non-stop live performance of Nemra's hits in English and cover versions of the beloved folk-songs.

On December 11, at a newly opened Platform concert hall Nemra had a 3-hour solo concert, performing nearly all the songs of the band's repertoire.

=== 2022 ===
On January 1, Public Radio of Armenia greeted the new year with a concert-interview of Nemra.

On February 18, Nemra performed at Mezzo classic house club.

On March 6, Nemra released a new music video for the song "Arnem Elnem", the remake of the Armenian folk song with fresh vibes.

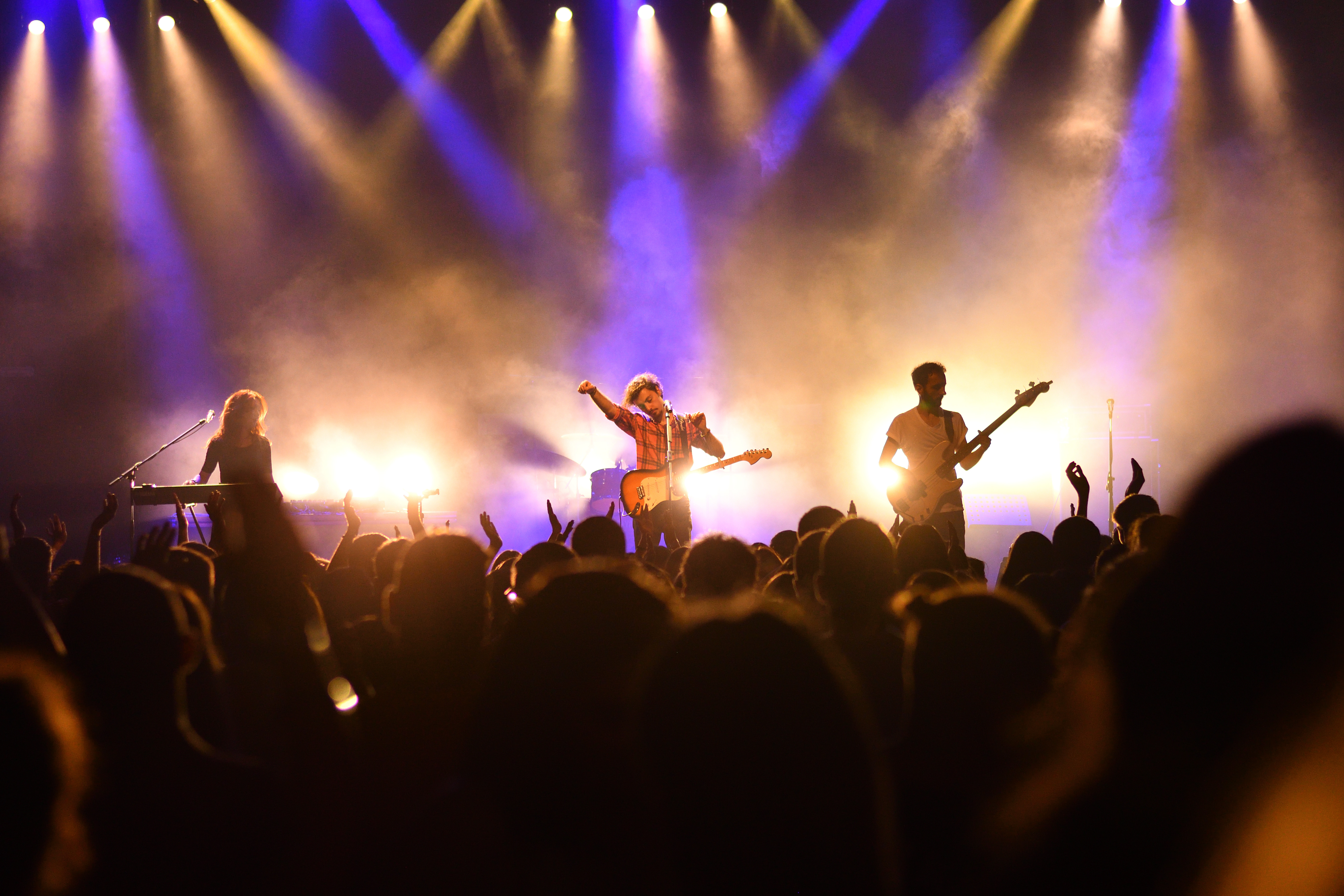
Nemra: Platform 27.08.2022

On March 19, Nemra had a solo concert at Platform, celebrating the 10th anniversary of the band.

On April 22, Nemra's live concert at Dalma Garden Mall made a start on WWF's project "Join the Planet".

On May 20, Nemra had a long-awaited solo concert at Izvestiya Hall in Moscow, for the first time.

On May 22, Nemra had an open-air concert at the Fountain Square of Ijevan within the framework of RestART Youth Fest.

On May 28, Nemra had an open-air performance at Tapi Berd (Fortress of Gevorg Marzpetuni) in the enlarged community of Vedi. The concert was held within the framework of the event named "Community Potential".

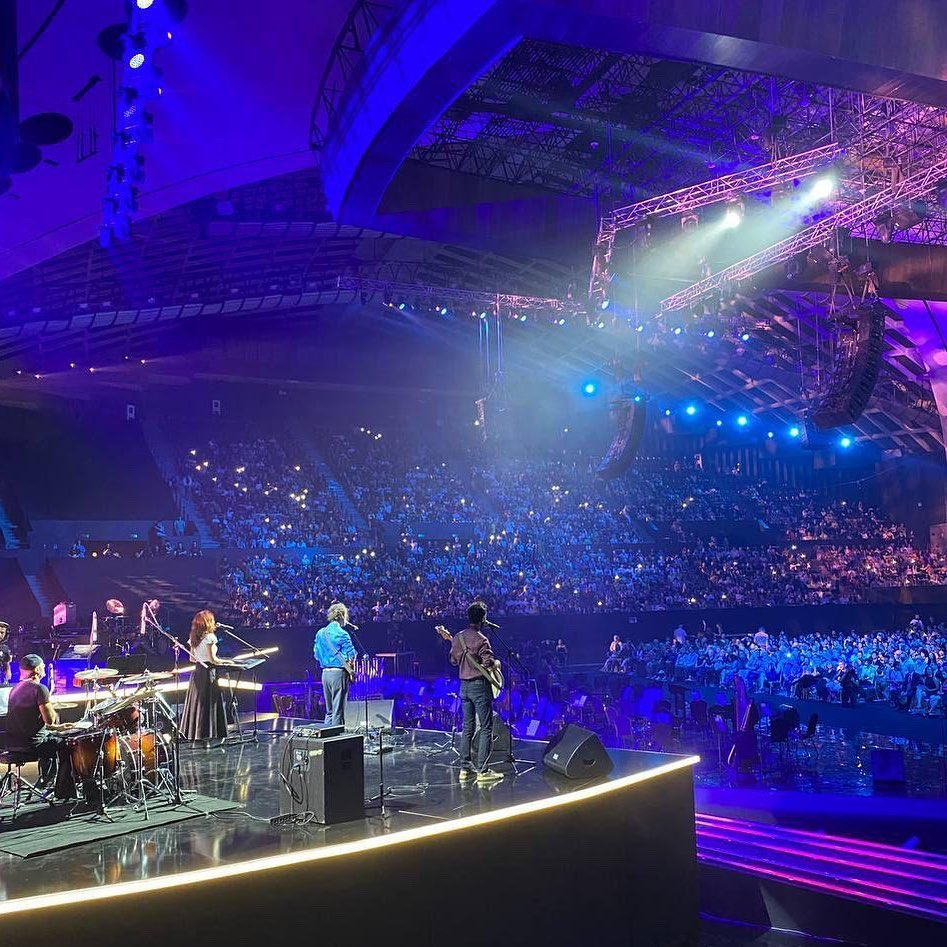
Nemra at the Starmus Festival

On May 30, Nemra gave a concert at Swan Lake, situated near Armenian National Academic Theatre of Opera and Ballet. The performance was held after the EUBC Men's European Boxing Championship's final fights' live streaming on a big screen.

On June 18, Nemra had an open-air concert within the framework of Yerevan Color Festival.

On June 25, Nemra had a performance at InDrive Music Fest held in Shene.

On July 15, Nemra took part in the Tatev Midsummer Music Fest, near the Wings of Tatev ropeway.

On July 16, Nemra had an open air concert within the framework of "Koghb Vardavar" celebration. These educational, cultural and entertainment events were held in Koghb, Tavush Region and organized by the "Koghb" Foundation.

On August 12, Nemra had an open-air concert at Hrazdan's Constitution Square, dedicated to International Youth Day. The city of Hrazdan was named Armenia's Youth Capital 2022.

On August 27, Nemra had a solo concert at Platform hall, dedicated to International Youth Day. The band performed almost all the songs of its repertoire. The special guest of the concert was Srbuk.

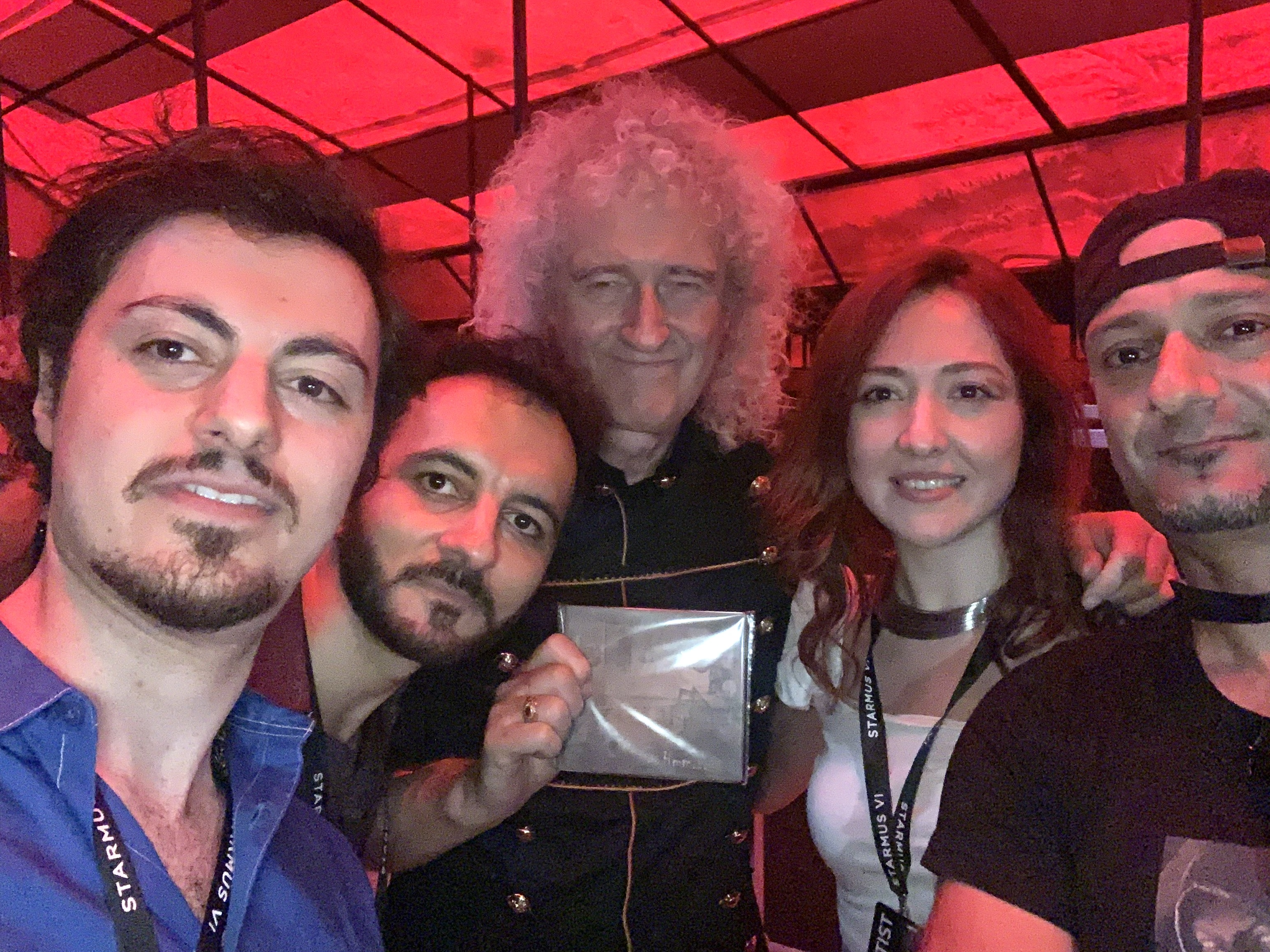
Nemra with guitarist Brian May, who gifted the band leader Van his six-pence guitar pick as a good luck charm for the band's career. (Starmus festival)

On September 7, Nemra opened the "Another World" concert program which was held within the framework of Starmus VI Armenia. The concert featured Brian May, Serj Tankian, Graham Gouldman, Derek Sherinyan and "Sons of Apollo", Montserrat Martí, as well as The Armenian National Philharmonic Orchestra.

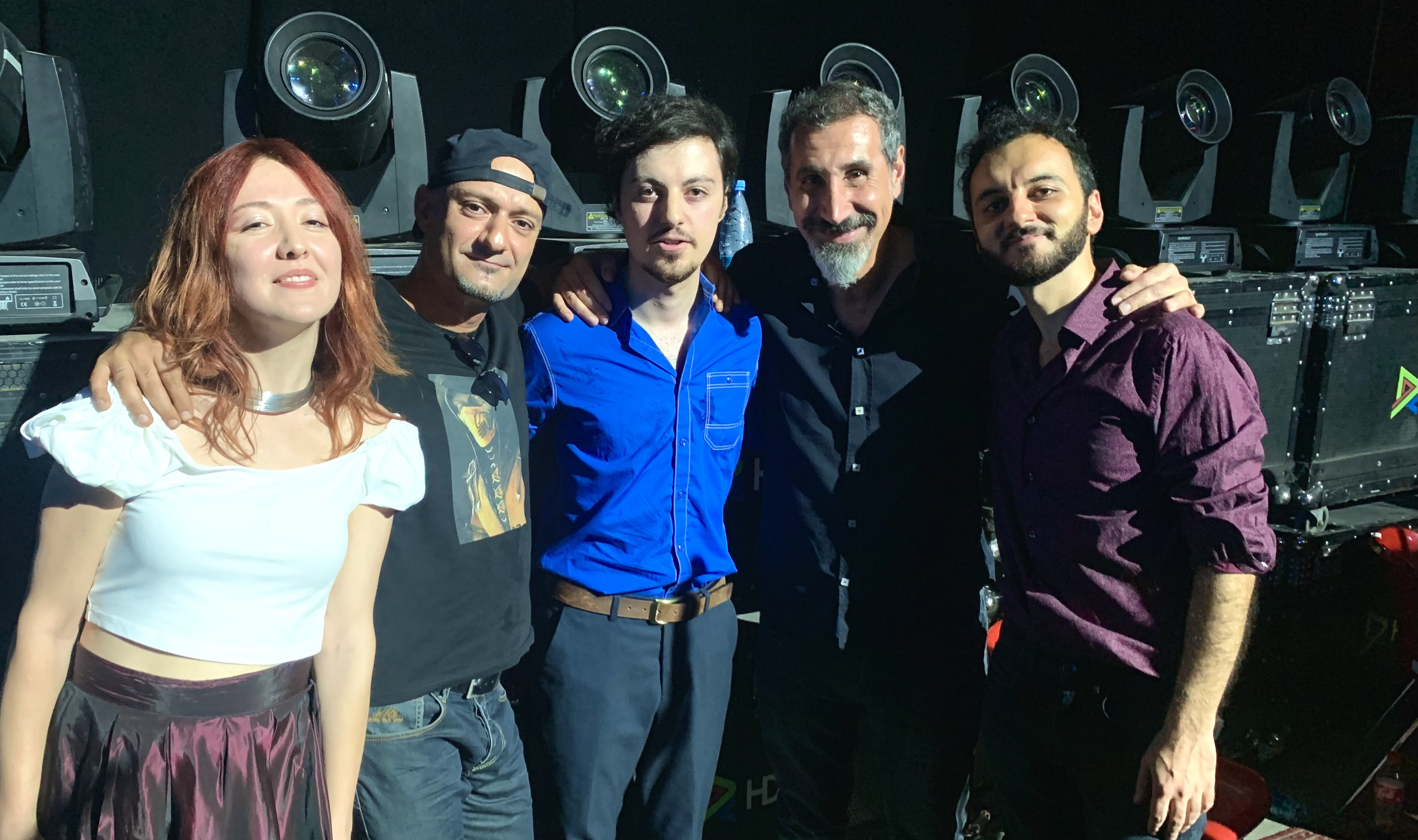
Nemra with Serj Tankian. The frontman of the world-famous rock band SOAD had previously praised the band's work. (Starmus festival)

On September 8, as part of the Music Camp of Starmus VI Armenia, they gave an open-air performance in front of the Armenian National Academic Theatre of Opera and Ballet.

On September 24, Nemra performed live for the first time in the United States. The concert took place in Boston, aiming to support the activities of the Erebuni Armenian School.

On October 14 and 21 Nemra had concerts at Hard Rock Cafe Yerevan.

On October 28, Nemra had an open air concert at Yerevan Brusov State University of Languages and Sciences in support of students' protests against the planned merger of their university.

On December 16, Nemra had an open air live performance in Shahumyan square, as part of the New Year celebration, organized by Yerevan Municipality.

On December 22, Nemra released the official audio for the band's first Armenian original song "Open your eyes".

=== 2023 ===
On January 15, Nemra released a new music video for the song "If you go".

On February 19, Nemra had a performance at Charles Aznavour Square within the framework of the Book giving day, annually celebrated in Armenia on the birth anniversary of renowned poet Hovhannes Tumanyan.

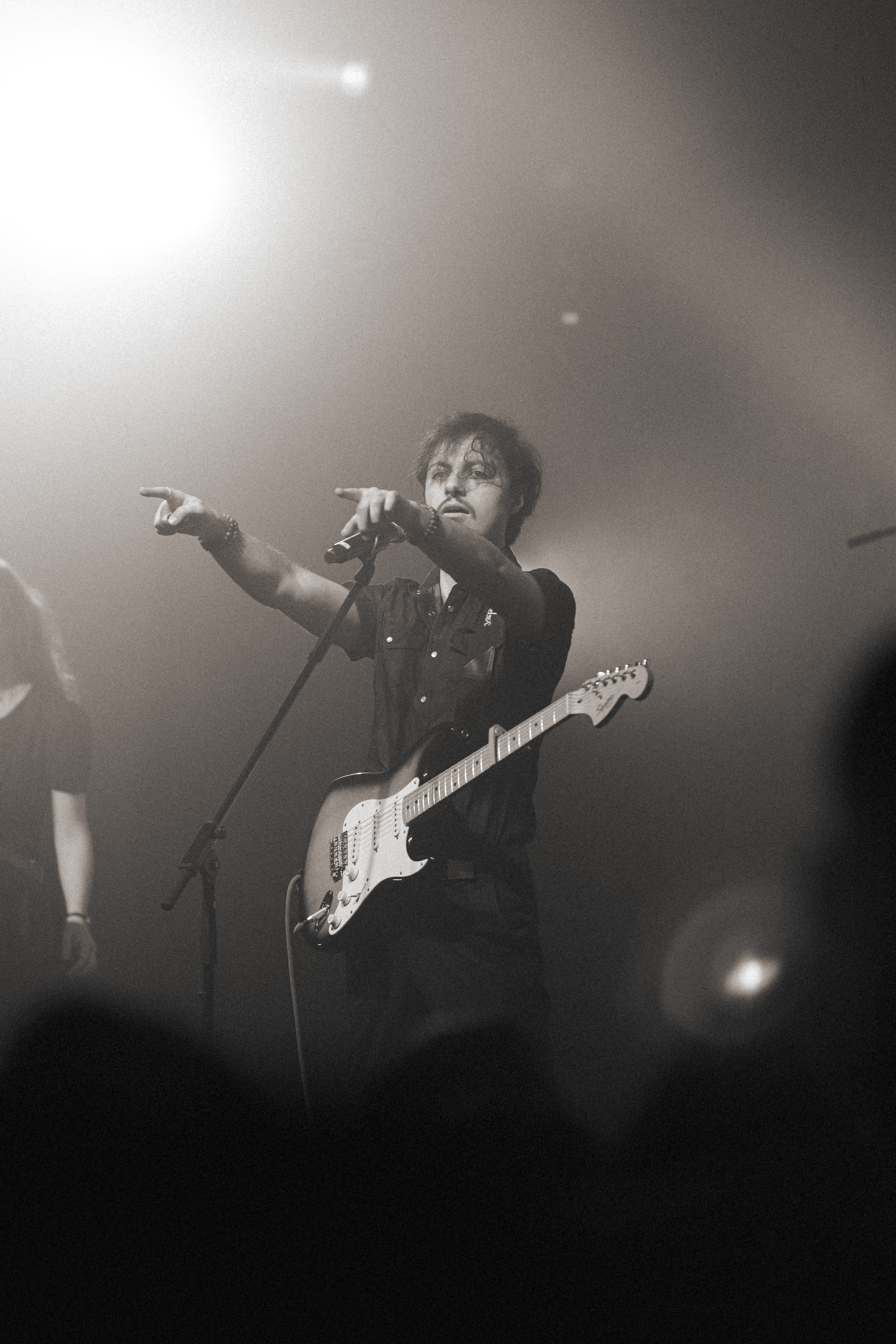
Nemra: Platform 26.05.2023

On February 24, Nemra had a 3-hour solo concert at Platform celebrating the 11th anniversary of the band. The concert programme included 32 songs- both Nemra's authorial songs and cover versions of Armenian folk songs.

On May 16, within the framework of "Learn & Work Expo-2023" Nemra had an open-air performance, sharing the stage with Lav Eli band and YSU band. This large-scale event was dedicated to the 104th anniversary of the Yerevan State University.

On May 26, Nemra took part in a charity concert, organized to raise funds to produce "MetaGait" devices for mobility rehabilitation. These devices give the soldiers with disabilities the opportunity to develop their gait function. During this event, along with Lav Eli and Garik and Sona, Nemra had a performance at Platform.

Nemra at Academy LA (Los Angeles) 17.12.2023

On May 28, Nemra had an open-air concert in Lanjazat (near Azat reservoir), dedicated to the 125th anniversary of the establishment of the First Republic of Armenia.

On December 17, Nemra performed for the first time in Los Angeles at Academy LA. A significant moment occurred during the concert when the group was honored with a certificate of recognition from the California State Senate. Quoted from the certificate:

"On behalf of the State of California, we welcome you to our great state! You are the voice of the new generation, and we wish you continued success on the world stage!"

=== 2024 ===
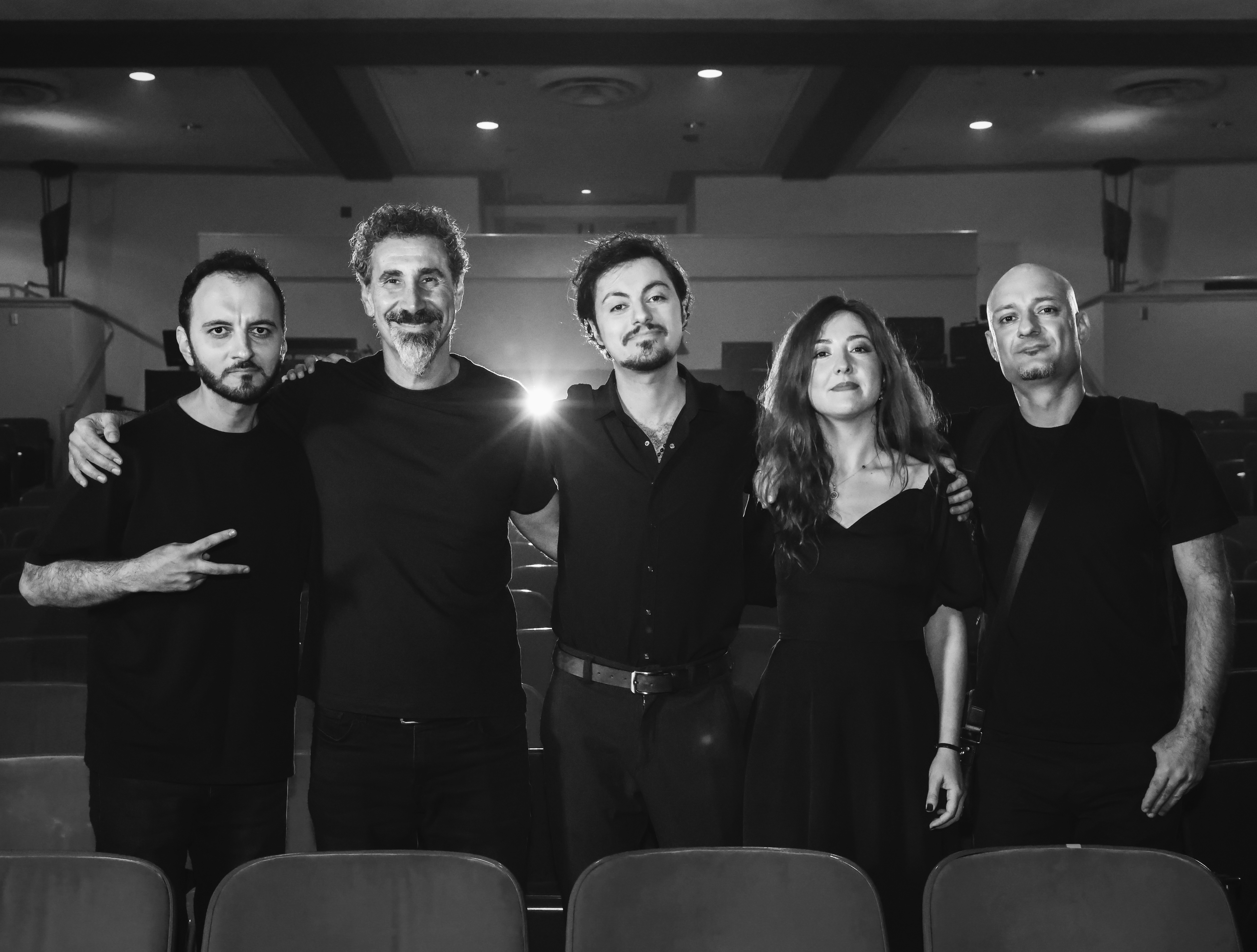
Nemra with Serj Tankian at Alex Theatre ( “I’m Afraid of Stars” )

On September 28, Nemra performed at the Alex Theatre in Los Angeles, California, as part of their U.S. tour. They continued their tour with a performance on October 4, at the Carco Theatre in Seattle, Washington. Both concerts were well received by fans.

On November 23, Nemra collaborated with Serj Tankian, the frontman of System of a Down, on their song “I’m Afraid of Stars”. The collaboration was significant for Nemra, as System of a Down had been a key influence on the band's formation.

On December 13, Nemra performed a special acoustic concert to celebrate the anniversary of Armenia's first ecocenter, Green Green Ecocenter. The event emphasized the importance of fostering a love for nature, raising ecological awareness, and encouraging community engagement.

=== 2025 ===
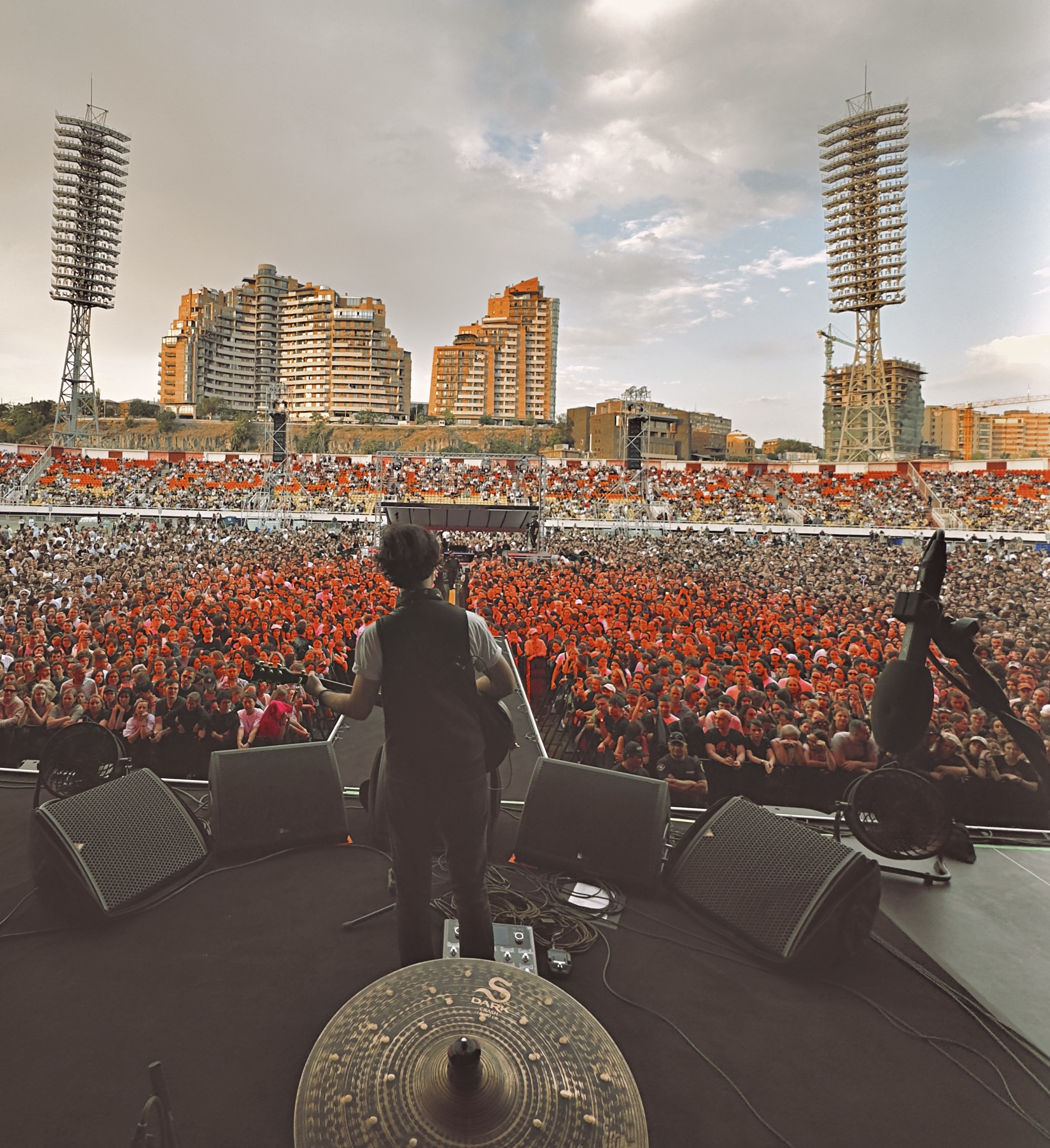
Nemra - Special Guest for Zemfira | Hrazdan Stadium, 2025

On January 6, as part of the New Year celebrations, Nemra held an open-air concert at Shahumyan square.

On March 2, Nemra held an open-air concert as part of the musical event "Yerevan Reads," which took place at Charles Aznavour Square.

As part of their Canada tour, Nemra performed on March 16 at Théâtre Beanfield in Montreal and on March 21 at the Meridian Arts Centre in Toronto. The Toronto concert was the band's first in the city and also included a live painting performance by artist Tamara Harutyunyan.

On April 30, Nemra won the Best Rock Artist or Band award at the Khazer Armenian Music Awards, organized by the Armenian National Music Academy.

On May 9, Nemra performed in Beirut, Lebanon, at a concert held at the "O" Club in Antelias that opened the 95th-anniversary celebrations of Hamazkayin Djemaran. More than 450 people attended.

On June 11, 2025, Nemra held a major solo concert at the Karen Demirchyan Complex (Hamalir) in Yerevan, Armenia, where the band presented its third studio album, The End of the Party. The album's eleven songs were written by Van and Vaspur Yeghiazaryan. At the concert, "I'm Afraid of Stars" (featuring Serj Tankian) was performed live for the first time.

On June 23, 2025, Nemra performed an open-air concert at Yerevan State University's Graduate Commencement Ceremony.

On July 4, 2025, Nemra performed as the special guest for Russian rock artist Zemfira at Hrazdan Stadium in Yerevan, Armenia, opening her concert with a 45-minute set.

On October 5, 2025, the band released the music video for "You Better Run", a single from The End of the Party.

=== 2026 ===
On 21 March 2026, Nemra performed as the special guest of Icelandic band Kaleo at the Karen Demirchyan Complex in Yerevan.

On 29 March 2026, the band won Best Rock Artist or Band at the Khazer Armenian Music Awards for the second consecutive year.

In May-June 2026 the band toured Europe, with dates in Tbilisi (16 May, its first concert there in seven years), Kraków (27 May), Budapest (30 May), Vienna (3 June, Wiener Stadthalle) and Brussels (7 June, a charity concert organised by SOAR in support of orphaned children in Armenia).

On 19 June 2026, Nemra gave a solo concert at Arev Arena in Yerevan.

In October 2026, Nemra performed in Germany for the first time: on 23 October at the Rock Café in Wiesbaden, and on 24 October at the Silcher-Saal of the Liederhalle in Stuttgart as part of the Armenian Cultural Days Stuttgart festival.

== Band members ==
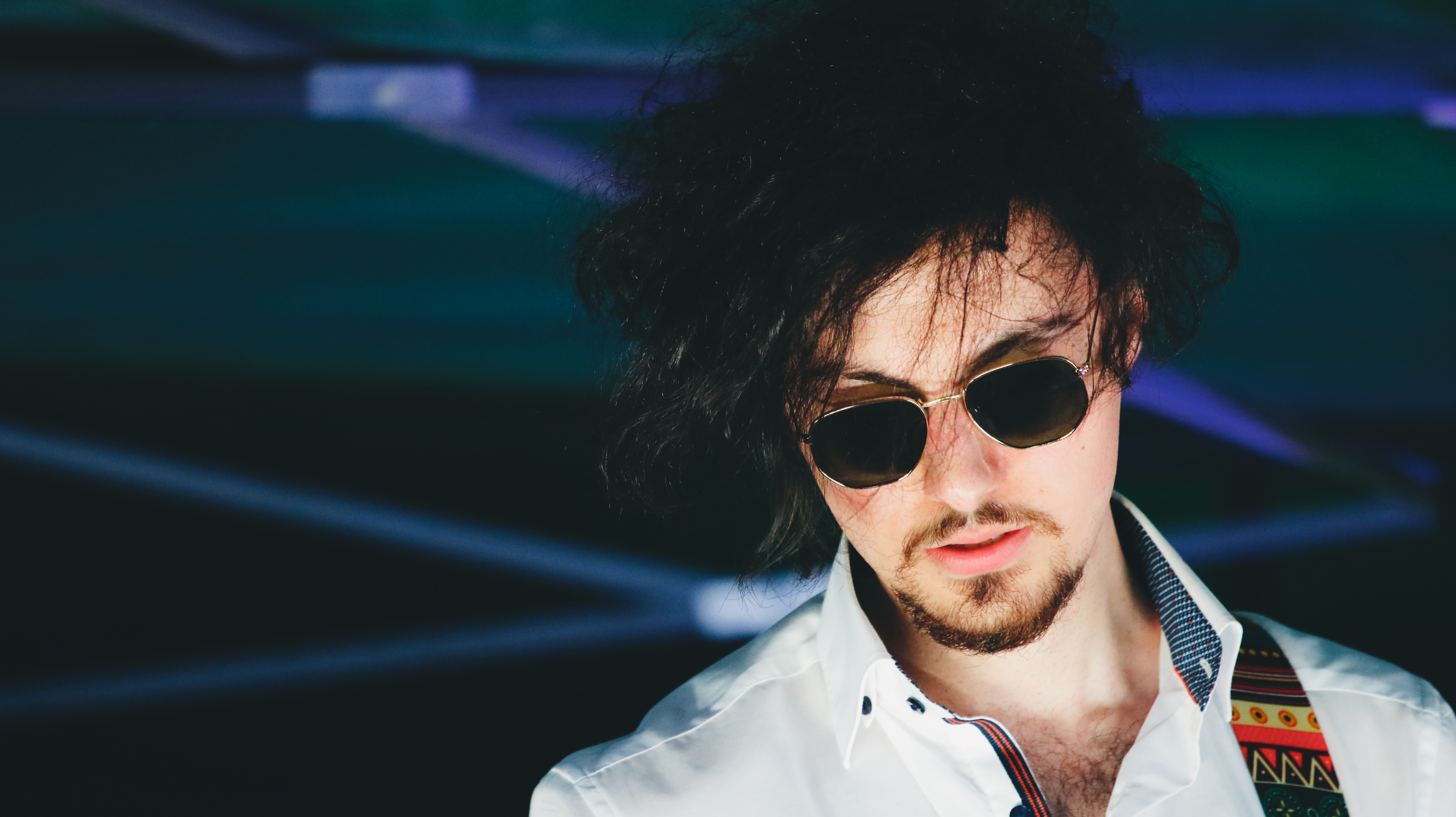
Van Yeghiazaryan

- Van Yeghiazaryan – (vocals, lead guitar), co-founder of the band. He was born on August 28, 1992, in Yerevan. At the age of 8, he was accepted to the Musical School after Sarajev with the first profession of violin, second; piano and third; flute. He learned guitar by himself in 2010. Van has studied at Armenian State University of Economics with the major of "Marketing and Business Management".
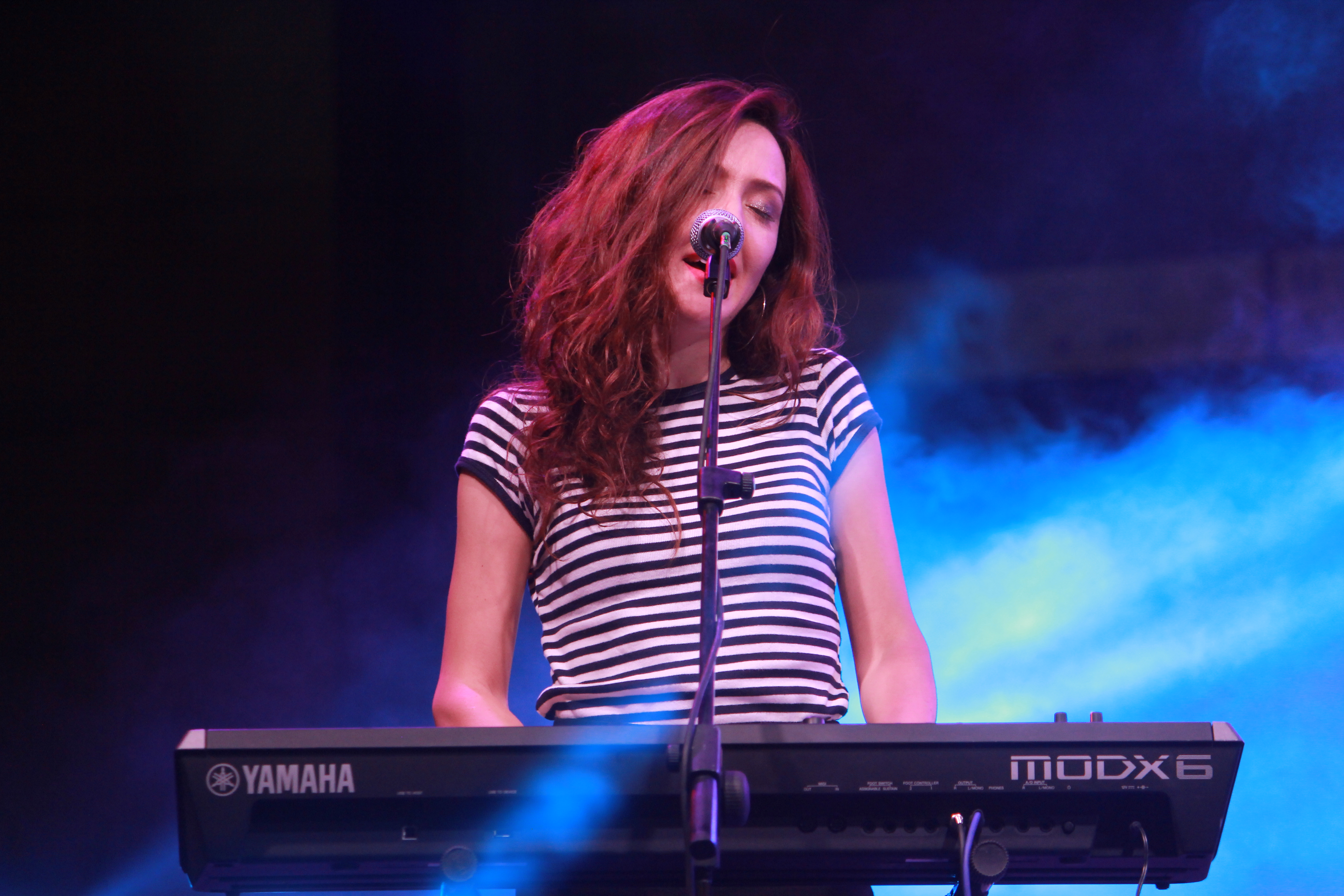
  Marianna Karakeyan
- Marianna Karakeyan – (piano, keyboards, backing vocals), co-founder of the band. She was born on August 5, 1988, in Yerevan. She has studied at the specialized music school of Tchaikovsky in Yerevan during the years 1994–2004 and at Yerevan State Conservatory with the major of piano during the years 2004–2010. She has a master's degree.

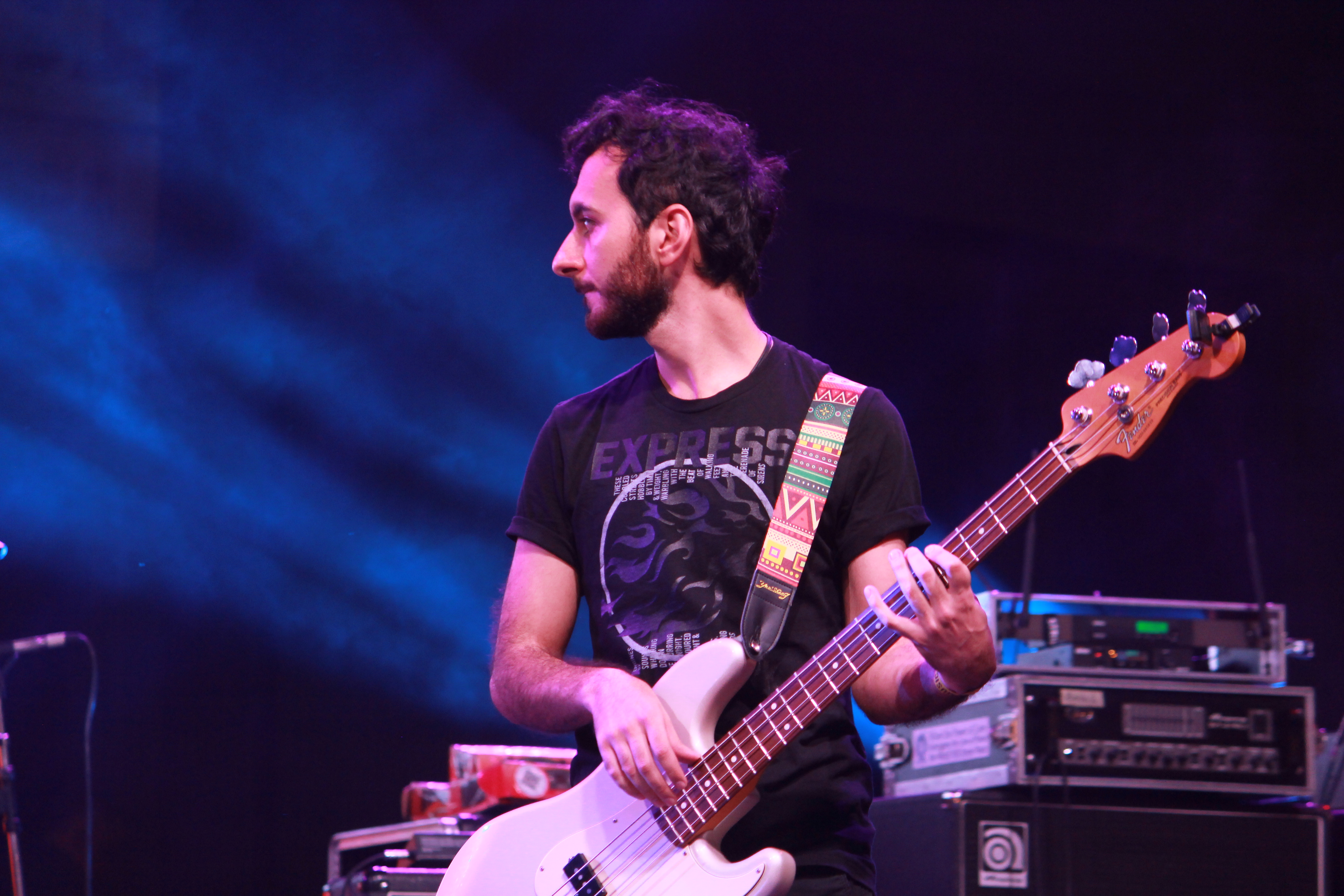
Vaspur Yeghiazaryan

- Vaspur Yeghiazaryan – (bass guitar, backing vocals), co-founder of the band. He was born on December 4, 1993. At the age of 6, he was accepted to Musical School after Sarajev with the first profession of violin, second; piano and third; flute. He has learned guitar by himself in 2011. He has studied at Yerevan State University with the major of Radio-physics during the years 2009–2013․
- Marek Zaborski – drummer

== Awards ==
Year	Award	Category	City	Result	Ref.
2018	Swallow Music Awards	Best Rock Band of the Year	Yerevan	Won	
2025	Khazer Armenian Music Awards	Best Rock Artist or Band	Yerevan	Won	
2026	Khazer Armenian Music Awards	Best Rock Artist or Band	Yerevan	Won	

== Discography ==
=== Studio albums ===
- Mubla (2016)
- Hmm (2019)
- The End of the Party (2025)

=== Extended Plays (EPs) ===
- Armenian (2024)

=== Music videos ===
Date	Title	Director
March 16, 2014	"Sad Reality"	Karen Amyan
July 14, 2014	"Dream"	Marisha Kazaryan
August 28, 2015	"Last Chance To Love" (unofficial music video)	Aram Karakhanyan
January 20, 2016	"Train Of Despair"	Ina Abrahamyan
June 15, 2016	"Feet In The River"	Areg Hovakimyan
July 8, 2016	"Leave Me Alone" (Nemra feat. Andre Simonian)	Mariam Gevorgyan
December 16, 2016	"Connection Lost"	Ina Abrahamyan
December 3, 2017	"Born in 94"	Arus Tigranyan
December 5, 2018	"Because"	Arus Tigranyan
December 21, 2018	"The past has passed"	Vaspur Yeghiazaryan
February 14, 2019	"Room N11"	Ina Abrahamyan
June 4, 2019	"Why"	
November 3, 2019	"Nare" (more than 14 million views on YouTube)	Mariam Gevorgyan
June 1, 2020	"Vana Chutik" (Lullaby)	
August 16, 2020	"She's Beautiful"	Mariam Gevorgyan
July 25, 2021	"Զիմ Խորոտիկ Յար"	Karen Amyan
September 11, 2021	"Daisy"	Mariam Gevorgyan
March 6, 2022	"Առնեմ Ելնեմ"	Mariam Gevorgyan
July 21, 2022	"Սև աչերով աղջիկ / Sev acherov aghchik"	Mariam Gevorgyan
January 15, 2023	"If you go"	Mariam Gevorgyan
July 2, 2023	"Look at birds"	Arthur Manukyan
August 25, 2023	"A Letter From Daisy"	Mariam Gevorgyan
March 24, 2024	"The Fool Moon"	Karen Amyan
November 23, 2024	"I'm Afraid of Stars" (ft. Serj Tankian)	Arthur Manukyan
May 23, 2025	"Չքնաղ Երազ"	Karen Amyan
October 5, 2025	"You Better Run"	Narek Hakobyanc
January 1, 2026	"My Stomach"	Narek Hakobyanc
May 23, 2026	"Արևիկ / Arevik" (ft. Gayane Hovhannisyan)	
August 21, 2026	"Ես փնտրել եմ քեզ / Es pntrel em qez"	Narek Hakobyanc
