= You Make Me Feel =

You Make Me Feel may refer to:

- You Make Me Feel (Bonfire album), 2009
- You Make Me Feel (Milosh album), 2004
- "You Make Me Feel" (AnnaGrace song), 2008
- "You Make Me Feel (Mighty Real)", song by Sylvester
- "You Make Me Feel...", song by Cobra Starship
- "(You Make Me Feel Like) A Natural Woman", song by Aretha Franklin, with many covers
- "You Make Me Feel", song by Kylie Minogue from the album Body Language
- "You Make Me Feel", song by Westlife from the album Coast to Coast
