= Swallow Music Awards =

Armenian annual national music awards ceremony

Swallow Music Awards / Ծիծեռնակ երաժշտական մրցանակաբաշխություն
- Awarded for: Excellence and outstanding achievement
- Location: Armenian National Academic Theatre of Opera and Ballet named after Alexander Spendiaryan
- Country: Armenia
- Presented by: Ministry of Culture of Armenia
- First award: 2017

Television/radio coverage
- Network: AMPTV

Swallow Music Awards (Armenian: Ծիծեռնակ երաժշտական մրցանակաբաշխություն, Tsitsernak yerazhshtakan mrcanakabashkhutiun) is an annual national music awards ceremony first held in Yerevan, Armenia, on 25 March 2017. The awards are created and sponsored by RA Ministry of Culture to appreciate and spur the activities of individuals and creators of various genres of Armenian musical art, as well as to display the significant achievements in the field of music to the broader layers of society. The awards consist of four parts: achievements in classical genre, folk genre, mass pop genre, and special/other awards. During the ceremony artists are given the awards designed by Armenian painter and designer Arman Nur. Each year, the award ceremony airs live on Public Television company of Armenia.

== Award process ==
Unlike other Armenian awards, such as the "Armenian Europe" Music Awards and "Pan Armenian" Entertainment Awards, which determine winners without any nominations, the Swallow Music Awards does have nominees and they are based on the applications that they submit beforehand. The award categories are determined if at least two applications have been received for that category. Classical genre awards are decided by a delegation headed by composer Tigran Mansurian. Folk genre awards are decided by a delegation headed by singer Ruben Matevosyan. Pop genre awards are determined by composer and professor Robert Amirkhanyan's commission.

== Award categories ==
=== Classical genre ===
- The Best Group (2017–present)
- The Best Musician/Performer (2017–present)
- The Best Instrumental Musician/Performer (2018–present)
- The Best Album (2017–present)
- The Best Concert Program (2017–all genres combined, 2018–specified)

=== Folk genre ===
- The Best Group (2017–present)
- The Best Musician/Performer (2017–present)
- The Best Instrumental Musician/Performer (2018–present)
- The Best Album (2017–present)
- The Best Concert Program (2017–all genres combined, 2018–specified)

=== Mass Pop Genre ===
- The Best (Fe)male singer (2017)
- The Best Female singer (2018–present)
- The Best Male singer (2018–present)
- The Best Rock Band (2017–present)
- The Best Jazz Band/Performer (2017)
- The Best Pop Band (2017–present)
- The Best Album (2017–present)
- The Hit of the Year (2017–present)
- The Best Concert Program (2017–all genres combined, 2018–specified)
- The Best Duet (2018–present)
- The Reveal of the Year (2018–present)

=== Other awards ===
- Not specified special awards

== Annual awards ==
=== 2017 edition ===
The 2017 Swallow awards were held at the Yerevan Opera Theatre in Yerevan on 25 March 2017. The artists could submit their applications from 1 to 28 February. Stephan Shakaryan was awarded a special prize for his outstanding contribution to Armenian composing art and Ralph Yirikian for always being on the side of culture. Levon Malkhasyan, Vache Sharafyan, Vahagn Hayrapetyan, Hover Choir, Sibil, State Youth Orchestra of Armenia, Hayastan Fund&National Philharmonic Orchestra of Armenia also obtained special awards for their important music programs implemented in 2016.

==== Classical awards ====
- The Best Group – Harutyunyan Quartet
- The Best Musician/Performer – Gevorg Hakobyan
- The Best Album – Old and New Yerevan. 2798+

==== Folk awards ====
- The Best Group – Shoghakn
- The Best Musician/Performer – Kamo Seyranyan
- The Best Album – Mokac Mountains (Hayrik Muradyan)

==== Mass Pop awards ====
- The Best (Fe)male singer – Marine Hakobyan (Marbi)
- The Best Rock Band – The Beautified Project
- The Best Pop Band – Detk boyband
- The Best Jazz Band/Performer – Mikayel Voskanyan and Friends
- The Best Album – Naghash
- The Hit of the Year – "LoveWave" (Iveta Mukuchyan)
- The Best Music Video – "A Letter to the Mother" (Նամակ մայրիկին) (Mihran Tsarukyan)

==== Special awards ====
- The Best Music Program – Canticle of Canticles (AMPTV)

=== 2018 edition ===
The 2018 edition of the awards were held at the same place on 31 March 2018. The hosts of the 2018 edition were Armenian presenters Avet Barseghyan and Nazeni Hovhannisyan. Iveta Mukuchyan was named the best female singer of the year, Erik was named the best male one. Nemra was named the best rock band of the year.

==== Classical awards ====
- The Best Music Program – Angry Justice (Ահեղ դատաստան) (Yerevan Opera Theatre)
- The Best Group – Hover choir
- The Best Musician/Performer – Liparit Avetisyan
- The Best Album – Alexsandr Harutyunyan: Complete piano works (Hayk Melikyan)
- The Best Instrumental Musician/Performer – Diana Adamyan (violin)

==== Folk awards ====
- The Best Music Program – Duduk Tribute Celebration (Դուդուկի մեծարման երեկո) (Kamo Seyranyan)
- The Best Group – State Orchestra of Folk Instruments of Gyumri
- The Best Musician/Performer – Vardan Badalyan
- The Best Album – I am remembering you (State Orchestra of Folk Instruments of Gyumri)
- The Best Instrumental Musician/Performer – Norayr Gaphoyan (duduk)

==== Pop awards ====
- The Best Female singer – Iveta Mukuchyan
- The Best Male singer – Erik
- The Best Rock Band – Nemra
- The Best Pop Band – The Voices of Artsakh
- The Best Album – Amazing and unusual (Զարմանալի և անսովոր) (YellowStons)
- The Hit of the Year – Lusin (Garik Papoyan & Sona Rubenyan)
- The Best Concert Program – Eternal City of Love (Hayko)
- The Best Duet – Aram Mp3 and 3.33
- The Discovery of the Year – Hakob Hakobyan & Arman Hovhannisyan
- The Best Music Video – "Eternal City of Love" (Hayko)

==== Special awards ====
- Sirusho
- Gaya Arzumanyan
- AMPTV
- Rita Sargsyan and Avet Barseghyan
- Artak Kirakosyan
- Artur Grigoryan

== Controversies ==
The rule that artists should submit their applications for some of the awards caused the dissatisfaction of several singers, such as Syuzanna Melqonyan, who stated "This is just offensive to the artist's musical career".
