= Woman (Rhye album) =

Studio album by Rhye
- Released: March 1, 2013
- Recorded: 2011–12
- Studio: Hannibal Studios (Santa Monica, California); Rummet (Copenhagen, Denmark)
- Genre: Alternative R&B; sophisti-pop; downtempo; soul
- Length: 35:48
- Label: Innovative Leisure; Loma Vista; Republic; Polydor
- Producer: Rhye

Rhye chronology
Woman (2013)	Blood (2018)

Singles from Woman
- 1. "Open" Released: February 7, 2012; 2. "The Fall" Released: December 10, 2012

Woman is the debut studio album by Canadian/Danish R&B duo Rhye. The album was released worldwide on March 1, 2013, by Polydor Records, except in North America where it was released on March 5 through Loma Vista Recordings, Innovative Leisure, and Republic Records. The album's release followed the singles "Open" and "The Fall", both of which appear on the album.

== Critical reception ==
Professional ratings
Aggregate scores
Source	Rating
AnyDecentMusic?	7.5/10
Metacritic	79/100
Review scores
Source	Rating
AllMusic	4/5 stars
Chicago Tribune	3.5/4 stars
The Guardian	4/5 stars
The Irish Times	3/5 stars
NME	5/10
Pitchfork	8.5/10
Rolling Stone	3.5/5 stars
Slant Magazine	4/5 stars
Spin	8/10
Uncut	8/10

Woman was very well received by critics, with many comparing the album's sound to the artist Sade. The album currently holds a 79/100 rating on Metacritic.

The album was named a longlisted nominee for the 2013 Polaris Music Prize on June 13, 2013.

== Track listing ==
All tracks are written by Mike Milosh and Robin Hannibal

No.	Title	Length
1.	"Open"	3:37
2.	"The Fall"	3:45
3.	"Last Dance"	3:27
4.	"Verse"	2:52
5.	"Shed Some Blood"	3:21
6.	"3 Days"	4:16
7.	"One of Those Summer Days"	4:33
8.	"Major Minor Love"	3:56
9.	"Hunger"	3:30
10.	"Woman"	2:40
Total length:		35:48

== Charts ==
=== Weekly charts ===
Chart (2013)	Peak positions
Belgian Albums (Ultratop Flanders)	22
Belgian Albums (Ultratop Wallonia)	145
Danish Albums (Hitlisten)	12
French Albums (SNEP)	146
UK Albums Chart (Official Charts Company)	143
US Billboard 200	55

=== Year-end charts ===
Chart (2013)	Positions
Belgian Albums (Ultratop Flanders)	197

== Personnel ==
Music

- Rhye – arranger, horn arrangements, instrumentation, vocals, string arrangements
- Thomas Drayton – bass
- Andreas Halberg – bass
- Elizabeth Lea – trombone, horn arrangements
- Tom Lea – viola, violin, string arrangements
- Rebekah Raff – harp
- August Rosenbaum – piano
- Itai Shapiro – guitar
- Todd Simon – flugelhorn, trumpet, horn arrangements
- Tracy Wannomae – clarinet, flute, saxophone, horn arrangements

Production

- Rhye – engineer, mixing, producer
- Tom Coyne – mastering
- Bjorn Gjessing – piano engineer
- Mads Oustrup – mixing

Artwork and Design

- Stuart Hardie – art direction, design
- Rachell Smith – photography
