= Rhye =

R&B musical project

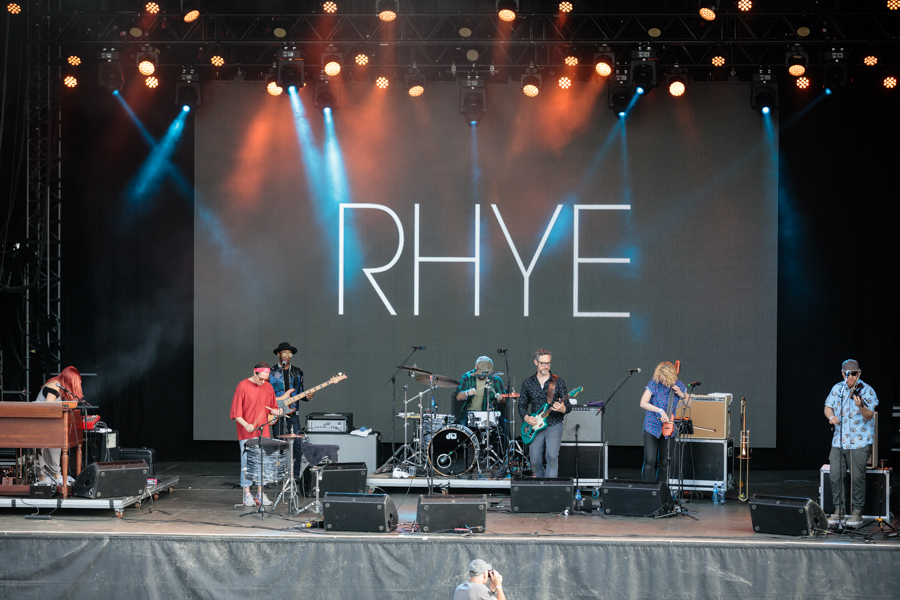
- Rhye performing in Oslo in 2018

Background information
- Origin: Toronto, Canada
- Genres: Alternative R&B, downtempo, soul
- Years active: 2010–present
- Label: Loma Vista Recordings
- Members: Milosh
- Past members: Robin Hannibal
- Website: www.rhyemusic.com

Rhye is an R&B musical project of Canadian singer Mike Milosh. It originally consisted of him and Danish instrumentalist Robin Hannibal. They released the singles "Open" and "The Fall" online without much detail, which led to speculation about the band. Their debut album, Woman, was released on March 4, 2013. In June 2013, the album was longlisted for the 2013 Polaris Music Prize. In 2017, it was reported that Robin Hannibal was no longer a member of Rhye and that the project had evolved into a music collective led by Milosh and focused around the associated live band. Their second album, Blood, was released on February 2, 2018, and was largely written, produced, and performed by Milosh.

In 2018, Rhye began an international tour to promote the album Blood.

== Members ==
- Michael Milosh was born in Toronto, Canada, and is an electronic musician and vocalist. He is a classically trained cellist. He moved to Berlin, Germany to pursue music as a vocalist and a producer. Professionally using the name Milosh, he signed with the record label Plug Research and released two albums, You Make Me Feel (2004), and Meme (2006). He also contributed the track "Then It Happened" to the Ghostly International/Williams Street album Ghostly Swim, which was released in 2008.
- Robin Hannibal (born Robin Braun) was a member of the Danish duo Quadron together with Coco Maja Hastrup Karshøj. They were also signed to the Plug Research label and released a self-titled album in July 2009. Hannibal was also part of a Danish electronica collective called Boom Clap Bachelors, who in early 2008 released the album Just Before Your Lips. He has collaborated with other artists such as Nobody Beats the Beats, Clemens, Jokeren, and L.O.C. Hannibal also launched two projects, Owusu & Hannibal and Parallel Dance Ensemble, and contributed to Szjerdene's "Lead the Way" and to Leon Ware's "Orchids for the Sun". In 2011, Quadron collaborated with American DJ and record producer Kaskade on the song "Waste Love" off his album Fire & Ice.

== History ==
In 2010, Hannibal was working on some Quadron material and got tipped off about Milosh's work through their common record label. He contacted Milosh, who was at the time living in Berlin, and asked him to fly to Copenhagen, Denmark to meet him. The two musicians spent a week together in the studio recording three tracks for their first collaboration.

Eventually, Hannibal moved to Los Angeles to pursue a career there. As it happened, Milosh had also gone to the States independently. Based on their earlier cooperation in Denmark, the two agreed to continue working together, forming the duo Rhye, initially as an internet-based mystery, posting several singles online, but without providing any background information or contact details. Their online postings for "Open" and "The Fall", both romantic soul-pop numbers, garnered attention and a following. The songs were accompanied by sensual and high-quality shot videos.

There was great interest as well as speculation amongst music journalists and reviewers about the group's identity. Discussions also ensued about Milosh's high and sigh-like contralto androgynous vocals. His voice and the band's instrumentation are likened to those of The xx.

In 2013, the band released its debut album, Woman.

During their 2014 tour, Rhye sold a poster printed for the Boston show containing cryptic text in Wingdings that read "Who is Rhye. Edward Bernays."

In 2017, Rhye collaborated with Bonobo on a track called "Break Apart" from his album Migration.

In June 2017, Rhye released the split single featuring the songs "Please" and "Summer Days".

In 2018, Rhye released their second album, Blood, to largely positive critical feedback. The cover art for the album features Milosh's naked girlfriend (a different woman from the one on the cover of Woman).

== Discography ==
=== Studio albums ===
List of studio albums, with selected chart positions
Title	Details	Peak chart positions				
Title	Details	BEL (FL)	DEN	FRA	UK	US
Woman	Released: March 5, 2013; Label: Innovative Leisure; Distribution: Polydor, Loma Vista; Formats: CD, LP, digital download	22	12	164	143	55
Blood	Released: February 2, 2018; Label: Loma Vista, Hostess; Distribution: Concord Music Group; Formats: CD, LP, digital download	10	38	80	—	118
Spirit	Released: May 10, 2019; Label: Loma Vista; Distribution: Concord Music Group; Formats: LP, digital download	160	—	—	—	—
Home	Released: January 22, 2021; Label: Loma Vista; Distribution: Concord Music Group; Formats: CD, LP, digital download	40	—	—	—	—
"—" denotes a recording that did not chart or was not released in that territory.

=== EPs ===
- The Fall (Remixes) (2012)
- Passing (2023)

=== Singles ===
- "Please" (2017)
- "Taste" (2017)
- "Hymn" (2018)
- "Needed" (2019)
- "Beautiful" (2020)
- "Helpless" (2020)
- "Black Rain" (2020)
- "A Quiet Voice" (2023)

== Videography ==
=== Music videos ===
Title	Year	Director(s)	Notes
"The Fall"	2012	Daniel Kragh-Jacobsen	
"Open"	2012	Jennifer Nies	original version
"Open"	2013	Daniel Kragh-Jacobsen	second version
"Please"	2017	Michael Milosh	
"Count to Five"	2018	Michael Milosh, Geneviève Medow Jenkins	
"Song for You"	2018	Michael Milosh, Geneviève Medow Jenkins	
"Phoenix"	2018	Michael Milosh, Geneviève Medow Jenkins	
"Black Rain"	2020	Sam Taylor-Johnson	
