= Home (Rhye album) =

Studio album by Rhye
- Released: January 22, 2021
- Length: 47:12
- Label: Loma Vista
- Producer: Michael Milosh

Rhye chronology
Spirit (2019)	Home (2021)

Home is the fourth studio album by Canadian artist Milosh, under his project Rhye. It was released on January 22, 2021, under Loma Vista Recordings.

== Critical reception ==
Professional ratings
Aggregate scores
Source	Rating
AnyDecentMusic?	7.1/10
Metacritic	74/100
Review scores
Source	Rating
AllMusic	4/5 stars
Beats Per Minute	64%
Clash	8/10
DIY	3.5/5 stars
Exclaim!	7/10
The Independent	4/5 stars
Pitchfork	6.6/10
PopMatters	7/10
Rolling Stone	3.5/5 stars

Home was generally well received by music critics, with the album holding a rating of 74 out of 100 on Metacritic, indicating "generally favorable reviews". According to Metacritic, Home was the 44th best rated album of 2021.

Reviewing the album for Pitchfork, Zach Schonfeld gave the album a positive review, stating: "Rhye leader Michael Milosh remains king of the most respectable horny music possible. His new album testifies to those talents without calling too much attention to itself." Jem Aswad of Variety summarised that "Home is bookended with a musical tactic that is both perfect and obvious [...] But as with everything Rhye, it's all in service of Milosh's crystalline voice."

== Track listing ==
No.	Title	Writer(s)	Length
1.	"Intro"	Mike Milosh	1:30
2.	"Come in Closer"	Milosh; Roland LeFox	3:36
3.	"Beautiful"	Milosh; Itai Shapira	4:21
4.	"Safeword"	Milosh; Ian Meltzer; James Alan Ghaleb	2:54
5.	"Hold You Down"	Milosh; Daniel Stanfill; Nate Mercereau	4:46
6.	"Need a Lover"	Milosh; Joel Shearer	3:36
7.	"Helpless"	Milosh; Shapira; Brian London; Nathaniel Brown	3:41
8.	"Black Rain"	Milosh; LeFox	3:51
9.	"Sweetest Revenge"	Milosh; LeFox; Genevieve Medow-Jenkins	4:26
10.	"My Heart Bleeds"	Milosh; Shapira; Brown	3:43
11.	"Fire"	Milosh	3:32
12.	"Holy"	Milosh; Ben Schwier	4:43
13.	"Outro"	Milosh	2:29
Total length:			47:12

Japanese bonus tracks
No.	Title	Length
14.	"Beautiful" (Deconstructed Mix)	4:51
15.	"Helpless" (Live)	5:10
Total length:		57:14

== Charts ==
Chart performance for Home
Chart (2021)	Peak position
Belgian Albums (Ultratop Flanders)	40
Belgian Albums (Ultratop Wallonia)	83
German Albums (Offizielle Top 100)	96
Lithuanian Albums (AGATA)	93
Swiss Albums (Schweizer Hitparade)	45
