= Blood (Rhye album) =

Studio album by Rhye
- Released: February 2, 2018
- Studio: Decibelle; Studio Milosh; King Henry; Revival at the Complex; Westpoint; The Dwelling
- Length: 42:00
- Label: Loma Vista
- Producer: Thomas Bartlett; King Henry; Michael Milosh

Rhye chronology
Woman (2013)	Blood (2018)	Spirit (2019)

Professional ratings
Aggregate scores
Source	Rating
Metacritic	71/100
Review scores
Source	Rating
The 405	(8/10)
AllMusic	3/5 stars
Clash	8/10
Exclaim!	(9/10)
The Line of Best Fit	7.5/10
NME	4/5 stars
Pitchfork	6.3/10

Blood is the second studio album by Canadian/Danish R&B duo Rhye released in February 2018 under Loma Vista Recordings.

== Release ==
On October 31, 2017, Rhye released the first single from the album, "Taste". The second single "Count to Five" was released on December 11, 2017, along with the announcement of the new album. On February 15, 2018, Rhye released the music video to "Song For You".

== Tour ==
In October 2017, Rhye announced a European tour for February 2018, starting in Mexico City, and finishing in April 2018 in England.

== Critical reception ==
Blood was met with "generally favorable" reviews from critics. At Metacritic, which assigns a weighted average rating out of 100 to reviews from mainstream publications, this release received an average score of 71, based on 19 reviews. Aggregator Album of the Year gave the release a 73 out of 100 based on a critical consensus of 15 reviews.

=== Accolades ===
Accolades for
Publication	Accolade	Rank
The A.V. Club	The A.V. Club's Best Albums of 2018 – Mid-Year	N/A
Esquire	Esquire's Top 50 Albums of 2018	9
KCRW	KCRW's Top 10 Albums of 2018	10
Uproxx	Uproxx's Top 50 Albums of 2018 – Mid-Year	45

== Track listing ==
Track listing adapted from Tidal.

No.	Title	Music	Length
1.	"Waste"	Michael Milosh; Benjamin Schweir	3:31
2.	"Taste"	Milosh; Henry Allen	3:45
3.	"Feel Your Weight"	Milosh; Schweir; Itai Shapira	3:09
4.	"Please"	Milosh; Thomas Bartlett	3:35
5.	"Count to Five"	Milosh; Shapira	3:28
6.	"Song for You"	Milosh; Shapira; Justin Parker	3:58
7.	"Blood Knows"	Milosh; Nate Mercereau	3:30
8.	"Stay Safe"	Milosh; Schwier	4:52
9.	"Phoenix"	Milosh	4:34
10.	"Softly"	Milosh; Bartlett	3:37
11.	"Sinful"	Milosh	4:02
Total length:			42:00

Japan bonus track
No.	Title	Length
12.	"Hymn"	3:43
Total length:		45:50

== Personnel ==
Credits adapted from AllMusic.

Musicians

- Michael Milosh – lead vocalist, drums, engineer
- Claire Courchene – cello, trombone
- Nate Mercereau – bass, guitar
- Tamar Osborn – clarinet
- Justin Parker – guitar
- Paul Pfisterer – bass
- Benjamin Schwier – keyboard
- Leah Zeger – violin
- Thomas Lea – violin

Production

- Thomas Bartlett – engineer, producer
- Patrick Dillett – mixer
- Itai Shapira – engineer
- J.J. Wiesler – engineer
- Carrie Smith – design
- King Henry – engineer, bass, keyboards
- Joe LaPorta – mastering

== Charts ==
Chart (2018)	Peak position
Belgian Albums (Ultratop Flanders)	10
Belgian Albums (Ultratop Wallonia)	76
Canadian Albums (Billboard)	60
French Albums (SNEP)	74
Danish Albums (Hitlisten)	38
German Albums (Offizielle Top 100)	62
Japanese Albums (Oricon)	80
Dutch Albums (Album Top 100)	54
Portuguese Albums (AFP)	30
Swiss Albums (Schweizer Hitparade)	26
US Billboard 200	118

== Release history ==
Region	Date	Format	Label	Catalogue
US	February 2, 2018	CD; digital download; streaming; LP	Loma Vista	LVR00317
Japan	February 2, 2018	CD; digital download; streaming; LP	Hostess Entertainment	HSU-10176
Canada	February 2, 2018	CD; digital download; streaming; LP	Last Gang Records	Q101885
