= Spirit (Rhye album) =

Studio album by Rhye
- Released: May 10, 2019
- Length: 27:38
- Label: Loma Vista

Rhye chronology
Blood (2018)	Spirit (2019)	Home (2021)

Professional ratings
Aggregate scores
Source	Rating
Metacritic	67/100
Review scores
Source	Rating
AllMusic	2.5/5 stars
Exclaim!	8/10
Pitchfork	6.6/10

Spirit is the third studio album by Canadian musician Milosh, under his project Rhye. It was released May 10, 2019 under Loma Vista Recordings.

== Critical reception ==
According to the review aggregator Metacritic, Spirit received "generally favorable reviews" based on a weighted average score of 67 out of 100 from 4 critic scores.

== Track listing ==
Spirit track listing
No.	Title	Length
1.	"Dark"	1:27
2.	"Needed"	5:18
3.	"Malibu Nights"	1:55
4.	"Patience" (featuring Ólafur Arnalds)	4:14
5.	"Green Eyes"	2:18
6.	"Wicked Dreams"	4:31
7.	"Awake"	3:44
8.	"Save Me"	4:11
Total length:		27:38

== Charts ==
Chart performance for Spirit
Chart (2019)	Peak position
Belgian Albums (Ultratop Flanders)	160
