= Kamo Seyranyan =

Kamo Seyranyan (Armenian: Կամո Սեյրանյան; born February 5, 1979), is an Armenian duduk player. In 2012, Seyranyan was awarded with the title of Honored Artist of Armenia. He has also won 2 Swallow awards in the folk category; one for best musician/performer (2017) and the other one for the best musical project (Duduk Tribute Celebration, 2018).
