= Jet Lag (Milosh album) =

Studio album by Milosh
- Released: November 26, 2013
- Genre: Electronic
- Length: 45:01
- Label: Deadly
- Producer: Mike Milosh, Alexa Nikolas

Milosh chronology
III (2008)	Jet Lag (2013)

Professional ratings
Aggregate scores
Source	Rating
Metacritic	74/100
Review scores
Source	Rating
Allmusic	4/5 stars
Filter Magazine	81%
Spin Magazine	7/10
Pitchfork Media	6/10

Jet Lag is the fourth studio album by solo artist Milosh. It was released in November 2013 under Deadly Records, and produced by himself and his former wife Alexa Nikolas.

== Track list ==
No.	Title	Length
1.	"Do You Want What I Need"	5:27
2.	"Hear In You"	3:40
3.	"Skipping"	3:03
4.	"Don't Call It"	3:23
5.	"Jetlag"	3:47
6.	"Stakes Ain't High"	3:47
7.	"Hold Me"	8:13
8.	"Slow Down"	3:20
9.	"Water"	5:12
10.	"This Time"	5:09

== Personnel ==
- Michael Milosh – composer
- Charlie Cole – bass
- Paul Pfisterer – guitar
- Tim Shia – drums
- João Carvalho – mastering
- Matt de Jong – design
