= Milosh =

Canadian musician (born 1976)

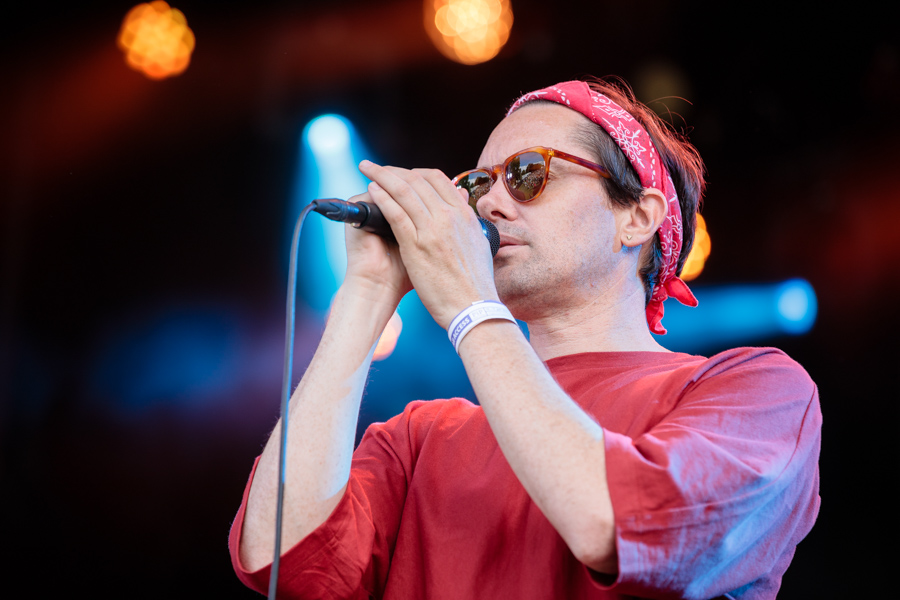
- Milosh performing in 2018

Background information
- Born: Michael Milosh; 1976 (age 49–50)
- Origin: Toronto, Canada
- Genre: Electronic
- Occupation: Musician
- Labels: Plug Research; Studio !K7
- Member of: Rhye
- Spouse: Alexa Nikolas (m. 2012; div. 2016)
- Website: milosh.bandcamp.com

Michael Milosh (born 1976), known professionally as Milosh, is a Canadian electronic musician from Toronto, who is currently based in Los Angeles, California.

== Career ==
Milosh started learning classical cello at age three, later taking up drumming. He studied jazz and vocals at university.

The Los Angeles–based record label Plug Research released two of Milosh's albums, including 2004's You Make Me Feel and 2006's Meme. In 2008, he contributed the track "Then It Happened" to the Ghostly International/Williams Street album Ghostly Swim, which was released as a free digital download. Later that year, he released his third record, iii, with Plug Research in the US and Studio !K7 in the EU. In 2009, he collaborated with Paul Pfisterer on the album New Territory.

In 2010, Milosh formed the band Rhye with Robin Hannibal, and they released their debut album, Woman, in March 2013. Milosh released his fourth solo record, Jetlag, in November 2013, on his own label, Deadly. In July 2017, Rhye issued a single titled "Please", and Milosh announced on social media the release of a second album later that year. In February 2018, Rhye released a follow-up to Woman, titled Blood.

== Sexual abuse allegations ==
In March 2021, Milosh was accused of grooming and sexual abuse by his ex-wife, Alexa Nikolas. She alleged Milosh began grooming her for a sexual relationship when she was 16 years old and he was 33, and that during their marriage, he assaulted her. In August 2021, Nikolas filed a lawsuit against Milosh for sexual battery, gender-based violence, and intentional infliction of emotional distress. The musician has denied the claims. In an interview with Rolling Stone magazine, he referred to Nikolas' claims as "horrific and spiteful lies". He countersued at the end of August 2021, alleging the malicious filing of a frivolous case against him. Nikolas dropped the lawsuit against Milosh in March 2022, and Milosh's case was stricken in February 2023.

== Discography ==
=== Solo ===
- You Make Me Feel (2004)
- Meme (2006)
- iii (2008)
- Jetlag (2013)

=== with Rhye ===
- The Fall (Remixes) (2012)
- Woman (2013)
- Blood (2018)
- Blood Remixed (2018)
- Spirit (2019)
- Home (2021)

=== with Paul Pfisterer ===
- New Territory (2009)

=== Contributions ===
- "Break Apart" Migration (Bonobo, 2017)

=== Compilation appearances ===
- "Then It Happened" Ghostly Swim (2008)
