= Lanjazat =

Village in Ararat, Armenia

Lanjazat Լանջազատ
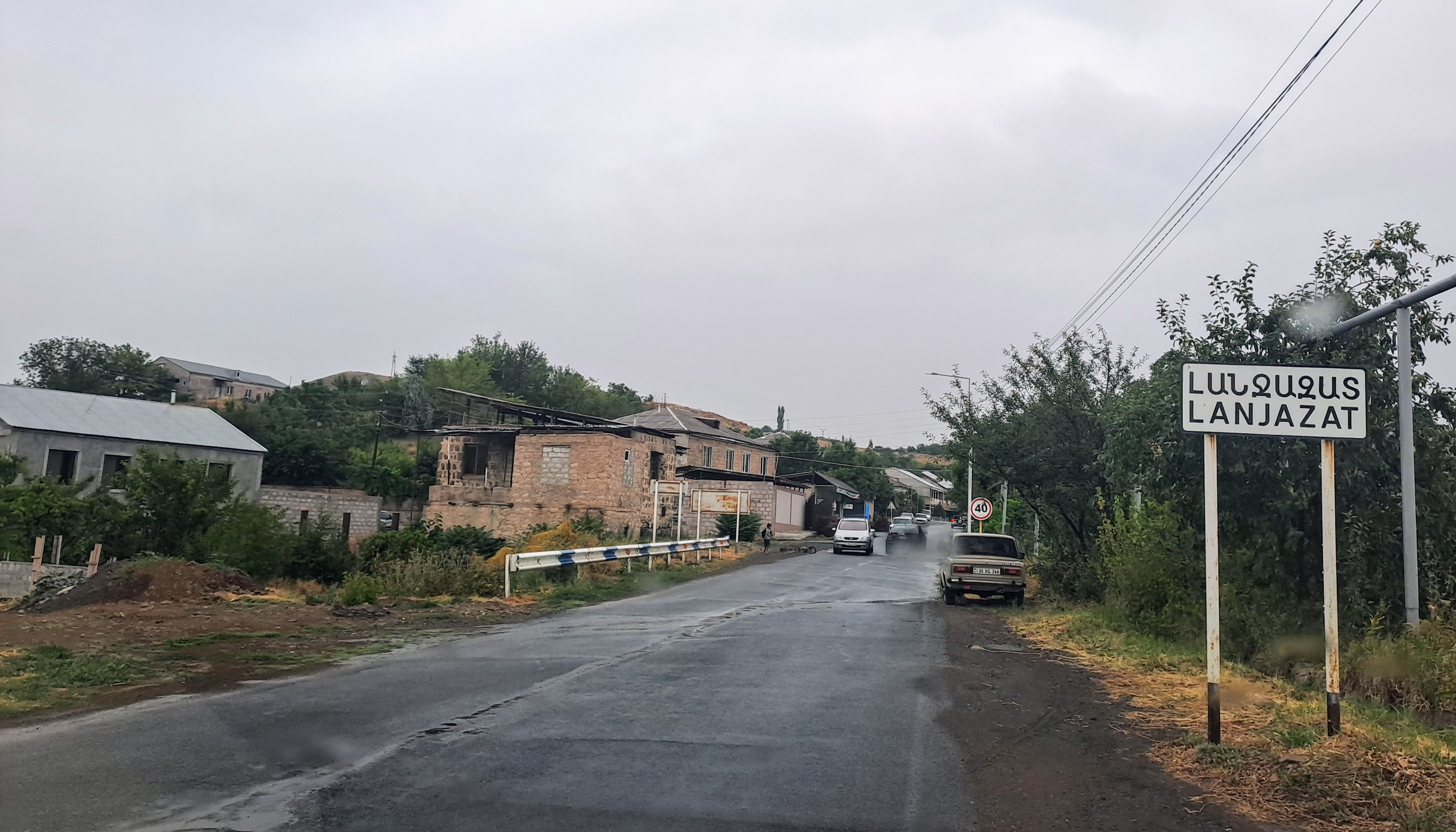
- Lanjazat in 2025

- Location within Armenia Location within Ararat
- Coordinates: 40°03′41″N 44°34′40″E
- Country: Armenia
- Province: Ararat
- Municipality: Artashat

Population (2011)
  - Total: 1,338
- Time zone: UTC+4
  - Summer (DST): UTC+5

Lanjazat (Armenian: Լանջազատ) is a village in the Artashat Municipality of the Ararat Province of Armenia.
