= Arman Nur =

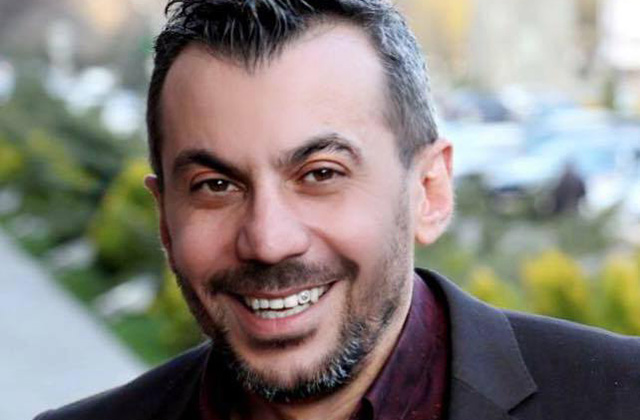
- Arman Nur in 2016
- Born: Arman Davtyan; October 11, 1971 (age 55); Yerevan, ASSR, USSR
- Education: Toros Roslin Institute of Applied Art, Faculty of Metal Design
- Notable work: "The Fly", "Genius", "Sculpture of Reader"
- Awards: Gold Medal of the Ministry of Culture of RA (2012), Movses Khorenatsi Honorary Medal of the President of the Republic of Armenia (2013), Gold Medal of the International Contemporary Art Biennale of Florence (2017)

Arman Nur (Armenian: Արման Նուռ; born October 11, 1971) is an Armenian designer, jeweler, sculptor, and painter. In 2012, Nur was awarded the Armenian Ministry of Culture's Gold Medal, and in 2013, he received the President of Armenia's Movses Khorenatsi medal.

== Life and education ==
Arman Nur was born in Yerevan on October 11, 1971. He studied at the ceramics department of the Yerevan Children's Aesthetics Development Center and at the Toros Roslin Institute of Applied Art, Faculty of Metal Design. He participated in courses at the Moscow Institute of Gemology for the study of precious stones, including identification and research. Nur also took classes at the Miami International University of Art and Design.

In 1999, Nur founded the "Nur Design" creative studio. In 2015, he founded the Nur Art Gallery Yerevan.

== Creative activities ==
=== Exhibitions ===
==== Solo exhibitions ====
- 2018 “Diagram”, exhibition of paintings, graphics, jewelries and sculptures in Porta Coeli International Art Gallery and Academy, Venosa, Italy.
- 2018 “Aratta collection”, exhibition of jewelries in Pirro del Balzo Castel, Sala Gesualdo, Venosa, Italy.
- 2018 The Fly, multimedia exhibition, Cafesjian Center for the Arts, Yerevan, Armenia.
- 2016 YerevanUHI exhibition dedicated to Armenian women, Yerevan History Museum, Armenia.
- 2008 Aratta collection exhibition, VDNKh – The Exhibition of Achievements of National Economy, Moscow, Russia.
- 2007 Aratta, Collection of jewelry symbolizing 12 cities of historic Armenia, Komitas Chamber Music House, Yerevan, Armenia.
- 2002 February, Exhibitions in Moscow and St. Petersburg, Russia.
- 2001 October, Exhibition in Yerevan, Armenia.

==== Group exhibitions ====
- 2020 February, Art Capital Show 2020 At Paris Grand Palais, Paris, France.
- 2019 August, Art Nocturne Knocke, Knokke, Belgium.
- 2019 July iGB Live! Amsterdam RAI, Europaplein, presentation of game application “The Fly” dedicated to “The Fly” project, Amsterdam, Netherlands.
- 2019 June, Second International Sculpture Symposium, as Committee member and participant, Aparan, Armenia.
- 2018 December, Bibart 2018/2019 International Art Biennale, Bari, Italy.
- 2018 October, International Sculpture Symposium, Sharm El Sheikh, Egypt.
- 2017 October, International Biennale of Contemporary Art in Florence, first prize, the Lorenzo il Magnifico Gold Award.
- 2011 April, “Aratta”. Opening Ceremony of Georgian Fashion Week (special guest). Tbilisi, Georgia.
- 2010 September, “Aratta”. "World Expo". Shanghai, China.
- 2008 October, “Aratta”. Opening Ceremony of Ukrainian Fashion Week (special guest). Kiev, Ukraine.
- 2009 August, “Aratta” performance. Venice, Italy.
- 2007 September, “Aratta”. Russian Fashion Week. Moscow, Russia. The Highest prize award.
- 2001 September, "YUVELIR 2001" International Exhibition. Moscow, Russia. “The Best Jewelry” prize award.

==== Joint Projects ====
- 2019 June, Second International Sculpture Symposium, as Committee member, Aparan, Armenia.
- 2019 February, ICE London 2019 presentation of game application “The Fly” dedicated to “The Fly” project, London, UK.
- 2018 November, World Youth Forum, Sharm El Sheikh, Egypt.
- 2018 October, International Sculpture Symposium, Sharm El Sheikh, Egypt.
- 2018 May, First International Sculpture Symposium, Aparan, Armenia.
- 2015 April, “Gallery 100” (dedicated to the 100th anniversary of the Armenian Genocide). Joint performance with Lilit Margaryan. Yerevan, Armenia.
- 2006 June, Fashion& jewellery joint show with Zatik Fashion Studio. Moscow, Russia.
- 2005 January, Fashion& jewellery joint show with Zatik Fashion Studio. Théâtre le Temple, Paris, France.

=== Artworks ===
- The Reader - а monument located near Khnko-Aper National Children's Library, Yerevan, installed in 2013.
- Childhood - а sculpture located in the garden of the Hematology Center, installed in 2017.
- Seven Springs - fountain boards in Republic Square, Yerevan, installed in 2010.
- Let It Be Light - the sculpture used for the Ecumenical Prize of the Golden Apricot International Film Festival.
- Swallow - the sculpture used for the "Swallow" National Music Awards.
- Fly - the sculpture which was awarded the Lorenzo Il Magnifico Gold Medal of the 2017 Florence Contemporary Art Biennale.
- Queen Satenik's jewelry box - a collection of jewelry.
- Jesus - a sculpture which won the "Critics' Award" in Bibart 2018/2019 International Art Biennale, Bari, Italy.

== Awards ==
During his artistic career, Nur has received a number of awards from Armenia and abroad. In 1994, Nur was awarded the first prize at the World Exhibition "Jeweler 1994". In Moscow at the Jeweler 2001 International Exhibition, he won first prize for "Best Jewelry". He also won the first prize at the "Jeweler 2005" Jewelry and Watches International Exhibition, for the set "Color of Love". At the Russian Fashion Week 2007, Nur was awarded the Highest Award.

In 2012, Nur was awarded the Golden Medal of the Ministry of Culture of Armenia and the Movses Khorenatsi Honorary Medal of the President of Armenia in 2013.

In October 2017, Arman Nur's sculptures Fly and Evolution were awarded the first prize, the Lorenzo il Magnifico Gold Medal at the International Contemporary Art Biennale of Florence, Italy.

In January 2019, Arman Nur's sculpture "Jesus" won the "Critics Award" in Bibart 2018/2019 International Art Biennale, Bari, Italy.

== Catalogues ==
- Diagram, Arman Nur, 2018, Yerevan - Nur Art Gallery (Armenia) cooperation with Porta Coeli International Art Gallery and Academy, Study Centre for Mediterranean culture (Italy).
- The Fly, Arman Nur, 2018, Yerevan - Nur Art Gallery (Armenia) cooperation with Cafesjian Center for the Arts (Armenia).
- Nur, 2015, Yerevan - Nur Art Gallery (Armenia).
- Contemporary Treasures on the 40th Parallel North. Armenia Showcases Italian Art from Basilicata, 2018, Venosa - Porta Coeli International Art Gallery and Academy, Study Centre for Mediterranean culture (Italy). Pageս 16, 17.
- Florence Biennale, International Biennial of Contemporary Art XIth Edition, Earth Creativity & Sustainability, 2017 Firenze, Fortezza Da Basso, ISBN 9788868741778, page 406.
- A’Design Award & Competition, Winner Designs 2017-2018, Award Winning Product Design, ISBN 978-88-97977-28-5 2018, Italy, page 374.

== Gallery ==
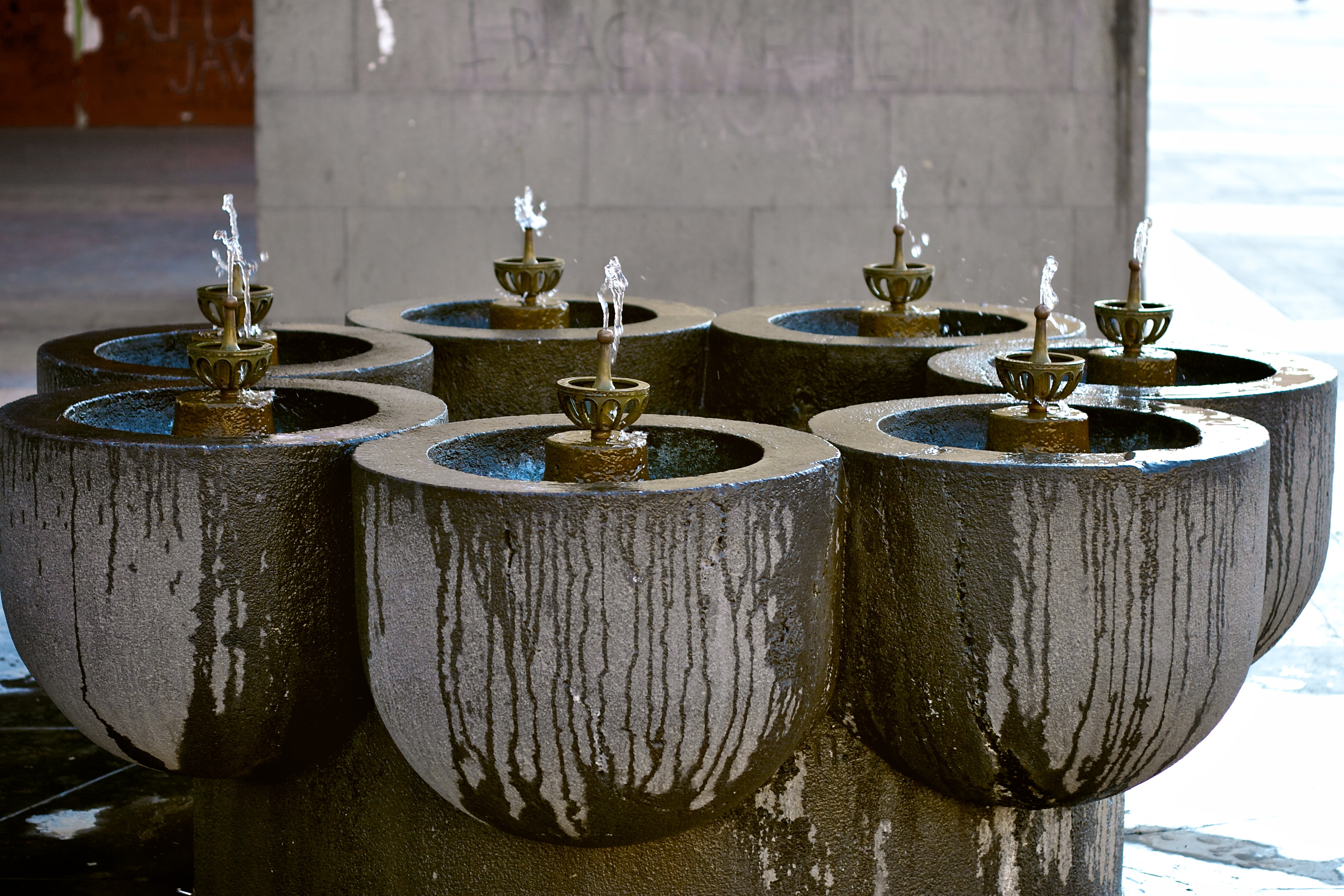
Յոթաղբյուր

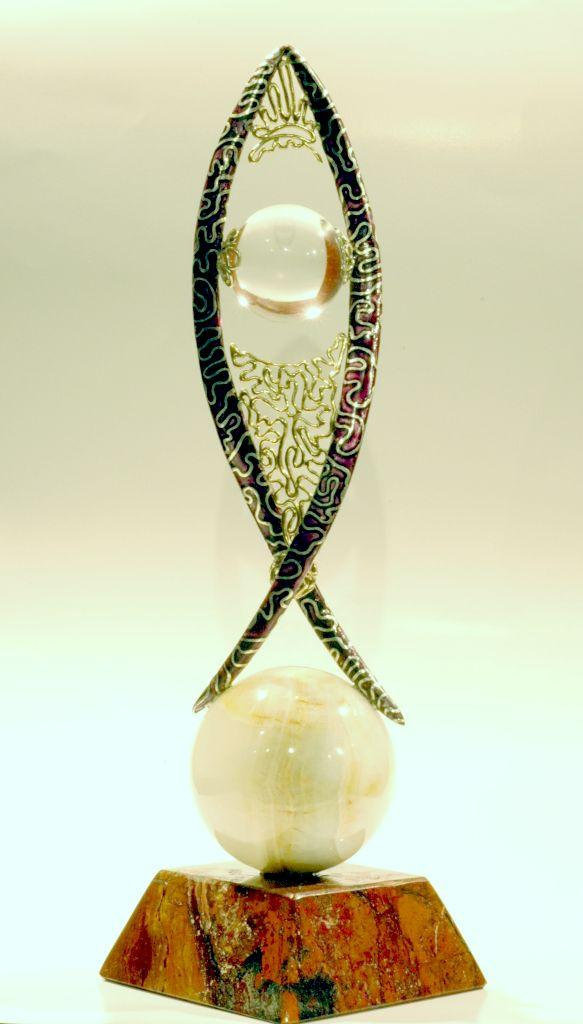
Եղիցի լույս

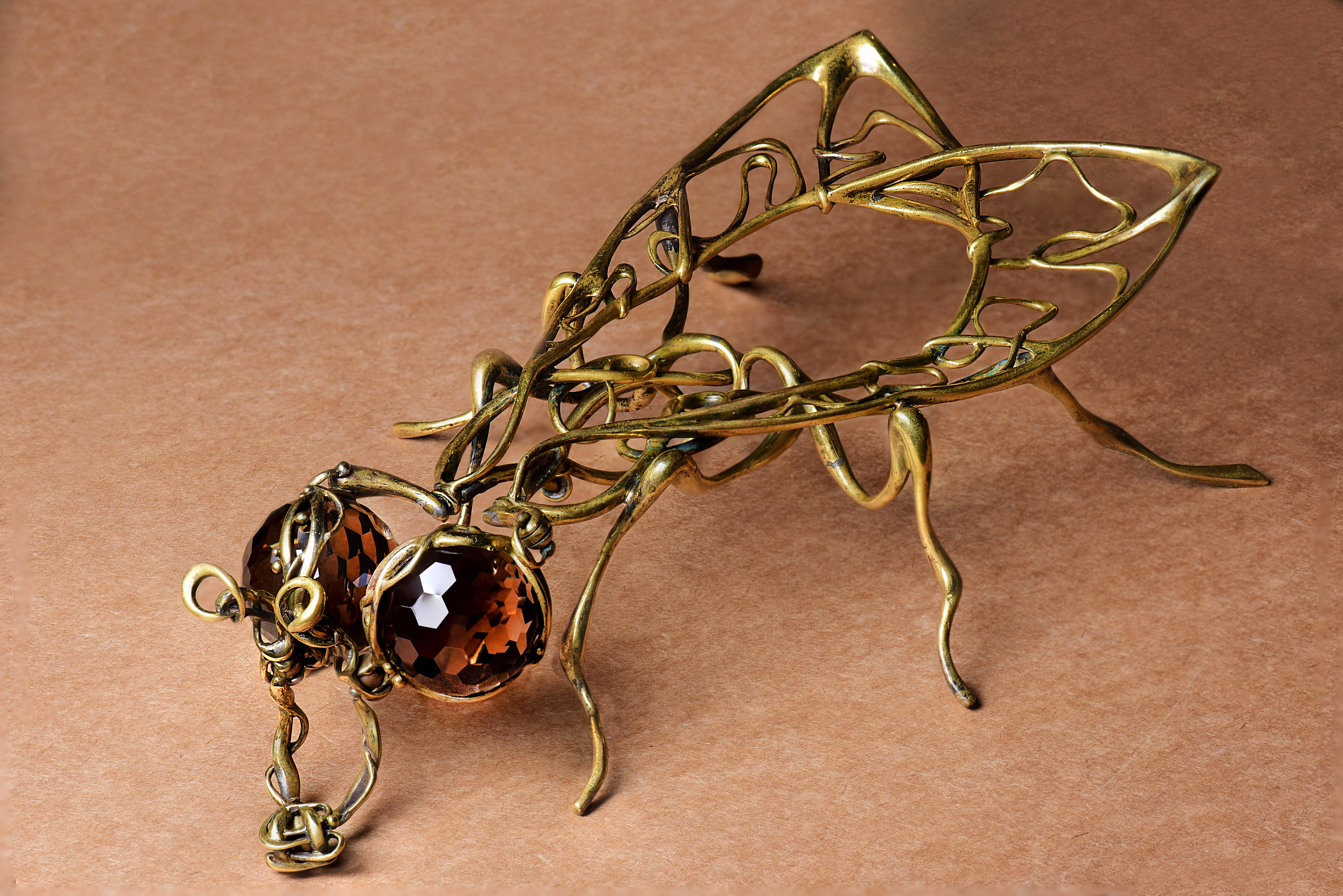
Ճանճ

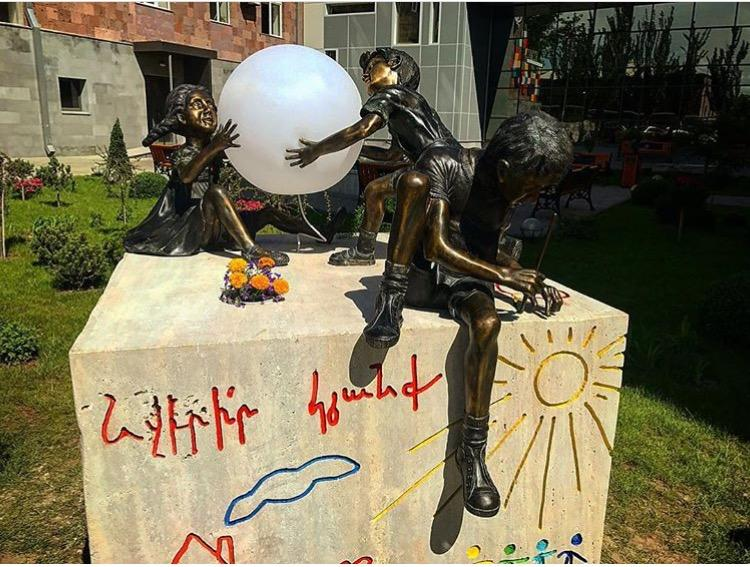
Մանկություն
