= You Make Me Feel (Milosh album) =

Studio album by Milosh
- Released: May 18, 2004
- Genre: Electronic
- Label: Plug Research

Milosh chronology
You Make Me Feel	Meme

Professional ratings
Review scores
Source	Rating
Stylus Magazine	(B−)

You Make Me Feel is the debut album of Canadian electronic musician Milosh. It was released on May 18, 2004, by Plug Research.

== Track listing ==
1. "You Make Me Feel" 4:43
2. "Your Taste" 3:24
3. "Simple People" 4:16
4. "Push" 3:18
5. "Creepy" 3:50
6. "Something Good" 3:02
7. "The Sky Is Grey" 5:41
8. "Your Voice" 3:36
9. "Do You Like Me" 3:14
10. "Time Steals the Day" 3:42
11. "Frozen Pieces" 4:21
