= Iceland in the Eurovision Song Contest 2015 =

- Eurovision Song Contest 2015
- Participating broadcaster: Ríkisútvarpið (RÚV)
- Country: Iceland
- Selection process: Söngvakeppnin 2015
- Selection date: 14 February 2015

Competing entry
- Song: "Unbroken"
- Artist: María Ólafs
- Songwriters: Pálmi Ragnar Ásgeirsson; Ásgeir Orri Ásgeirsson; Sæþór Kristjánsson; María Ólafsdóttir

Placement
- Semi-final result: Failed to qualify (15th)

Participation chronology

Iceland was represented at the Eurovision Song Contest 2015 with the song "Unbroken" written by Pálmi Ragnar Ásgeirsson, Ásgeir Orri Ásgeirsson, Sæþór Kristjánsson and María Ólafsdóttir. The song was performed by María Ólafs. The Icelandic entry for the 2015 contest in Vienna, Austria was selected through the national final Söngvakeppnin 2015, organised by the Icelandic broadcaster Ríkisútvarpið (RÚV). The selection consisted of two semi-finals and a final, held on 31 January, 7 February and 14 February 2015, respectively. Six songs competed in each semi-final with the top three as selected by a public televote alongside a jury wildcard advancing to the final. In the final, the winner was selected over two rounds of voting: the first involved a 50/50 combination of jury voting and public televoting, which reduced the seven competing entries to two superfinalists and the second round selected the winner exclusively through public televoting. "Unbroken" performed by María Ólafs emerged as the winner after gaining 55.89% of the public vote.

Iceland was drawn to compete in the second semi-final of the Eurovision Song Contest which took place on 21 May 2015. Performing during the show in position 12, "Unbroken" was not announced among the top 10 entries of the first semi-final and therefore did not qualify to compete in the final. It was later revealed that Iceland placed fifteenth out of the 17 participating countries in the semi-final with 14 points.

== Background ==
Prior to the 2015 contest, Iceland had participated in the Eurovision Song Contest twenty-seven times since its first entry in 1986. Iceland's best placing in the contest to this point was second, which it achieved on two occasions: in 1999 with the song "All Out of Luck" performed by Selma and in 2009 with the song "Is It True?" performed by Yohanna. Since the introduction of semi-finals to the format of the Eurovision Song Contest in 2004, Iceland has, to this point, only failed to qualify to the final three times. In 2014, Iceland managed to qualify to the final and placed fifteenth with the song "No Prejudice" performed by the band Pollapönk.

The Icelandic national broadcaster, Ríkisútvarpið (RÚV), broadcasts the event within Iceland and organises the selection process for the nation's entry. RÚV confirmed their intentions to participate at the 2015 Eurovision Song Contest on 21 May 2014. Since 2006, Iceland has used a national final to select their entry for the Eurovision Song Contest, a method that continued for their 2015 participation.

== Before Eurovision ==
=== Söngvakeppnin 2015 ===
Söngvakeppnin 2015 was the national final format developed by RÚV in order to select Iceland's entry for the Eurovision Song Contest 2015. The three shows in the competition were hosted by Ragnhildur Steinunn Jónsdóttir, Guðrún Dís Emilsdóttir and Salka Sól Eyfeld and all took place at the Háskólabíó venue in Reykjavík. The semi-finals and final were broadcast on RÚV and online at the broadcaster's official website ruv.is. The final was also broadcast via radio on Rás 2 and streamed online at the Eurovision Song Contest official website eurovision.tv.

==== Format ====
Twelve songs in total competed in Söngvakeppnin 2015 where the winner was determined after two semi-finals and a final. Six songs competed in each semi-final on 31 January and 7 February 2015. The top three songs from each semi-final, as determined by public televoting qualified to the final which took place on 14 February 2015. A jury also selected a wildcard act for the final out of the remaining non-qualifying acts from both semi-finals. The winning entry in the final was determined over two rounds of voting: the first to select the top two via 50/50 public televoting and jury voting and the second to determine the winner with 100% televoting. All songs were required to be performed in Icelandic during the semi-final portion of the competition. In the final, the song was required to be performed in the language that the artist intended to perform in at the Eurovision Song Contest in Vienna. In addition to selecting the Icelandic entry for Eurovision, a monetary prize of 1 million Icelandic króna was awarded to the songwriters responsible for the winning entry.

==== Competing entries ====
On 26 September 2014, RÚV opened the submission period for interested songwriters to submit their entries until the deadline on 20 October 2014, which was later extended by one week to 27 October 2014. Songwriters were required to be Icelandic or possess Icelandic citizenship and had the right to submit up to two entries. However, exceptions would be made for minor collaborations with foreign songwriters as long as two-thirds of the composition and half of the lyrics are by Icelandic composers/lyricists. RÚV initially included a new rule specifying that half of the selected entries were required to be composed by females, however the rule was later revoked following criticism from previous Icelandic Eurovision entrants Páll Óskar (1998) and Friðrik Ómar (2008). At the close of the submission deadline, 258 entries were received. A selection committee was formed in order to select the top twelve entries. The twelve competing artists and songs were revealed by the broadcaster during a press conference on 8 January 2015. Among the competing artists was previous Icelandic Eurovision entrant Regína Ósk, who represented Iceland in 2008 as part of Euroband. RÚV presented the songs on 23 January 2015 during the Rás 1 radio programme Morgunútgafan. Both entries that later qualified to the second round of the final entered English versions of their songs for the competition.

Artist	Song		Songwriter(s)
Artist	Icelandic title	English title	Songwriter(s)
Bjarni Lárus Hall	"Brotið gler"	—N/a	Axel Árnason, Bjarni Lárus Hall
Björn og félagar	"Piltur og stúlka"	—N/a	Björn Þór Sigbjörnsson, Tómas Hermannsson, Björn Jörundur Friðbjörnsson
Cadem	"Fyrir alla"	"Fly"	Daníel Óliver Sveinsson, Jimmy Åkerfors, Einar Ágúst Víðisson
Elín Sif Halldórsdóttir	"Í kvöld"	"Dance Slow"	Elín Sif Halldórsdóttir
Erna Hrönn Ólafsdóttir	"Myrkrið hljótt"	—N/a	Arnar Ástráðsson, Erna Hrönn Ólafsdóttir
Friðrik Dór	"Í síðasta skipti"	"Once Again"	Pálmi Ragnar Ásgeirsson, Ásgeir Orri Ásgeirsson, Sæþór Kristjánsson, Friðrik Dór Jónsson
Haukur Heiðar Hauksson	"Milljón augnablik"	—N/a	Karl Olgeir Olgeirsson, Haukur Heiðar Hauksson
Hinemoa	"Þú leitar líka að mér"	—N/a	Ásta Björg Björgvinsdóttir, Bergrún Íris Sævarsdóttir
María Ólafsdóttir	"Lítil skref"	"Unbroken"	Ásgeir Orri Ásgeirsson, Pálmi Ragnar Ásgeirsson, Sæþór Kristjánsson
Regína Ósk	"Aldrei of seint"	—N/a	María Björk Sverrisdóttir, Marcus Frenell, Sarah Reede, Regína Ósk Óskarsdóttir
Stefanía Svavarsdóttir	"Augnablik"	—N/a	Sveinn Rúnar Sigurðsson
Sunday	"Fjaðrir"	"Feathers"	Hildur Kristín Stefánsdóttir, Guðfinnur Sveinsson

==== Semi-finals ====
The two semi-finals took place on 31 January and 7 February 2015. In each semi-final six acts presented their entries, and the top three entries voted upon solely by public televoting proceeded to the final. "Milljón augnablik" performed by Haukur Heiðar Hauksson was awarded the jury wildcard and also proceeded to the final.

The shows also featured guest performances by MC Blævi and host Salka Sól in the first semi-final, and 1986 Icelandic Eurovision entrant Helga Möller, 1993 Icelandic Eurovision entrant Ingibjörg Stefánsdóttir, 1992 Icelandic Eurovision entrant Sigrún Eva Ármannsdóttir, 1992 and 1994 Icelandic Eurovision entrant Sigga and 2003 Icelandic Eurovision entrant Birgitta Haukdal in the second semi-final. The guests in the second semi-final performed a medley of past Eurovision entries.

Semi-final 1 – 31 January 2015
R/O	Artist	Song	Televote	Place	Result
1	Erna Hrönn Ólafsdóttir	"Myrkrið hljótt"	2,958	4	—N/a
2	Hinemoa	"Þú leitar líka að mér"	2,738	5	—N/a
3	Elín Sif Halldórsdóttir	"Í kvöld"	6,857	2	Advanced
4	Friðrik Dór	"Í síðasta skipti"	6,970	1	Advanced
5	Stefanía Svavarsdóttir	"Augnablik"	2,427	6	—N/a
6	Björn og félagar	"Piltur og stúlka"	6,616	3	Advanced

Semi-final 2 – 7 February 2015
R/O	Artist	Song	Televote	Place	Result
1	Haukur Heiðar Hauksson	"Milljón augnablik"	2,899	4	Wildcard
2	María Ólafsdóttir	"Lítil skref"	6,428	1	Advanced
3	Sunday	"Fjaðrir"	3,185	3	Advanced
4	Regína Ósk	"Aldrei of seint"	2,190	6	—N/a
5	Bjarni Lárus Hall	"Brotið gler"	2,351	5	—N/a
6	Cadem	"Fyrir alla"	4,953	2	Advanced

==== Final ====
The final took place on 14 February 2015 where the seven entries that qualified from the preceding two semi-finals competed. In the semi-finals, all competing entries were required to be performed in Icelandic; however, entries competing in the final were required to be presented in the language they would compete with in the Eurovision Song Contest. Two entries remained in Icelandic ("Piltur og stúlka" performed by Björn og félagar and "Milljón augnablik" performed by Haukur Heiðar Hauksson), while the other five entries competed in English. In the first round of voting, votes from a five-member jury panel (50%) and public televoting (50%) determined the top two entries. The top two entries advanced to a second round of voting, the superfinal, where the winner, "Unbroken" performed by María Ólafsdóttir, was determined by aggregating the televotes from the first round to the televotes of the second.

The jury panel that voted in the first round consisted of:

- Einar Bárðarson – radio host, music manager
- Jóhanna Guðrún Jónsdóttir – singer-songwriter, 2009 Icelandic Eurovision entrant
- Sigríður Thorlacius – singer, composer, member of the band Hjaltalín
- Stefán Hilmarsson – singer, composer, member of the band Sálin; 1988 and 1991 Icelandic Eurovision entrant
- Valdimar Guðmundsson – singer, member of the band Valdimar

In addition to the performances of the competing artists, the show was opened by 2014 Icelandic Eurovision entrant Pollapönk, while the interval acts featured guest performances by Magni Ásgeirsson, Jógvan Hansen, Páll Rósinkranz, 2008 Icelandic Eurovision entrant Friðrik Ómar and Bjarni Arason.

Final – 14 February 2015
R/O	Artist	Song	Jury	Televote		Total	Place
R/O	Artist	Song	Jury	Votes	Points	Total	Place
1	Cadem	"Fly"	4	6,491	5	9	6
2	Sunday	"Feathers"	6	8,539	7	13	5
3	Björn og félagar	"Piltur og stúlka"	10	8,444	6	16	4
4	María Ólafsdóttir	"Unbroken"	7	21,437	10	17	2
5	Elín Sif Halldórsdóttir	"Dance Slow"	8	14,409	8	16	3
6	Friðrik Dór	"Once Again"	12	21,834	12	24	1
7	Haukur Heiðar Hauksson	"Milljón augnablik"	5	4,239	4	9	7

Superfinal – 14 February 2015
R/O	Artist	Song	Televote			Place
R/O	Artist	Song	First Round	Second Round	Total	Place
1	María Ólafsdóttir	"Unbroken"	21,437	49,337	70,774	1
2	Friðrik Dór	"Once Again"	21,834	34,016	55,850	2

=== Preparation ===
The official music video for "Unbroken" was released on 13 March 2015. The video, directed and produced by IRIS Films and choreographed by Stella Rósenkranz, was filmed at the Korpúlfsstaðir farm in Reykjavík and at an old cement factory in Akranes.

=== Promotion ===
María Ólafs specifically promoted "Unbroken" as the Icelandic Eurovision entry on 24 April 2015 by performing during the Eurovision Pre-Party, which was held at the Place de Paris Korston Concert Hall in Moscow, Russia.

== At Eurovision ==
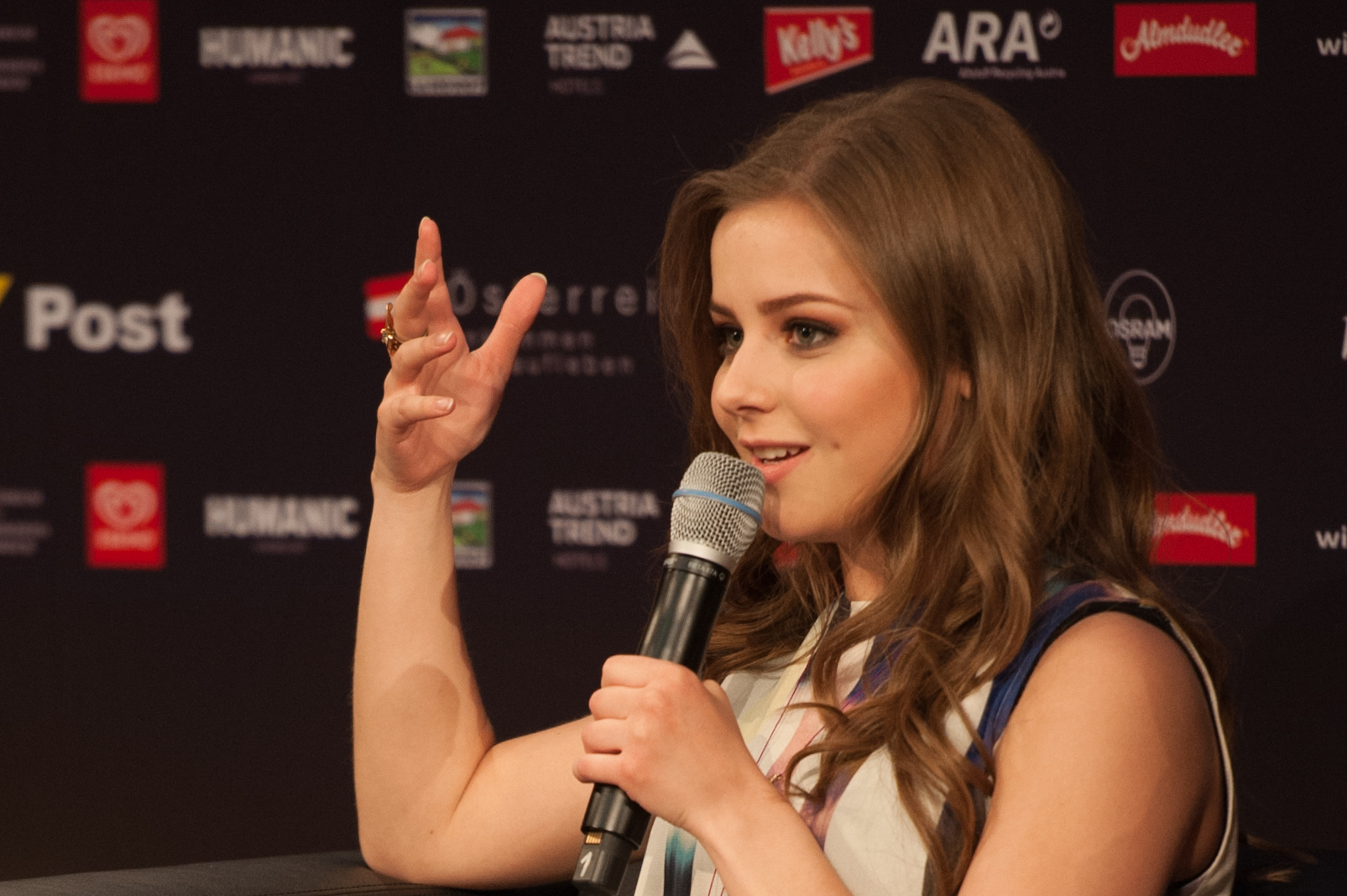
María Ólafs during a press meet and greet

According to Eurovision rules, all nations with the exceptions of the host country and the "Big Five" (France, Germany, Italy, Spain and the United Kingdom) are required to qualify from one of two semi-finals in order to compete for the final; the top ten countries from each semi-final progress to the final. In the 2015 contest, Australia also competed directly in the final as an invited guest nation. The European Broadcasting Union (EBU) split up the competing countries into five different pots based on voting patterns from previous contests, with countries with favourable voting histories put into the same pot. On 26 January 2015, a special allocation draw was held which placed each country into one of the two semi-finals, as well as which half of the show they would perform in. Iceland was placed into the second semi-final, to be held on 21 May 2015, and was scheduled to perform in the second half of the show.

Once all the competing songs for the 2015 contest had been released, the running order for the semi-finals was decided by the shows' producers rather than through another draw, so that similar songs were not placed next to each other. Iceland was set to perform in position 12, following the entry from Azerbaijan and before the entry from Sweden.

The two semi-finals and the final were broadcast in Iceland on RÚV and Rás 2 with commentary by Felix Bergsson. The Icelandic spokesperson, who announced the Icelandic votes during the final, was Sigríður Halldórsdóttir.

=== Semi-final ===
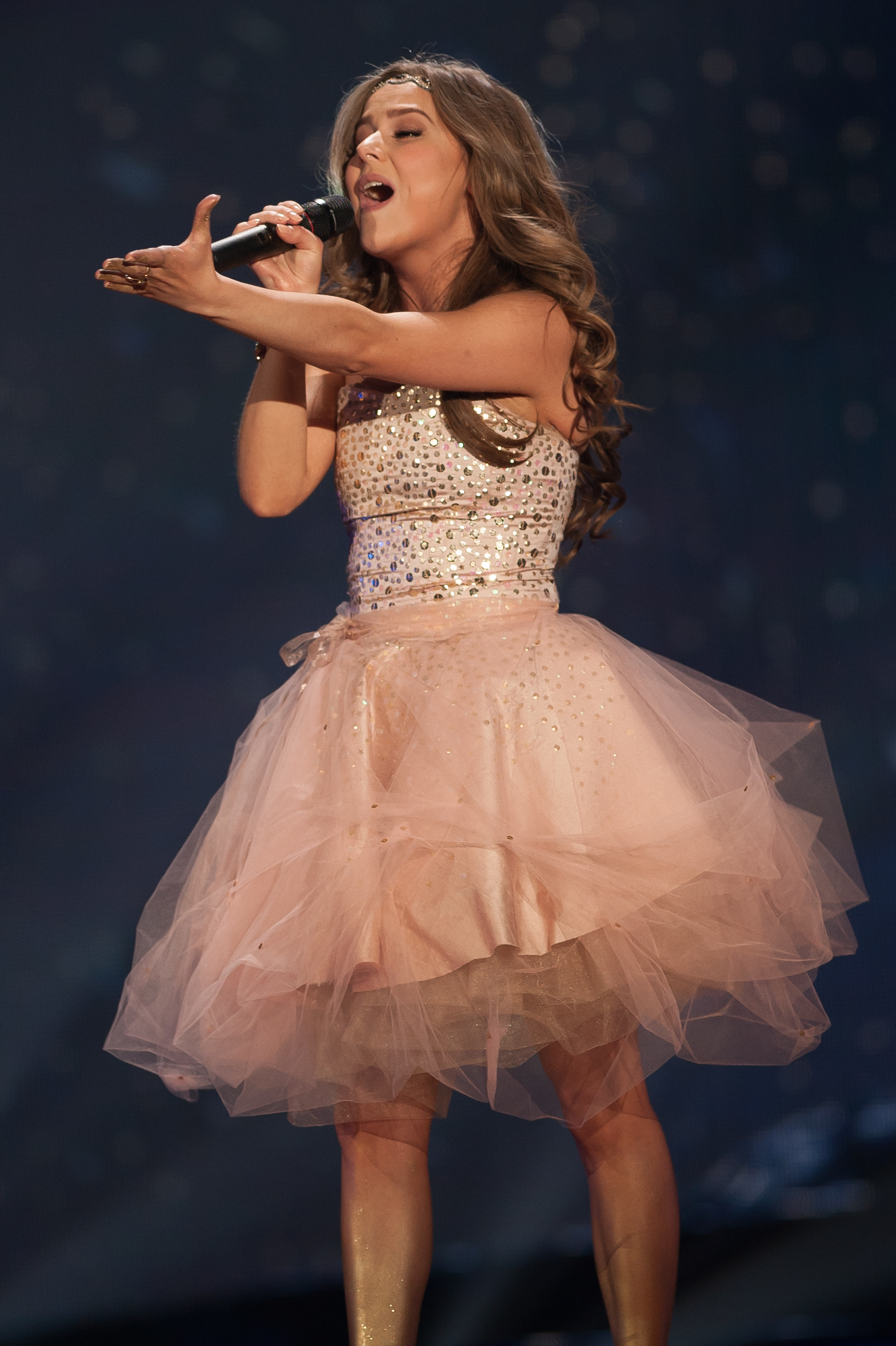
María Ólafs during a rehearsal before the second semi-final

María Ólafs took part in technical rehearsals on 14 and 16 May, followed by dress rehearsals on 20 and 21 May. This included the jury show on 9 May where the professional juries of each country watched and voted on the competing entries.

The Icelandic performance featured María Ólafs in a champagne-rose tutu dress with golden particles on its upper part designed by designer Sunna Dögg Ásgeirsdóttir, joined on stage by five backing vocalists dressed in dark blue and black outfits. The LED screens displayed scenic images of the Northern lights and shooting stars. In regards to the performance, Jonatan Gardarsson, the head of the Icelandic delegation, stated: "The stage performance is based on what Maria is singing about followed by Nordic lights in the background. As you have already seen she has golden feet and the floor will turn gold at some point. It will look like a sun rising after those dark moments." The performance was choreographed by 1999 and 2005 Icelandic Eurovision entrant Selma Björnsdóttir. The backing vocalists that joined María Ólafs were: Friðrik Dór, the co-composer of "Unbroken" Ásgeir Orri Ásgeirsson, Alma Rut Kristinsdóttir, Íris Hólm Jónsdóttir and Hera Björk Þórhallsdóttir. Hera Björk Þórhallsdóttir previously represented Iceland in 2010.

At the end of the show, Iceland was not announced among the top 10 entries in the second semi-final and therefore failed to qualify to compete in the final. It was later revealed that Iceland placed fifteenth in the semi-final, receiving a total of 14 points.

=== Voting ===
Voting during the three shows consisted of 50 percent public televoting and 50 percent from a jury deliberation. The jury consisted of five music industry professionals who were citizens of the country they represent, with their names published before the contest to ensure transparency. This jury was asked to judge each contestant based on: vocal capacity; the stage performance; the song's composition and originality; and the overall impression by the act. In addition, no member of a national jury could be related in any way to any of the competing acts in such a way that they cannot vote impartially and independently. The individual rankings of each jury member were released shortly after the grand final.

Following the release of the full split voting by the EBU after the conclusion of the competition, it was revealed that Iceland had placed fourteenth with the public televote and fifteenth with the jury vote in the second semi-final. In the public vote, Iceland scored 21 points, while with the jury vote, Iceland scored 15 points.

Below is a breakdown of points awarded to Iceland and awarded by Iceland in the second semi-final and grand final of the contest, and the breakdown of the jury voting and televoting conducted during the two shows:

==== Points awarded to Iceland ====
Points awarded to Iceland (Semi-final 2)
Score	Country
12 points	
10 points	
8 points	
7 points	
6 points	
5 points	Azerbaijan
4 points	
3 points	
2 points	Ireland; Norway; Poland; Sweden
1 point	Lithuania

==== Points awarded by Iceland ====
Points awarded by Iceland (Semi-final 2)
Score	Country
12 points	Sweden
10 points	Norway
8 points	Israel
7 points	Latvia
6 points	Slovenia
5 points	Cyprus
4 points	Lithuania
3 points	Poland
2 points	Azerbaijan
1 point	Switzerland

Points awarded by Iceland (Final)
Score	Country
12 points	Sweden
10 points	Norway
8 points	Australia
7 points	Latvia
6 points	Italy
5 points	Israel
4 points	Belgium
3 points	Russia
2 points	Slovenia
1 point	Estonia

==== Detailed voting results ====
The following members comprised the Icelandic jury:

- Védís Hervör (jury chairperson) – singer, songwriter
- Einar Bárðarson – managing director at Reykjavik City
- Unnur Sara – singer
- Birgitta Haukdal – singer, vocal coach, represented Iceland in the 2003 contest
- Heiðar Örn – musician, teacher, represented Iceland in the 2014 contest as member of Pollapönk

Detailed voting results from Iceland (Semi-final 2)
R/O	Country	V. Hervör	E. Bárðarson	U. Sara	B. Haukdal	H. Örn	Jury Rank	Televote Rank	Combined Rank	Points
01	Lithuania	4	15	2	14	4	7	8	7	4
02	Ireland	3	14	11	12	5	9	16	14	
03	San Marino	16	16	12	16	16	16	15	16	
04	Montenegro	15	13	5	13	15	14	10	13	
05	Malta	8	11	14	6	11	11	12	12	
06	Norway	1	5	7	5	1	2	2	2	10
07	Portugal	5	10	15	10	12	12	14	15	
08	Czech Republic	13	12	10	9	13	13	9	11	
09	Israel	10	4	3	2	8	4	3	3	8
10	Latvia	6	2	8	7	3	3	5	4	7
11	Azerbaijan	12	7	9	3	6	6	13	9	2
12	Iceland									
13	Sweden	2	1	4	1	2	1	1	1	12
14	Switzerland	9	8	16	8	7	10	11	10	1
15	Cyprus	11	3	6	11	9	8	7	6	5
16	Slovenia	7	6	1	4	10	5	6	5	6
17	Poland	14	9	13	15	14	15	4	8	3

Detailed voting results from Iceland (Final)
R/O	Country	V. Hervör	E. Bárðarson	U. Sara	B. Haukdal	H. Örn	Jury Rank	Televote Rank	Combined Rank	Points
01	Slovenia	5	10	2	6	10	5	11	9	2
02	France	15	23	24	16	13	19	25	24	
03	Israel	9	8	8	5	7	6	6	6	5
04	Estonia	14	16	10	21	5	12	7	10	1
05	United Kingdom	24	18	14	27	26	25	15	21	
06	Armenia	27	27	23	26	24	26	26	27	
07	Lithuania	7	19	19	15	21	16	12	13	
08	Serbia	23	13	22	24	18	23	16	20	
09	Norway	1	6	6	1	2	2	4	2	10
10	Sweden	4	1	3	3	1	1	2	1	12
11	Cyprus	19	9	11	18	16	14	13	11	
12	Australia	10	5	1	4	8	4	3	3	8
13	Belgium	3	4	7	17	12	8	5	7	4
14	Austria	6	14	13	13	6	9	21	15	
15	Greece	20	20	26	11	22	21	27	25	
16	Montenegro	18	26	16	12	15	18	23	22	
17	Germany	22	12	20	14	11	15	22	19	
18	Poland	21	17	21	23	17	22	10	16	
19	Latvia	2	2	4	9	3	3	8	4	7
20	Romania	17	25	18	22	23	24	20	23	
21	Spain	8	15	25	10	14	13	14	12	
22	Hungary	16	21	17	19	25	20	17	18	
23	Georgia	13	22	12	20	19	17	19	17	
24	Azerbaijan	12	11	15	7	9	10	18	14	
25	Russia	11	7	9	8	4	7	9	8	3
26	Albania	26	24	27	25	27	27	24	26	
27	Italy	25	3	5	2	20	11	1	5	6
