= Switzerland in the Eurovision Song Contest 2015 =

- Eurovision Song Contest 2015
- Participating broadcaster: Swiss Broadcasting Corporation (SRG SSR)
- Country: Switzerland
- Selection process: ESC 2015 – die Entscheidungsshow
- Selection date: 31 January 2015

Competing entry
- Song: "Time to Shine"
- Artist: Mélanie René
- Songwriters: Mélanie René

Placement
- Semi-final result: Failed to qualify (17th)

Participation chronology

Switzerland was represented at the Eurovision Song Contest 2015 with the song "Time to Shine" written and performed by Mélanie René. The Swiss entry for the 2015 contest in Vienna, Austria was selected through the national final ESC 2015 – die Entscheidungsshow, organised by the Swiss German speaking broadcaster Schweizer Radio und Fernsehen (SRF) in collaboration with the other broadcasters part of the Swiss Broadcasting Corporation (SRG SSR). Artists that were interested in entering the Swiss national final had the opportunity to apply to one of three open selections with defined submission periods organised by SRF together with the Swiss-Romansh broadcaster Radiotelevisiun Svizra Rumantscha (RTR), the Swiss-French broadcaster Radio Télévision Suisse (RTS) and/or the Swiss-Italian broadcaster Radiotelevisione svizzera (RSI). A total of 18 entries were selected to advance to an "Expert Check" round; nine entries were selected from the SRF/RTR selection, six entries were selected from the RTS selection and three entries were selected from the RSI selection. The "Expert Check" was held on 7 December 2014 at SRF Studio 5 in Zürich and involved five experts evaluating the live performances of the 18 entries and selecting six entries to advance to the televised national final—three artists and songs from the SRF/RTR candidates, two from the RTS candidates and one from the RSI candidates. The six finalists performed during the national final on 31 January 2015 where a combination of jury voting and public voting ultimately selected "Time to Shine" performed by Mélanie René as the winner.

Switzerland was drawn to compete in the second semi-final of the Eurovision Song Contest which took place on 21 May 2015. Performing during the show in position 14, "Time to Shine" was not announced among the top 10 entries of the second semi-final and therefore did not qualify to compete in the final. It was later revealed that Switzerland placed seventeenth (last) out of the 17 participating countries in the semi-final with 4 points.

== Background ==
Prior to the 2015 contest, Switzerland had participated in the Eurovision Song Contest fifty-five times since its first entry in 1956. Switzerland is noted for having won the first edition of the Eurovision Song Contest with the song "Refrain" performed by Lys Assia. Their second and, to this point, most recent victory was achieved in 1988 when Canadian singer Céline Dion won the contest with the song "Ne partez pas sans moi". Following the introduction of semi-finals for the 2004, Switzerland had managed to participate in the final four times up to this point. In 2005, the internal selection of Estonian girl band Vanilla Ninja, performing the song "Cool Vibes", qualified Switzerland to the final where they placed 8th. Due to their successful result in 2005, Switzerland was pre-qualified to compete directly in the final in 2006. Between 2007 and 2010, the nation failed to qualify to the final after a string of internal selections. Since opting to organize a national final from 2011 onwards, Switzerland has managed to qualify to the final twice out of the last four years. In 2014, Switzerland earned their highest result in the contest since 2005, qualifying to the final and placing 13th with the song "Hunter of Stars" performed by Sebalter.

The Swiss national broadcaster, Swiss Broadcasting Corporation (SRG SSR), broadcasts the event within Switzerland and organises the selection process for the nation's entry. SRG SSR confirmed their intentions to participate at the 2015 Eurovision Song Contest on 18 July 2014. Along with their participation confirmation, the broadcaster also announced that the Swiss entry for the 2015 contest would be selected through a national final. Switzerland has selected their entry for the Eurovision Song Contest through both national finals and internal selections in the past. Between 2005 and 2010, the Swiss entry was internally selected for the competition. Since 2011, the broadcaster has opted to organize a national final in order to select their entry.

== Before Eurovision ==
=== ESC 2015 – die Entscheidungsshow ===
ESC 2015 – die Entscheidungsshow was the fifth edition of the Swiss national final format that selected Switzerland's entry for the Eurovision Song Contest 2015. The national final was a collaboration between four broadcasters in Switzerland: the Swiss-German broadcaster Schweizer Radio und Fernsehen (SRF), the Swiss-French broadcaster Radio Télévision Suisse (RTS), the Swiss-Italian broadcaster Radiotelevisione svizzera (RSI) and the Swiss-Romansh broadcaster Radiotelevisiun Svizra Rumantscha (RTR). The show took place on 31 January 2015 at the Bodensee Arena in Kreuzlingen, hosted by Sven Epiney and was televised on SRF 1, RSI La 2 with Italian commentary by Clarissa Tami and Paolo Meneguzzi, and RTS Deux with French commentary by Nicolas Tanner and Jean-Marc Richard. The competition was also streamed online at the respective official website of each Swiss broadcaster as well as at the official Eurovision Song Contest website eurovision.tv.

==== Selection process ====
The selection process took place in three stages before the finalists for the live show and ultimately the winner are selected. The first stage of the competition included SRF/RTR, RTS and RSI each conducting varying selections in order to determine the candidates they submitted for the second stage of the competition. SRF/RTR submitted nine candidates, RTS submitted six candidates and RSI submitted three candidates. The second stage was the Expert Check live audition, where the 18 selected candidates performed the songs that qualified from their respective broadcaster selections. A jury panel selected three artists and songs to qualify from the SRF/RTR selection, two from the RTS selection and one from the RSI selection. The six artists and songs proceed to the third stage, the televised national final, where the winning artist and song was selected to represent Switzerland in Vienna.

- The SRF/RTR selection involved an online internet voting platform where interested artists could submit their songs and have them listed for public listening. The platform accepted entries between 29 September 2014 and 27 October 2014. 210 entries were submitted following the submission deadline, including an entry from 1999 French entrant Nayah. Internet users had between 3 and 17 December 2014 to vote for their favourite entries and their votes were combined with the votes from an expert jury. On 25 November 2014, the top nine entries for the "Expert Check" were announced.
- The RTS selection involved interested artists submitting their entries to the broadcaster between 9 September 2014 and 27 October 2014. At the close of the deadline, 26 entries were received. Ten of the entries were selected to perform live during a radio show on 23 November 2014 from the RTS Studio 15 in Lausanne, and a jury panel that consisted of Catherine Colombara, Laurent Pavia, Emile Felber and Nicolas Tanner selected the six candidates that proceeded to the "Expert Check".
- RSI opened a submission period between 16 July 2014 and 15 October 2014 for interested artists and composers to submit their entries. On 4 November 2014, a jury panel consisting of 2008 Swiss contest entrant Paolo Meneguzzi, Iris Moné and Simone Tomassini evaluated the 28 entry submissions received and selected the three candidates that proceeded to the "Expert Check".

===== Expert Check =====
The "Expert Check" of the eighteen selected candidates was webcast from SRF Studio 5 in Zürich on 7 December 2014 and was hosted by Clarissa Tami. The candidates performed their songs in front of an expert panel which assessed the performers on criteria such as live performance skills, voice quality and stage presence. The expert panel consisted of choreographer Rafael Antonio (representative of SRF), vocal coach Freda Goodlet (representative of SRF), the director of strategic marketing at Universal Music Switzerland Moritz Faccin (representative of SRF), the director of Option Musique Catherine Colombara (representative of RTS) and musician Nicola Locarnini (representative of RSI). Three artists and songs qualified from the SRF/RTR selection, two from the RTS selection and one from the RSI selection.

Expert Check – 7 December 2014
Channel	R/O	Artist	Song	Songwriter(s)	Result
SRF/RTR	1	Bubble Beatz feat. Sandra Wild	"Run"	Christian Gschwend, Kay Rauber, Leander Bauer	—N/a
SRF/RTR	2	Simon Hafner	"There Was a Yesterday"	Simon Hafner	—N/a
SRF/RTR	3	San Dii	"iMagination"	Boris Tadić	—N/a
RTS	4	Anach Cuan	"Hurdy Gurdy Girls"	Anach Cuan	—N/a
RTS	5	Célia	"Letter to Myself"	Célia Droz, Lise Cabble, Boe Larsen	—N/a
RTS	6	Alenko	"Vu d'en haut"	Alexandre Coppaloni, Christophe Calpini	—N/a
RTS	7	Licia Chery	"Fly"	Léticia Andris	Advanced
RTS	8	Mélanie René	"Time to Shine"	Mélanie René	Advanced
RTS	9	Shana Pearson	"Kevlar Heart"	Charlie Mason	—N/a
RSI	10	The Vad Vuc	"Cocktail e fantasmi"	Daniele Cuffaro, Fabio Martino, Michele Carobbio	—N/a
RSI	11	Elias feat. Zero In On	"Your Perfume"	Elias Bertini, Mattia Stefanini, Camila Koller	—N/a
RSI	12	Deborah Bough	"Take Me Back to 23"	Deborah Bough	Advanced
SRF/RTR	13	Arbresha	"Same Stars"	Arbresha Latifaj	—N/a
SRF/RTR	14	Dahï	"Destiny"	Viktor Koston, Diana Speranza	—N/a
SRF/RTR	15	Timebelle	"Singing About Love"	Mihai Alexandru, Andrada Ioana	Advanced
SRF/RTR	16	Andy McSean	"Hey Now"	Andy Stadelmann	Advanced
SRF/RTR	17	Tiziana	"Only Human"	Jesse Singer, Nick Banns, Chris Soper, Will Knox, Shayna Zaid	Advanced
SRF/RTR	18	Thierry Condor	"Open Heart Surgery"	Urs Wiesendanger	—N/a

==== Final ====
The final took place on 31 January 2015. The show consisted of two parts: in the first part the six candidate songs in contention to represent Switzerland were performed and in the second part each artist performed a cover version of a song of their choice. The combination of televoting (50%) and the votes of an expert jury (50%) selected "Time to Shine" performed by Mélanie René as the winner. The jury consisted of Peter Ramón Baumann (Vice President of OGAE Switzerland), Lilly Behling (music editor for Die grössten Schweizer Talente), Dano Tamasy (music editor Radio SRF 3), Mark B. Lay (vocal coach), Grazia Covre (choreographer), Valérie Ogier (journalist/columnist), Nic Maeder (lead singer for Swiss band Gotthard), Sebalter (singer, Swiss Eurovision contestant in 2014), Simone Tomassini (singer) and Alice Bertogg (RTR television host; singer). In addition to the performances from the competing artists, Austrian Eurovision Song Contest 2014 winner Conchita Wurst performed "Rise Like a Phoenix" as the interval act.

Final – 31 January 2015
R/O	Artist	Song	R/O	Song (Original artists)	Place
1	Deborah Bough	"Take Me Back to 23"	7	"Shake It Off" (Taylor Swift)	6
2	Timebelle	"Singing About Love"	8	"Rude Boy" (Rihanna)	2
3	Licia Chery	"Fly"	9	"All About That Bass" (Meghan Trainor)	3
4	Andy McSean	"Hey Now"	10	"Chasing Cars" (Snow Patrol)	4
5	Mélanie René	"Time to Shine"	11	"Chandelier" (Sia)	1
6	Tiziana	"Only Human"	12	"The Power of Love" (Frankie Goes to Hollywood)	5

=== Promotion ===
Mélanie René made several appearances across Europe to specifically promote "Time to Shine" as the Swiss Eurovision entry. On 17 April, René performed during the Eurovision PreParty Riga, which was organised by OGAE Latvia and held at the Palladium Concert Hall in Riga on 17 April. On 26 April, René performed during the London Eurovision Party, which was held at the Café de Paris venue in London, United Kingdom and hosted by Nicki French and Paddy O'Connell.

== At Eurovision ==
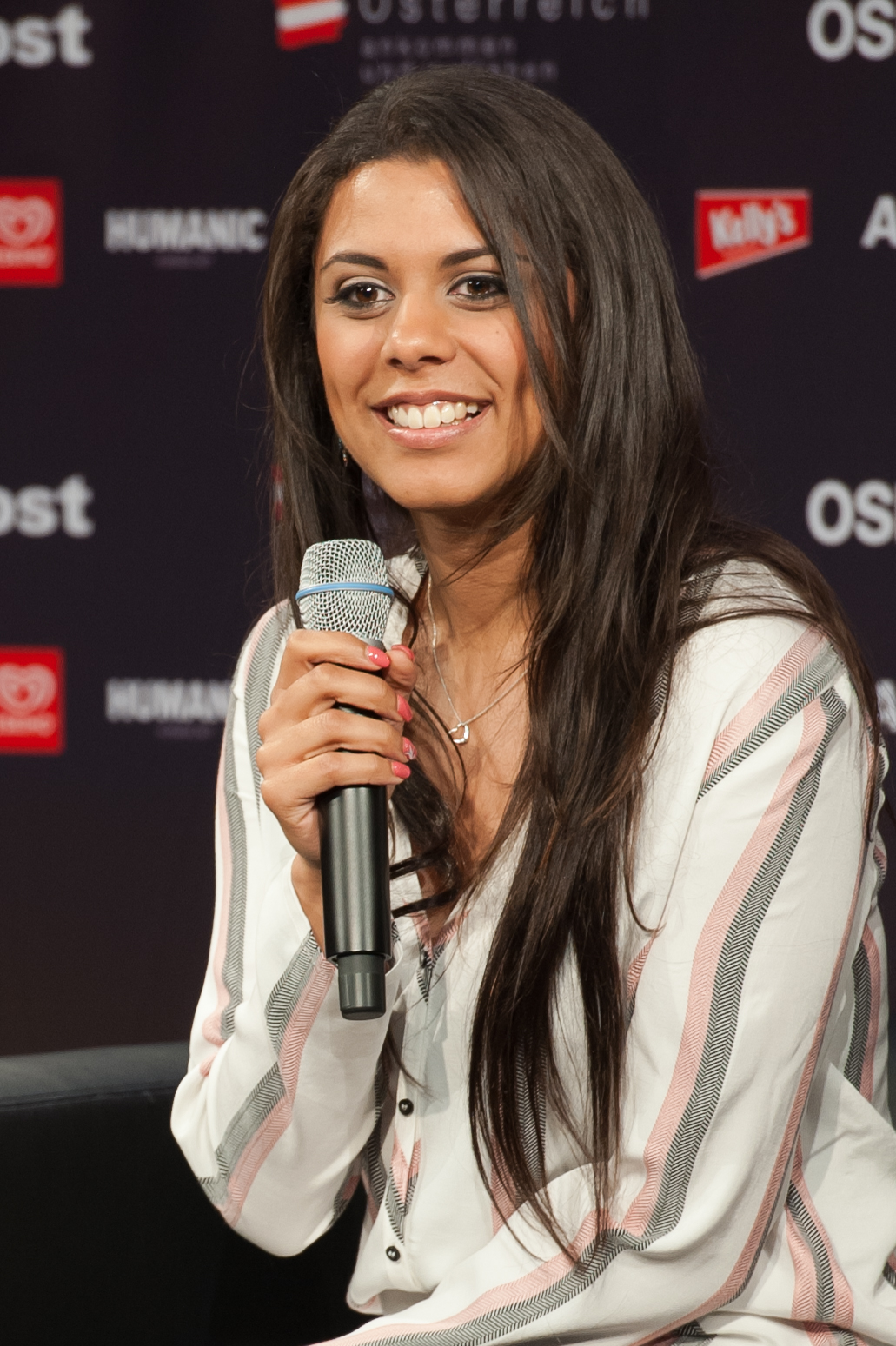
Mélanie René during a press meet and greet

According to Eurovision rules, all nations with the exceptions of the host country and the "Big Five" (France, Germany, Italy, Spain and the United Kingdom) are required to qualify from one of two semi-finals in order to compete for the final; the top ten countries from each semi-final progress to the final. In the 2015 contest, Australia also competed directly in the final as an invited guest nation. The European Broadcasting Union (EBU) split up the competing countries into five different pots based on voting patterns from previous contests, with countries with favourable voting histories put into the same pot. On 26 January 2015, a special allocation draw was held which placed each country into one of the two semi-finals, as well as which half of the show they would perform in. Switzerland was placed into the second semi-final, to be held on 21 May 2015, and was scheduled to perform in the second half of the show.

Once all the competing songs for the 2015 contest had been released, the running order for the semi-finals was decided by the shows' producers rather than through another draw, so that similar songs were not placed next to each other. Switzerland was set to perform in position 14, following the entry from Sweden and before the entry from Cyprus.

In Switzerland, three broadcasters that form SRG SSR aired the contest. Sven Epiney provided German commentary for both semi-finals airing on SRF zwei and the final airing on SRF 1. German commentary was also provided by Peter Schneider and Gabriel Vetter for the final on Radio SRF 3 and via dual channel audio on SRF 1. Jean-Marc Richard and Nicolas Tanner provided French commentary for the second semi-final on RTS Deux and the final on RTS Un. Clarissa Tami and 2008 Swiss Eurovision Song Contest entrant Paolo Meneguzzi provided Italian commentary for the second semi-final on RSI La 2 and the final on RSI La 1. The Swiss spokesperson, who announced the Swiss votes during the final, was Laetitia Guarino.

=== Semi-final ===
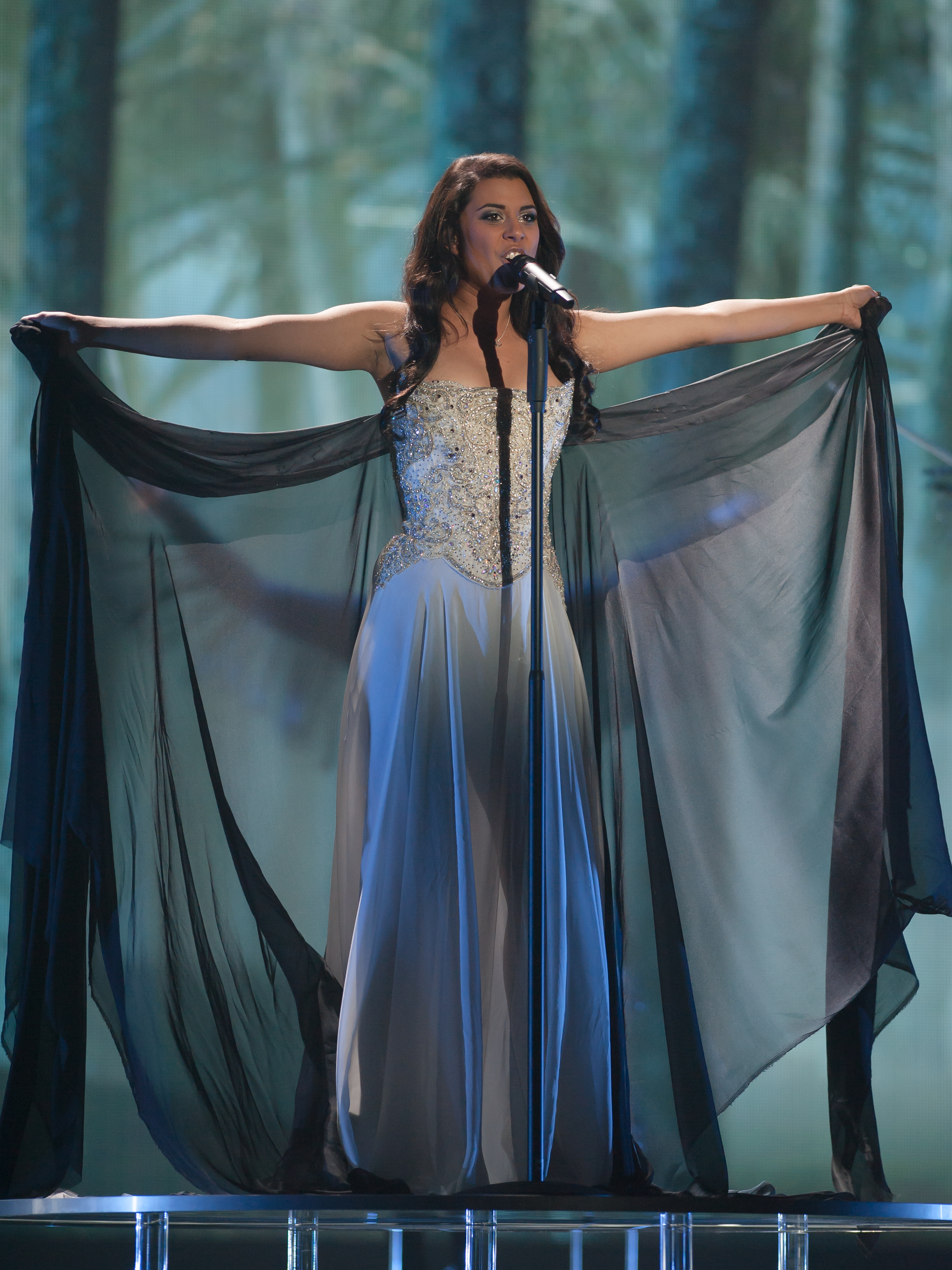
Mélanie René during a rehearsal before the second semi-final

Mélanie René took part in technical rehearsals on 14 and 16 May, followed by dress rehearsals on 20 and 21 May. This included the jury final where professional juries of each country, responsible for 50 percent of each country's vote, watched and voted on the competing entries.

The Swiss performance featured Mélanie René in a long ivory dress with a transparent black cape and standing on a pedestal at the centre of the stage. René was flanked by four backing vocalists who wore black costumes with fringes and played large drums. The LED screens displayed forest scenery. The performance also featured the use of a wind machine, CO_{2} jets blowing from the ground and "falling star" pyrotechnics. The backing vocalists that joined Mélanie René were: Anissa Condemi Montemouhin, Idyl Nahla, Flavie Crisinel Cheuwa and Natacha Karine Montille.

At the end of the show, Switzerland failed to qualify to the final and was not announced among the top ten nations. It was later revealed that Switzerland placed seventeenth (last) in the semi-final, receiving a total of 4 points.

=== Voting ===
Voting during the three shows consisted of 50 percent public televoting and 50 percent from a jury deliberation. The jury consisted of five music industry professionals who were citizens of the country they represent, with their names published before the contest to ensure transparency. This jury was asked to judge each contestant based on: vocal capacity; the stage performance; the song's composition and originality; and the overall impression by the act. In addition, no member of a national jury could be related in any way to any of the competing acts in such a way that they cannot vote impartially and independently. The individual rankings of each jury member were released shortly after the grand final.

Following the release of the full split voting by the EBU after the conclusion of the competition, it was revealed that Switzerland had placed seventeenth (last) with the public televote and fourteenth with the jury vote in the second semi-final. In the public vote, Switzerland scored 6 points, while with the jury vote, Switzerland scored 15 points.

Below is a breakdown of points awarded to Switzerland and awarded by Switzerland in the second semi-final and grand final of the contest, and the breakdown of the jury voting and televoting conducted during the two shows:

==== Points awarded to Switzerland ====
Points awarded to Switzerland (Semi-final 2)
Score	Country
12 points	
10 points	
8 points	
7 points	
6 points	
5 points	
4 points	
3 points	
2 points	
1 point	Azerbaijan; Iceland; Norway; Poland

==== Points awarded by Switzerland ====
Points awarded by Switzerland (Semi-final 2)
Score	Country
12 points	Sweden
10 points	Norway
8 points	Latvia
7 points	Israel
6 points	Portugal
5 points	Cyprus
4 points	Slovenia
3 points	Lithuania
2 points	Poland
1 point	Montenegro

Points awarded by Switzerland (Final)
Score	Country
12 points	Sweden
10 points	Norway
8 points	Australia
7 points	Russia
6 points	Italy
5 points	Serbia
4 points	Latvia
3 points	Israel
2 points	Belgium
1 point	Spain

==== Detailed voting results ====
The following members comprised the Swiss jury:

- Georg Schlunegger (jury chairperson) – producer and co-owner of Hitmill Productions, writer of the 2013 Swiss entry
- Simu Moser – radio journalist and presenter of the morning show
- Andrea Pärli – Marketing Director International Labels Musikvertrieb
- Gabriel Broggini – singer, represented Switzerland in the 2012 contest as member of Sinplus
- Rafaela Spitzli – Promotion Manager Universal Music Switzerland

Detailed voting results from Switzerland (Semi-final 2)
R/O	Country	G. Schlunegger	S. Moser	A. Pärli	G. Broggini	R. Spitzli	Jury Rank	Televote Rank	Combined Rank	Points
01	Lithuania	12	1	9	5	3	5	12	8	3
02	Ireland	4	7	12	7	8	6	14	13	
03	San Marino	16	16	13	16	16	16	15	16	
04	Montenegro	9	13	14	11	11	15	5	10	1
05	Malta	5	10	4	2	5	4	16	14	
06	Norway	2	6	2	1	4	2	3	2	10
07	Portugal	13	14	15	10	6	14	1	5	6
08	Czech Republic	11	15	6	13	9	12	8	11	
09	Israel	6	2	16	6	12	9	4	4	7
10	Latvia	1	4	5	4	1	1	10	3	8
11	Azerbaijan	10	9	7	12	15	11	11	15	
12	Iceland	15	8	8	3	7	7	13	12	
13	Sweden	8	3	3	9	2	3	2	1	12
14	Switzerland									
15	Cyprus	3	12	10	14	13	10	7	6	5
16	Slovenia	7	11	1	8	14	8	9	7	4
17	Poland	14	5	11	15	10	13	6	9	2

Detailed voting results from Switzerland (Final)
R/O	Country	G. Schlunegger	S. Moser	A. Pärli	G. Broggini	R. Spitzli	Jury Rank	Televote Rank	Combined Rank	Points
01	Slovenia	10	17	5	5	21	11	22	18	
02	France	11	9	13	12	12	9	21	15	
03	Israel	9	5	25	9	10	10	10	8	3
04	Estonia	7	22	16	16	7	13	15	13	
05	United Kingdom	17	6	2	19	11	8	25	19	
06	Armenia	26	26	27	27	27	27	23	27	
07	Lithuania	12	3	7	4	4	4	26	16	
08	Serbia	19	14	8	20	16	16	3	6	5
09	Norway	2	1	1	1	3	1	6	2	10
10	Sweden	3	4	3	3	2	3	4	1	12
11	Cyprus	4	19	19	22	24	19	24	25	
12	Australia	5	8	14	10	8	6	5	3	8
13	Belgium	14	20	11	7	6	12	9	9	2
14	Austria	8	12	22	8	5	7	16	11	
15	Greece	22	25	15	21	18	23	19	22	
16	Montenegro	18	24	21	25	13	24	13	21	
17	Germany	23	18	17	17	20	21	11	17	
18	Poland	24	11	24	23	26	25	18	24	
19	Latvia	1	2	6	2	1	2	17	7	4
20	Romania	25	10	26	15	14	20	14	20	
21	Spain	21	16	9	18	9	15	8	10	1
22	Hungary	15	15	20	14	23	17	12	14	
23	Georgia	16	21	18	13	19	18	27	26	
24	Azerbaijan	13	23	10	24	25	22	20	23	
25	Russia	6	7	4	6	17	5	7	4	7
26	Albania	27	27	23	26	22	26	1	12	
27	Italy	20	13	12	11	15	14	2	5	6
