= In the Name of Love (Monika Kuszyńska song) =

2015 single by Monika Kuszyńska

Single by Monika Kuszyńska
- Released: 9 March 2015
- Genre: Pop
- Length: 2:56
- Label: Warner Music Poland
- Songwriter(s): Monika Kuszyńska, Jakub Raczyński
- Producer(s): Rafał Stępień

Monika Kuszyńska singles chronology
"Zostań chwilo" (2012)	"In the Name of Love" (2015)	"Nie ma rady na miłość" (2019)

Music video
- "In the Name of Love" on YouTube

Eurovision Song Contest 2015 entry
- Country: Poland
- Artist(s): Monika Kuszyńska
- Language: English
- Composer(s): Jakub Raczyński
- Lyricist(s): Monika Kuszyńska

Finals performance
- Semi-final result: 8th
- Semi-final points: 57
- Final result: 23rd
- Final points: 10

Entry chronology
- ◄ "My Słowianie" (2014)
- "Color of Your Life" (2016) ►

"In the Name of Love" is a song by Polish singer Monika Kuszyńska. It was released as the first single from her second solo studio album on 9 March 2015. The track was written by Monika Kuszyńska and Jakub Raczyński and was produced by Rafał Stępień. The song represented Poland in the Eurovision Song Contest 2015, where it reached 23rd place in general and 15th in televoting (with two jury votes).

The single was also recorded in Polish with the title "Obudź się i żyj" (Wake up and live) .

== Background ==
In the talk show Świat się kręci on 9 March 2015, it was announced that the Polish public broadcaster, TVP, had internally selected Monika Kuszyńska to represent Poland at the 2015 Eurovision Song Contest. During the program, Kuszyńska's song for the Eurovision Song Contest was officially revealed by TVP through the show of a music video for "In the Name of Love". The song was written by Monika Kuszyńska and Jakub Raczyński specifically for the Eurovision Song Contest.

== Music video ==
The music video premiered on YouTube on 9 March 2015. The video was directed by Roman Przylipiak. It was viewed more than 600,000 times in 24 hours. In the video, films and photos of the singer from times before her accident, which happened in 2006, were used.

== Track listing ==
Digital download
No.	Title	Length
1.	"In the Name of Love"	2:56

== Credits and personnel ==
- Monika Kuszyńska – vocals, lyrics
- Jakub Raczyński – music
- Rafał Stępień – producer, piano
- Marcin Gajko – mixing
- Karol Mańkowski – audio generator
- Michał Dąbrówka – drums
- Bartosz Wojciechowski – bass guitar
- Maciej Mąka – guitar
- Marta Kalińska – violin
- Paulina Wielgosińska – violin
- Małgorzata Sowierka Chmiel – viola
- Maria Katarzyna Filipiak – cello
- Aleksandra Tabiszewska, Jan Radwan, Natalia Bajak – backing vocals

Credits adapted from Discogs.

== Singer about her participation in ESC ==
Monika Kuszyńska about her participation in the Eurovision Song Contest said:

Through all my artistic efforts I try to link two worlds that up until recently seemed impossible to combine World of people with and without disabilities. Bridge of understanding between those two becomes stronger and stronger each year. I strongly believe that some day borders separating those worlds will disappear forever. This year Eurovision Song Contest motto is "Building Bridges" and it fits perfectly the idea I convey through my song. The contest's phrase also inspired me to write lyrics to "In the Name of Love". Because in the name of love we are able to overcome every barrier, aren't we?
