= Italy in the Eurovision Song Contest 2015 =

- Eurovision Song Contest 2015
- Participating broadcaster: Radiotelevisione italiana (RAI)
- Country: Italy
- Selection process: Sanremo Music Festival 2015
- Selection date: Artist: 14 February 2015; Song: 19 February 2015

Competing entry
- Song: "Grande amore"
- Artist: Il Volo
- Songwriters: Ciro Esposito; Francesco Boccia

Placement
- Final result: 3rd, 292 points

Participation chronology

Italy was represented at the Eurovision Song Contest 2015 with the song "Grande amore", written by Ciro Esposito and Francesco Boccia, and performed by the male operatic pop trio Il Volo. The Italian participating broadcaster, Radiotelevisione italiana (RAI), announced in September 2014 that the winning performer(s) of the Sanremo Music Festival 2015 would have the right to represent the country at the contest. The selected performer would also be given the right to choose their own song to compete with at Eurovision. In February 2015, Il Volo emerged as the winners of Sanremo with the song "Grande amore". The trio accepted the invitation to represent Italy at Eurovision and decided that "Grande amore" would be their contest entry.

As a member of the "Big Five" (France, Germany, Italy, Spain and the United Kingdom), Italy competed directly in the final on 23 May 2015 and did not have to qualify from one of two semi-finals held on 19 May and 21 May. However, Italy was obligated to vote in the second semi-final. In Italy's forty-second Eurovision appearance on 23 May, "Grande amore" finished in third place out of 27 competing songs, receiving 292 points and full marks from nine countries.

== Background ==
Prior to the 2015 contest, Radiotelevisione italiana (RAI) had participated in the Eurovision Song Contest representing Italy forty-one times since its first entry during the inaugural contest in 1956. Since then, it has won the contest on two occasions: in 1964 with the song "Non ho l'età" performed by Gigliola Cinquetti and in 1990 with the song "Insieme: 1992" performed by Toto Cutugno. RAI has withdrawn from the Eurovision Song Contest a number of times with its most recent absence spanning from 1998 until 2010. Its return in 2011 with the song "Madness of Love", performed by Raphael Gualazzi, placed second—their highest result, to this point, since their victory in 1990. It saw further success in 2012 and 2013, placing ninth and seventh, respectively. In 2014, "La mia città" by Emma finishing in 21st place.

As part of its duties as participating broadcaster, RAI organises the selection of its entry in the Eurovision Song Contest and broadcasts the event in the country. The broadcaster has previously organised national finals and internal selections to select its Eurovision entry. Between 2011 and 2013, RAI used the Sanremo Music Festival as an artist selection pool where a special committee would select one of the competing artist, independent of the results in the competition, as the Eurovision entrant. The selected entrant was then responsible for selecting the song they would compete with. For 2014, it forwent using the Sanremo Music Festival artist lineup and internally selected their entry. In 2015, RAI announced that the winning artist of the Sanremo Music Festival 2015 would be rewarded with the opportunity to represent Italy at the Eurovision Song Contest.

== Before Eurovision ==
=== Sanremo Music Festival 2015 ===
On 29 September 2014, Italian broadcaster RAI confirmed that the performer that would represent Italy at the 2015 Eurovision Song Contest would be selected from the competing artists at the Sanremo Music Festival 2015. According to the rules of Sanremo 2015, the winner of the Campioni or Big Artists category earns the right to represent Italy at the Eurovision Song Contest, but in case the artist is not available or refuses the offer, the organisers of the event reserve the right to choose another participant via their own criteria. The competition took place between 10–14 February 2015 with the winner being selected on the last day of the festival.

Twenty artists competed in the Big Artists category of Sanremo 2015. Among the competing artists were former Eurovision Song Contest entrants Raf who represented Italy in 1987 together with Umberto Tozzi, Lara Fabian who represented Luxembourg in 1988, and Nina Zilli who represented Italy in 2012. The performers in the "Big Artists" category were:

Artist	Song	Songwriter(s)
Alex Britti	"Un attimo importante"	Alex Britti
Anna Tatangelo	"Libera"	Francesco Silvestre, Enrico Palmosi
Annalisa	"Una finestra tra le stelle"	Francesco Silvestre
Bianca Atzei	"Il solo al mondo"	Francesco Silvestre
Biggio and Mandelli	"Vita d'inferno"	Fabrizio Biggio, Francesco Mandelli, Martino Ferro
Chiara	"Straordinario"	Ermal Meta, Gianni Pollex
Dear Jack	"Il mondo esplode tranne noi"	Piero Romitelli, Davide Simonetta
Gianluca Grignani	"Sogni infranti"	Gianluca Grignani
Grazia Di Michele and Mauro Coruzzi	"Io sono una finestra"	Grazia Di Michele, Raffaele Petrangeli
Il Volo	"Grande amore"	Ciro Esposito, Francesco Boccia
Irene Grandi	"Un vento senza nome"	Irene Grandi, Saverio Lanza
Lara Fabian	"Voce"	Lara Fabian, Fio Zanotti, Cristiano Cremonini
Lorenzo Fragola	"Siamo uguali"	Lorenzo Fragola, Federico Leonardo Lucia, Fausto Cogliati
Malika Ayane	"Adesso e qui (nostalgico presente)"	Malika Ayane, Gino De Crescenzo, Alessandra Flora, Giovanni Caccamo
Marco Masini	"Che giorno è"	Federica Camba, Daniele Coro, Marco Masini
Moreno	"Oggi ti parlo così"	Moreno Donadoni, Roberto Casalino, Massimiliano Dagani, Oscar Perticoni, Alessandro Erba, Marco Zangirolami
Nek	"Fatti avanti amore"	Filippo Neviani, Luca Chiaravalli, Andrea Bonomo, Gigi Fazio
Nesli	"Buona fortuna amore"	Francesco Tarducci, Orazio Grillo
Nina Zilli	"Sola"	Maria Chiara Fraschetta
Raf	"Come una favola"	Raffaele Riefoli, Saverio Grandi, Emiliano Cecere

==== Final ====
During the final evening of the Sanremo Music Festival 2015, Il Volo was selected as the winner with the song "Grande amore". RAI later confirmed during the closing press conference for the Sanremo Music Festival on 14 February 2015 that Il Volo had accepted to participate at Eurovision.

First Round – 14 February 2015
R/O	Artist	Song	Jury (30%)	Demoscopic Poll (30%)	Televote (40%)	Total	Place
1	Marco Masini	"Che giorno è"	3.75%	6.00%	5.97%	5.31%	6
2	Nina Zilli	"Sola"	5.63%	7.35%	1.86%	4.64%	9
3	Chiara	"Straordinario"	4.38%	8.50%	6.23%	6.35%	5
4	Dear Jack	"Il mondo esplode tranne noi"	0.00%	3.00%	10.42%	5.07%	7
5	Malika Ayane	"Adesso e qui (nostalgico presente)"	26.25%	9.43%	2.56%	11.73%	3
6	Nek	"Fatti avanti amore"	20.00%	11.92%	9.61%	13.42%	2
7	Il Volo	"Grande amore"	8.75%	13.38%	38.73%	22.13%	1
8	Annalisa	"Una finestra tra le stelle"	4.38%	8.65%	6.23%	6.40%	4
9	Alex Britti	"Un attimo importante"	5.00%	4.85%	1.14%	3.41%	11
10	Irene Grandi	"Un vento senza nome"	2.50%	6.067%	1.22%	3.06%	12
11	Lorenzo Fragola	"Siamo uguali"	2.50%	4.83%	6.05%	4.62%	10
12	Bianca Atzei	"Il solo al mondo"	0.63%	3.90%	2.26%	2.26%	14
13	Moreno	"Oggi ti parlo così"	1.88%	2.60%	2.03%	2.15%	15
14	Gianluca Grignani	"Sogni infranti"	11.25%	2.87%	1.63%	4.89%	8
15	Grazia Di Michele and Mauro Coruzzi	"Io sono una finestra"	0.63%	3.63%	1.52%	1.89%	16
16	Nesli	"Buona fortuna amore"	2.54%	3.02%	2.54%	2.67%	13

Second Round – 14 February 2015
R/O	Artist	Song	Jury (30%)	Demoscopic Poll (30%)	Televote (40%)	Total	Place
1	Il Volo	"Grande amore"	22.92%	32.3%	56.19%	39.05%	1
2	Nek	"Fatti avanti amore"	37.50%	35.94%	33.38%	35.38%	2
3	Malika Ayane	"Adesso e qui (nostalgico presente)"	39.58%	31.72%	10.44%	25.57%	3

=== Song selection ===
On 19 February 2015, RAI announced that Il Volo would perform their Sanremo song "Grande amore" at the Eurovision Song Contest 2015.

== At Eurovision ==
According to Eurovision rules, all nations with the exceptions of the host country and the "Big Five" (France, Germany, Italy, Spain and the United Kingdom) are required to qualify from one of two semi-finals in order to compete for the final; the top ten countries from each semi-final progress to the final. In the 2015 contest, Australia also competed directly in the final as an invited guest nation. As a member of the "Big Five", Italy automatically qualified to compete in the final on 23 May 2015. In addition to their participation in the final, Italy was also required to broadcast and vote in one of the two semi-finals. During the semi-final allocation draw on 26 January 2015, Italy was assigned to broadcast and vote in the second semi-final on 21 May 2015.

In Italy, the first semi-final was broadcast delayed and the second semi-final was broadcast live on Rai 4 with commentary by Marco Ardemagni and Filippo Solibello. The final was broadcast on Rai 2 with commentary by Federico Russo and Valentina Correani. All shows were also broadcast via radio on Rai Radio 2 with commentary by Marco Ardemagni and Filippo Solibello. The Italian spokesperson, who announced the Italian votes during the final, was Federico Russo.

=== Final ===
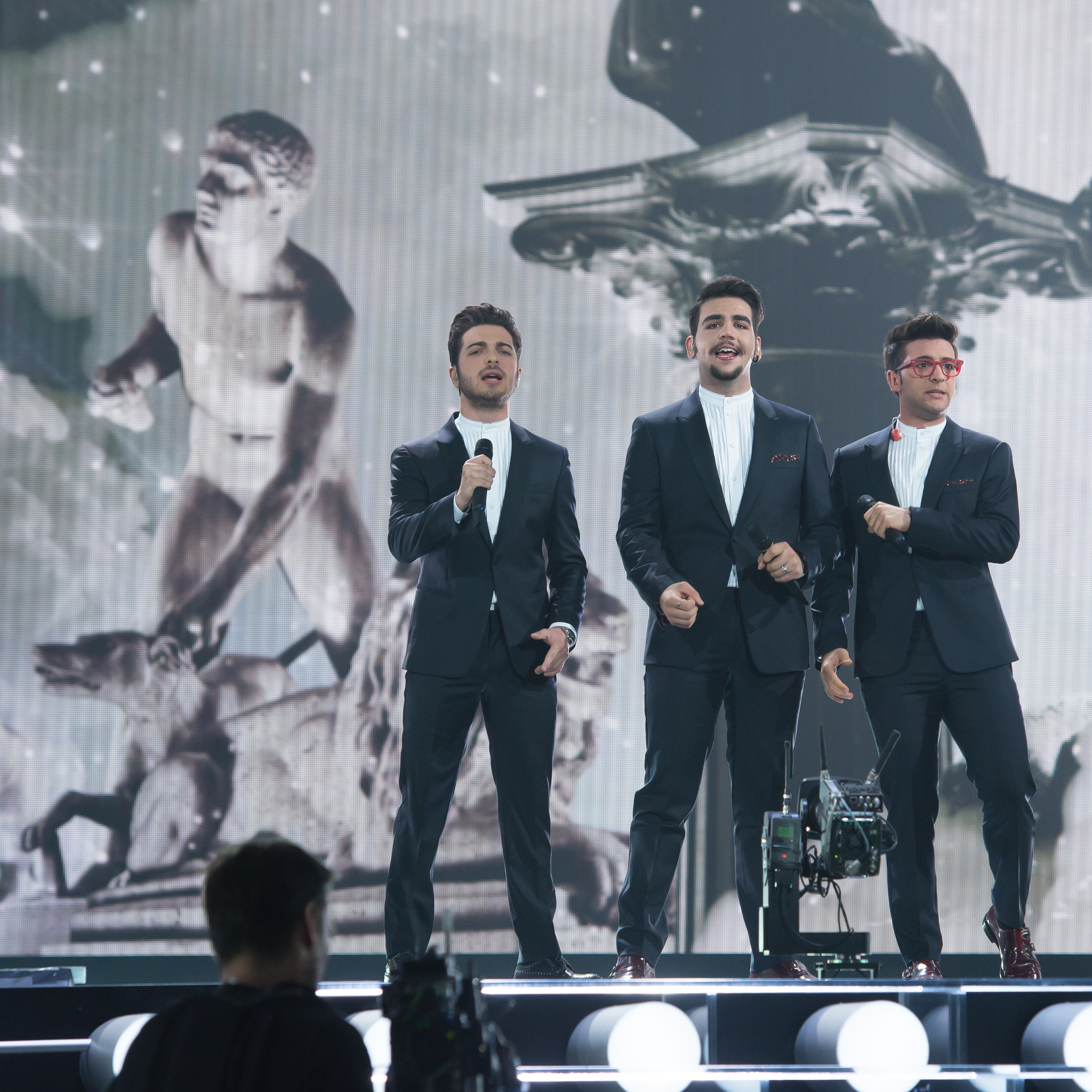
Il Volo at a dress rehearsal for the final

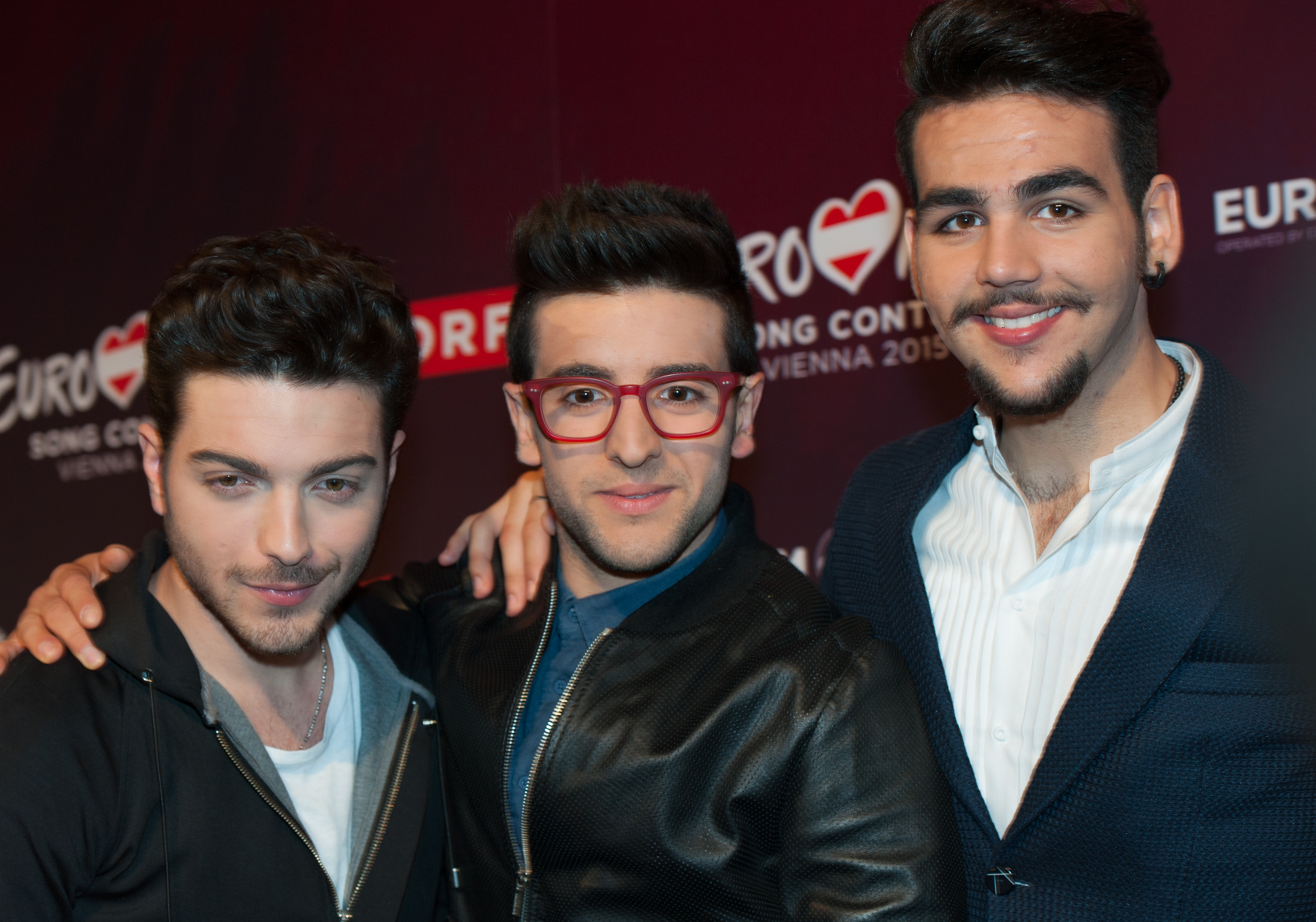
Il Volo during a press meet and greet

Il Volo took part in technical rehearsals on 17 and 20 May, followed by dress rehearsals on 22 and 23 May. This included the jury final where professional juries of each country, responsible for 50 percent of each country's vote, watched and voted on the competing entries. After technical rehearsals were held on 20 May, the "Big 5" countries, host nation Austria and special guest Australia held a press conference. As part of this press conference, the artists took part in a draw to determine which half of the grand final they would subsequently participate in. Italy was drawn to compete in the second half. Following the conclusion of the second semi-final, the shows' producers decided upon the running order of the final. The running order for the semi-finals and final was decided by the shows' producers rather than through another draw, so that similar songs were not placed next to each other. Italy was subsequently placed to perform last in position 27, following the entry from Albania.

The stage show featured the three members of Il Volo on stage dressed in dark suits. Il Volo's staging was kept simple, focusing attention onto the song and the performers. The background LED screens projected images of Roman columns, statues and busts with large billowing clouds of smoke displayed during the chorus. The stage lighting and colours were darker at the start of the song and intensified as the performance progressed.

At the conclusion of the voting, Italy finished in third place with 292 points behind Sweden and Russia, which placed first and second respectively. Italy received 12 points, the maximum number of points a country can give to another country, from nine countries.

==== Marcel Bezençon Awards ====
The Marcel Bezençon Awards, first awarded during the 2002 contest, are awards honouring the best competing songs in the final each year. Named after the creator of the annual contest, Marcel Bezençon, the awards are divided into 3 categories: the Press Award, given to the best entry as voted on by the accredited media and press during the event; the Artistic Award, presented to the best artist as voted on by the shows' commentators; and the Composer Award, given to the best and most original composition as voted by the participating composers. "Grande amore" was awarded the Press Award, which was accepted at the awards ceremony by the three members of Il Volo: Piero Barone, Ignazio Boschetto and Gianluca Ginoble.

=== Voting ===
Voting during the three shows consisted of 50 percent public televoting and 50 percent from a jury deliberation. The jury consisted of five music industry professionals who were citizens of the country they represent, with their names published before the contest to ensure transparency. This jury was asked to judge each contestant based on: vocal capacity; the stage performance; the song's composition and originality; and the overall impression by the act. In addition, no member of a national jury could be related in any way to any of the competing acts in such a way that they cannot vote impartially and independently. The individual rankings of each jury member were released shortly after the grand final.

Following the release of the full split voting by the EBU after the conclusion of the competition, it was revealed that Italy had won the public televote and placed sixth with the jury vote. In the public vote, Italy scored 366 points—an 80-point lead over Russia in second place with 286 points. The eventual winner Sweden placed third in the public televote with 279 points but was placed first by the juries with 353 points. Italy scored 171 points with the juries to finish sixth.

Below is a breakdown of points awarded to Italy and awarded by Italy in the second semi-final and grand final of the contest, and the breakdown of the jury voting and televoting conducted during the two shows:

==== Points awarded to Italy ====
Points awarded to Italy (Final)
Score	Country
12 points	Albania; Cyprus; Greece; Israel; Malta; Portugal; Romania; Russia; Spain
10 points	Austria; San Marino
8 points	Australia; Azerbaijan; Belgium; Georgia; Latvia; Slovenia; Sweden; United Kingdom
7 points	Czech Republic; Macedonia; Moldova; Netherlands; Poland; Serbia
6 points	Armenia; France; Iceland; Ireland; Montenegro; Switzerland
5 points	Denmark; Norway
4 points	
3 points	Estonia; Germany
2 points	Finland; Hungary
1 point	Belarus; Lithuania

==== Points awarded by Italy ====
Points awarded by Italy (Semi-final 2)
Score	Country
12 points	Israel
10 points	Sweden
8 points	Latvia
7 points	Cyprus
6 points	San Marino
5 points	Poland
4 points	Montenegro
3 points	Slovenia
2 points	Norway
1 point	Malta

Points awarded by Italy (Final)
Score	Country
12 points	Sweden
10 points	Russia
8 points	Israel
7 points	Belgium
6 points	Australia
5 points	Norway
4 points	Latvia
3 points	Serbia
2 points	Estonia
1 point	Poland

==== Detailed voting results ====
The following members comprised the Italian jury:

- Franco Zanetti (jury chairperson) – director of the music information website rockoll.it
- Valerio Paolini – co-founder and software architect of musixmatch
- Nicolò Cerioni – art director, stylist, videomaker
- Barbara Mosconi – journalist
- Flavia Cercato – radio and TV host

Detailed voting results from Italy (Semi-final 2)
R/O	Country	F. Zanetti	V. Paolini	N. Cerioni	B. Mosconi	F. Cercato	Jury Rank	Televote Rank	Combined Rank	Points	Televote(Percentage)
01	Lithuania	9	13	15	12	13	15	5	11		7.48%
02	Ireland	10	12	11	3	11	9	13	13		2.81%
03	San Marino	17	1	4	16	16	11	2	5	6	11.26%
04	Montenegro	6	14	7	10	9	8	7	7	4	5.61%
05	Malta	15	4	2	9	10	7	12	10	1	3.21%
06	Norway	3	5	3	8	7	5	11	9	2	3.41%
07	Portugal	1	11	8	6	5	6	14	12		2.75%
08	Czech Republic	16	15	12	17	17	17	10	14		3.63%
09	Israel	5	2	6	4	6	3	3	1	12	10.08%
10	Latvia	4	7	1	7	2	2	8	3	8	5.50%
11	Azerbaijan	13	6	9	14	15	13	17	16		1.59%
12	Iceland	12	10	13	13	8	12	16	15		2.23%
13	Sweden	8	8	5	1	1	4	4	2	10	8.36%
14	Switzerland	14	17	14	15	14	16	15	17		2.42%
15	Cyprus	2	3	10	2	3	1	9	4	7	3.64%
16	Slovenia	7	9	17	11	4	10	6	8	3	6.26%
17	Poland	11	16	16	5	12	14	1	6	5	19.76%

Detailed voting results from Italy (Final)
R/O	Country	F. Zanetti	V. Paolini	N. Cerioni	B. Mosconi	F. Cercato	Jury Rank	Televote Rank	Combined Rank	Points	Televote(Percentage)
01	Slovenia	16	16	19	14	7	14	18	18		1.23%
02	France	25	14	18	22	26	24	20	26		0.97%
03	Israel	13	2	5	3	4	6	6	3	8	3.32%
04	Estonia	19	8	16	10	8	9	13	9	2	1.59%
05	United Kingdom	10	9	23	6	15	10	26	21		0.57%
06	Armenia	21	18	24	19	23	23	19	24		1.00%
07	Lithuania	23	12	10	17	19	16	15	16		1.45%
08	Serbia	18	13	6	25	21	17	5	8	3	3.34%
09	Norway	3	1	3	4	1	1	16	6	5	1.41%
10	Sweden	7	6	1	1	5	2	8	1	12	2.88%
11	Cyprus	1	7	13	7	9	7	24	17		0.74%
12	Australia	9	3	4	2	2	3	12	5	6	1.66%
13	Belgium	4	5	7	5	3	4	10	4	7	1.94%
14	Austria	20	10	15	12	16	15	22	22		0.86%
15	Greece	17	23	14	23	22	22	11	19		1.73%
16	Montenegro	12	24	9	16	10	13	17	15		1.40%
17	Germany	24	15	22	13	20	21	21	25		0.88%
18	Poland	22	22	21	11	17	20	4	10	1	5.05%
19	Latvia	5	4	2	9	6	5	14	7	4	1.55%
20	Romania	11	25	25	24	24	26	2	13		22.48%
21	Spain	14	21	8	21	25	19	9	14		2.51%
22	Hungary	6	17	26	8	11	11	23	20		0.81%
23	Georgia	8	26	20	18	14	18	7	11		3.17%
24	Azerbaijan	15	11	11	20	13	12	25	23		0.67%
25	Russia	2	19	12	15	12	8	3	2	10	7.33%
26	Albania	26	20	17	26	18	25	1	12		29.46%
27	Italy										
