= Monika Kuszyńska =

Polish singer and songwriter (born 1980)

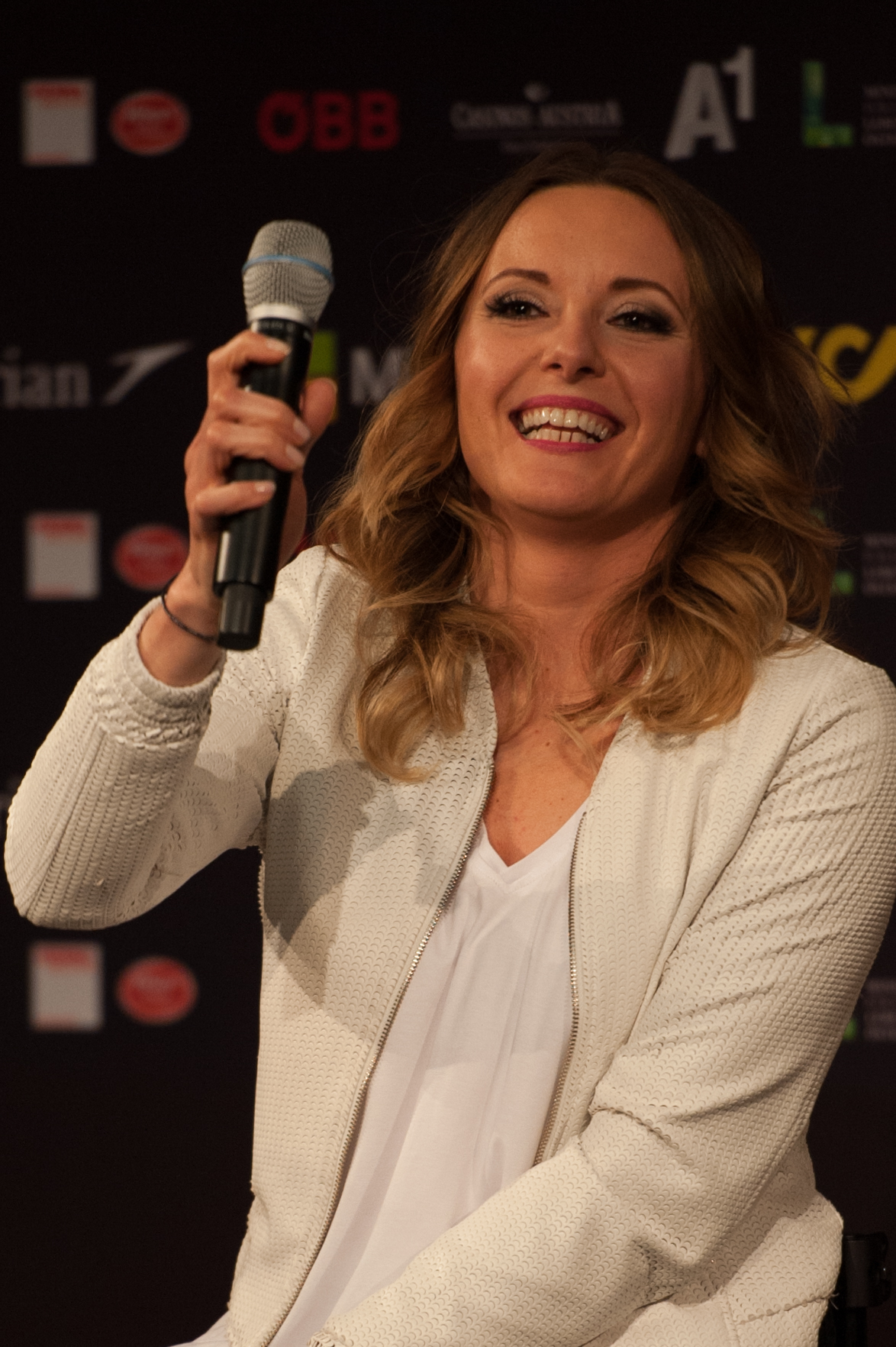
- Kuszyńska in 2015.

Background information
- Born: 14 January 1980 (age 46); Łódź, Poland
- Genres: Pop
- Occupation: Singer
- Instrument: Vocals
- Years active: 2000–present
- Label: EMI Music Poland

Monika Kuszyńska (born 14 January 1980) is a Polish singer and songwriter. She represented Poland in the Eurovision Song Contest 2015 with the song "In the Name of Love" and was previously the lead singer of the Polish pop rock band Varius Manx.

== Life and career ==
Kuszyńska entered the Polish music scene in 2000, when she was selected as the new vocalist of the Polish pop rock band Varius Manx, replacing Kasia Stankiewicz. In 2001, she released her first album with the band, titled Eta. The following year, she released her second album with them titled Eno. On 28 May 2006, Kuszyńska along with the other band members of Varius Manx were involved in a serious car accident in Milicz. The accident resulted in Kuszyńska becoming partially paralyzed from the waist down and having to use a wheelchair.

In February 2010, she was replaced by Anna Józefina Lubieniecka as the lead singer of Varius Manx. In June of the same year, Kuszyńska performed in public for the first time since her accident during Dzień Dobry TVN. In 2012, she was one of the coaches for the Polish version of Clash of the Choirs and placed fifth. On 9 March 2015, it was announced that Kuszyńska would represent Poland in the Eurovision Song Contest 2015 with the song "In the Name of Love". Monika performed in the second half of the second Eurovision semi-final, placing 8th with 57 points and ultimately qualified to the final. On 23 May she performed 18th in the running order between the Eurovision contestants from Germany and Latvia. She came 23rd in Grand Final with 10 points in the televote result Poland was ranked 15th, with 47 points Jury put her last 27th with 2 points.

Her biography Drugie Życie (My Second Life) was published on 4 November 2015.

On 5 March 2016, she guest-starred in the final of national eliminations to the 61st Eurovision Song Contest; she sang the Polish version of her Eurovision song "Obudź się i żyj" and later announced the winner of the show.

In May she was a member of the Polish jurors panel assessing the struggles of the participants of the 61st Eurovision Song Contest organized in Stockholm.

On 1 June 2017, she released the song "To taka Miłość", which she recorded along with the guest vocal of her husband, Jakub Raczyński. The work was dedicated to their son, who was born several months earlier.

Their daughter was born in December 2018.

== Discography ==
=== Solo ===
Title	Album details	Peak chart positions
Title	Album details	POL
Ocalona	Released: 12 June 2012; Label: EMI Music Poland; Format: CD, digital download	40

=== With Varius Manx ===
Title	Album details	Peak chart positions
Title	Album details	POL
Eta	Released: 27 August 2001; Label: Pomaton EMI; Formats: CD	13
Eno	Released: 19 October 2002; Label: Pomaton EMI; Formats: CD, digital download	15
Emi	Released: 31 March 2004; Label: Pomaton EMI; Formats: CD, digital download	—

== See also ==
- Poland in the Eurovision Song Contest 2015

Awards and achievements
Preceded by Cleo & Donatan with "My Słowianie – We Are Slavic"	Poland in the Eurovision Song Contest; 2015	Succeeded by Michał Szpak with "Color of Your Life"
