= Israel in the Eurovision Song Contest 2015 =

- Eurovision Song Contest 2015
- Country: Israel
- Selection process: Artist: HaKokhav HaBa; Song: Internal selection
- Selection date: Artist: 17 February 2015; Song: 12 March 2015

Competing entry
- Song: "Golden Boy"
- Artist: Nadav Guedj
- Songwriters: Doron Medalie

Placement
- Semi-final result: Qualified (3rd, 151 points)
- Final result: 9th, 97 points

Participation chronology

Israel was represented at the Eurovision Song Contest 2015 with the song "Golden Boy", written by Doron Medalie and performed by Nadav Guedj. The Israeli broadcaster Israel Broadcasting Authority (IBA) collaborated with the commercial broadcaster Keshet in order to select the Israeli entry for the 2015 contest in Vienna, Austria. The reality singing competition HaKokhav HaBa ("The Next Star"), which was organised by Keshet, was used to select the artist that would represent Israel. Nadav Guedj emerged as the winner of the competition in a final that took place in February 2015. The song "Golden Boy" was later internally selected as the song Guedj would perform at Eurovision and was presented to the public in March 2015.

In the second of the Eurovision semi-finals, "Golden Boy" placed third out of the 17 participating countries, securing its place among the 27 other songs in the final. The last time Israel had featured in a final was in 2010. In Israel's thirty-eighth Eurovision appearance on 23 May, "Golden Boy" finished in ninth place, receiving 97 points.

== Background ==
Prior to the 2015 contest, Israel had participated in the Eurovision Song Contest thirty-seven times since its first entry in 1973. Israel has won the contest on three occasions: in 1978 with the song "A-Ba-Ni-Bi" performed by Izhar Cohen and the Alphabeta, in 1979 with the song "Hallelujah" performed by Milk and Honey, and in 1998 with the song "Diva" performed by Dana International. Since the introduction of semi-finals to the format of the Eurovision Song Contest in 2004, Israel has, to this point, managed to qualify to the final five times, including two top ten results in 2005 with Shiri Maimon and "HaSheket SheNish'ar" placing fourth and in 2008 with Boaz and "The Fire in Your Eyes" placing ninth. Between 2011 and 2014, Israel has failed to qualify to the final consecutively, which included their 2014 entry "Same Heart" performed by Mei Finegold.

Israel's participation in the 2015 Contest was initially uncertain after the Israeli government voted to shut down state broadcaster IBA and establish a new broadcaster. On 15 September 2014, IBA confirmed that it had submitted a preliminary application to participate in the contest. On 13 November 2014, IBA fully confirmed that Israel would compete at the 2015 Eurovision Song Contest. IBA opted to collaborate with commercial broadcaster Keshet and production company Tedy Productions in order to select the Israeli entry for the 2015 Contest. This is the second time IBA has collaborated with these entities; they previously worked together to select the 2008 Israeli entry.

== Before Eurovision ==
Following IBA's preliminary application in September 2014, IBA consulted with the editors of radio 88FM in order to generate a shortlist of potential artists for the 2015 contest. Marina Maximilian Blumin topped the list, followed by Ester Rada and Asaf Avidan. However, shortly after the publication of the list, Israeli media reported that Blumin had turned down an offer to represent Israel at the contest. In October 2014, media reports indicated that IBA would cooperate with commercial broadcaster Keshet in order to select the Israeli entry through the reality singing competition HaKokhav HaBa ("The Next Star"). The collaboration with Keshet was later confirmed by IBA in November 2014.

=== HaKokhav HaBa ===
The Israeli artist for the Eurovision Song Contest 2015 was selected through second season of the reality singing competition HaKokhav HaBa ("The Next Star"), the original version of the international format Rising Star produced by Tedy Productions and Keshet Media Group. The shows were hosted by Assi Azar and Rotem Sela and featured a judging panel composed of Assaf Etedgi, Muki, Keren Peles and Harel Skaat (2010 Israeli Eurovision entrant). The competition consisted of eighteen shows, which commenced on 9 December 2014 and concluded on 17 February 2015. All shows in the competition were broadcast on Channel 2 as well as online via mako.co.il.

==== Contestant progress ====
Following an audition phase, a judges selection round and duel phase, ten artists were shortlisted to compete and the four finalists were: Avia Shoshani, Iky Levy and the Rasta Hebrew Men, Nadav Guedj and Sari Nachmias.

Contestant progress
Artists	Result	Ref(s)
Nadav Guedj	Winner on 17 February 2015	
Iky Levy and the Rasta Hebrew Men	Runner-up on 17 February 2015	
Sari Nachmias	Third place on 17 February 2015	
Avia Shoshani	Eliminated – 4th Place on 17 February 2015	
Orit Biansey	Eliminated – 5th Place on 8 February 2015	
Sa'ar "Rusty" Davidov	Eliminated – 6th Place on 8 February 2015	
Nava Tehila Walker	Eliminated – 7th Place on 1 February 2015	
Yifi and Osher Aricha	Eliminated – 8th Place on 27 January 2015	
Lirose Balas	Eliminated – 9th Place on 25 January 2015	
Asif Zilberman	Eliminated – 10th Place on 25 January 2015	

==== Final ====
The final took place on 17 February 2015 at the G.G. Studios in Neve Ilan. The winner was selected in two rounds. In the first round the four performers competed in duels and each performed a cover song. The two duel winners advanced to the second round based on a public vote as well as votes from each member of the judging panel who had the option of boosting the performer's score by 3%. The two duel winners were Iky Levy & The Rasta Hebrew Men and Nadav Guedj. The judging panel alone selected a third performer from the two that did not win their duels to enter the second round. Due to a tie among the judging panel's choice, the tie was broken after Sari Nachmias was revealed to have received a higher seasonal average score. In the second round, the three performers that advanced from the first round performed another cover song and the winner, Nadav Guedj, was selected solely by a public vote. The public vote that took place in both rounds was conducted entirely through a mobile application.

Final – First Round – 17 February 2015
Duel	Draw	Artist	Song (Original artists)	Public Vote	Result
I	1	Iky Levy and the Rasta Hebrew Men	"Lihiyot adam" (Zohar Argov)	52%	Advanced
I	2	Avia Shoshani	"Mishe'u pa'am" (Ivri Lider)	49%	Eliminated
II	1	Nadav Guedj	"Crazy in Love" (Beyoncé)	79%	Advanced
II	2	Sari Nachmias	"Fix You" (Coldplay)	65%	Saved

Final – Second Round – 17 February 2015
Draw	Artist	Song (Original artists)	Public Vote	Place
1	Iky Levy and the Rasta Hebrew Men	"Imagine" (John Lennon)	69%	2
2	Sari Nachmias	"Feeling Good" (Nina Simone)	49%	3
3	Nadav Guedj	"All of Me" (John Legend)	79%	1

=== Song selection ===
On 26 February 2015, it was announced that a special committee consisting of representatives from IBA, Keshet and Tedy Productions had selected the song "Golden Boy", written by Doron Medalie, for Nadav Guedj to perform at the Eurovision Song Contest in Vienna. The Israeli newspaper Israel Hayom described the song an "uptempo Mediterranean" song that was entirely in the English language—a first for an Israeli entry at the contest. The song and official video were presented on 12 March during a special presentation programme aired on IBA's Channel 1.

== At Eurovision ==
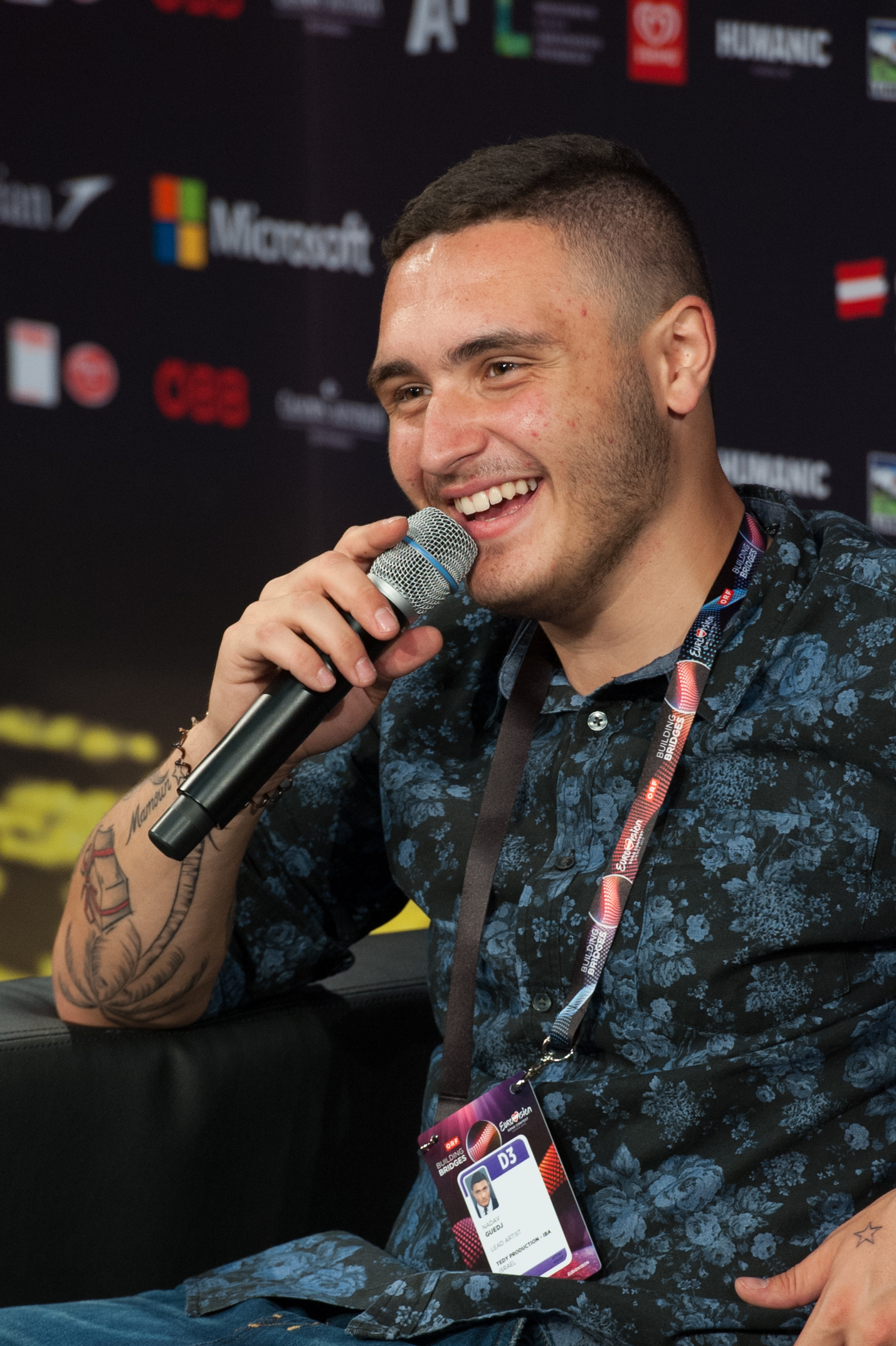
Nadav Guedj at a press meet and greet

According to Eurovision rules, all nations with the exceptions of the host country and the "Big Five" (France, Germany, Italy, Spain and the United Kingdom) are required to qualify from one of two semi-finals in order to compete for the final; the top ten countries from each semi-final progress to the final. In the 2015 contest, Australia also competed directly in the final as an invited guest nation. The European Broadcasting Union (EBU) split up the competing countries into five different pots based on voting patterns from previous contests, with countries with favourable voting histories put into the same pot. On 26 January 2015, a special allocation draw was held which placed each country into one of the two semi-finals, as well as which half of the show they would perform in. Israel was placed into the second semi-final, to be held on 21 May 2015, and was scheduled to perform in the second half of the show.

Once all the competing songs for the 2015 contest had been released, the running order for the semi-finals was decided by the shows' producers rather than through another draw, so that similar songs were not placed next to each other. Israel was set to perform in position 9, following the entry from the Czech Republic and before the entry from Latvia.

In Israel, the semi-finals and final were televised on Channel 1 with Hebrew subtitles and Channel 33 with Arabic subtitles. All three shows were also broadcast via radio on 88 FM with commentary by Kobi Menora, who was joined by Yuval Caspin for the first semi-final and Tal Argaman for the second semi-final. The Israeli spokesperson, who announced the Israeli votes during the final, was Ofer Nachshon.

=== Semi-final ===
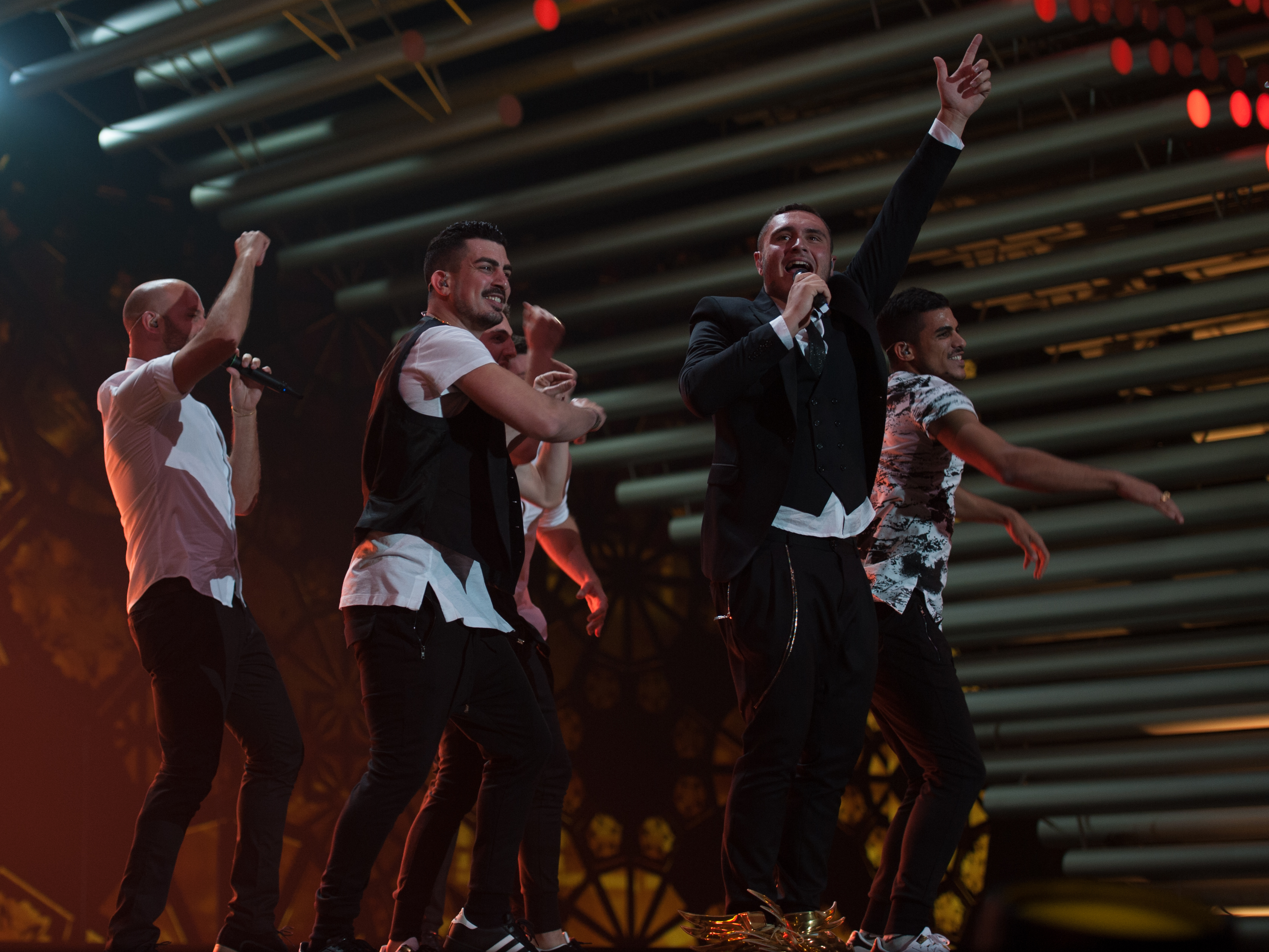
Nadav Guedj at a dress rehearsal for the second semi-final

Nadav Guedj took part in technical rehearsals on 14 and 16 May, followed by dress rehearsals on 20 and 21 May. This included the jury final where professional juries of each country, responsible for 50 percent of each country's vote, watched and voted on the competing entries.

The stage show featured Nadav Guedj dressed in a black and white suit with golden shoes, performing a choreographed routine together with his five supporting performers. Guedj was joined by two backing vocalists, Hananel Edri and Imri Ziv (Who would represent Israel at the Eurovision Song Contest 2017), and three backing dancers, Dor Raybi, Tomer Tenenboim and Adam Cohen. The performance began in muted dark blue lighting which transitioned to yellow and red flashing colours as the song progressed. The background LED screens displayed Asian inspired window panes that also changed colours throughout the performance.

At the end of the show, Israel was announced as having finished in the top ten and subsequently qualifying for the grand final. It was later revealed that the Israel placed third in the semi-final, receiving a total of 151 points.

=== Final ===
Shortly after the second semi-final, a winner's press conference was held for the ten qualifying countries. As part of this press conference, the qualifying artists took part in a draw to determine which half of the grand final they would subsequently participate in. This draw was done in the order the countries were announced during the semi-final. Israel was drawn to compete in the first half. Following this draw, the shows' producers decided upon the running order of the final, as they had done for the semi-finals. Israel was subsequently placed to perform in position 3, after the entry from France and before the entry from Estonia.

Guedj once again took part in dress rehearsals on 22 and 23 May before the final, including the jury final where the professional juries cast their final votes before the live show. Guedj performed a repeat of his semi-final performance during the final on 23 May. At the conclusion of the voting, Israel placed ninth with 97 points.

=== Voting ===
Voting during the three shows consisted of 50 percent public televoting and 50 percent from a jury deliberation. The jury consisted of five music industry professionals who were citizens of the country they represent, with their names published before the contest to ensure transparency. This jury was asked to judge each contestant based on: vocal capacity; the stage performance; the song's composition and originality; and the overall impression by the act. In addition, no member of a national jury could be related in any way to any of the competing acts in such a way that they cannot vote impartially and independently. The individual rankings of each jury member were released shortly after the grand final.

Following the release of the full split voting by the EBU after the conclusion of the competition, it was revealed that Israel had placed seventh with the public televote and eighth with the jury vote in the final. In the public vote, Israel scored 104 points, while with the jury vote, Israel scored 77 points. In the second semi-final, Israel placed second with the public televote with 157 points and fourth with the jury vote, scoring 114 points.

Below is a breakdown of points awarded to Israel and awarded by Israel in the second semi-final and grand final of the contest, and the breakdown of the jury voting and televoting conducted during the two shows:

==== Points awarded to Israel ====
Points awarded to Israel (Semi-final 2)
Score	Country
12 points	Italy; United Kingdom
10 points	Cyprus; Malta; Poland; Portugal; Sweden
8 points	Azerbaijan; Germany; Iceland; Ireland; Norway
7 points	Australia; Switzerland
6 points	San Marino
5 points	Slovenia
4 points	Lithuania
3 points	Latvia; Montenegro
2 points	Czech Republic
1 point	

Points awarded to Israel (Final)
Score	Country
12 points	
10 points	
8 points	Italy
7 points	Azerbaijan; Portugal
6 points	Cyprus; Serbia
5 points	Albania; Germany; Iceland; Malta; Netherlands; United Kingdom
4 points	Norway; Poland; Sweden
3 points	Finland; Montenegro; Switzerland
2 points	Australia; Austria; Belarus; San Marino
1 point	Georgia; Latvia; Romania; Spain

==== Points awarded by Israel ====
Points awarded by Israel (Semi-final 2)
Score	Country
12 points	Sweden
10 points	Malta
8 points	Czech Republic
7 points	Montenegro
6 points	Slovenia
5 points	Cyprus
4 points	Lithuania
3 points	Azerbaijan
2 points	Latvia
1 point	Norway

Points awarded by Israel (Final)
Score	Country
12 points	Italy
10 points	Sweden
8 points	Russia
7 points	Australia
6 points	Slovenia
5 points	Romania
4 points	Belgium
3 points	Estonia
2 points	Serbia
1 point	Spain

==== Detailed voting results ====
The following members comprised the Israeli jury:

- Liora Simon (Liora; jury chairperson) – singer, represented Israel in the 1995 contest
- Chen Metzger – music producer
- Lauren De Paz – singer, songwriter
- Rafi Weinstock – actor, singer
- Dalit Cahana – vocal coach

Detailed voting results from Israel (Semi-final 2)
Draw	Country	Liora	C. Metzger	L. De Paz	R. Weinstock	D. Cahana	Jury Rank	Televote Rank	Combined Rank	Points
01	Lithuania	14	8	12	2	6	8	6	7	4
02	Ireland	10	12	14	12	10	13	12	14	
03	San Marino	16	10	16	10	15	15	14	16	
04	Montenegro	3	14	5	9	8	7	2	4	7
05	Malta	2	4	3	3	4	2	5	2	10
06	Norway	15	15	11	15	12	16	4	10	1
07	Portugal	13	16	4	8	16	12	11	12	
08	Czech Republic	9	6	10	6	2	5	3	3	8
09	Israel									
10	Latvia	11	11	7	7	14	10	9	9	2
11	Azerbaijan	12	9	9	16	9	11	7	8	3
12	Iceland	8	13	13	13	13	14	13	15	
13	Sweden	1	2	2	1	1	1	1	1	12
14	Switzerland	6	7	6	11	5	6	16	11	
15	Cyprus	4	3	8	4	3	3	10	6	5
16	Slovenia	7	1	1	5	11	4	8	5	6
17	Poland	5	5	15	14	7	9	15	13	

Detailed voting results from Israel (Final)
Draw	Country	Liora	C. Metzger	L. De Paz	R. Weinstock	D. Cahana	Jury Rank	Televote Rank	Combined Rank	Points
01	Slovenia	7	2	1	7	16	4	12	5	6
02	France	16	22	20	11	21	20	18	21	
03	Israel									
04	Estonia	6	8	24	15	15	13	10	8	3
05	United Kingdom	19	11	17	13	12	15	11	11	
06	Armenia	20	23	23	19	19	24	3	14	
07	Lithuania	18	9	10	12	4	8	19	15	
08	Serbia	9	12	13	9	14	9	14	9	2
09	Norway	17	13	11	21	17	16	15	19	
10	Sweden	1	3	3	2	1	2	4	2	10
11	Cyprus	15	4	12	5	6	6	20	12	
12	Australia	5	5	5	3	2	3	6	4	7
13	Belgium	12	25	14	10	20	17	5	7	4
14	Austria	24	6	18	6	9	10	26	20	
15	Greece	14	26	22	18	5	19	24	24	
16	Montenegro	13	24	4	16	8	11	17	16	
17	Germany	8	7	8	4	10	5	21	13	
18	Poland	11	15	21	26	11	18	23	23	
19	Latvia	25	16	15	17	25	22	9	18	
20	Romania	10	10	19	8	22	14	7	6	5
21	Spain	4	21	7	23	13	12	13	10	1
22	Hungary	21	18	25	24	24	25	22	25	
23	Georgia	22	17	9	20	23	21	8	17	
24	Azerbaijan	26	14	16	25	18	23	16	22	
25	Russia	3	19	6	14	7	7	1	3	8
26	Albania	23	20	26	22	26	26	25	26	
27	Italy	2	1	2	1	3	1	2	1	12
