= Poland in the Eurovision Song Contest 2015 =

- Eurovision Song Contest 2015
- Participating broadcaster: Telewizja Polska (TVP)
- Country: Poland
- Selection process: Internal selection
- Announcement date: 9 March 2015

Competing entry
- Song: "In the Name of Love"
- Artist: Monika Kuszyńska
- Songwriters: Kuba Raczyński; Monika Kuszyńska

Placement
- Semi-final result: Qualified (8th, 57 points)
- Final result: 23rd, 10 points

Participation chronology

Poland was represented at the Eurovision Song Contest 2015 with the song "In the Name of Love" written by Kuba Raczyński and Monika Kuszyńska. The song was performed by Monika Kuszyńska. In March 2015, the Polish broadcaster Telewizja Polska (TVP) announced that the Polish entry for the 2015 contest in Vienna, Austria would be selected through an internal selection. Kuszyńska and the song "In the Name of Love" were announced as the Polish entry on 9 March 2015 during the TVP1 programme Świat się kręci.

Poland was drawn to compete in the second semi-final of the Eurovision Song Contest which took place on 21 May 2015. Performing as the closing entry during the show in position 17, "In the Name of Love" was announced among the top 10 entries of the second semi-final and therefore qualified to compete in the final on 23 May. It was later revealed that Poland placed eighth out of the 17 participating countries in the semi-final with 57 points. In the final, Poland performed in position 18 and placed twenty-third out of the 27 participating countries, scoring 10 points.

== Background ==
Prior to the 2015 contest, Poland had participated in the Eurovision Song Contest seventeen times since its first entry in 1994. Poland's highest placement in the contest, to this point, has been second place, which the nation achieved with its debut entry in 1994 with the song "To nie ja!" performed by Edyta Górniak. Poland has only, thus far, reached the top ten on one other occasion, when Ich Troje performing the song "Keine Grenzen – Żadnych granic" finished seventh in 2003. Between 2005 and 2011, Poland failed to qualify from the semi-final round six out of seven years with only their 2008 entry, "For Life" performed by Isis Gee, managing to take the nation to the final during that period. After once again failing to qualify to the final in 2011, the country withdrew from the contest during 2012 and 2013. Poland returned to the contest in 2014 and managed to qualify to the final with their entry "My Słowianie - We Are Slavic" performed by Donatan and Cleo.

The Polish national broadcaster, Telewizja Polska (TVP), broadcasts the event within Poland and organises the selection process for the nation's entry. TVP confirmed Poland's participation in the 2015 Eurovision Song Contest on 10 October 2014. Between 2006 and 2011, TVP organised televised national finals that featured a competition among several artists and songs in order to select the Polish entry for the Eurovision Song Contest. After returning to the contest in 2014 following their two-year absence, the broadcaster opted to internally select the 2014 entry, a selection procedure that continued for their 2015 entry.

== Before Eurovision ==
=== Internal selection ===
The Polish entry for the 2015 Eurovision Song Contest was selected by TVP via an internal selection in collaboration with OGAE Poland. Among the artists rumoured to have been selected by the broadcaster included Anna Wyszkoni, Agnieszka Chylińska, Doda, Halina Mlynkova, Margaret and Sylwia Grzeszczak, while Edyta Górniak, who represented Poland in the Eurovision Song Contest in 1994, was also revealed to have submitted an entry to TVP for consideration. On 8 March 2015, it was announced that the Polish entry would be presented the next day during the TVP1 programme Świat się kręci, hosted by Agata Młynarska and Maciej Kurzajewski.

During the broadcast of Świat się kręci on 9 March, it was announced that Monika Kuszyńska would represent Poland with the song "In the Name of Love", written by Kuszyńska herself together with her husband Kuba Raczyński. The song was also presented to the public the same day via the release of the official music video, directed by Roman Przylipiak. Kuszyńska was previously the lead singer of the group Varius Manx, which previously attempted to represent Poland at the Eurovision Song Contest in 2003 with the song "Sonny", until she experienced a car accident in 2006 which left her partially paralysed. A Polish language version of the song, titled "Obudź się i Żyj", was also recorded and released following the announcement.

Through all my artistic efforts I try to link two worlds that up until recently seemed impossible to combine world of people with and without disabilities. Bridge of understanding between those two becomes stronger and stronger each year. I strongly believe that some day borders separating those worlds will disappear forever. This year Eurovision Song Contest motto is Building Bridges and it fits perfectly the idea I convey through my song. The contest's phrase also inspired me to write lyrics to "In the Name of Love". Because in the name of love we are able to overcome every barrier, aren't we?

— Monika Kuszyńska about "In the Name of Love"

=== Promotion ===
Monika Kuszyńska made several appearances across Europe to specifically promote "In the Name of Love" as the Polish Eurovision entry. On 17 April, Kuszyńska performed during the Eurovision PreParty Riga, which was organised by OGAE Latvia and held at the Palladium Concert Hall in Riga. On 18 April, Kuszyńska performed during the Eurovision in Concert event which was held at the Melkweg venue in Amsterdam, Netherlands and hosted by Cornald Maas and Edsilia Rombley. In addition to her international appearances, Monika Kuszyńska also completed promotional activities in Poland where she performed "In the Name of Love" during a joint TVP press conference with Austrian broadcaster ORF in Kraków on 16 April.

== At Eurovision ==
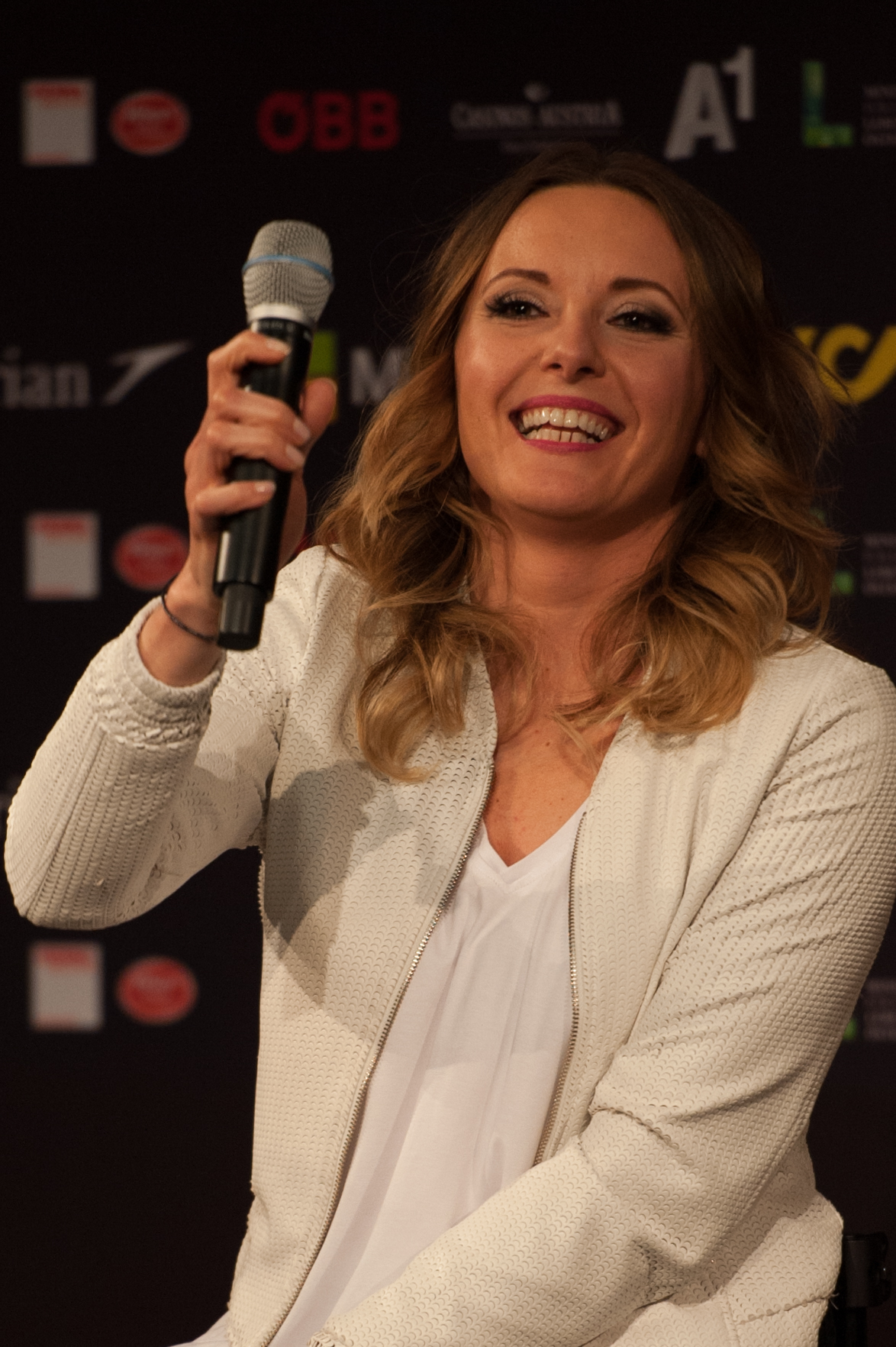
Monika Kuszyńska at a press meet and greet

According to Eurovision rules, all nations with the exceptions of the host country and the "Big Five" (France, Germany, Italy, Spain and the United Kingdom) are required to qualify from one of two semi-finals in order to compete for the final; the top ten countries from each semi-final progress to the final. In the 2015 contest, Australia also competed directly in the final as an invited guest nation. The European Broadcasting Union (EBU) split up the competing countries into five different pots based on voting patterns from previous contests, with countries with favourable voting histories put into the same pot. On 26 January 2015, a special allocation draw was held which placed each country into one of the two semi-finals, as well as which half of the show they would perform in. Poland was placed into the second semi-final, to be held on 21 May 2015, and was scheduled to perform in the second half of the show.

Once all the competing songs for the 2015 contest had been released, the running order for the semi-finals was decided by the shows' producers rather than through another draw, so that similar songs were not placed next to each other. Poland was set to perform last in position 17, following the entry from Slovenia.

The two semi-finals and the final were broadcast in Poland on TVP1 and TVP Polonia with commentary by Artur Orzech. The three shows were also aired on a one-day delay on the channels TVP Rozrywka and TVP HD. The Polish spokesperson, who announced the Polish votes during the final, was Ola Ciupa.

=== Semi-final ===
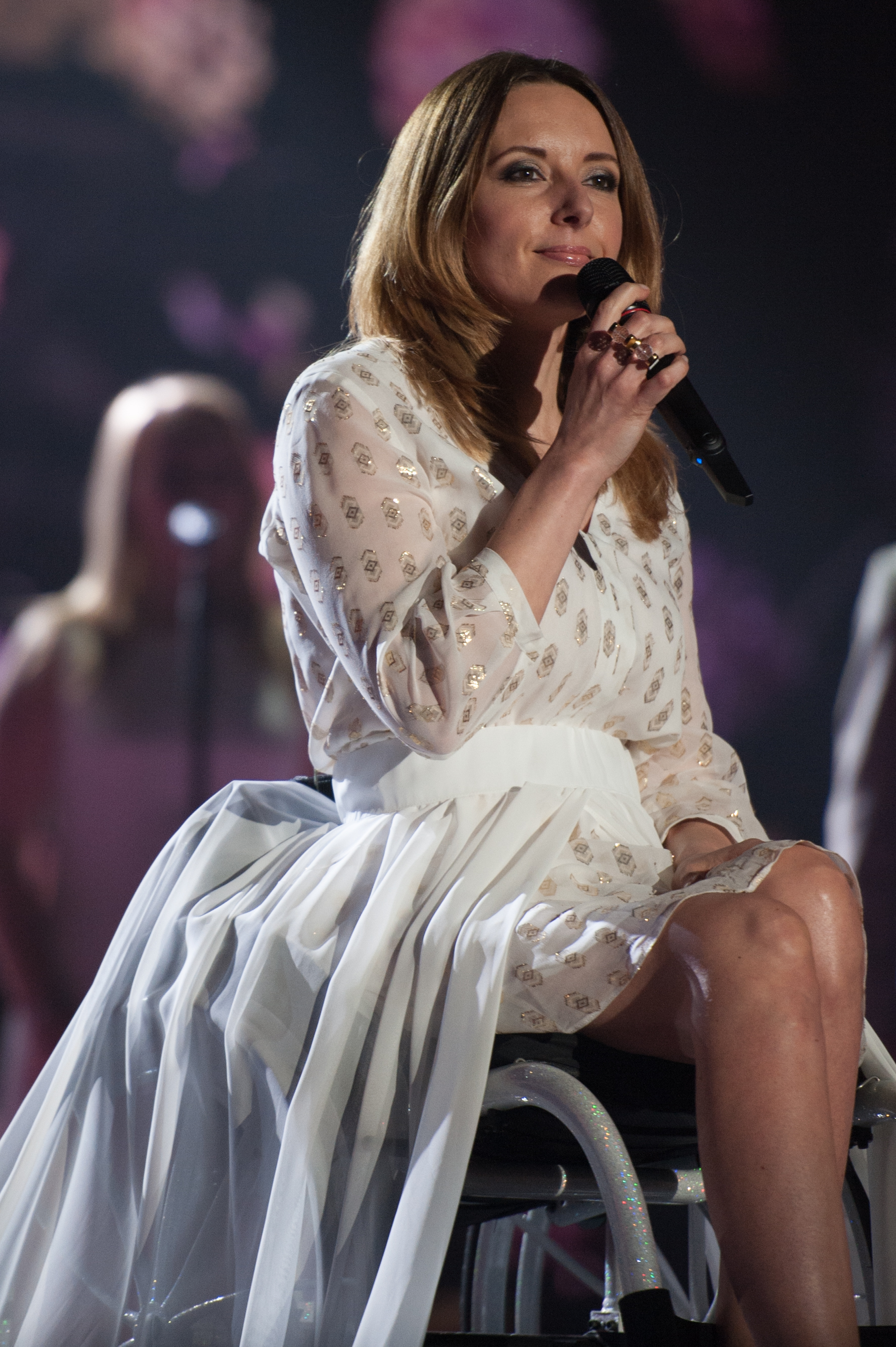
Monika Kuszyńska during a rehearsal before the second semi-final

Monika Kuszyńska took part in technical rehearsals on 14 and 16 May, followed by dress rehearsals on 20 and 21 May. This included the jury show on 20 May where the professional juries of each country watched and voted on the competing entries

The Polish performance featured Monika Kuszyńska seated in a wheelchair wearing a white dress with long trains flanked by three backing vocalists on one side and a pianist on the other side. The stage lighting displayed predominately purple and pink colours with the LED screens displaying blossoming trees and waving white veils. An additional feature of the performance included the use of the screens on each side of the stage to display black and white images from Monika's past. The three backing vocalists that joined Kuszyńska on stage were: Ola Tabiszewska, Jan Radwan and Natalia Bajak, while the pianist was the co-composer of "In the Name of Love" and her husband Kuba Raczyński.

At the end of the show, Poland was announced as having finished in the top ten and subsequently qualifying for the grand final. It was later revealed that the Poland placed eighth in the semi-final, receiving a total of 57 points.

=== Final ===
Shortly after the second semi-final, a winner's press conference was held for the ten qualifying countries. As part of this press conference, the qualifying artists took part in a draw to determine which half of the grand final they would subsequently participate in. This draw was done in the order the countries were announced during the semi-final. Poland was drawn to compete in the second half. Following this draw, the shows' producers decided upon the running order of the final, as they had done for the semi-finals. Poland was subsequently placed to perform in position 18, following the entry from Germany and before the entry from Latvia.

Monika Kuszyńska once again took part in dress rehearsals on 22 and 23 May before the final, including the jury final where the professional juries cast their final votes before the live show. Monika Kuszyńska performed a repeat of her semi-final performance during the final on 23 May. At the conclusion of the voting, Poland placed twenty-third with 10 points.

=== Voting ===
Voting during the three shows consisted of 50 percent public televoting and 50 percent from a jury deliberation. Each nation's jury consisted of five music industry professionals who are citizens of the country they represent, with their names published before the contest to ensure transparency. This jury judged each entry based on: vocal capacity; the stage performance; the song's composition and originality; and the overall impression by the act. In addition, no member of a national jury was permitted to be related in any way to any of the competing acts in such a way that they cannot vote impartially and independently. The individual rankings of each jury member were released shortly after the grand final.

Below is a breakdown of points awarded to Poland and awarded by Poland in the second semi-final and grand final of the contest, and the breakdown of the jury voting and televoting conducted during the two shows:

==== Points awarded to Poland ====
Points awarded to Poland (Semi-final 2)
Score	Country
12 points	
10 points	
8 points	
7 points	
6 points	Malta
5 points	Ireland; Italy; Latvia; Lithuania; Norway; Sweden
4 points	Cyprus; United Kingdom
3 points	Germany; Iceland
2 points	Portugal; Slovenia; Switzerland
1 point	Australia

Points awarded to Poland (Final)
Score	Country
12 points	
10 points	
8 points	
7 points	
6 points	
5 points	
4 points	France
3 points	Ireland
2 points	United Kingdom
1 point	Italy

==== Points awarded by Poland ====
Points awarded by Poland (Semi-final 2)
Score	Country
12 points	Sweden
10 points	Israel
8 points	Czech Republic
7 points	Latvia
6 points	Norway
5 points	Slovenia
4 points	Cyprus
3 points	Azerbaijan
2 points	Iceland
1 point	Switzerland

Points awarded by Poland (Final)
Score	Country
12 points	Sweden
10 points	Latvia
8 points	Australia
7 points	Italy
6 points	Russia
5 points	Belgium
4 points	Israel
3 points	Norway
2 points	Estonia
1 point	Slovenia

==== Detailed voting results ====
The following members comprised the Polish jury:

- Krzysztof Szewczyk (jury chairperson) – journalist
- Maria Szabłowska – journalist
- Witold Czamara (Donatan) – music producer, represented Poland in the 2014 contest
- Tomasz Żąda – journalist
- Natalia Szroeder – singer, musician

Detailed voting results from Poland (Semi-final 2)
R/O	Country	K. Szewczyk	M. Szabłowska	Donatan	T. Żąda	N. Szroeder	Jury Rank	Televote Rank	Combined Rank	Points
01	Lithuania	13	13	16	16	11	14	9	12	
02	Ireland	8	6	15	11	8	10	12	11	
03	San Marino	16	14	12	15	16	16	15	16	
04	Montenegro	14	16	11	13	15	15	13	14	
05	Malta	15	15	3	14	5	12	16	15	
06	Norway	1	4	8	3	3	3	6	5	6
07	Portugal	11	9	13	10	12	13	14	13	
08	Czech Republic	3	2	7	7	6	4	2	3	8
09	Israel	7	1	2	4	4	2	3	2	10
10	Latvia	9	8	1	6	2	5	4	4	7
11	Azerbaijan	6	3	9	8	10	6	8	8	3
12	Iceland	10	10	10	9	7	9	11	9	2
13	Sweden	2	7	4	2	1	1	1	1	12
14	Switzerland	12	12	5	12	9	11	10	10	1
15	Cyprus	4	5	14	1	14	7	7	7	4
16	Slovenia	5	11	6	5	13	8	5	6	5
17	Poland									

Detailed voting results from Poland (Final)
R/O	Country	K. Szewczyk	M. Szabłowska	Donatan	T. Żąda	N. Szroeder	Jury Rank	Televote Rank	Combined Rank	Points
01	Slovenia	15	17	7	14	16	16	8	10	1
02	France	20	26	23	23	24	26	25	26	
03	Israel	11	5	3	8	4	4	7	7	4
04	Estonia	13	12	17	13	19	17	2	9	2
05	United Kingdom	5	4	18	9	9	8	22	17	
06	Armenia	21	24	22	24	22	24	20	24	
07	Lithuania	22	21	24	25	20	23	19	21	
08	Serbia	16	16	26	20	14	21	21	22	
09	Norway	10	7	6	4	6	5	12	8	3
10	Sweden	1	2	19	3	1	2	3	1	12
11	Cyprus	9	6	20	1	18	9	16	13	
12	Australia	2	3	8	2	3	1	9	3	8
13	Belgium	8	1	25	5	5	6	5	6	5
14	Austria	12	11	21	6	12	13	24	18	
15	Greece	23	19	10	22	17	20	23	23	
16	Montenegro	24	25	16	26	23	25	15	19	
17	Germany	14	10	9	19	13	14	10	11	
18	Poland									
19	Latvia	7	9	2	7	2	3	6	2	10
20	Romania	25	23	13	18	25	22	18	20	
21	Spain	17	22	15	21	15	19	11	16	
22	Hungary	6	15	14	15	10	11	14	12	
23	Georgia	18	14	5	16	7	12	17	15	
24	Azerbaijan	19	13	4	12	21	15	13	14	
25	Russia	4	20	1	11	8	7	4	5	6
26	Albania	26	18	12	17	11	18	26	25	
27	Italy	3	8	11	10	26	10	1	4	7
