= Zero In On =

Band

Zero In On is a band founded in 2000 in Locarno, a small town in the south of Switzerland. Zero In On had airplay on many European radio stations, particularly in Germany, Portugal and Belgium and on the Swiss national radio stations Rete Tre and Couleur3. Zero In On was nominated "Best Swiss Band" by the Zic Me Up Tour Contest in France.

Elias Bertini, the leader, started to compose rock songs with Mattia Stefanini, the drummer. The musical influences of the two of them gave a way to a very particular style, a mix of pop and metal, classical and experimental music. In 2004, after the publication of their first album, The Oblivion Fair, the band started to play with Gian-Andrea Costa, the bass player. The debut album come out in Germany, Belgium, Luxembourg, Austria, Portugal, Mexico and in the United States. They also release two singles, the first one including "Surrounding the Sea" and "To Mary" and the second one "Queen" and "Secrets in Glue". Zero In On had airplay on many European radio stations, particularly in Germany, Portugal and Belgium and on the Swiss national radio stations Rete Tre and Couleur3. Zero In On's success was accompanied by the release of the video clip of the song "Surrounding the Sea". In 2005, they also appeared in two compilations by Trock and by FNAC-CH. The French Label "Production Spéciales" ("Special Product") selected the band's cover of The Beatles song "While My Guitar Gently Weeps" for a compilation dedicated to Beatles. They played on Orgy festival, Sid'Action Festival, Watermelon Festival and, in the same year they walked, as the first Swiss-Italian band, on the FMR stage of Paléo Festival in Nyon (Switzerland). The second album Pillow Talk (2006) had airplay on Swiss and European radio stations. Zero In On presented the new songs also in Los Angeles, Brighton, Lyon and Paris. In 2008, the band was nominated "Best Swiss Band" by the Zic Me Up Tour Contest in France. In 2009, Zero In On recorded the 3rd album, Silly Lilly, which was introduced to Russian public in St-Petersburg in April 2010.
