= Spain in the Eurovision Song Contest 2015 =

- Eurovision Song Contest 2015
- Participating broadcaster: Radiotelevisión Española (RTVE)
- Country: Spain
- Selection process: Internal selection
- Announcement date: Artist: 14 January 2015; Song: 1 March 2015

Competing entry
- Song: "Amanecer"
- Artist: Edurne
- Songwriters: Tony Sánchez-Ohlsson; Peter Boström; Thomas G:son

Placement
- Final result: 21st, 15 points

Participation chronology

Spain was represented at the Eurovision Song Contest 2015 with the song "Amanecer", written by Tony Sánchez-Ohlsson, Peter Boström, and Thomas G:son, and performed by Edurne. The Spanish participating broadcaster, Radiotelevisión Española (RTVE), internally selected its entry for the contest. RTVE announced Edurne as its representative on 14 January 2015, while "Amanecer" was presented to the public on 1 March 2015.

As a member of the "Big Five", Spain automatically qualified to compete in the final of the Eurovision Song Contest. Performing in position 21, Spain placed twenty-first out of the 27 participating countries with 15 points.

== Background ==
Prior to the 2015 contest, Televisión Española (TVE) until 2006, and Radiotelevisión Española (RTVE) since 2007, had participated in the Eurovision Song Contest representing Spain fifty-four times since TVE's first entry in 1961. They have won the contest on two occasions: in 1968 with the song "La, la, la" performed by Massiel and in 1969 with the song "Vivo cantando" performed by Salomé, the latter having won in a four-way tie with France, the Netherlands, and the United Kingdom. They have also finished second four times, with "En un mundo nuevo" by Karina in 1971, "Eres tú" by Mocedades in 1973, "Su canción" by Betty Missiego in 1979, and "Vuelve conmigo" by Anabel Conde in 1995. In 2014, RTVE placed tenth with the song "Dancing in the Rain" performed by Ruth Lorenzo.

As part of its duties as participating broadcaster, RTVE organises the selection of its entry in the Eurovision Song Contest and broadcasts the event in the country. RTVE confirmed its intentions to participate at the 2015 contest on 15 September 2014. In 2014, RTVE organised a national final featuring a competition among several artists and songs to select both the artist and song. For its 2015 entry, the broadcaster opted to select both the artist and song via an internal selection.

== Before Eurovision ==
=== Internal selection ===
In December 2014, Spanish media reported that RTVE had selected singer Edurne to represent Spain in Vienna. Edurne previously participated in the fourth series of the reality television music competition Operación Triunfo where she placed sixth. Edurne also participated in the third season of reality television music competition Tu cara me suena where she was the winner. Other artists rumoured in the Spanish press included Diana Navarro, Marta Sánchez, and Pablo Alborán.

On 14 January 2015, the broadcaster held a press conference at the RTVE Torrespaña premises in Madrid, hosted by Ignacio Gómez-Acebo, where they confirmed Edurne as its entrant. During the press conference, it was also revealed that Edurne would sing the song "Amanecer", written by Tony Sánchez-Ohlsson, Peter Boström, and Thomas G:son. Sánchez-Ohlsson and G:son had previously co-written the Spanish entries in 2007 and 2012. The official video of "Amanecer", directed by David Arnal and Germán de la Hoz, was filmed in January 2015 in Valencia. The song premiered on 1 March 2015 on RTVE's website, while the video was released on 9 March 2015. The music video served as the official preview video for the Spanish entry.

=== Preparation ===
Edurne's pre-contest promotion for "Amanecer" was focused in Spain, including a performance of the song on the talk show Alaska y Segura on La 1 on 6 April. On 15 April, it was announced that "Amanecer" would be the official song of the 2015 Vuelta a España. On 22 April, a promotional symphonic version of "Amanecer" was released, which was recorded with the RTVE Symphony Orchestra and chorus at Madrid's Teatro Monumental.

== At Eurovision ==
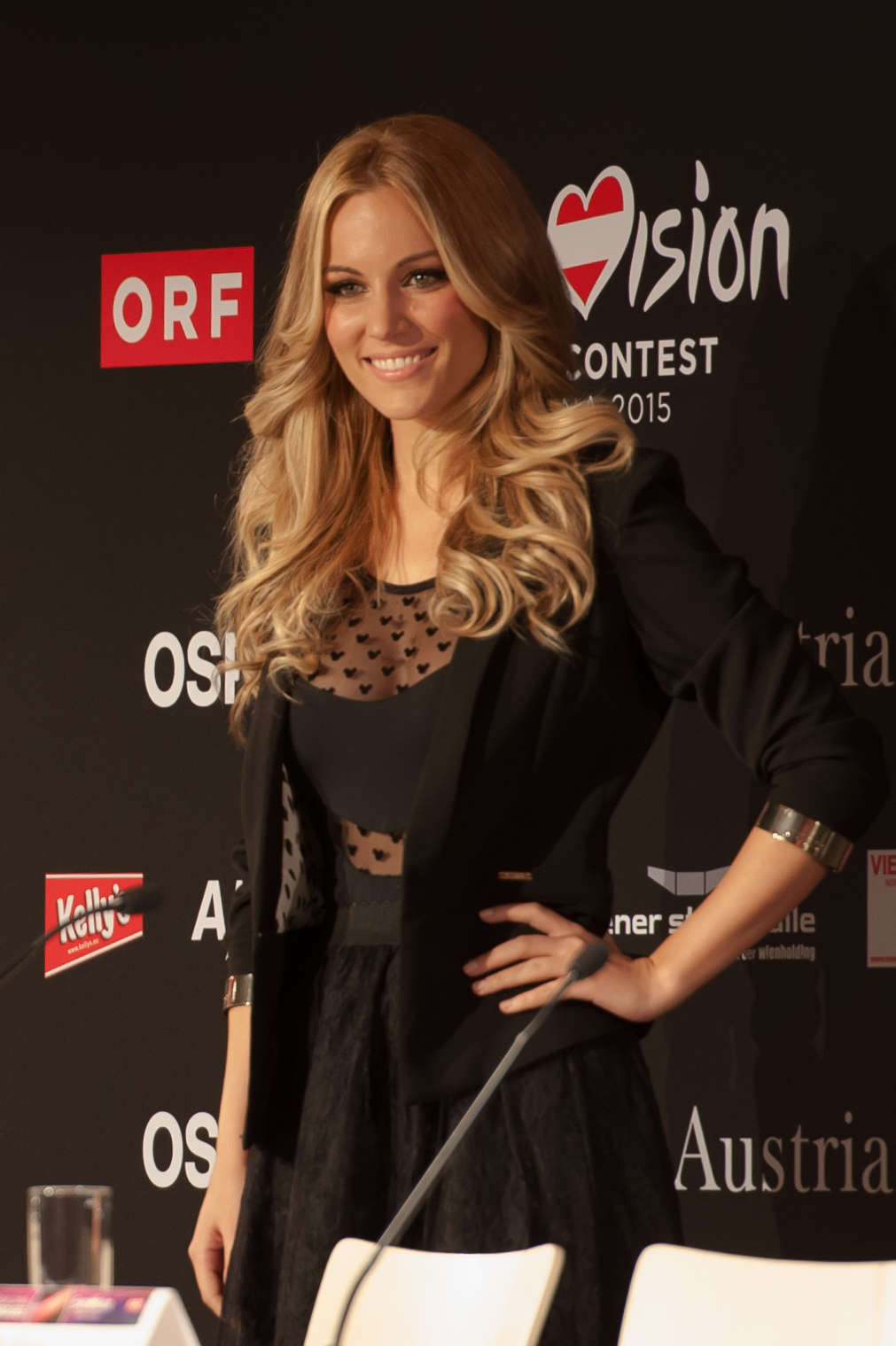
Edurne during a press meet and greet

According to Eurovision rules, all nations with the exceptions of the host country and the "Big Five" (France, Germany, Italy, Spain and the United Kingdom) are required to qualify from one of two semi-finals in order to compete for the final; the top ten countries from each semi-final progress to the final. In the 2015 contest, Australia also competed directly in the final as an invited guest nation. As a member of the "Big Five", Spain automatically qualified to compete in the final on 23 May 2015. In addition to their participation in the final, Spain is also required to broadcast and vote in one of the two semi-finals. During the semi-final allocation draw on 26 January 2015, Spain was assigned to broadcast and vote in the first semi-final on 19 May 2015.

In Spain, the semi-finals were broadcast on La 2 and the final was broadcast on La 1 with commentary by José María Íñigo and Julia Varela. RTVE appointed Lara Siscar as its spokesperson to announce during the final the Spanish votes.

=== Final ===
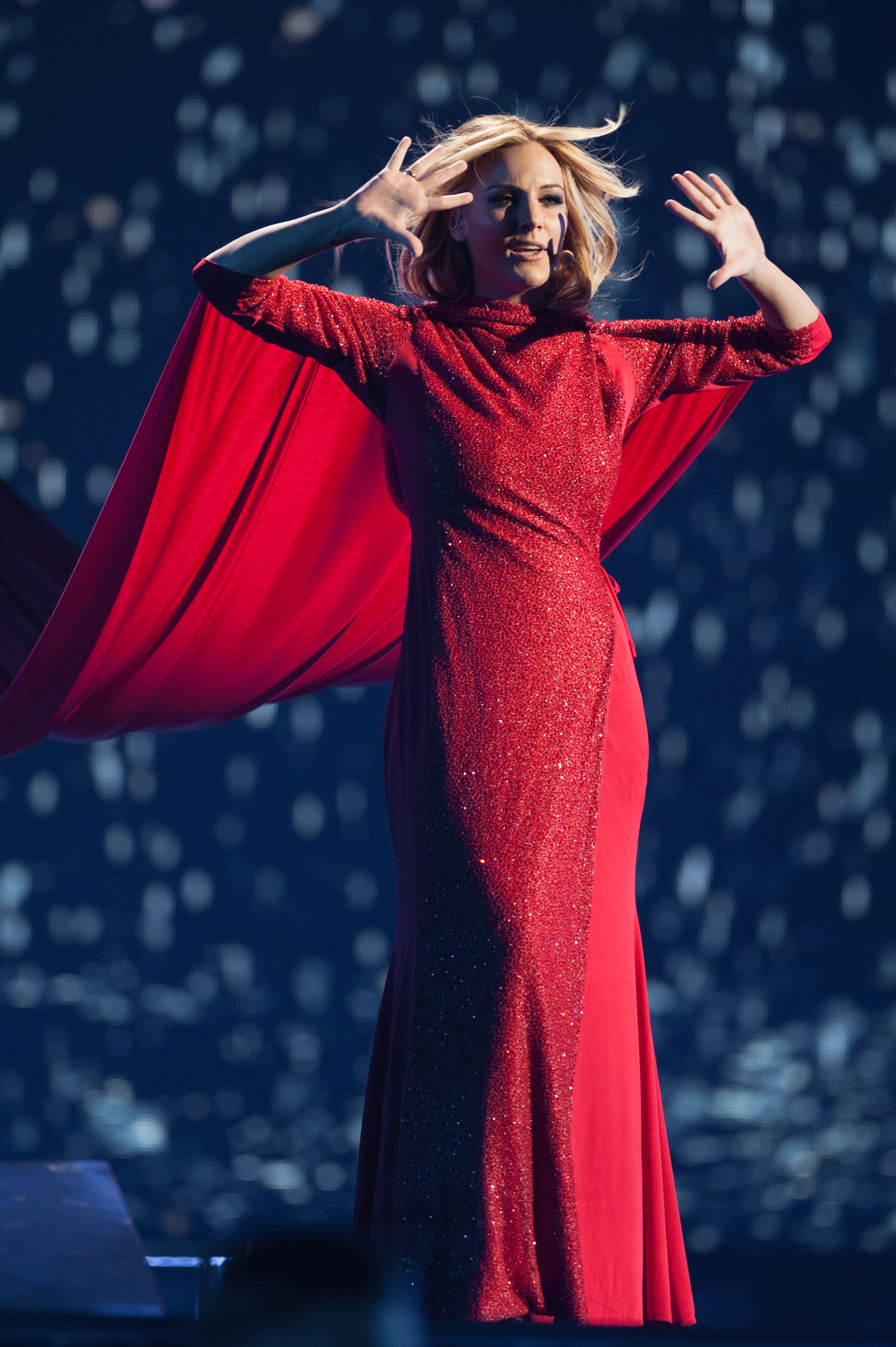
Edurne during a rehearsal before the final

Edurne took part in technical rehearsals on 17 and 20 May, followed by dress rehearsals on 22 and 23 May. This included the jury final on 22 May where the professional juries of each country watched and voted on the competing entries. After technical rehearsals were held on 20 May, the "Big 5" countries, host country Austria and guest country Australia held a press conference. As part of this press conference, the artists took part in a draw to determine which half of the grand final they would subsequently participate in. Spain was drawn to compete in the second half. Following the conclusion of the second semi-final, the shows' producers decided upon the running order of the final. The running order for the semi-finals and final was decided by the shows' producers rather than through another draw, so that similar songs were not placed next to each other. Spain was subsequently placed to perform in position 21, following the entry from Romania and before the entry from Hungary.

The Spanish performance featured Edurne on stage wearing a long red cloak which was removed to reveal a gold dress designed by José Fuentes, joined by dancer Giuseppe Di Bella. The performers did an acrobatic dance routine choreographed by Miryam Benedited Arce, which included Edurne beginning the performance by laying down on a pedestal at the centre of the stage and holding Di Bella in her arms. In regards to the performance, the head of the Spanish delegation Federico Llanos stated: "The moment captured by Edurne's song "Amanecer" is sunrise. Last minutes of a battle between the darkness and the light. She thinks about all the memories, fighting against all the bad things happened in her life. So, she struggles with her past, hoping to be able to continue with her life. It's all about the battle, right before the sunrise. That excitement is what the song and her performance is all about." The stage lighting transitioned from dark colours to bright yellow, and the LED screens displayed rain, waterfalls and arid landscapes. Spain placed twenty-first in the final, scoring 15 points.

=== Voting ===
Voting during the three shows consisted of 50 percent public televoting and 50 percent from a jury deliberation. The jury consisted of five music industry professionals who were citizens of the country they represent, with their names published before the contest to ensure transparency. This jury was asked to judge each contestant based on: vocal capacity; the stage performance; the song's composition and originality; and the overall impression by the act. In addition, no member of a national jury could be related in any way to any of the competing acts in such a way that they cannot vote impartially and independently. The individual rankings of each jury member were released shortly after the grand final.

Following the release of the full split voting by the EBU after the conclusion of the competition, it was revealed that Spain had placed twentieth with the public televote and twenty-fifth with the jury vote. In the public vote, Spain scored 27 points and in the jury vote the nation scored 6 points.

Below is a breakdown of points awarded to Spain and awarded by Spain in the first semi-final and grand final of the contest, and the breakdown of the jury voting and televoting conducted during the two shows:

==== Points awarded to Spain ====
Points awarded to Spain (Final)
Score	Country
12 points	
10 points	
8 points	
7 points	
6 points	
5 points	France
4 points	
3 points	Portugal
2 points	Montenegro
1 point	Azerbaijan; Israel; Moldova; Russia; Switzerland

==== Points awarded by Spain ====
Points awarded by Spain (Semi-final 1)
Score	Country
12 points	Estonia
10 points	Belgium
8 points	Romania
7 points	Russia
6 points	Albania
5 points	Georgia
4 points	Armenia
3 points	Netherlands
2 points	Greece
1 point	Denmark

Points awarded by Spain (Final)
Score	Country
12 points	Italy
10 points	Russia
8 points	Sweden
7 points	Australia
6 points	Belgium
5 points	Romania
4 points	Latvia
3 points	Estonia
2 points	Norway
1 point	Israel

==== Detailed voting results ====
The following members comprised the Spanish jury:

- Jacobo Calderón (jury chairperson) – songwriter, producer
- Daniel Diges – singer, actor, represented Spain in 2010
- Rosa López – singer, represented Spain in 2002
- Ruth Lorenzo – singer, represented Spain in 2014
- Pastora Soler – singer, represented Spain in 2012

Detailed voting results from Spain (Semi-final 1)
R/O	Country	J. Calderón	D. Diges	R. López	R. Lorenzo	P. Soler	Jury Rank	Televote Rank	Combined Rank	Points
01	Moldova	8	14	15	16	14	15	9	12	
02	Armenia	12	13	11	15	13	12	4	7	4
03	Belgium	5	6	2	2	3	2	3	2	10
04	Netherlands	10	7	14	13	9	10	8	8	3
05	Finland	16	15	12	14	16	16	11	15	
06	Greece	2	2	3	9	5	4	14	9	2
07	Estonia	7	5	4	3	2	3	2	1	12
08	Macedonia	14	16	10	10	15	13	16	16	
09	Serbia	11	11	13	12	10	11	10	11	
10	Hungary	15	12	16	11	12	14	12	14	
11	Belarus	13	9	5	8	11	9	15	13	
12	Russia	1	1	1	1	1	1	7	4	7
13	Denmark	6	3	9	7	8	7	13	10	1
14	Albania	4	4	8	6	4	5	5	5	6
15	Romania	3	10	7	4	6	6	1	3	8
16	Georgia	9	8	6	5	7	8	6	6	5

Detailed voting results from Spain (Final)
R/O	Country	J. Calderón	D. Diges	R. López	R. Lorenzo	P. Soler	Jury Rank	Televote Rank	Combined Rank	Points
01	Slovenia	10	12	15	16	17	13	21	17	
02	France	9	11	16	11	11	10	19	13	
03	Israel	18	9	14	18	13	15	7	10	1
04	Estonia	16	14	9	8	4	8	10	8	3
05	United Kingdom	24	24	25	22	23	25	11	19	
06	Armenia	23	23	17	26	24	23	12	18	
07	Lithuania	17	8	18	23	22	20	14	16	
08	Serbia	25	22	24	25	19	24	16	23	
09	Norway	13	10	6	7	9	7	13	9	2
10	Sweden	11	6	3	4	3	5	3	3	8
11	Cyprus	7	19	7	15	18	11	18	12	
12	Australia	6	4	4	3	7	4	4	4	7
13	Belgium	2	7	1	1	5	2	6	5	6
14	Austria	12	3	12	9	16	9	23	14	
15	Greece	14	5	23	20	10	14	25	22	
16	Montenegro	21	18	21	21	25	22	24	25	
17	Germany	15	16	19	19	20	21	17	21	
18	Poland	20	17	8	12	21	18	15	15	
19	Latvia	3	13	5	6	8	6	9	7	4
20	Romania	5	21	13	14	15	12	2	6	5
21	Spain									
22	Hungary	26	25	26	24	26	26	22	26	
23	Georgia	19	15	20	17	14	19	8	11	
24	Azerbaijan	22	26	11	10	6	16	26	24	
25	Russia	1	2	2	2	1	1	5	2	10
26	Albania	8	20	22	13	12	17	20	20	
27	Italy	4	1	10	5	2	3	1	1	12
