= Armenia in the Eurovision Song Contest 2015 =

- Eurovision Song Contest 2015
- Participating broadcaster: Public Television of Armenia (AMPTV)
- Country: Armenia
- Selection process: Internal selection
- Announcement date: Artist: 11 February 2015; Song: 12 March 2015

Competing entry
- Song: "Face the Shadow"
- Artist: Genealogy
- Songwriters: Armen Matirosyan; Inna Mkrtchyan

Placement
- Semi-final result: Qualified (7th, 77 points)
- Final result: 16th, 34 points

Participation chronology

Armenia was represented at the Eurovision Song Contest 2015 with the song "Face the Shadow" written by Armen Matirosyan and Inna Mkrtchyan. The song was performed by the group Genealogy, which was selected internally by the Armenian broadcaster Public Television of Armenia (AMPTV) to represent Armenia in the 2015 contest in Vienna, Austria. Among the members of the group included Inga Arshakyan who had previously represented Armenia in the Eurovision Song Contest in 2009. Genealogy and the song "Don't Deny" were announced as the Armenian entry on 11 February 2015, while the song, retitled as "Face the Shadow", was later presented to the public on 12 March 2015.

Armenia was drawn to compete in the first semi-final of the Eurovision Song Contest which took place on 19 May 2015. Performing during the show in position 2, "Face the Shadow" was announced among the top 10 entries of the first semi-final and therefore qualified to compete in the final on 23 May. It was later revealed that Armenia placed seventh out of the 16 participating countries in the semi-final with 77 points. In the final, Armenia performed in position 6 and placed sixteenth out of the 27 participating countries with 34 points.

== Background ==
Prior to the 2015 contest, Armenia had participated in the Eurovision Song Contest eight times since its first entry in 2006. Its highest placing in the contest, to this point, has been fourth place, which the nation achieved on two occasions: in 2008 with the song "Qélé, Qélé" performed by Sirusho and in 2014 with the song "Not Alone" performed by Aram Mp3. Armenia had, to this point, failed to qualify to the final on only one occasion in 2011. The nation briefly withdrew from the contest in 2012 due to long-standing tensions with then host country Azerbaijan.

The Armenian national broadcaster, Public Television of Armenia (AMPTV), broadcasts the event within Armenia and organises the selection process for the nation's entry. AMPTV confirmed their intentions to participate at the 2015 Eurovision Song Contest on 14 September 2014. Armenia has used various methods to select the Armenian entry in the past, such as a live televised national final to choose the performer, song or both to compete at Eurovision. However internal selections have also been held on occasion. In 2014, the broadcaster internally selected both the artist and the song, a procedure that had only been used once before to select Armenia's debut entry in 2006. The broadcaster also opted to internally select the 2015 Armenian entry.

== Before Eurovision ==
=== Internal selection ===
The Armenian entry for the Eurovision Song Contest 2015 was internally selected by the AMPTV. On 11 February 2015, the group Genealogy was announced as the Armenian representative with the song "Don't Deny", composed by Armen Matirosyan with lyrics by Inna Mkrtchyan. Genealogy consisted of five singers from the Armenian diaspora in Europe, Asia, Africa, America and Australia that symbolize the five petals of the forget-me-not flower, and was unified by their sixth member from Armenia, in their centre. The six members of the group were revealed between 16 February and 12 March 2015 and consisted of:

- Essaï Altounian (Europe) – French Armenian singer
- Tamar Kaprelian (America) – American Armenian singer
- Vahe Tilbian (Africa) – Ethiopian Armenian singer
- Stephanie Topalian (Asia) – U.S. born Armenian-American-Japanese singer residing in Japan
- Mary-Jean O'Doherty (Australia) – Australian opera singer of Armenian descent
- Inga Arshakyan (Armenia) – Armenian singer, previously represented Armenia in the Eurovision Song Contest 2009 together with her sister Anush

"Don't Deny" was presented to the public together with the official video on 12 March 2015. In regards to the song, AMPTV stated: "Happiness is born when people are united and live in harmony with themselves, their families, love relationships and so on. Generations are shifting with time but the genealogy remains, thus the values of love and peace are stable." Genealogy filmed the official video for the song prior to the presentation, which was directed by Aren Bayadyan and featured fashion designs by Armen Galyan. The song was later retitled as "Face the Shadow" due to speculations that the song was written to commemorate the centenary of the Armenian genocide.

== At Eurovision ==
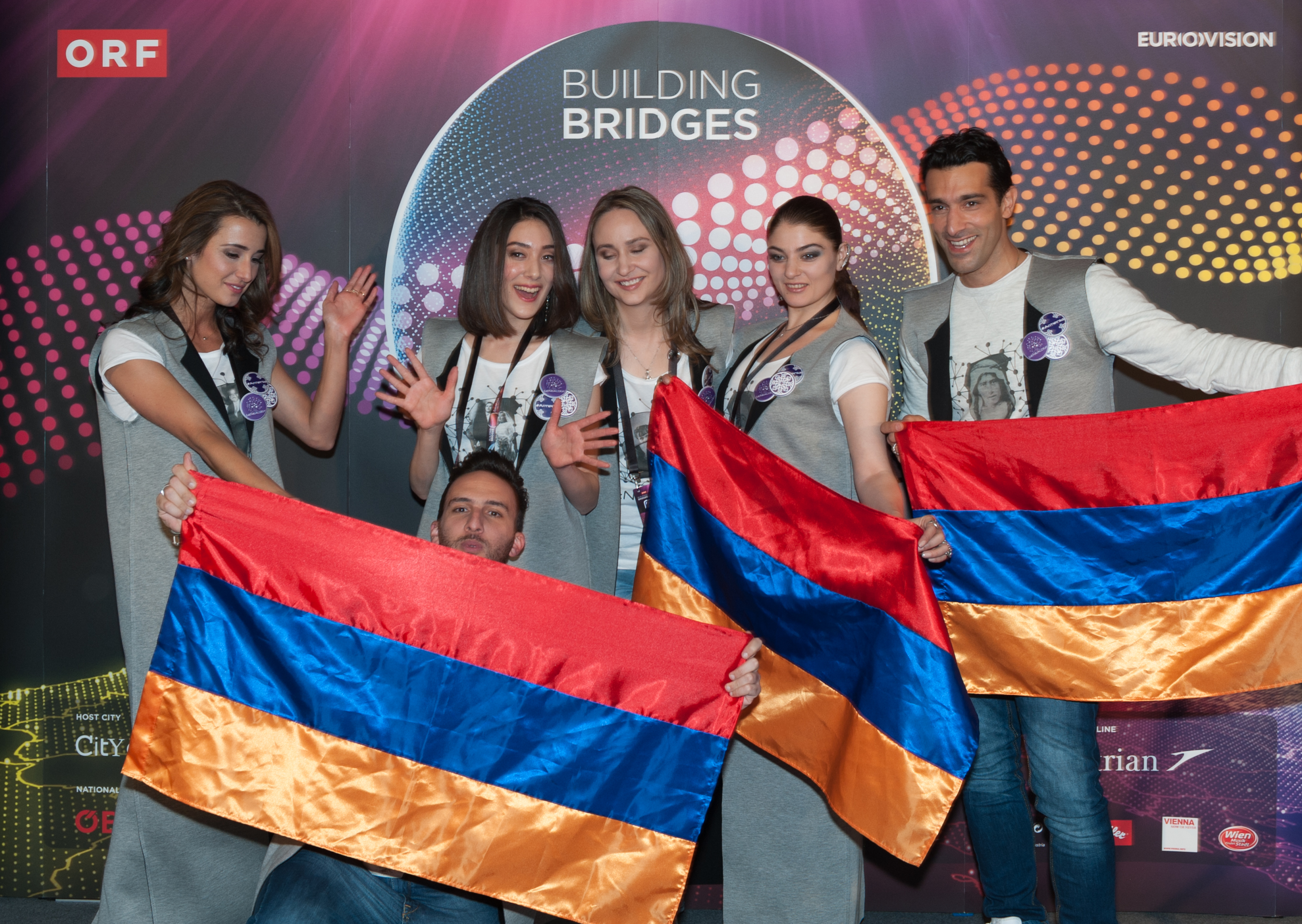
Genealogy during a press meet and greet

According to Eurovision rules, all nations with the exceptions of the host country and the "Big Five" (France, Germany, Italy, Spain and the United Kingdom) are required to qualify from one of two semi-finals in order to compete for the final; the top ten countries from each semi-final progress to the final. In the 2015 contest, Australia also competed directly in the final as an invited guest nation. The European Broadcasting Union (EBU) split up the competing countries into five different pots based on voting patterns from previous contests, with countries with favourable voting histories put into the same pot. On 26 January 2015, a special allocation draw was held which placed each country into one of the two semi-finals, as well as which half of the show they would perform in. Armenia was placed into the first semi-final, to be held on 19 May 2015, and was scheduled to perform in the first half of the show.

Once all the competing songs for the 2015 contest had been released, the running order for the semi-finals was decided by the shows' producers rather than through another draw, so that similar songs were not placed next to each other. Armenia was set to perform in position 2, following the entry from Moldova and before the entry from Belgium.

In Armenia, the two semi-finals and the final were broadcast on Armenia 1 with commentary by Aram Mp3 and Erik Antaranyan in the first semi-final, Vahe Khanamiryan and Hermine Stepanyan in the second semi-final, and Avet Barseghyan and Arevik Udumyan in the final. The Armenian spokesperson, who announced the Armenian votes during the final, was Lilit Muradyan.

=== Semi-final ===
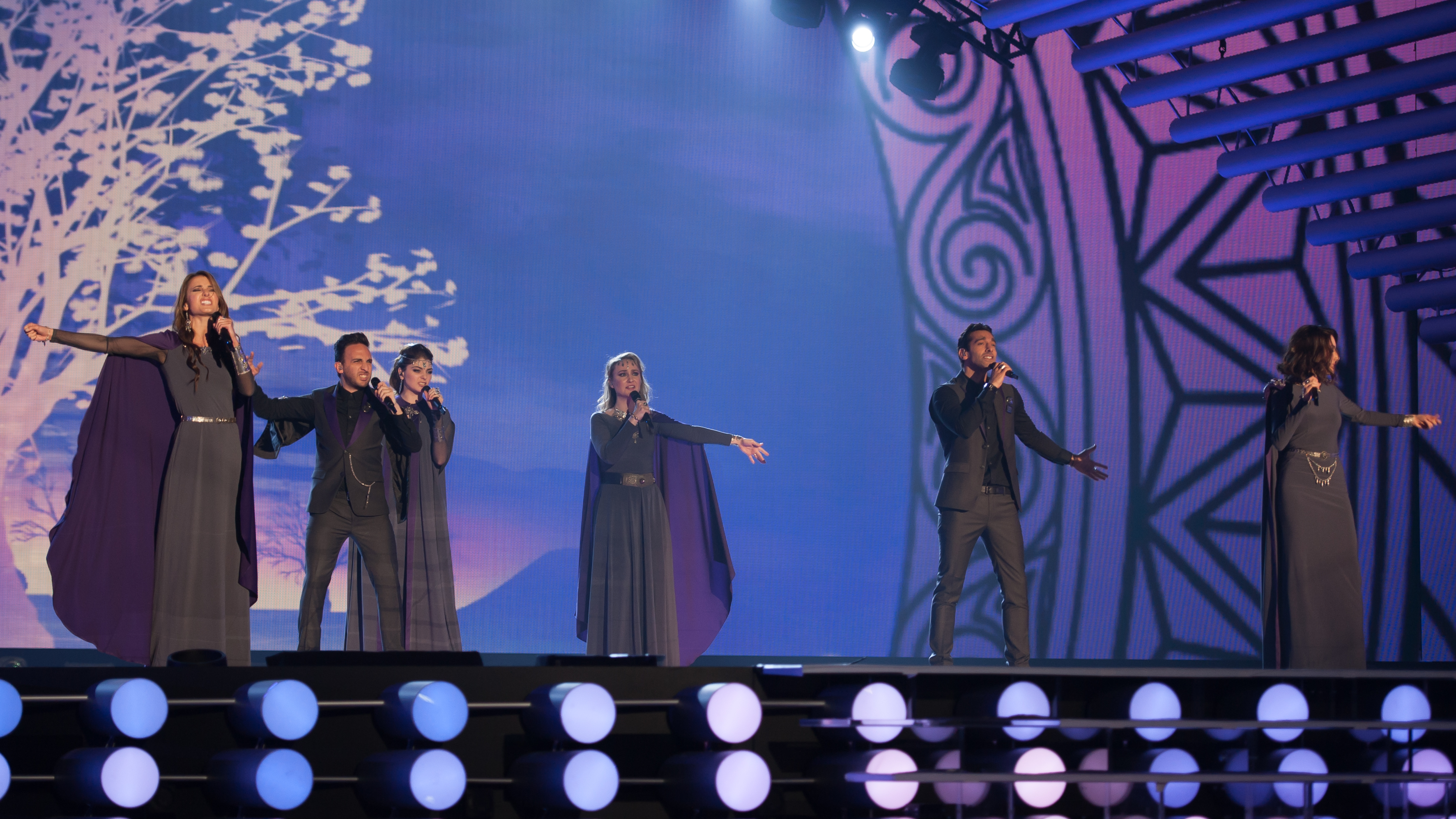
Genealogy during a rehearsal before the first semi-final

Genealogy took part in technical rehearsals on 11 and 15 May, followed by dress rehearsals on 18 and 19 May. This included the jury final on 18 May where the professional juries of each country watched and voted on the competing entries.

The Armenian performance featured the members of Genealogy dressed in black outfits with traditional jewellery and purple elements. The stage presentation began with the group members standing separated on stage with only the respective artist currently singing showing movements. The group members then got close to each other in a circle and completed the performance by walking to the front of the stage in a line and raising their hands, during which pyrotechnic flame effects and a wind machine were also used. The LED screens projected trees and ornaments with the stage lighting displaying purple and pink colours.

At the end of the show, Armenia was announced as having finished in the top 10 and subsequently qualifying for the grand final. It was later revealed that Armenia placed seventh in the semi-final, receiving a total of 77 points.

=== Final ===
Shortly after the first semi-final, a winner's press conference was held for the ten qualifying countries. As part of this press conference, the qualifying artists took part in a draw to determine which half of the grand final they would subsequently participate in. This draw was done in the order the countries were announced during the semi-final. Armenia was drawn to compete in the first half. Following this draw, the shows' producers decided upon the running order of the final, as they had done for the semi-finals. Armenia was subsequently placed to perform in position 6, following the entry from United Kingdom and before the entry from Lithuania.

Genealogy once again took part in dress rehearsals on 22 and 23 May before the final, including the jury final where the professional juries cast their final votes before the live show. The group performed a repeat of their semi-final performance during the final on 23 May. Armenia placed sixteenth in the final, scoring 34 points.

=== Voting ===
Voting during the three shows consisted of 50 percent public televoting and 50 percent from a jury deliberation. The jury consisted of five music industry professionals who were citizens of the country they represent, with their names published before the contest to ensure transparency. This jury was asked to judge each contestant based on: vocal capacity; the stage performance; the song's composition and originality; and the overall impression by the act. In addition, no member of a national jury could be related in any way to any of the competing acts in such a way that they cannot vote impartially and independently. The individual rankings of each jury member were released shortly after the grand final.

Following the release of the full split voting by the EBU after the conclusion of the competition, it was revealed that Armenia had placed eleventh with the public televote and twenty-fourth with the jury vote in the final. In the public vote, Armenia scored 75 points, while with the jury vote, Armenia scored 18 points. In the first semi-final, Armenia placed sixth with the public televote with 90 points and twelfth with the jury vote, scoring 54 points.

Below is a breakdown of points awarded to Armenia and awarded by Armenia in the first semi-final and grand final of the contest, and the breakdown of the jury voting and televoting conducted during the two shows:

==== Points awarded to Armenia ====
Points awarded to Armenia (Semi-final 1)
Score	Country
12 points	Belgium; Russia
10 points	
8 points	Georgia
7 points	Belarus; Greece; Macedonia
6 points	
5 points	Albania; France; Netherlands
4 points	Moldova; Spain
3 points	
2 points	
1 point	Romania

Points awarded to Armenia (Final)
Score	Country
12 points	Georgia
10 points	
8 points	
7 points	
6 points	Russia
5 points	
4 points	Belarus
3 points	Belgium; France; Macedonia
2 points	Czech Republic
1 point	Greece

==== Points awarded by Armenia ====
Points awarded by Armenia (Semi-final 1)
Score	Country
12 points	Georgia
10 points	Russia
8 points	Greece
7 points	Belarus
6 points	Moldova
5 points	Serbia
4 points	Estonia
3 points	Romania
2 points	Denmark
1 point	Belgium

Points awarded by Armenia (Final)
Score	Country
12 points	Russia
10 points	Georgia
8 points	Montenegro
7 points	Sweden
6 points	Italy
5 points	Greece
4 points	Belgium
3 points	France
2 points	Latvia
1 point	Australia

==== Detailed voting results ====
The following members comprised the Armenian jury:

- Grigor Nazaryan (jury chairperson) – producer, music producer
- Nune Yesayan – singer
- Leyla Saribekyan – singer, composer
- Aram Sargsyan (Aram Mp3) – singer, songwriter, comedian and showman, represented Armenia in the 2014 contest
- Aren Bayadyan – director

Detailed voting results from Armenia (Semi-final 1)
R/O	Country	G. Nazaryan	N. Yesayan	L. Saribekyan	Aram Mp3	A. Bayadyan	Jury Rank	Televote Rank	Combined Rank	Points
01	Moldova	5	6	7	6	7	5	6	5	6
02	Armenia									
03	Belgium	13	15	15	12	15	15	5	10	1
04	Netherlands	6	9	13	4	11	8	12	11	
05	Finland	8	10	14	11	12	12	10	12	
06	Greece	3	3	3	2	3	3	3	3	8
07	Estonia	12	14	12	13	13	13	4	7	4
08	Macedonia	10	8	10	10	10	11	15	14	
09	Serbia	9	7	8	9	5	6	7	6	5
10	Hungary	15	13	11	14	14	14	14	15	
11	Belarus	2	2	2	3	2	2	8	4	7
12	Russia	4	4	1	5	4	4	1	2	10
13	Denmark	7	12	6	15	8	10	9	9	2
14	Albania	14	11	9	7	6	9	13	13	
15	Romania	11	5	5	8	9	7	11	8	3
16	Georgia	1	1	4	1	1	1	2	1	12

Detailed voting results from Armenia (Final)
R/O	Country	G. Nazaryan	N. Yesayan	L. Saribekyan	Aram Mp3	A. Bayadyan	Jury Rank	Televote Rank	Combined Rank	Points
01	Slovenia	19	17	15	15	7	14	19	17	
02	France	7	5	7	11	20	8	8	8	3
03	Israel	20	18	25	25	25	25	9	18	
04	Estonia	21	20	24	24	9	20	6	11	
05	United Kingdom	22	21	20	20	21	22	22	24	
06	Armenia									
07	Lithuania	23	22	19	17	11	18	25	22	
08	Serbia	18	23	14	18	19	19	14	16	
09	Norway	17	19	21	19	24	21	15	19	
10	Sweden	6	7	3	6	6	6	4	4	7
11	Cyprus	10	6	11	14	18	11	17	13	
12	Australia	12	10	8	12	12	10	11	10	1
13	Belgium	8	16	10	5	10	7	7	7	4
14	Austria	16	25	12	8	17	15	24	21	
15	Greece	3	2	4	3	5	2	10	6	5
16	Montenegro	4	3	5	4	4	4	3	3	8
17	Germany	15	24	17	16	13	17	20	20	
18	Poland	11	8	16	10	16	12	18	15	
19	Latvia	2	9	6	1	3	5	13	9	2
20	Romania	13	15	9	13	14	13	16	14	
21	Spain	14	14	18	21	15	16	12	12	
22	Hungary	24	13	22	22	23	24	23	25	
23	Georgia	1	1	2	2	1	1	5	2	10
24	Azerbaijan	26	26	26	26	26	26	26	26	
25	Russia	5	4	1	7	2	3	1	1	12
26	Albania	25	11	23	23	22	23	21	23	
27	Italy	9	12	13	9	8	9	2	5	6
