= Tamar Kaprelian =

Armenian-American singer

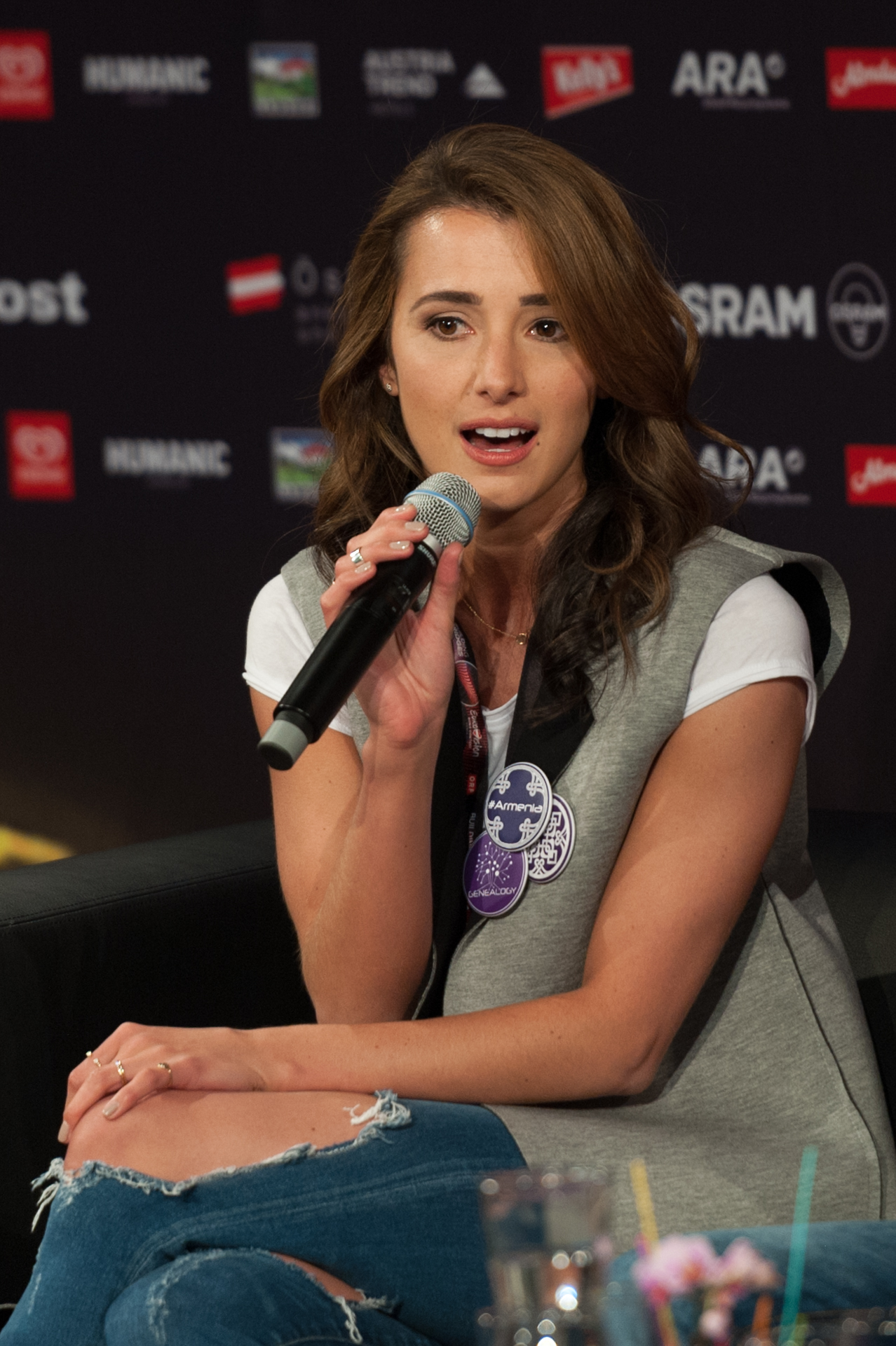
- Kaprelian in 2015
- Born: Tamar Mardirossian; October 28, 1986 (age 39); Scottsdale, Arizona, U.S.
- Citizenship: United States; Armenia
- Education: Columbia University
- Occupations: Singer; songwriter; philanthropist
- Spouse: Chris Stang (m. 2016)
- Musical career
- Genres: Pop; pop rock; world
- Instruments: Vocals; piano
- Years active: 2008–present
- Labels: Interscope; Killer Tracks
- Website: www.tamarkaprelian.com

Tamar Mardirossian (Armenian: Թամար Մարտիրոսեան; born October 28, 1986), known professionally as Tamar Kaprelian, is an American-Armenian singer, songwriter, and philanthropist. Kaprelian began her career in 2008, after winning a cover contest organized by OneRepublic, performing "Apologize". Following her win, Ryan Tedder introduced her to Interscope Records executives, and she was signed to the label. She went on to release her debut studio album Sinner or a Saint in 2010 through Interscope.

In 2015, Kaprelian was recruited by Public Television of Armenia (ARMTV) to represent Armenia in the Eurovision Song Contest 2015 as part of the group Genealogy with the song "Face the Shadow", placing sixteenth. She later attempted to represent Armenia in the Eurovision Song Contest 2018 as a solo artist, competing in the Armenian national selection Depi Evratesil 2018 with the song "Poison (Ari Ari)", but was eliminated in the semi-final.

Outside of music, Kaprelian has also founded the Nvak Foundation, an organization dedicated to the development of young Armenian singers, songwriters, and musicians.

== Early life ==
Kaprelian was born as Tamar Mardirossian in Scottsdale, Arizona to Avedis and Silva Mardirossian (née Kaprelian). Her parents are both of Armenian descent, and immigrated to the United States from the United Kingdom. Her great-grandparents were from Western Armenia. She later grew up in the states of Georgia and California, and was raised within the Armenian Apostolic Church.

== Career ==
=== 2008–2014: Career beginnings and Sinner or a Saint ===
Kaprelian first began her career in 2008, after winning the "Apologize" cover contest organized by OneRepublic. Following her win, she was signed to Interscope Records through the assistance of Ryan Tedder. In 2009, she released her debut single "New Day", which peaked at number-37 on the Adult Top 40. Her debut studio album, Sinner or a Saint, was released the following year through Interscope, and was produced by Wax Ltd. She released her debut extended play California in June 2012.

=== 2015–present: Eurovision attempts and career in Armenia ===
In 2015, Kaprelian was selected by the Armenian broadcaster Public Television of Armenia (ARMTV) to become the American representative in the Armenian supergroup Genealogy, along with French-Armenian singer Essaï Altounian, Ethiopian-Armenian singer Vahe Tilbian, Japanese-Armenian singer Stephanie Topalian, Australian-Armenian singer Mary-Jean O'Doherty Basmadjian, and Armenian singer Inga Arshakyan. The group performed their song "Face the Shadow" during the first semi-final of the Eurovision Song Contest 2015 in Vienna, and qualified to the final. They later went on to place sixteenth in the final, and disbanded shortly after the contest. After the contest, Kaprelian released the single "The Otherside", which featured guest vocals from Elhaida Dani, Elina Born, Maria-Elena Kyriakou, and Topalian, all of whom also competed in the Eurovision Song Contest 2015.

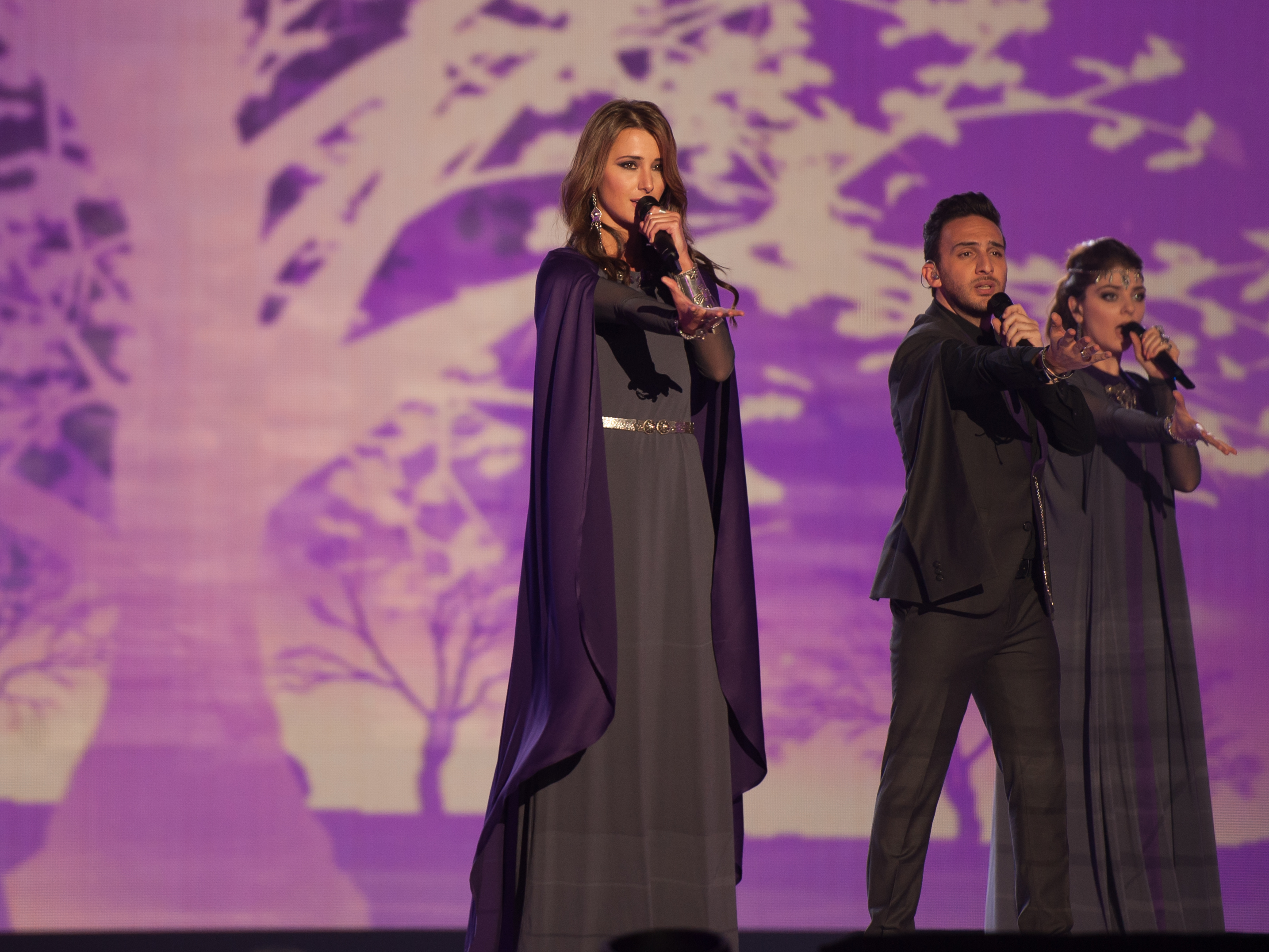
Kaprelian performing with Genealogy in Vienna.

In February 2017, Kaprelian released a cover of the Armenian folk song "Sareri hovin mernem" with Armenian social entrepreneur and occasional singer Larisa Hovannisian. The song was produced by DerHova and Ben Moody. She later released a cover of another Armenian folk song, "Noubari boye", in October 2017.

In 2018, Kaprelian announced her participation in Depi Evratesil 2018, the Armenian national selection for the Eurovision Song Contest 2018 with the song "Poison (Ari Ari)". The song is written by Kaprelian, DerHova, Sebu Simonian, and students from her organization the Nvak Foundation. The artistic stage presentation will be organized by Arthur Gurunlian. The song was released on January 15, 2018. She competed in the first semi-final on February 19, 2018, but did not advance to the final.

She co-wrote Rosa Linn's song "Snap" which represented Armenia in the Eurovision Song Contest 2022, where it finished in 20th place. "Snap" went viral on TikTok after the contest and entered numerous countries' national charts.

=== Philanthropy ===
In 2016, Kaprelian launched the Nvak Foundation, an organization based in Yerevan that is dedicated to fostering musical talent in young Armenian singers, songwriters, and musicians. The organization planned on expanding to Jerusalem in September 2018.

== Personal life ==
Kaprelian became a citizen of Armenia on 28 April 2015 after being given an Armenian passport by President Serzh Sargsyan. In May 2016, she graduated Phi Beta Kappa from Columbia University with a degree in English literature. Kaprelian married American entrepreneur Chris Stang in Normandy in October 2016.

== Discography ==
=== Studio albums ===
Title	Album details
Sinner or a Saint	Released: August 24, 2010; Label: Interscope Records; Formats: CD, digital download, streaming

=== EPs ===
Title	Album details
California	Released: July 19, 2012; Label: Killer Tracks; Formats: Digital download, streaming
Yours to Keep	Released: May 19, 2015; Label: Killer Tracks; Formats: Digital download, streaming

=== Singles ===
Title	Year	Peak chart positions	Album
Title	Year	US Adult Top 40	Album
"New Day"	2009	37	Sinner or a Saint
"The Otherside" (featuring Elhaida Dani, Elina Born, Maria-Elena Kyriakou & Stephanie Topalian)	2015	—	Non-album singles
"Sareri hovin mernem" (with Larisa Hovannisian)	2017	—	Non-album singles
"Noubari boye"	2017	—	Non-album singles
"Poison (Ari Ari)"	2018	—	Non-album singles
"—" denotes items which were not released in that country or failed to chart.

== Awards and nominations ==
Year	Award	Category	City	Result
2016	Pan-Armenian Entertainment Awards	Best female singer of Armenian diaspora	LA	Won

Awards and achievements
Preceded by Aram Mp3 with Not Alone	Armenia in the Eurovision Song Contest (as part of Genealogy); 2015	Succeeded by Iveta Mukuchyan with LoveWave
