= Armenia–Azerbaijan relations in the Eurovision Song Contest =

Armenia–Azerbaijan Eurovision Song Contest relations

- Armenia: Azerbaijan

The Public Television Company of Armenia (AMPTV) has represented Armenia in the Eurovision Song Contest since 2006, while İctimai Television (İTV) has represented Azerbaijan since 2008. The conflict between the two countries over the region of Nagorno-Karabakh, which is considered a de jure part of Azerbaijan by the United Nations, but had been wholly or partially under control of the Armenia-backed de facto Republic of Artsakh between 1993 and 2023, has affected their participation in the contest on several occasions.

Conflicts between Armenia and Azerbaijan first appeared in 2006, when Azerbaijani media criticised the event's website for listing Nagorno-Karabakh as the birthplace of Armenia's first representative, André, as it was part of the Azerbaijan SSR at the time. Conflicts notably escalated throughout the 2009 contest: during the semi-finals, İTV objected to the depiction of the Nagorno-Karabakh monument We Are Our Mountains during the introductory video for the Armenian entry. AMPTV responded during the final by displaying multiple images of the monument whilst presenting the Armenian voting. Following the contest, reports emerged that İTV had tampered with its feed of the broadcast to censor the Armenian entry, and that the Azerbaijani government was interrogating citizens who voted for Armenia, accusing them of being unpatriotic and a threat to security. Following an inquiry, İTV was fined by the European Broadcasting Union (EBU) for breaching the privacy of voters.

Following the Junior Eurovision Song Contest 2010, Armenian media claimed that the İTV broadcast of the contest was cut off when it became apparent that Armenia had won; however, it was disputed whether the contest was even broadcast in Azerbaijan as the broadcaster had not yet participated. Accordingly, as İTV prepared to host the Eurovision Song Contest 2012 following its win in 2011, a group of Armenian musicians led a boycott effort, and AMPTV would ultimately withdraw from the contest due to security concerns, causing it to be fined for the late notice.

Conflicts between the two countries emerged again during the lead-up to the 2015 contest, when allegations emerged that the Armenian entry, "Don't Deny", was a call for recognition of the Armenian genocide (whose centenary was commemorated prior to the contest). As Azerbaijan denies the genocide, officials from the country issued a statement threatening Armenia for attempting to use the contest as an outlet for its "political ambitions". The song was subsequently retitled "Face the Shadow" to address concerns over its alleged political themes. The following year, the Armenian representative Iveta Mukuchyan was reprimanded for displaying the Artsakh flag during the first semi-final.

== Initial appearances ==
In the Eurovision Song Contest 2006—the first contest in which the Public Television Company of Armenia (AMPTV) participated representing Armenia, the official Eurovision website listed the birthplace of its performer André as being in the "Republic of Nagorno-Karabakh". Media outlets in Azerbaijan criticized the contest's organizers for recognizing the republic, especially given that the region was an autonomous oblast within the Azerbaijan SSR when André was born in 1979. The birthplace listing on André's profile was later removed entirely.

İctimai Television (İTV) later made its Eurovision debut representing Azerbaijan in 2008—marking the first time both Armenia and Azerbaijan competed against each other at the contest. The Armenian entry, "Qélé, Qélé" by Sirusho, finished in fourth place, while Azerbaijan's inaugural entry, "Day After Day" by Elnur and Samir, finished in eighth place. Additionally, they both competed in the first semi-final of the contest, with Armenia awarding 2 points to Azerbaijan in the semi-final.

== 2009 contest ==
=== Armenian postcard controversy and aftermath ===
AMPTV displayed images of We Are Our Mountains while its spokesperson Sirusho presented the Armenian votes at the 2009 contest final, in protest of complaints by İTV over its display during the semi-finals.

During the first semi-final of the 2009 contest, the "postcard" video introducing the performance of the Armenian entry, "Jan Jan" by Inga and Anush, depicted, amongst other monuments, We Are Our Mountains, an art piece located in Nagorno-Karabakh's capital city of Stepanakert. Due to the country's claims over the region, İTV objected to the portrayal of We Are Our Mountains as being an Armenian landmark. For the broadcast of the final, the video was edited to remove the statue.

In protest of the decision, AMPTV displayed multiple photographs of We Are Our Mountains during the presentation of voting results from Armenia; one was displayed on a video screen at Yerevan's Republic Square in the background, and another was displayed on the back of a clipboard that its spokesperson Sirusho was reading results from. Despite the controversy, 1,065 Armenians voted for the Azerbaijani entry, and Armenia awarded Azerbaijan one point. A total of 43 Azerbaijanis voted for the Armenian entry.

=== Censorship, interrogation of voters in Azerbaijan ===
Following the contest, reports surfaced that İTV had attempted to censor the Armenian performance from its broadcast of the final, and had obscured the voting number for the entry in an effort to discourage voting for it. İTV denied these claims, and provided footage showing that its broadcast was untampered with. In August 2009, a number of Azerbaijanis who had voted for Armenia's entry during the contest were summoned for questioning at the Ministry of National Security in Baku, during which they were accused of being "unpatriotic" and "a potential security threat". One of those summoned, Rovshan Nasirli (who had voted for "Jan Jan" because he felt it was a better reflection of Azerbaijani music than "Always", the country's actual entry) said that his interrogators told him that they had the names and addresses of all 43 Azerbaijanis who had voted for Armenia.

Following these reports, Svante Stockselius, then-Executive Supervisor of the Eurovision Song Contest, announced the launch of an enquiry into the incidents. In their response, İTV stated that while two individuals had been invited to the Ministry of National Security, the Ministry had given assurances that nobody had been questioned, either officially or unofficially, on voting in the competition itself. The EBU's then-Director General Jean Réveillon responded to this by saying that freedom to vote is one of the cornerstones of the contest and that "any breach of privacy regarding voting, or interrogation of individuals, is totally unacceptable". Azerbaijani Minister of Youth and Sport, Azad Rahimov, denied that anyone had been summoned to the Ministry of National Security about voting for the Armenian entry, and accused RFE/RL and other news outlets of reporting the allegations to create a scandal.

The Eurovision Song Contest Reference Group examined the matter at a meeting in Oslo on 11 September 2009. In a statement issued on 17 September, the EBU acknowledged the allegations that Azerbaijani officials were interrogating voters and breaching their privacy. While the EBU would not impose sanctions on or ban İTV from future editions of the contest (it could have been banned from the contest for three years), it fined the broadcaster €2,700, and changed its rules to make participating broadcasters liable for the "disclosure of information which could be used to identify voters" during future editions of the contest. Previously, telecommunications providers were liable, but the EBU could not impose sanctions on them.

== 2012 contest ==
AMPTV withdrew from the Eurovision Song Contest 2012 in Baku (venue pictured) after a formal boycott by a group of Armenian musicians.

The 2012 contest was hosted by İTV at the Azerbaijani capital Baku, after its win in 2011. The Azerbaijani government temporarily amended its visa policy to allow Armenians, who are normally banned from entering the country, to attend the event. However, in February 2012, a boycott effort emerged in Armenia following an incident where a 20-year-old Armenian soldier was shot dead on the border between the two countries. Armenian officials initially blamed the soldier's death on an Azerbaijani sniper; however, conflicting reports indicated that the death was the result of friendly fire. Also in February, Azerbaijani president Ilham Aliyev made a statement re-affirming the country's stance against Armenians, arguing that they control "hypocritical and corrupt politicians." 22 Armenian musicians, including previous Armenian Eurovision representatives Emmy and Eva Rivas, signed an open letter supporting a boycott, stating that they would "refuse to appear in a country that is well known for the mass killings and massacres of Armenians, in a country where anti-Armenian sentiments have been elevated to the level of state policy."

On 7 March 2012, AMPTV announced that it would withdraw from the 2012 contest. The EBU stated that it was "truly disappointed" with their withdrawal, and that "despite the efforts of the EBU and the Host Broadcaster to ensure a smooth participation for the Armenian delegation in this year's contest, circumstances beyond our control lead to this unfortunate decision." İTV General Director Ismayil Omarov expressed his regret about AMPTV's withdrawal, believing that the Armenian presence could have been a "joint peace message to the world." Azerbaijani politician Ali Ahmadov also criticized the Armenian broadcaster for its decision, stating that "[its] refusal to take part in such a respected contest will cause even further damage to the already damaged image of Armenia." Due to its late withdrawal, AMPTV was required to pay its entry fee, plus a fine totalling half the value of the entry fee.

== 2015 contest ==
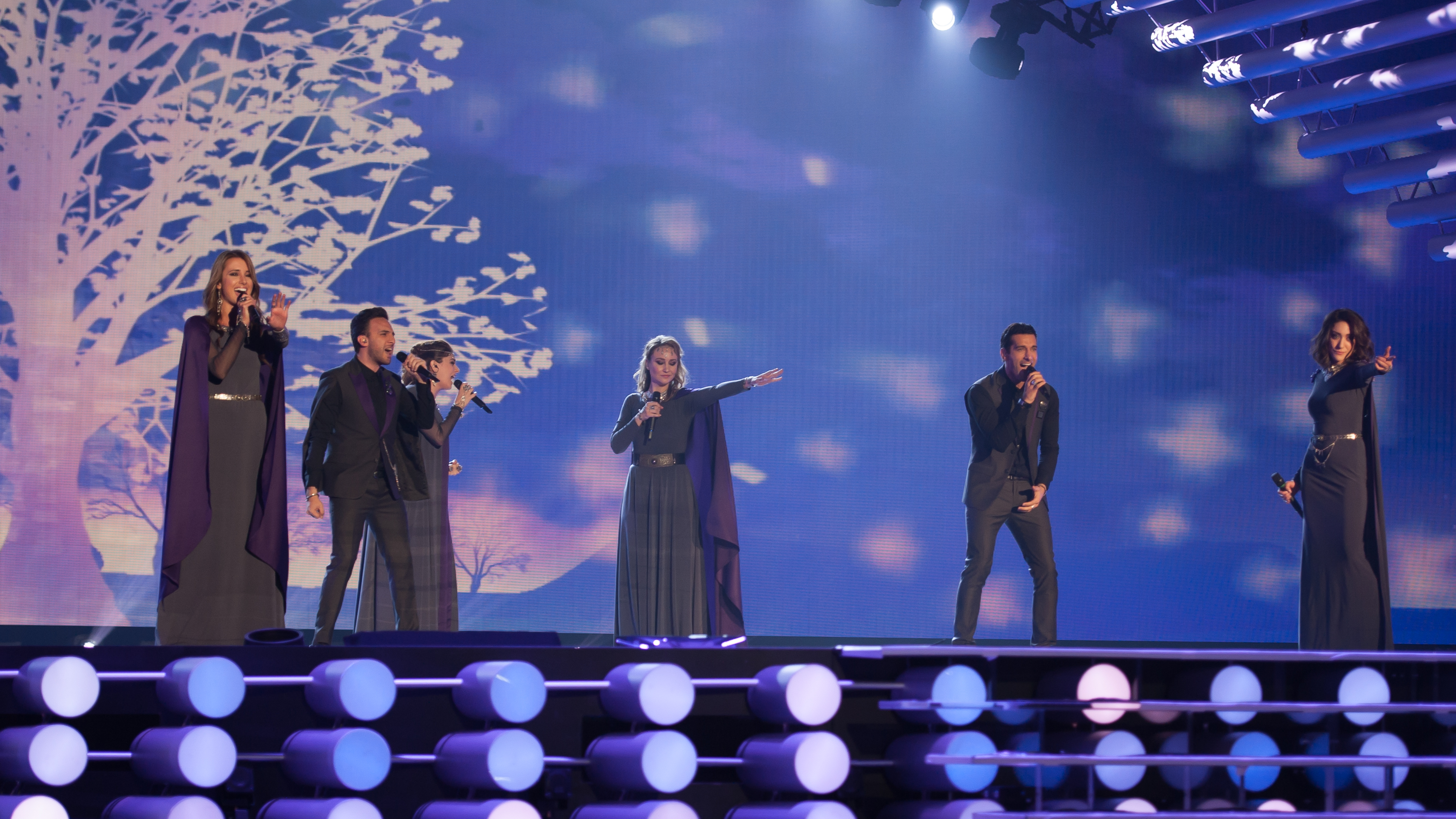
"Face the Shadow", the entry performed by Genealogy for Armenia in 2015, had its original title changed due to an alleged reference to the Armenian genocide.

Upon its unveiling in March 2015, media outlets characterized the Armenian entry in the 2015 contest, "Don't Deny", as being a tribute to the Armenian genocide, whose centenary was commemorated on 24 April 2015. The song was performed by Genealogy, a group whose composition alludes to the forget-me-not by consisting of five Armenian diaspora, along with a sixth singer based in Armenia and represented their unity. "Don't Deny" was perceived by critics to be a call for recognition of the genocide, further noting that the song's music video contained a scene depicting the group's members posing for a family photo in World War I-era outfits, and then disappearing from sight. Gohar Gasparyan, head of Armenia's Eurovision delegation, described the song as being about love and unity, and did not make reference to any specific political intent or themes. Representatives of Azerbaijan—which, alongside Turkey, denies the genocide—criticized the song for its alleged political themes, and stated that they would "act adequately" to prevent the contest from being "sacrificed to the political ambitions of a country."

On 16 March 2015, AMPTV announced that the title of the entry had been changed to "Face the Shadow". They stated that the new title was meant to "strengthen" the themes of the song, and to quell concerns over the alleged political subtext. The broadcaster continued to deny any specific political subtext in the song.

== 2016 contest ==
Despite the EBU allowing only the flags of full UN member states to be displayed at the 2016 contest, during the first semi-final on 10 May 2016, the Armenian representative Iveta Mukuchyan was seen holding the Artsakh flag, sparking backlash from the Azerbaijani press. During a press conference following the semi-final, Mukuchyan responded to the incident by stating that "You don't have to forget that I am representing my country in my heart, my thoughts, my feelings, and all my emotions. My thoughts are with my motherland, and what I want to spread is peace on borders. I wrote "LoveWave" because this was going on inside of me."

The EBU and the Reference Group released a statement the following day explaining that they "strongly condemn the brandishing of the Nagorno-Karabakh flag" during the live transmission of the first semi final, and consider the appearance "harmful" to the contest brand. The reference group consequently sanctioned AMPTV, with the nature of the sanction to be determined citing a breach of the rule stating "no messages promoting any organisation, institution, political cause or other causes shall be allowed in the shows". Furthermore, the reference group has pointed out that a further breach of the rules of the contest could lead to disqualification from the year's event or any successive editions. Hikmet Hajiyev, the spokesman for the Azerbaijani Ministry of Foreign Affairs, called the action of Mukuchyan "provocative" and unacceptable claiming that "the Armenian side deliberately resorts to such steps to encourage and promote the illegal formation created in the occupied Azerbaijani territories”.

== 2019 contest ==
After the final of the 2019 contest, İTV filed a complaint with the EBU for the graphics shown during the voting sequence. The graphics did not include Nakhchivan as within Azerbaijani borders when shown during the broadcast.

== 2021 contest ==
A Change.org petition called on the EBU to disqualify Samira Efendi, the Azerbaijani representative in the 2021 contest, from participating; AMPTV had withdrawn from that year's contest due to the political instability stemming from Armenia's defeat in the Second Nagorno-Karabakh War. The petition accused Efendi of using "hate speech", "discrimination", encouraging "killing of Armenians", sharing taglines that called Armenians "terrorists", and openly supporting the country's president Ilham Aliyev, while not providing a direct citation of the comments Efendi allegedly made. The Azerbaijani head of delegation Isa Melikov called the petition a "provocation", and the EBU did not address the petition, which had garnered around 10,000 signatures.

== Junior Eurovision ==
=== 2010 contest ===
Vladimir Arzumanyan, a singer from Nagorno-Karabakh representing Armenia, won the Junior Eurovision Song Contest 2010. It was alleged by Armenian media outlets that the İTV broadcast of the contest in Azerbaijan was interrupted when it became apparent that Armenia had won. These claims were disputed by AMPTV director and Eurovision head of delegation Diana Mnatsakanyan, who also denied reports that the broadcaster was preparing to file a complaint with the EBU over the matter. She noted that AMPTV did not know whether İTV even aired the contest at all, given that the broadcaster had not yet participated in the Junior Eurovision and had "no interest" in it at the time, and that reports about the alleged incident were limited to posts on Azerbaijani Internet forums. Azerbaijan would ultimately make its official debut at Junior Eurovision two years later.

=== 2021 contest ===
During the İTV broadcast of the Junior Eurovision Song Contest 2021, commentators talked over the entirety of the performance of Maléna, the Armenian representative and eventual winner, which is in contravention with the rules of the contest. The EBU sought clarification from İTV about the incident, but no response was received.

=== 2022 contest ===
Following Maléna's win in 2021, AMPTV was given the right to host the Junior Eurovision Song Contest 2022, which eventually took place in Yerevan. İTV later confirmed its non-participation in this edition without providing an official reason. The event drew widespread attention and interest in Armenia, and many Armenians attended the show and its side events. Groups of children from Nagorno-Karabakh were also among the attendees, but after the event finished, they were grounded in Armenian territory and unable to return home, as groups of self-described Azerbaijani "environmental activists" had set up a blockade on the Lachin corridor, the only road connecting Armenia with Nagorno-Karabakh.

=== 2025 contest ===
During the Junior Eurovision Song Contest 2025, the Azerbaijani jury awarded 3 points to the Armenian entrant Albert, marking the first time in any Eurovision event that Azerbaijan awarded points to Armenia.

== Voting history ==
=== Eurovision Song Contest ===
Despite largely hostile relations between the two nations over the years, Armenia has awarded points to Azerbaijan. Azerbaijan has never reciprocated; most Azerbaijani jurors that have been appointed to the contest have ranked Armenia last, while in the Azerbaijani televote, Armenia has been ranked last on nearly every occasion, with some exceptions.

The table below show the points awarded by Armenia to Azerbaijan in the Eurovision Song Contest since the latter debuted in the 2008 contest. Armenia has not received any votes from Azerbaijan so far.

Armenia → Azerbaijan
Points	Total	Years
12 points	0	
10 points	0	
8 points	0	
7 points	0	
6 points	0	
5 points	0	
4 points	0	
3 points	1	2009^{(TF)}
2 points	1	2008^{(SF)}
1 point	1	2009^{(F)}

Key

- SF: – Semi-final
- F: – Final
- T: – Televote
- J: – Jury vote

=== Junior Eurovision Song Contest ===
Since Armenia's debut in the Junior Eurovision Song Contest in 2007 and Azerbaijan's debut in 2012, the national juries of both countries had not awarded points to each other. This changed at the Junior Eurovision Song Contest 2025, when the Azerbaijani jury awarded 3 points to Armenia, marking the first time Azerbaijan awarded points to Armenia at any Eurovision event.

The table below show the points awarded by Azerbaijan to Armenia in the Junior Eurovision Song Contest. The table only show jury votes, as there have been no televotes so far. Azerbaijan has not received any votes from Armenia yet.

Azerbaijan → Armenia
Points	Total	Years
12 points	0	
10 points	0	
8 points	0	
7 points	0	
6 points	0	
5 points	0	
4 points	0	
3 points	1	2025
2 points	0	
1 point	0	

== See also ==
- Armenia–Azerbaijan relations
- Russia–Ukraine relations in the Eurovision Song Contest
