= Australia in the Eurovision Song Contest 2015 =

- Eurovision Song Contest 2015
- Participating broadcaster: Special Broadcasting Service (SBS)
- Country: Australia
- Selection process: Internal selection
- Announcement date: Artist: 3 March 2015; Song: 16 March 2015

Competing entry
- Song: "Tonight Again"
- Artist: Guy Sebastian
- Songwriters: Guy Sebastian; David Ryan Harris; Louis Schoorl

Placement
- Final result: 5th, 196 points

Participation chronology

Australia was represented at the Eurovision Song Contest 2015 with the song "Tonight Again", written by Guy Sebastian, David Ryan Harris, and Louis Schoorl, and performed by Guy Sebastian himself. The Australian participating broadcaster, Special Broadcasting Service (SBS), internally selected its entry for the contest. SBS received, for the first time ever, an invitation to participate from the European Broadcasting Union (EBU) as a "one-off" special guest to celebrate the 60th anniversary of the contest. This was the first-ever entry from Australia in the Eurovision Song Contest.

SBS announced Sebastian as its representative on 3 March 2015 during a press conference in Sydney. The song Sebastian performed, "Tonight Again", was presented to the public on 16 March 2015. The Australian coloratura soprano –of Armenian descent– Mary-Jean O'Doherty also participated in the 2015 contest as part of the group Genealogy representing Armenia.

Along with the members of the "Big Five" and Austria, Australia automatically qualified to compete in the final of the Eurovision Song Contest. In the final, Australia performed in position 12 and placed fifth out of the 27 participating countries, scoring 196 points. In terms of individual votes, Austria, Denmark, Hungary, Iceland, Netherlands, Norway, Poland, San Marino, Sweden, Switzerland, and the United Kingdom all placed Australia in the top three. Host nation Austria and winner of the contest Sweden awarded 12 points to Australia.

Following the 2015 contest, the EBU has considered the possibility of similarly inviting other guest countries to future editions of the contest. However, it was revealed in May 2015 that Australia might become a permanent participant following some reports by executive supervisor Jon Ola Sand to Sveriges Television. In November 2015, the EBU announced that SBS had been invited again to participate in the 2016 contest.

== Background ==
Special Broadcasting Service (SBS) has broadcast the Eurovision Song Contest since 1983, and the contest has gained a cult following over that time, primarily due to the country's strong political and cultural ties with Europe. Paying tribute to this, the 2014 contest semi-finals included an interval act featuring Australian singer Jessica Mauboy. Australian singers have also participated at Eurovision as representatives of other countries, including Olivia Newton-John (United Kingdom 1974), two-time winner Johnny Logan (Ireland 1980 and 1987), Gina G (United Kingdom 1996), and Jane Comerford as lead singer of Texas Lightning (Germany 2006).

Tying in with the goal of Eurovision—to showcase "the importance of bringing countries together to celebrate diversity, music and culture", the 2015 theme of "Building Bridges", and arguing that they could not hold "the world's biggest party" to celebrate the 60th edition of Eurovision without inviting Australia, the European Broadcasting Union (EBU) announced on 10 February 2015 that the country would compete at that year's edition as a special guest participant. Along with the "Big Five" (France, Germany, Italy, Spain and the United Kingdom), and the host country (Austria), Australia was given automatic entry into the final to "not reduce the chances" of the semi-final participants.

== Before Eurovision ==
=== Internal selection ===
SBS announced that it would select internally its entry for the Eurovision Song Contest 2015. On 16 February 2015, SBS announced an open submission for interested artists and songwriters to submit their entries until 20 February 2015. Artists and songwriters could hold any nationality, however preference would be given for citizens or permanent residents of Australia. In addition to the open call for submissions, additional entries were provided by artists and record companies directly invited by SBS.

Guy Sebastian was announced as the artist that would represent Australia at the Eurovision Song Contest 2015 on 5 March 2015. The announcement was made during a press conference which took place at the Sydney Opera House and hosted by Julia Zemiro and Sam Pang. In regards to his selection as the Australian representative, Sebastian stated: "It's incredibly exciting to be given the opportunity to perform at the Eurovision Song Contest. It is the biggest music event in the world with an amazing history and tradition and I'm truly honoured to be invited to represent Australia in its first time ever in the competition" Guy Sebastian was not the only Australian participating in the 2015 contest; Australian soprano Mary-Jean O'Doherty participated as a member of Genealogy, a group representing Armenia that consisted primarily of Armenian diaspora, while the Russian entry was co-written by an Australian, Katrina Noorbergen, who also performed backing vocals for their representative Polina Gagarina. The official video and digital download release of Guy Sebastian's Eurovision song, "Tonight Again", occurred on 16 March 2015. The song was written by Sebastian along with David Ryan Harris and Louis Schoorl.

When it came time to decide on a song, I thought since I had a couple of days off in Australia I would try and write something new. But if I was to record a new song I wanted it to be home-grown and organic with my band in my studio. Truly, we jumped in the studio and let it happen because I wanted to write something fun! We all have moments you don’t want to end and you wish you could live those moments every day so I wanted to write a song about that feeling. I am sure that is how I am going to feel when I am in Vienna performing.

— Guy Sebastian about "Tonight Again"

== At Eurovision ==
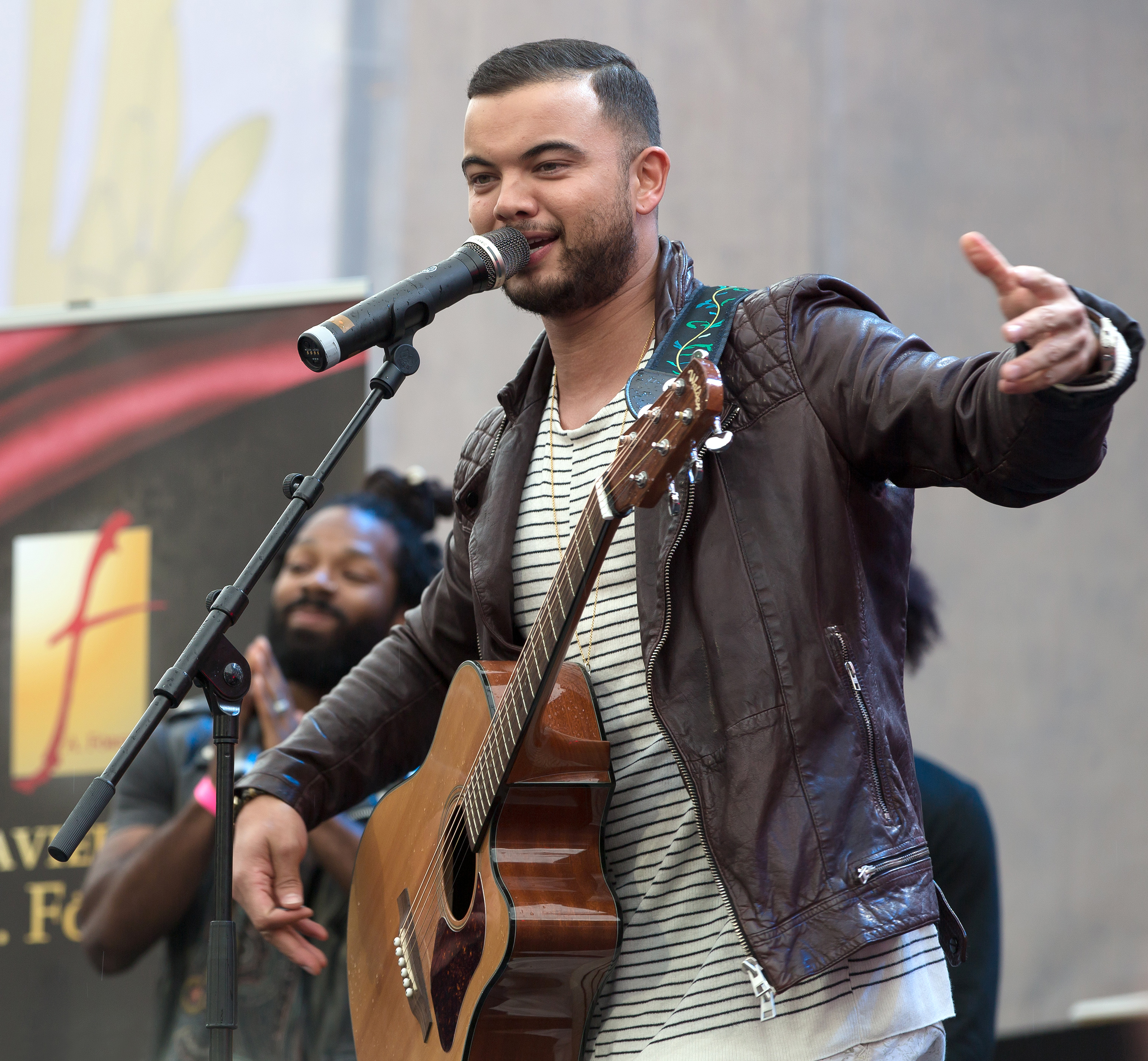
Guy Sebastian performing at the Eurovision Village in Vienna

According to Eurovision rules, all nations with the exceptions of the host country and the "Big Five" (France, Germany, Italy, Spain and the United Kingdom) are required to qualify from one of two semi-finals in order to compete for the final; the top ten countries from each semi-final progress to the final. Due to the special circumstances surrounding Australia's entry and "to not reduce the chances" of the semi-final participants, contest organisers allowed Australia to compete directly in the grand final on 23 May 2015 without pre-qualification. This raised the number of competitors in the grand final to 27. As part of their guest participation, Australia was also allowed to vote in both semi-finals as well as the grand final.

In Australia, both semi-finals and the final were broadcast live on SBS One at 5am AEST, allowing Australia to participate in the official voting period. In addition to live broadcasts early on Wednesday, Friday and Sunday mornings, all three shows were replayed in primetime on Friday, Saturday and Sunday nights. The commentators for all three shows were Julia Zemiro and Sam Pang. SBS appointed Lee Lin Chin as its spokesperson to announce the Australian votes during the final. Chin was announced as the voting spokesperson on an episode of The Feed on 18 May 2015.

According to OzTAM viewership ratings for metropolitan markets, the first semi-final attracted 75,000 viewers watching live on 20 May, with an additional 500,000 viewers watching a primetime replay on 22 May. The replay was the most watched program on any Australian television channel with viewers aged 16–39 on 22 May. The second semi-final was watched by 61,000 viewers live on 22 May, and an additional 639,000 viewers watching a primetime replay on 23 May. The latter is a record audience for any Eurovision broadcast in Australian history. The replay was also the most watched television program with viewers aged 16–49, and second most watched with viewers 25-54 on 23 May. The final was broadcast live on 24 May and replayed the same day in primetime. The live broadcast, airing between 5am and 9am AEST was watched by 263,000 viewers, while the primetime broadcast drew 592,000 viewers. The primetime replay improved on the 476,000 viewers that watched the 2014 final by more than 20%.

=== Final ===
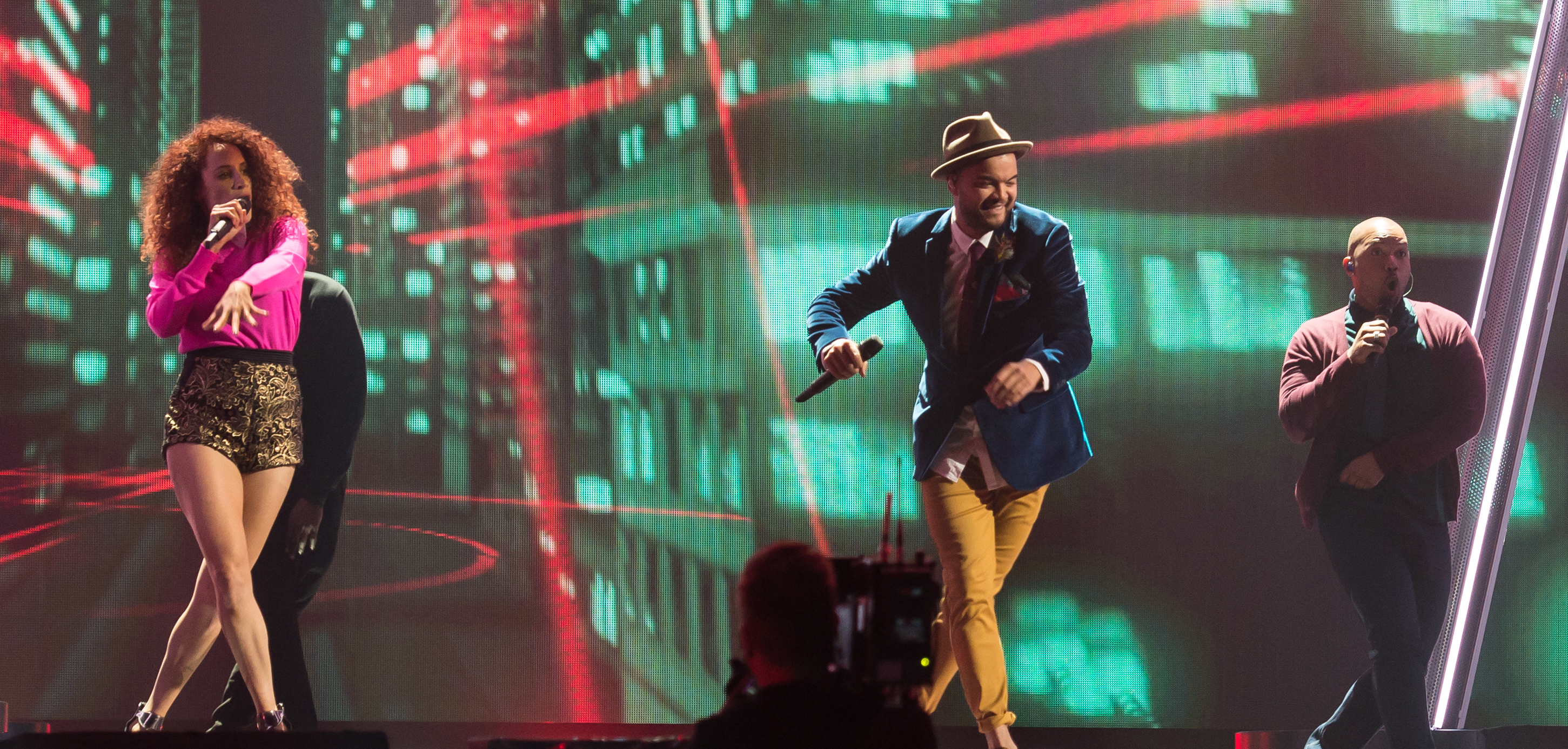
Guy Sebastian at a dress rehearsal for the final

Guy Sebastian took part in technical rehearsals on 17 and 20 May, followed by dress rehearsals on 22 and 23 May. This included the jury final where professional juries of each country, responsible for 50 percent of each country's vote, watched and voted on the competing entries. After technical rehearsals were held on 20 May, the "Big Five" countries, host nation Austria and Australia held a press conference. As part of this press conference, the artists took part in a draw to determine which half of the grand final they would subsequently participate in. Australia was drawn to compete in the first half. Following the conclusion of the second semi-final, the shows' producers decided upon the running order of the final. The running order for the semi-finals and final was decided by the shows' producers rather than through another draw, so that similar songs were not placed next to each other. Australia was subsequently placed to perform in position 12, following the entry from Cyprus and before the entry from Belgium.

The stage show featured Guy Sebastian dressed in a suit and joined by four backing vocalists, who performed choreographed movements. One of the main features of the performance were six giant illuminated lamp-post stage props which also expelled exploding pyrotechnics at the end of the song. The stage atmosphere and lighting featured red, orange, blue and yellow spotlights together with the background LED screens displaying moving roads and a nighttime cityscape. The four backing vocalists that joined Sebastian on stage were Carmen Smith, Aaron Marcellus, Brandon Winbush and Devin Michael.

At the conclusion of the voting, Australia finished in fifth place with 196 points. Australia received 12 points, the maximum number of points a country can give to another country, from two countries: Austria and Sweden. Australia's participation in the Eurovision was intended to be a one-off event; however, if Australia had won, it would have been able to return for the Eurovision Song Contest 2016. If this were to occur, the 2016 contest would have been co-produced by SBS and an EBU member broadcaster in a location in Europe.

=== Voting ===
Voting during the three shows consisted of 50 percent public televoting and 50 percent from a jury deliberation. The jury consisted of five music industry professionals who were citizens of the country they represent, with their names published before the contest to ensure transparency. This jury was asked to judge each contestant based on: vocal capacity; the stage performance; the song's composition and originality; and the overall impression by the act. In addition, no member of a national jury could be related in any way to any of the competing acts in such a way that they cannot vote impartially and independently. The individual rankings of each jury member were released shortly after the grand final.

Following the release of the full split voting by the EBU after the conclusion of the competition, it was revealed that Australia had placed sixth with the public televote and fourth with the jury vote. In the public vote, Australia scored 132 points and in the jury vote the nation scored 224 points.

Below is a breakdown of points awarded to Australia and awarded by Australia in both semi-finals and the grand final of the contest, and the breakdown of the jury voting and televoting conducted during the three shows:

==== Points awarded to Australia ====
Points awarded to Australia (Final)
Score	Country
12 points	Austria; Sweden
10 points	Norway; United Kingdom
8 points	Denmark; Hungary; Iceland; Netherlands; Poland; San Marino; Switzerland
7 points	Germany; Israel; Spain
6 points	Belarus; Italy; Malta
5 points	Estonia; Finland; Greece; Ireland; Latvia
4 points	Belgium; Cyprus; Moldova; Russia
3 points	Albania; Lithuania; Serbia
2 points	France; Romania; Slovenia
1 point	Armenia

==== Points awarded by Australia ====
Points awarded by Australia (Semi-final 1)
Score	Country
12 points	Serbia
10 points	Russia
8 points	Belgium
7 points	Georgia
6 points	Greece
5 points	Estonia
4 points	Denmark
3 points	Macedonia
2 points	Hungary
1 point	Romania

Points awarded by Australia (Semi-final 2)
Score	Country
12 points	Sweden
10 points	Latvia
8 points	Norway
7 points	Israel
6 points	Cyprus
5 points	Slovenia
4 points	Lithuania
3 points	Malta
2 points	Azerbaijan
1 point	Poland

Points awarded by Australia (Final)
Score	Country
12 points	Sweden
10 points	Russia
8 points	Italy
7 points	Latvia
6 points	Belgium
5 points	Serbia
4 points	Norway
3 points	Estonia
2 points	Israel
1 point	Georgia

==== Detailed voting results ====
The following members comprised the Australian jury:

- Amanda Pelman (jury chairperson) – producer
- Richard Wilkins – radio DJ, entertainment journalist
- Danielle Spencer – singer, songwriter
- Ash London – radio broadcaster, TV presenter
- Jake Stone – singer, songwriter, performer

Detailed voting results from Australia (Semi-final 1)
R/O	Country	A. Pelman	R. Wilkins	D. Spencer	A. London	J. Stone	Jury Rank	Televote Rank	Combined Rank	Points
01	Moldova	14	10	11	16	14	15	11	13	
02	Armenia	13	15	14	15	16	16	12	14	
03	Belgium	16	13	1	3	2	6	2	3	8
04	Netherlands	11	6	6	7	6	7	15	12	
05	Finland	10	14	16	9	7	12	9	11	
06	Greece	9	3	5	5	8	5	6	5	6
07	Estonia	12	5	12	10	9	10	3	6	5
08	Macedonia	4	16	9	13	12	11	5	8	3
09	Serbia	2	2	13	2	4	3	1	1	12
10	Hungary	3	9	4	6	5	4	13	9	2
11	Belarus	15	12	10	14	13	14	14	15	
12	Russia	1	1	2	1	1	1	4	2	10
13	Denmark	7	4	8	11	10	8	7	7	4
14	Albania	6	11	15	12	15	13	16	16	
15	Romania	8	8	7	8	11	9	10	10	1
16	Georgia	5	7	3	4	3	2	8	4	7

Detailed voting results from Australia (Semi-final 2)
R/O	Country	A. Pelman	R. Wilkins	D. Spencer	A. London	J. Stone	Jury Rank	Televote Rank	Combined Rank	Points
01	Lithuania	7	14	15	6	9	9	7	7	4
02	Ireland	6	2	5	9	15	6	13	11	
03	San Marino	17	16	17	17	16	17	17	17	
04	Montenegro	16	15	9	8	8	11	11	12	
05	Malta	13	10	14	11	10	13	4	8	3
06	Norway	9	3	1	2	3	2	5	3	8
07	Portugal	14	12	12	12	7	12	12	14	
08	Czech Republic	15	13	7	10	17	15	15	15	
09	Israel	3	17	8	5	5	7	2	4	7
10	Latvia	10	4	2	4	2	4	3	2	10
11	Azerbaijan	4	6	4	3	4	3	14	9	2
12	Iceland	5	9	16	16	14	14	10	13	
13	Sweden	1	1	3	1	1	1	1	1	12
14	Switzerland	11	11	13	15	13	16	16	16	
15	Cyprus	2	8	6	7	6	5	8	5	6
16	Slovenia	8	7	10	13	12	8	6	6	5
17	Poland	12	5	11	14	11	10	9	10	1

Detailed voting results from Australia (Final)
R/O	Country	A. Pelman	R. Wilkins	D. Spencer	A. London	J. Stone	Jury Rank	Televote Rank	Combined Rank	Points
01	Slovenia	20	13	26	26	26	24	19	22	
02	France	18	12	20	14	17	21	24	24	
03	Israel	8	25	9	9	14	11	8	9	2
04	Estonia	16	16	19	10	10	13	6	8	3
05	United Kingdom	4	23	8	19	25	18	9	11	
06	Armenia	19	24	25	22	24	26	13	21	
07	Lithuania	17	21	21	11	9	17	12	13	
08	Serbia	13	4	22	4	8	9	3	6	5
09	Norway	7	7	4	6	3	3	10	7	4
10	Sweden	2	3	3	1	2	2	1	1	12
11	Cyprus	3	6	17	18	12	10	17	12	
12	Australia									
13	Belgium	24	18	2	2	4	8	2	5	6
14	Austria	5	17	15	20	21	15	20	19	
15	Greece	22	9	16	17	15	20	11	15	
16	Montenegro	26	19	18	25	23	25	21	25	
17	Germany	12	8	14	24	11	12	18	14	
18	Poland	25	11	24	23	22	22	23	23	
19	Latvia	15	5	5	7	5	4	5	4	7
20	Romania	23	15	10	12	19	19	14	18	
21	Spain	14	20	11	13	20	16	16	16	
22	Hungary	10	22	12	15	16	14	22	20	
23	Georgia	9	10	7	16	6	7	15	10	1
24	Azerbaijan	6	14	13	8	7	6	26	17	
25	Russia	1	1	1	3	1	1	7	2	10
26	Albania	21	26	23	21	18	23	25	26	
27	Italy	11	2	6	5	13	5	4	3	8
