= Stephanie Topalian =

American singer

- Born: Stephanie Nonoshita Topalian; August 5, 1987 (age 39); Los Angeles, California, U.S.
- Citizenship: Armenia (since 2015); Japan (until 2015); United States (Note: According to Japanese nationality law, Japanese citizens with dual citizenship had to renounce one of their citizenships upon turning 22. Therefore, Stephanie chose to retain her Japanese citizenship.) (until 2009)
- Occupations: Singer; Actress
- Years active: 2007–present
- Musical career
- Genres: Pop
- Label: SME Records
- Formerly of: Genealogy

Stephanie Nonoshita Topalian (born August 5, 1987), known simply as Stephanie (ステファニー, Sutefanī), is an American-born singer and actress of Armenian and Japanese descent who is signed with SME Records Japan, which is a part of Sony Music. She released two albums: her self-titled debut in 2008 and Colors of my Voice in 2009. She has won the Japanese Music Awards in 2007. A number of her songs have been featured in several Japanese films. She had roles in a few Japanese films, notably Pride and Tokyo Tribe. In 2015, she represented Armenia in the Eurovision Song Contest 2015 as a member of Armenian super group project Genealogy with the song "Face the Shadow".

== Career ==
She began singing at a young age. At age 13, she moved to Japan with her family. At 14, Stephanie sent an audio demo tape of her singing to various music productions, and received a response from a Japanese music producer Joe Rinoie. Rinoie was impressed with her singing, and at the age of 19 Stephanie made her major debut in Japan from SME Records (Sony). She achieved the "Best New Artist Award" at the prestigious 49th Japan Record Awards in 2007 and afterwards released two albums.

Her debut single "Kimiga Iru Kagiri" and the follow-up single "Because of You" became the ending themes of the anime Kiss Dum. Her fifth single, “Changin", was also featured as the last ending theme of the anime D.Gray-man. In early 2008, her single "Friends" became the second ending theme for the anime Gundam 00. The song appeared in the Top 10 of Japanese Oricon charts.

As an actress Stephanie debuted in the film Pride in 2009, based on Yukari Ichijo's shōjo comic. She portrayed the protagonist Shio Asami and took part in the film's theme song, "Pride ~A Part of Me~" that featured SRM. Aside from Pride, Stephanie also starred in 2009 in the short film It's All Good which was fully scripted in English. She was cast in 2014 to be in Tokyo Tribe and a short film.

== Eurovision ==
In February 2015 she was announced as a member of the music group Genealogy (made up of singers from Armenia and the Armenian diaspora) that represented Armenia in the Eurovision Song Contest 2015. Stephanie Topalian represents the Asian continent in the formation whereas the Ethiopian Vahe Tilbian represents Africa, the American Tamar Kaprelian the American continent, the French Essaï Altounian the European continent, Australian Mary-Jean O'Doherty Basmadjian Oceania and Inga Arshakyan Armenia. The group sang "Face the Shadow" at the contest in Vienna, Austria. She then became an Armenian citizen along with the other members of Genealogy on April 28, 2015, after being given Armenian passports by President Serzh Sargsyan.

== Discography ==
=== Studio albums ===
List of albums, with selected chart positions
Title	Album details	Peak positions
Title	Album details	JPN Oricon
Stephanie (ステファニー)	Released: March 5, 2008; Label: SME Records; Formats: CD, CD/DVD, digital download	25
Colors of My Voice	Released: June 17, 2009; Label: SME Records; Formats: CD, CD/DVD, digital download	102
"—" denotes items which did not chart, or were released before the creation of a chart.

=== Singles ===
==== As a lead artist ====
List of singles, with selected chart positions
Title	Year	Peak chart positions		Certifications	Album
Title	Year	JPN Oricon	JPN Hot 100 (Note: Sources for chart positions are as follows: "Friends", "Beyond Myself", "Pride (A Part of Me)".)	Certifications	Album
"Kimi ga Iru Kagiri" (君がいる限り; "As Long as I Have You")	2007	36	—		Stephanie
"Because of You"	2007	50	—		Stephanie
"Winter Gold"	2007	80	—		Stephanie
"Friends" (フレンズ, Furenzu)	2008	8	7	RIAJ (digital): Gold	Stephanie
"Changin’" (featuring Roma Tanaka)	2008	50	— (Note: "Changin'" did not enter the Billboard Japan Hot 100, but peaked at number 48 on the physical Top Single Sales chart.)		Colors of My Voice
"Pride (A Part of Me)" (featuring SRM)	2009	82	63		Colors of My Voice
"Future"	2009	155	—		Colors of My Voice
"Towa ni" (永遠に; "Forever")	2012	—	—		Non-album singles
"Sakura Zaka" (桜坂; "Cherry Blossom Hill")	2012	—	—		Non-album singles
"Precious Love"	2012	—	—		Non-album singles
"—" denotes items that did not chart, or were released before the creation of the Billboard Japan Hot 100 in 2008.

==== As a featured artist ====
List of singles, with selected chart positions
Title	Year	Peak chart positions	Album
Title	Year	ICE	Album
"Face the Shadow" (among Genealogy)	2015	47	Non-album singles
"The Otherside" (Tamar Kaprelian featuring Elhaida Dani, Elina Born, Maria-Elena Kyriakou & Stephanie Topalian)	2015	—	Non-album singles
"—" denotes items that did not chart.

=== Promotional singles ===
List of singles, with selected chart positions
Title	Year	Peak chart positions	Album
Title	Year	JPN Hot 100	Album
"Beyond Myself"	2008	76	Stephanie

== Guest appearances ==
Title	Year	Other artists	Album
"Twister (Kingdom Mix)"	2012	Takeharu Ishimoto	Kingdom Hearts Dream Drop Distance Original Soundtrack
"Someday (Kingdom Mix)"	2012	Takeharu Ishimoto	Kingdom Hearts Dream Drop Distance Original Soundtrack
"Jump Over Yourself (Papapayapa)"	2013	Takeharu Ishimoto	Subarashiki Kono Sekai Crossover: Tribute
"Calling (Kingdom Mix) (Live Ver.)"	2013	Takeharu Ishimoto, The Death March	Subarashiki Kono Sekai Crossover: Tribute
"Chase"	2021	Takeharu Ishimoto	Neo: The World Ends with You Original Soundtrack
"Rockin' Rockin'"	2021	Takeharu Ishimoto	Neo: The World Ends with You Original Soundtrack
"Scramble"	2021	Takeharu Ishimoto	Neo: The World Ends with You Original Soundtrack
"Divide"	2021	Takeharu Ishimoto	Neo: The World Ends with You Original Soundtrack
"Jump Over Yourself"	2021	Takeharu Ishimoto	Neo: The World Ends with You Original Soundtrack
"Last Call"	2021	Takeharu Ishimoto	Neo: The World Ends with You Original Soundtrack
"Little Things"	2021	Takeharu Ishimoto	Neo: The World Ends with You Original Soundtrack
