= Paris Opera Awards =

French international opera contest

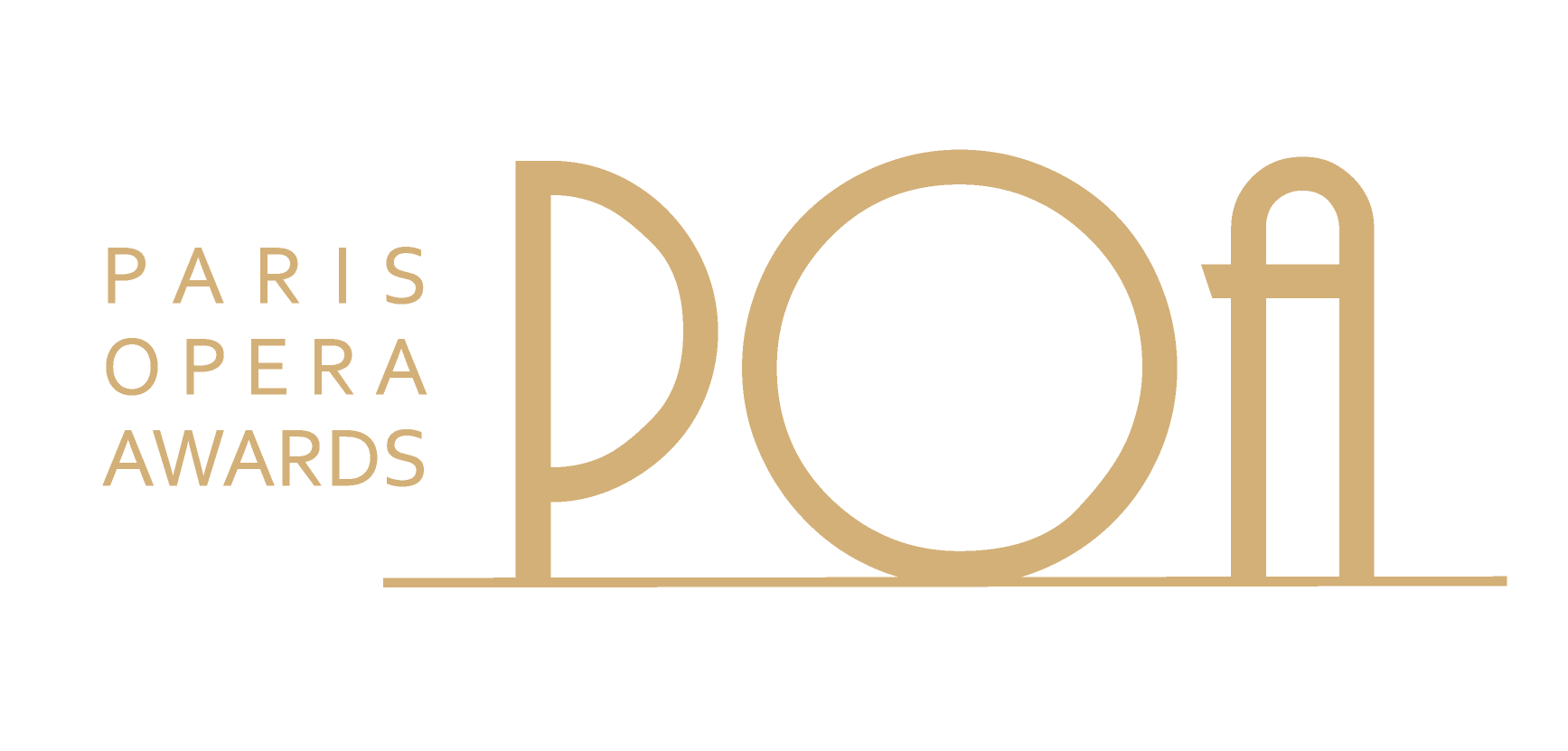
- Company type: Vocal competition
- Founded: 2012
- Headquarters: Paris, France

The Paris Opera Awards (POA) was an international contest for opera singers held in Paris, France. It is held under the patronage of the French representation at the European Commission.

== History ==
The first edition of POA was launched in March 2012. It allowed 78 opera singers from all over the world to participate. The 50 best results were reviewed by the panel of judges. The ten finalists, five of each gender, auditioned for the judges at the Salle Gaveau in Paris on January 4, 2013. Olivier Bellamy of Radio Classique was the host. The gala was dedicated to Maria Callas.

== Objective ==
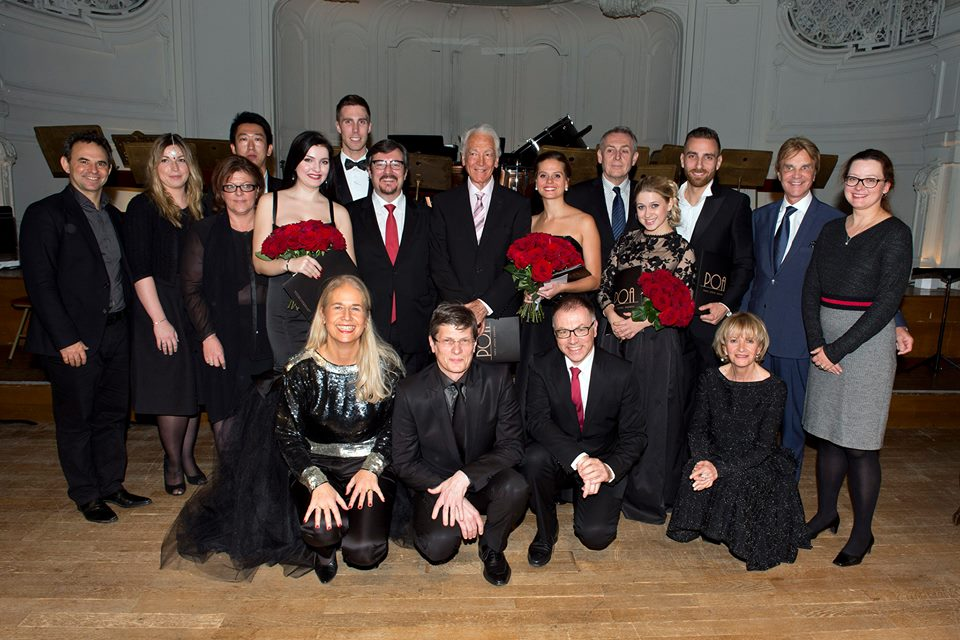
Awards ceremony 2014

This award is an international competition for opera singers. It aims to help showcase opera singers to the professional opera world and to the Parisian public. The contest is open to all opera singers aged 18 or older. It is open to the following voice types: soprano, mezzo-soprano, contralto, countertenor, tenor, baritone, and bass. The winners are chosen by the judges at the finals gala in Paris which is open to the public. The most important prize that the competition confers is the fame that the award confers.

== Organization ==
The contest includes several rounds: preliminary, semi-final and final. Following these events, the awards are chosen by the Grand Jury. The competition is organized annually by the Association POA located at 7, rue Albert-de-Lapparent in Paris in the 7th arrondissement. The contest rules are posted on the website and translated into several languages.

== Jury 2013 and 2014 ==
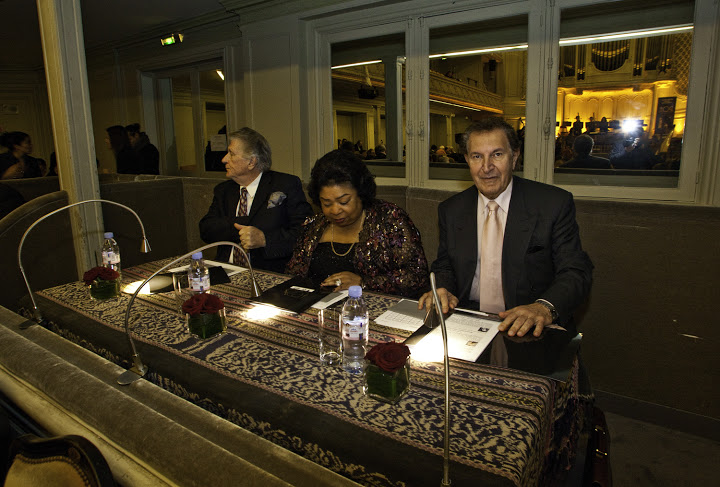
Grand jury, 2013

The jury is composed of noted individuals of the music world: opera singers, conductors, directors opera houses and artistic agents. The grand jury for 2013 (first edition) was composed of three renowned artists from the world of opera: Sherrill Milnes, baritone (United States), Martina Arroyo, soprano (United States) and Daniel Lipton, conductor (Canada). After the finals concert they selected six winners, three women and three men. There was also an audience award given and a special prize in honor of Maria Callas was given by the organizers.

The panel of judges for the 2014 contest consisted of:

- Richard Bonynge, (Australian conductor, president of jury)
- Martina Franck, (from Germany, artistic director at Cologne Opera)
- Ève Ruggiéri, (producer, TV and radio host, from France)
- Maurice Xiberras, managing director at the Opéra de Marseille (France)
- Germinal Hilbert, founder and chairman of Hilbert Artists Management (Germany)
- Dominique Riber, artistic chief officer and artists manager at Opéra et Concert in Paris (France)
- Christian Schirm, director of The Atelier Lyrique of Opéra national de Paris (France)
- Vincent Monteil, director of The Opera Studio at the Opéra national du Rhin (France)
- Sophie Duffaut, artistic administrator at Chorégies d'Orange festival (France)

== Winners and finalists ==
=== 2013 ===
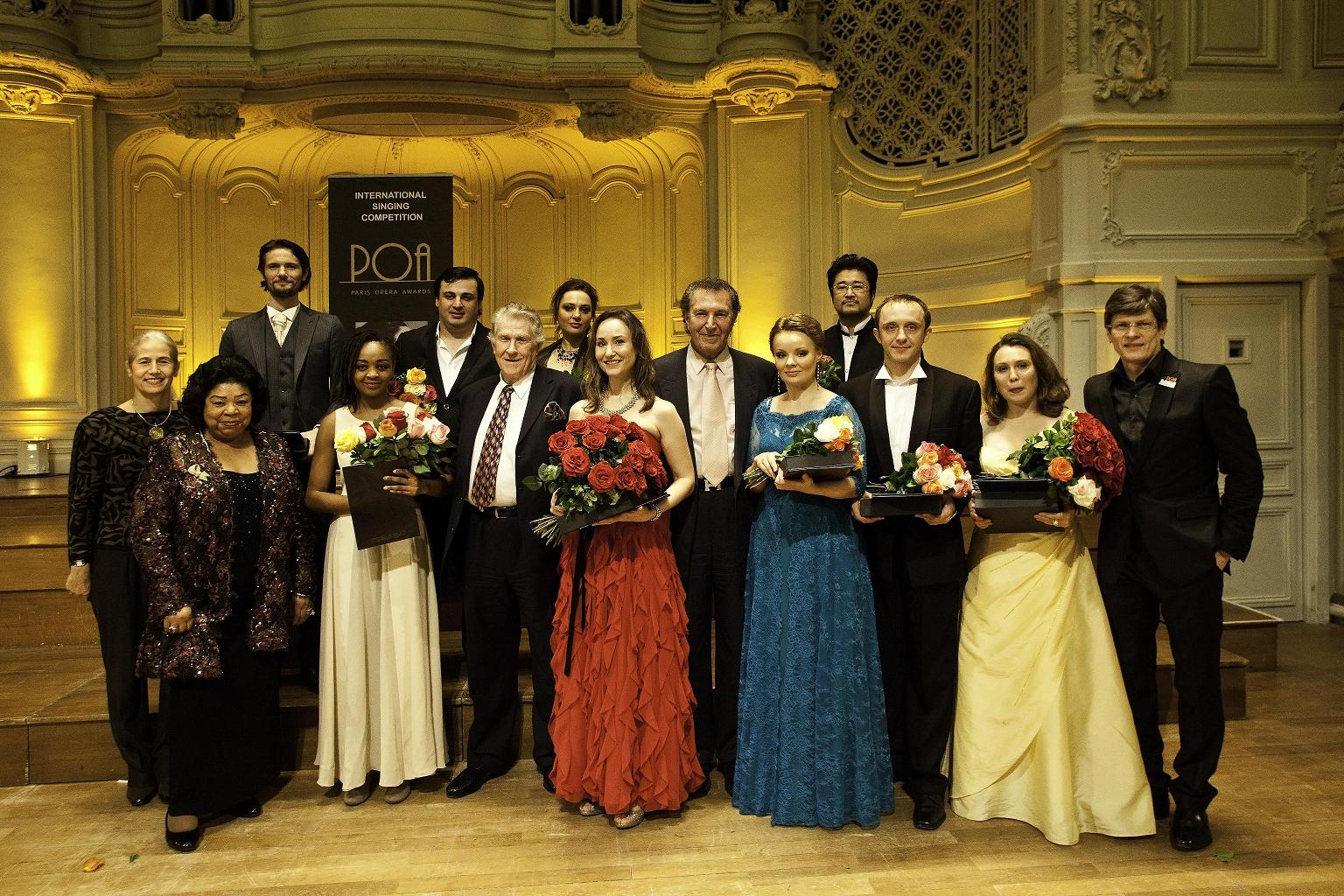
Grand jury finalists, 2013

Here are the finalists and results from 2013.

Results of Paris Opera Awards 2013
Country	Contestant	Voice type	Result
Women
Australia	Mary-Jean O'Doherty	Coloratura soprano	(gold) Winner
United States	Jennifer O'Loughlin	Coloratura soprano	(silver) Runner-up
Ukraine	Ulyana Aleksyuk	Coloratura soprano	(bronze) Third place
Men
France	Julien Dran	Tenor	(gold) Winner
Russia	Dmitry Lavrov	Baritone	(silver) Runner-up
South Korea	Nam Kyu Choung	Tenor	(bronze) Third place
Other Awards
United States	Jennifer O'Loughlin	Coloratura soprano	Maria Callas Award
United States	Jennifer O'Loughlin	Coloratura soprano	Audience Award

=== 2014 ===
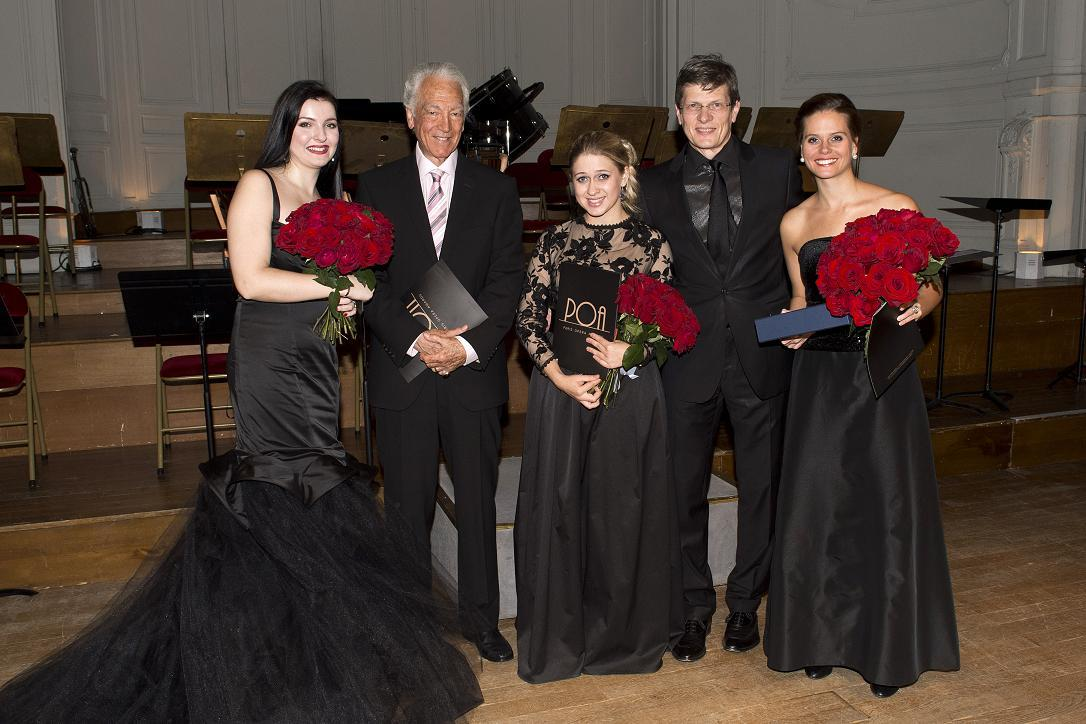
Awards ceremony 2014

Here are the finalists and results from 2014.

Results of Paris Opera Awards 2014
Country	Contestant	Voice type	Result
Women
Russia	Daria Terekhova	Coloratura soprano	(gold) Winner
Georgia	Marina Nachkebiya	Coloratura soprano	(silver) Runner-up
Switzerland	Leonie Renaud	Coloratura soprano	(bronze) Third place
Men
Italy	Pietro di Bianco	Bass-baritone	(gold) Winner
China	Xiaohan Zhai	Bass-baritone	(silver) Runner-up
Australia	Sam Roberts-Smith	Baritone	(bronze) Third place
Other Awards
Australia	Sam Roberts-Smith	Baritone	Best Performance Award
Russia	Daria Terekhova	Coloratura soprano	Audience Award
