= Face the Shadow =

Song

Single by Genealogy
- Released: 12 March 2015
- Recorded: February 2015
- Genre: Pop
- Length: 3:02
- Label: AMPTV; Universal Music
- Songwriter: Inna Mkrtchyan

Eurovision Song Contest 2015 entry
- Country: Armenia
- Artists: Essaï Altounian; Inga Arshakyan; Tamar Kaprelian; Mary-Jean O'Doherty; Vahe Tilbian; Stephanie Topalian
- As: Genealogy
- Composer: Armen Martirosyan
- Lyricist: Inna Mkrtchyan

Finals performance
- Semi-final result: 7th
- Semi-final points: 77
- Final result: 16th
- Final points: 34

Entry chronology
- ◄ "Not Alone" (2014)
- "LoveWave" (2016) ►

Music video
- "Face the Shadow" on YouTube

"Face the Shadow" (formerly known as "Don't Deny") is a song performed by Armenian supergroup Genealogy. The song is composed by Armen Martirosyan and the lyrics are by Inna Mkrtchyan. The song represented Armenia in the Eurovision Song Contest 2015 on 23 May 2015, finishing 16th overall, with a total of 34 points from only 8 countries including a maximum 12 points from Georgia.

== Background ==
Genealogy is made up of Armenians representing the five continents (Africa, Asia, Americas, Europe, Oceania) and a representative from Armenia. The five Armenian diaspora artists at the same time symbolise the five petals of the forget-me-not flower. In their centre, the group is unified by a sixth artist, who is from Armenia.

Members in alphabetical order of surname are:

- Essaï Altounian - France - representing Europe's Armenians
- Inga Arshakyan - Armenia
- Tamar Kaprelian - USA, representing Armenians from the Americas
- Mary-Jean O'Doherty Vasmatzian - Australia, representing Oceania
- Vahe Tilbian - Ethiopia, representing Armenians from Africa
- Stephanie Topalian - Japan, representing Armenians from Asia

== Composition ==
The lyrics of the song was written by Inna Mkrtchyan, while it was composed by Armen Martirosyan who has worked on Eva Rivas' "Apricot Stone" in 2010. The site of Eurovision has stated that "Face the Shadow" is about universal values and its message tells that "happiness is born when people are united and live in harmony with themselves, their families, love relationships and so on".

== Music video ==
A music video for the song directed by Aren Bayadyan was shot in late February 2015. The director has stated that the team was inspired by the name of the group and its logo, the tree of life. Writing about the music video, the official site of the contest states. "The concept of the video is the idea of genealogy: the captured family is considered as the symbol of humanity: the base is the shift of generations and the phenomena that the new generation is always replacing the previous one carrying out the traditions and values in them." The designer of the music video is Armen Galyan who combined Armenian and European fashion approaches finding modern solutions. The video features the performers singing in a gray maze, wearing pins with pictures of their grandparents and patterns on their clothes, alternating with scenes of families posing for photographs in World-War I style clothes and close-ups of hands embroidering a bird on piece of fabric. In the final scene of the video, the six members of Genealogy, wearing WWI style clothes, pose together for a photography. The music video for "Face the Shadow" was premiered on 12 March on Armenia 1 and was uploaded to Eurovision's official channel on YouTube.

== Reception ==
Upon its unveiling, "Face the Shadow" became the subject of controversy due to allegations that the song conveyed political messages. In particular, it was believed that the song was intended to pay tribute to the victims of the Armenian genocide (whose centenary was commemorated roughly a month prior to the contest on 24 April 2015), with its lyrics and its original title, "Don't Deny", perceived to be a call for recognition of the genocide. Critics also alleged that the song's music video contained visuals alluding to the genocide, with one scene depicting the group's members posing for a family photo in World War I-era outfits, and then disappearing from sight. Representatives of Azerbaijan—which, alongside Turkey, denies the genocide—criticized the song for its alleged political themes, and stated that they would "act adequately" to prevent the contest from being "sacrificed to the political ambitions of a country."

On 16 March 2015, the Armenian delegation announced that it would change the title of the song from "Don't Deny" to "Face the Shadow" to quell concerns over the alleged political themes of the song and to "strengthen" its themes; the song's original title still appears as part of its refrain. The delegation continues to deny any specific political subtext in the song.

"Face the Shadow" received 7.19 out of 10 points from a jury of Eurovision blog Wiwibloggs.

== Charts ==
Chart (2015)	Peak position
Iceland (Icelandic Singles Chart)	47
