= Genealogy (band) =

Armenian popular music group, 2015

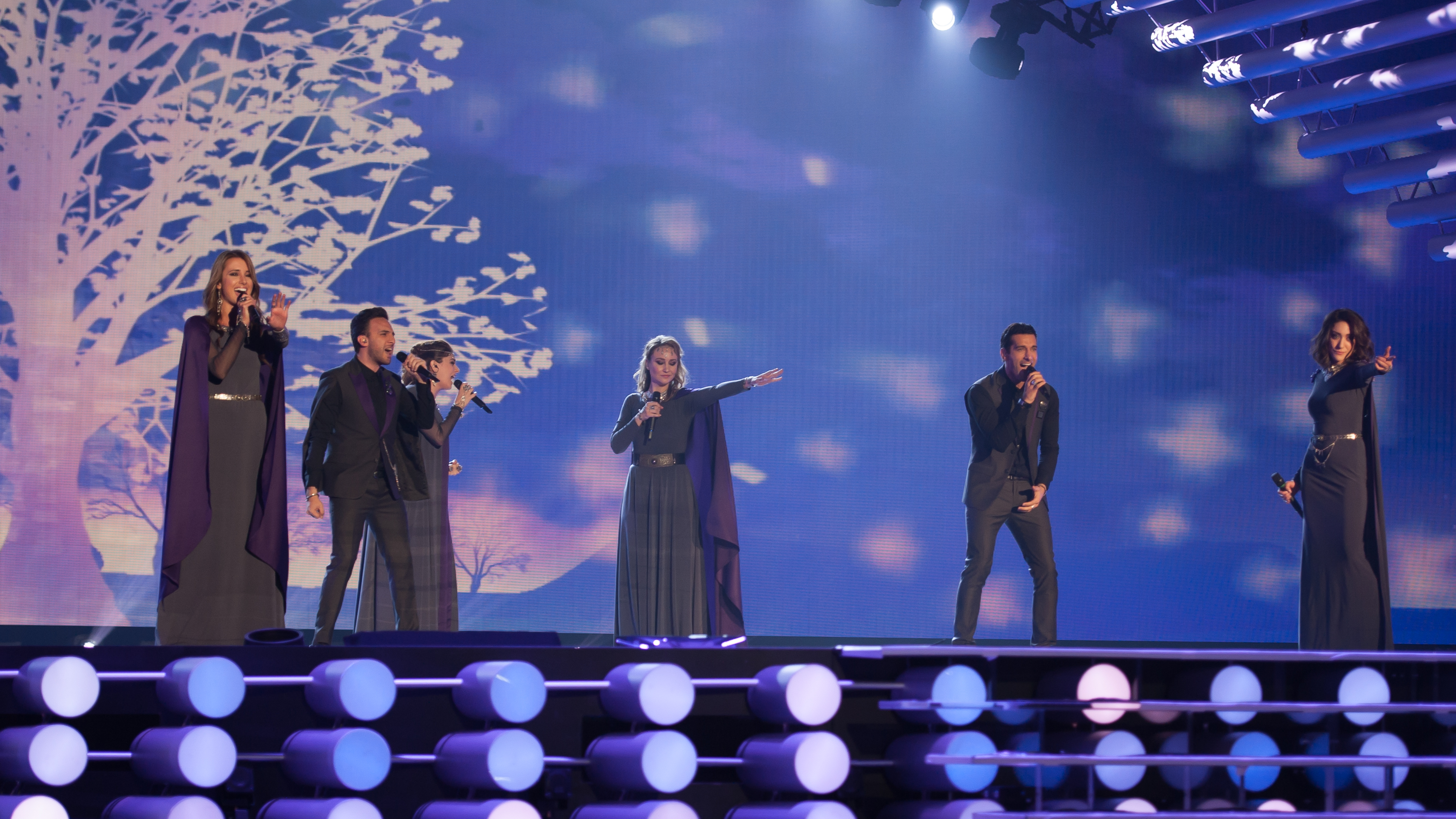
- Genealogy at a Eurovision Song Contest 2015 rehearsal (L-R: Tamar Kaprelian, Vahe Tilbian, Inga Arshakyan, Mary-Jean O'Doherty Basmadjian, Essaï Altounian, and Stephanie Topalian)

Background information
- Origin: Armenia
- Years active: 2015
- Past members: Essaï Altounian (Europe); Tamar Kaprelian (Americas); Vahe Tilbian (Africa); Stephanie Topalian (Asia); Mary-Jean O'Doherty Basmadjian (Oceania); Inga Arshakyan (Armenia)
- Website: www.genealogyofficial.com

Genealogy was an Armenian supergroup that was formed to represent Armenia in the Eurovision Song Contest 2015. Five of the six members come from a different continent of the Armenian diaspora whose families once spread all over the world after the Armenian genocide of 1915. The five artists from the diaspora also symbolize the five petals of the forget-me-not (official logo of the 100th anniversary of the Armenian genocide, commemorated in April 2015), while the center of the flower is represented by the sixth artist, based in Armenia.

The group performed the song "Face the Shadow" in the contest. The song was originally called "Don't Deny", but organizers changed it later to the present title, as it was deemed too political (hinting at Armenian genocide denial). The song represented Armenia in the Eurovision Song Contest 2015 on the final held on 23 May 2015, finishing 16th overall, with a total of 34 points from only 8 countries including a maximum 12 points from Georgia.

== Members ==
The first member of the group, Essaï Altounian, a French-Armenian, was announced on 16 February 2015. The second member of the group, Tamar Kaprelian, an Armenian-American singer, was announced on 20 February 2015. The third member being Vahe Tilbian, an Armenian-Ethiopian singer, was announced on 23 February 2015. The fourth member was Stephanie Topalian, a U.S.-born singer residing in Japan. Her father is Armenian and her mother is Japanese; her membership was announced on 27 February 2015. The fifth member is Mary-Jean O'Doherty Basmadjian, a U.S.-born Australian opera singer of Armenian descent. Her membership was announced on 3 March 2015. The sixth member is Inga Arshakyan, who also represented Armenia at the Eurovision Song Contest 2009 in Moscow, along with her sister, Anush.

On 28 April 2015 the five Armenian diaspora members of the group, the American Kaprelian, the Australian O'Doherty Basmadjian, the Ethiopian Tilbian, the French Altounian and the Japanese Topalian, became Armenian citizens and at the end of an audience with President Serzh Sargsyan were given their Armenian passports by the President. The sixth member Inga Arshakyan already carries Armenian citizenship.

Continent	Country	Artist	Birth date	Date announced
Africa	Ethiopia	Vahe Tilbian	17 February 1980	23 February 2015
Americas	United States	Tamar Kaprelian	28 October 1986	20 February 2015
Asia	Japan	Stephanie Topalian	5 August 1987	27 February 2015
Europe	France	Essaï Altounian	5 November 1980	16 February 2015
Oceania	Australia	Mary-Jean O'Doherty Basmadjian	2 April 1982	3 March 2015
Armenia	Armenia	Inga Arshakyan	18 March 1982	12 March 2015

== Discography ==
=== Singles ===
Title	Year	Peak chart positions	Album
Title	Year	ICE	Album
"Face the Shadow"	2015	47	Non-album single(s)

== After Eurovision ==
Tamar Kaprelian, Stephanie Topalian, and Mary-Jean O'Doherty Basmadjian released a collective single, "The Otherside", alongside fellow Eurovision 2015 finalists Elhaida Dani, Elina Born, and Maria-Elena Kyriakou. Kaprelian also competed in Depi Evratesil 2018 with the song "Poison (Ari Ari)". She was eliminated in the semifinal.

Essaï Altounian was a judge in Depi Evratesil 2017, where he mentored Artsvik to victory. In 2019, he was a member of the "Wall of the World" panel on the CBS talent competition The World's Best.

Awards and achievements
Preceded by Aram Mp3 with "Not Alone"	Armenia in the Eurovision Song Contest; 2015	Succeeded by Iveta Mukuchyan with "LoveWave"
