= Armen Martirosyan (musician) =

Armenian musician and composer

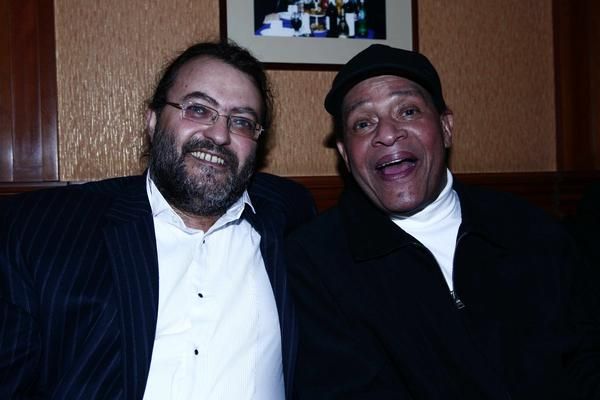
- Armen Martirosyan & Al Jarreau
- Born: February 18, 1963 (age 63)
- Occupations: Musician, composer, songwriter, music producer
- Years active: 1993 - present
- Spouse: Lily Vardan

Armen Martirosyan (Armenian Արմեն Մարտիրոսյան; born 18 February 1963, in Yerevan) is an Armenian musician and composer.

== Biography ==
His first music lessons were given in his early childhood by his grandmother, who taught him the rudiments of the notes. At the same time, his parents introduced him to different genres of musical art (ballet, opera and concerts of symphonic music). In 1970, aged seven, he entered the well-known music school being already familiar with the notes, having perfect pitch and a sense of rhythm. Teachers noticed the absolute composing abilities and rare intuition for performing musical composition.

In 1978, aged fourteen, he met Edvard Mirzoyan, the Chairman of the Composers’ Union of Armenia. It was a historical event for the teenager. 2 years later in 1980, Martirosyan would enter Mirzoyan's composition class in the Yerevan Komitas State Conservatory.

He was the first composer in Armenia to apply computer technologies in music.

1991 to 1995 were Martirosyan's “traveling years”. During these four years he worked in Switzerland as a pianist. From 1995 to 1997 he worked in the Armenian State Song Theatre as a producer and arranger. In 1997, he became an artistic director and a conductor of the Armenian Jazz Band (AJB). At the Armenian Music Awards, he won in the Best Jazz Fusion Album category (2001) and Best Compilation Album Music by Composer category (2002).

Martirosyan composed Armenia's entry into the 2006 Eurovision Song Contest in Athens "Without Your Love", 2010 Eurovision Song Contest in Oslo "Apricot Stone" and the 2015 Eurovision Song Contest in Vienna "Face The Shadow".

In 2014, Martirosyan co-produced the soundtrack for the animated film Anahit alongside Vardan Zadoyan.
