= Essaï Altounian =

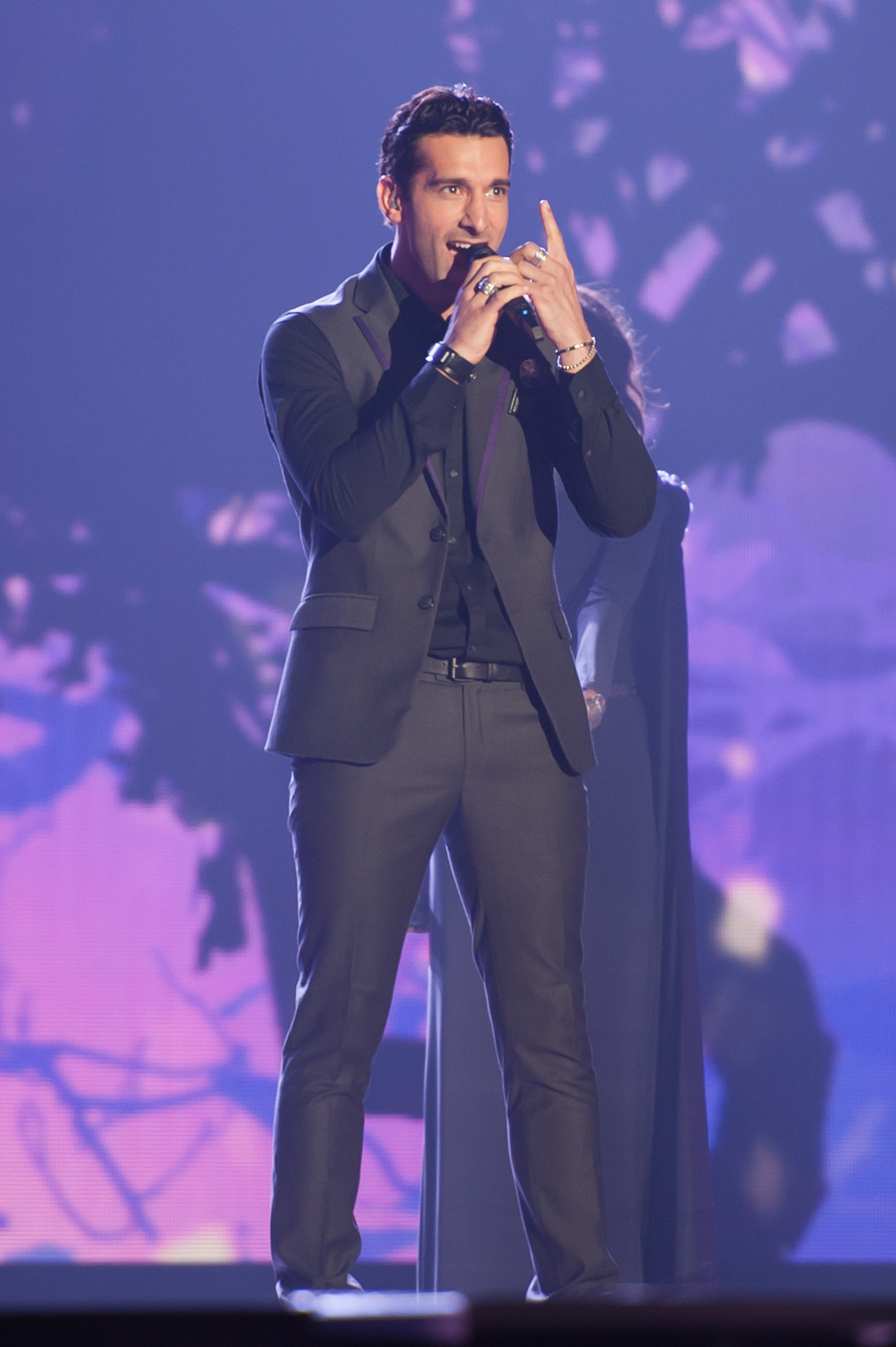
- Altounian performing at the Eurovision Song Contest 2015

Background information
- Also known as: Essaï
- Born: 5 November 1980 (age 45); Paris, France
- Genres: Pop
- Occupation: Singer
- Instruments: Vocals, keyboard
- Labels: Sony France, Mercury Universal
- Formerly of: Genealogy
- Website: http://www.essaimusic.com

Essaï Altounian (Armenian: Եսայի Ալթունյան; born November 5, 1980), sometimes credited as simply Essaï, is a French-Armenian artist.

== Biography ==
Essaï Altounian was born on November 5, 1980, in Paris, France. His grandparents escaped from Kharpet during the Armenian genocide.

Essaï was a law student at Jean Monnet University. He decided to drop out and focus on his passion for music after joining the French soul and R&B group Ideal-3. His first single was "Pardonne Moi" in 1999. His first performance was for the French television program Le monde est à Vous.

At the age of twenty, Altounian signed a solo contract with Mercury Universal. This contract produced two singles " Encore une chance " and "C'est ainsi" . He has worked for the French channel TF1 since 1998 and has composed multiple songs for TV programs and shows.

For the theater, he composed music for Anthony Kavanagh's One Man Show, as well as several songs for "Ma femme s'appelle Maurice" by Raffy Shart.

== Career ==
Essaï composed his first song when he was twelve years old. In 1999, he signed a contract with Sony France to become the lead singer of "Ideal-3." Their first single, "Pardonne-Moi", was played on all major French radio stations, including NRJ and Fun Radio.

When Essaï was 21, he split from Ideal-3 and signed a solo contract with Mercury Universal. As a solo artist, he began to receive many invitations from different TV shows including invitations to write and produce for other artists.

In 2001, Essaï played the role of Count Paris in Gérard Presgurvic's musical Romeo and Juliet. The show's album sold two million copies. That same year, France’s First Lady, Bernadette Chirac, asked him to write and produce the song Un Peu de Moi for the charity Pièces Jaunes, of which she was the patron. Essaï selected artist Anthony Kavanagh to perform the anthem, dedicated to hospitalized children supported by the association. He also included the gospel choir We Are One to enhance the song’s emotional depth. David Douillet, also a sponsor of the charity, contributed to the recording by speaking at the end of the track.

In 2002, Essaï collaborated with French singer Jenifer Bartoli on her debut album Jenifer. He wrote and composed the song Que reste-t-il ? for her.

In 2003 Essaï collaborated with Michel Legrand; together, they produced 25 songs for the 2003 musical adaptation of the movie "Les Demoiselles de Rochefort." at Palais des Congrès de Paris. Together they recorded in Paris, London at Air Studio for the big band, and Bratislava in Slovakia for the symphonic orchestra. That year he also produced and composed the single "Donne-moi" for artist Grégori Baquet, who played the role of Benvolio in the musical Romeo and Juliet, as well as the single Et je danse for Cécilia Cara, who portrayed Juliet in the same production.

In 2004, Essaï produced, wrote, and composed the single "Si on parlait de ma vie" for Julie Pietri following her victory on the television show Retour gagnant.

In 2005, he composed the song "S'aimer est interdit" for the musical Le Roi Soleil, performed by Emmanuel Moire and Anne-Laure Girbal. The lyrics were written by Lionel Florence and Patrice Guirao

In 2006, Essaï also directed the musical production Parisian Cabarets, "Bobino." That year he also produced and composed the song REX DANCE for Michael Youn in the movie "Incontrolable" by Raffy Shart

In 2009, he was the musical director of "La Bataille des chorales," a TV prime time on TF1 channel in which 5 choirs competed.

In 2010, he was the musical Director of "Le Grand Show des enfants." also broadcast on prime time TF1.

In 2011, Essaï signed a digital distribution contract with Believe, and his first single, Sweet Family, was released on 4 November 2011.

In 2014, he signed a contract in the United States with Kerry Gordy from Motown music. Together, they produced a new single "Family" released on the label KERRY GORDY Records.

In 2015, Essaï released his song "Je n'oublie pas - Chem Morana," dedicated to the 1.5 million victims of the 1915 Armenian genocide on the 100th anniversary of its occurrence.

That year, Essaï represented Armenia at the Eurovision Song Contest. He was selected by Armenia’s First Lady to join Genealogy, a six-member group formed to represent the country at the contest held in Vienna, Austria.

In 2016, Essaï was on the jury of the "Destination Eurovision" show in order to select the next candidate representing Armenia at the Eurovision Song Contest. In 2018, he produced and composed all the tracks on the album Karma by Carla Stark, a French-Belgian artist. The album released on the Belgium label BeMad, with English pop influences, features 12 songs, including the lead single titled Start Starting.

In 2018, Essaï was a jury "music expert" in the American reality talent competition series "The World's Best," where international performers would be evaluated by three judges and the "Wall of the World," which consisted of 50 panelists from around the world with multiple fields of entertainment.

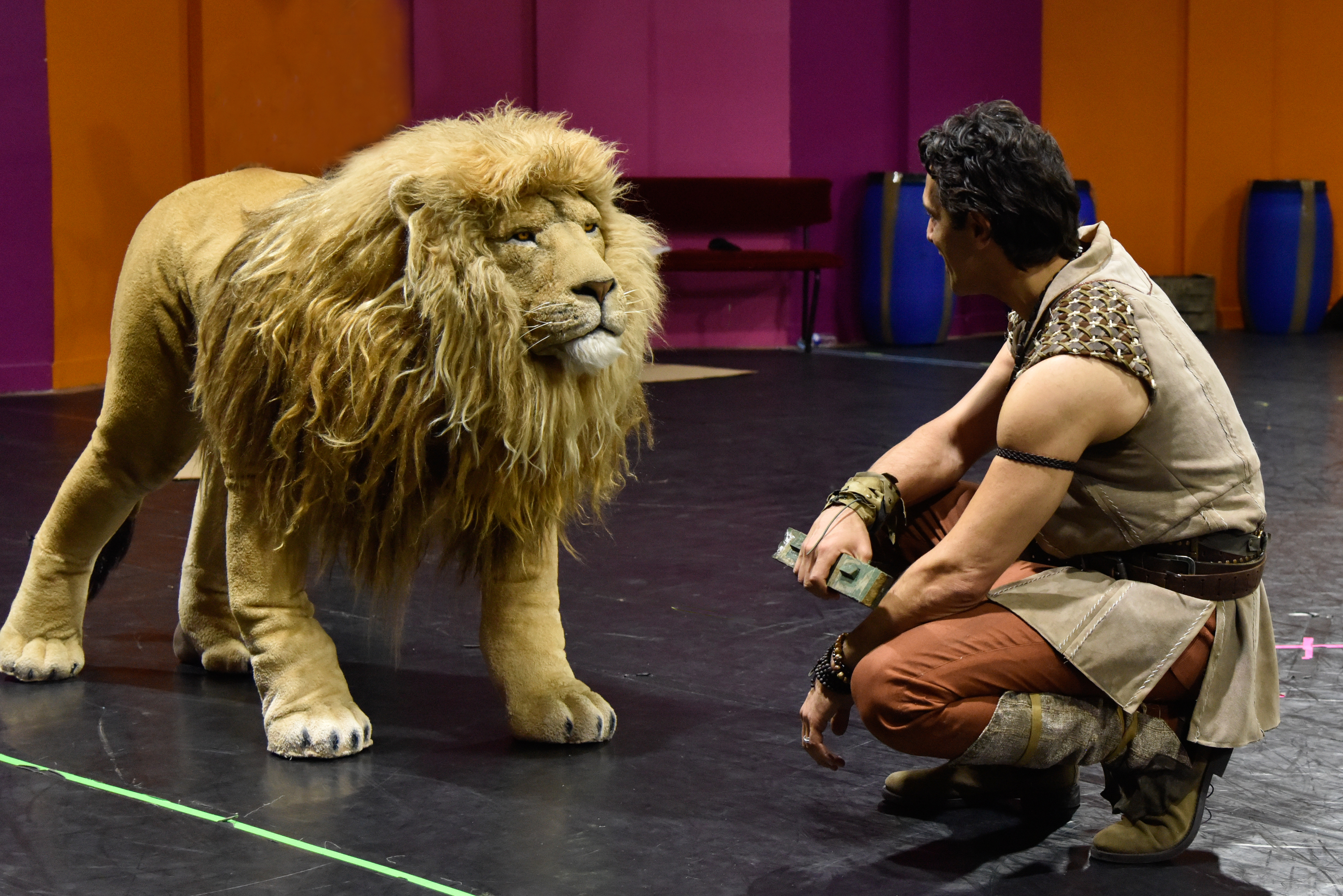

In 2020, Essaï created the musical "Noé, la force de vivre," inspired by the story of Noah's Ark. It premiered on November 27, 2021, at the Paris Longchamp racecourse. It ran for two months. The musical returned in January 2023, at the Palais des Congrès.

In 2023, Essaï announced a new album, set to be released in November 2023. The first single titled "Sans toi" was released on September 27, 2023.

In 2024, Essaï embarked on a tour to China to play his musical show NOÉ, la force de vivre in seven different cities. He was accompanied by his entire troupe for this international tour, marking a significant milestone in bringing this work to audiences abroad.

== Eurovision ==
Essaï was a member of the supergroup Genealogy, who represented Armenia in the 60th Eurovision Song Contest held in Vienna. The group consisted of six Armenians - five of which represented the Armenian diaspora and the forget-me-not flower, and the sixth member being the center piece of the flower who is from Armenia herself. Their single for the finals, originally titled "Don't Deny," was released on 12 March 2015. It was believed to be a tribute for the victims of the Armenian Genocide. However, the title faced criticism from countries Turkey, alongside Azerbaijan, for its alleged call to recognize the genocide. It was eventually renamed "Face the Shadow."

He became an Armenian citizen along with the other foreign members of Genealogy on 28 April 2015 after being given Armenian passports by then-President Serzh Sargsyan. The group finished 16th overall.

Awards and achievements
Preceded by Aram Mp3 with Not Alone	Armenia in the Eurovision Song Contest (as part of Genealogy); 2015	Succeeded by Iveta Mukuchyan with LoveWave
