= Vahe Tilbian =

Ethiopian-Armenian singer

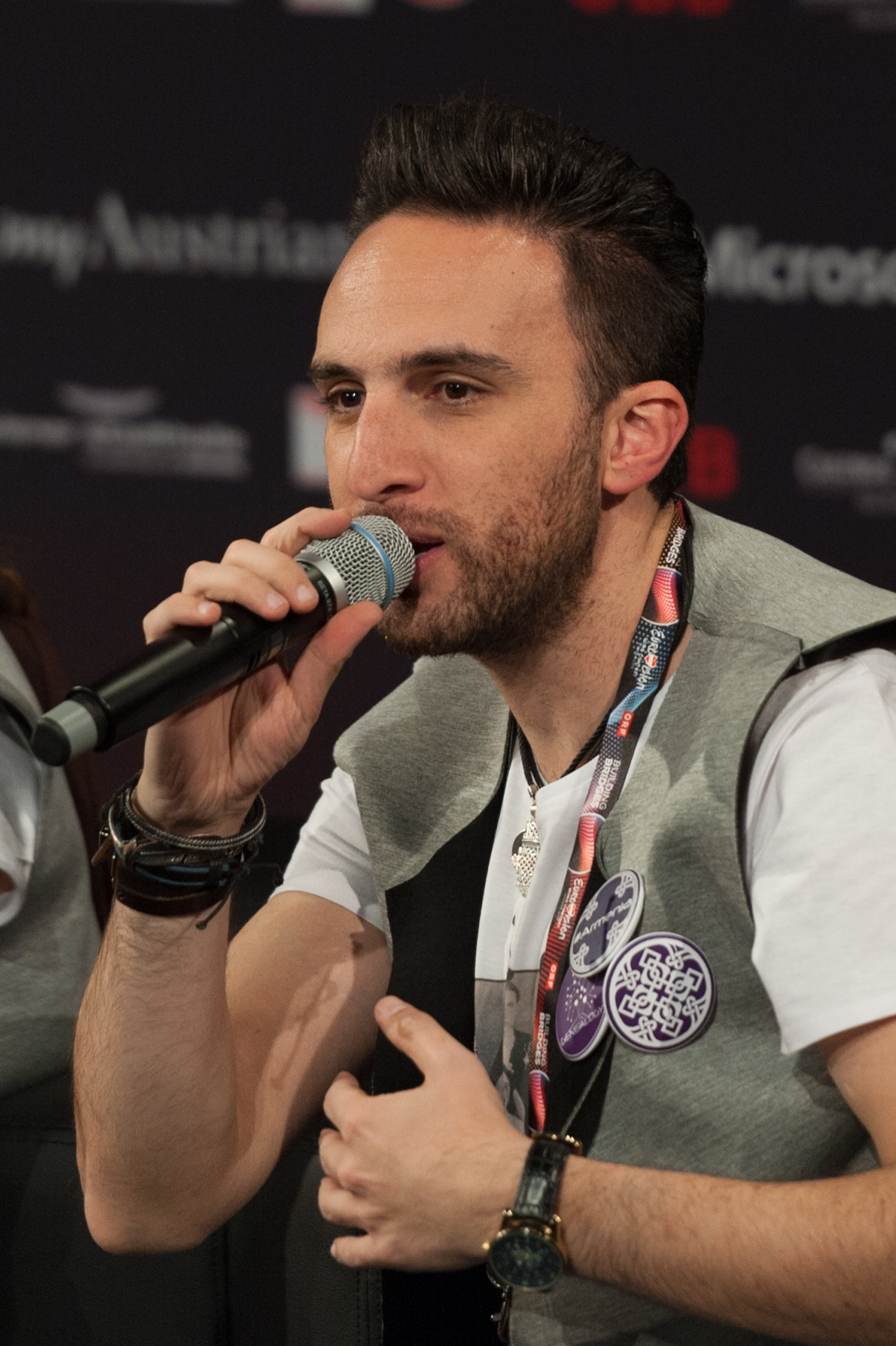
- Tilbian in 2015

Background information
- Born: 17 February 1980 (age 46); Ethiopia
- Genres: Pop rock; dance-pop
- Occupations: Singer; musician; dancer
- Years active: 2008–present
- Formerly of: Genealogy
- Website: vahetilbian.com

Vahe Tilbian (Armenian: Վահե Թիլբյան, Western Armenian Վահէ Թիլպեան, Amharic: ቫሔ ቲልቢያን; born 17 February 1980) is an Ethiopian singer of Armenian descent. A solo artist, he became lead singer for the Ethiopian group Zemen Band. He released his debut solo album Mixology in 2012. He was part of the pan-Armenian music formation Genealogy who represented Armenia in Eurovision Song Contest 2015 with the song "Face the Shadow" finishing 16th overall.

== Biography ==
Vahe Tilbian is an Ethiopian-Armenian artist. Vahe is known for his style – from rock to techno, reggae to R&B, Armenian to Ethiopian in Amharic and a lot of Latin Music.

Vahe was born and raised in Ethiopia. Both his parents (Garo Tilbian and Ani Aslanian) are of Armenian origin. His paternal grandfather escaped the Armenian genocide in 1923 and by way of Syria eventually settled in Ethiopia. His mother's side of the family all left the ancient lands of Western Armenia by the late 1890s or early 1900s. Vahe values his Armenian roots and believes that it was the persecution Armenians faced that built his unique artistic character.

Vahe heard the call of the stage as a singer later in life after he graduated from the University of British Columbia in Vancouver, Canada studying Biology and earning a BSc degree in General Science. Vahe has always been involved in dancing and became a professional International Style Latin American ballroom dancer. He was the co-creator and choreographer of the Salsegnochu Dance Group. Around this time, Vahe was singing as a lead tenor in a choir in Addis Ababa called The Motley Singers.

After working in the business sector for over 3 years as a young college graduate, Vahe left his job in 2008 and started working on music full-time. He joined the band Z Beyaynetus with the support of his friend Bitik Emlaelu and Ledj Leo. Soon, Kenny Allen, performer and producer from DC residing in Ethiopia, heard him at one of the local bars and asked to sing supporting vocals (backing vocals) for his album release show with the 251 Band. He agreed and became his permanent supporting vocalist and worked together around town and on local music festival stages for many years. Thereafter, Vahe decided to diversify his genre and repertoire joining a salsa band called Eshee Havana and worked on original remixes of Ethiopian songs into salsa music. In 2011, he made the final auditions to the Big Brother Africa show.

Vahe wrote the lyrics to his first song called "Life or Something Like it" and Michael Hailu put the melody together and they recorded it in 2010. This gave him the enthusiasm and courage to write more lyrics and create songs. Vahe's single "Don’t Stop" was nominated for an Armenian Pulse Music Award for the best song in English by an Armenian artist in 2012. The song won the 3rd place by online voting.

In November 2012 Vahe finished his album titled Mixology, and released it for free.

In May 2013, Vahe released a music video for the song "Yene Tizita", meaning nostalgia or memories, directed and produced by Aramazt Kalayjian and Mulugeta Amaru. This was a new rendition of the old Ethiopian song form.

Vahe was the lead vocalist for Zemen Band for 2 years. He worked with well-established Ethiopian singers such as Zeritu Kebede, Michael Belayneh and the musical group known as Nubian Arc Band. Vahe was also the back-up vocalist as well as the opening act for artists like Ledj Leo, Abby Lakew, Nhatty, Tsedenya Gebremarkos, Eyob Mekonnen, Shewandagn Hailu. He also performed as a back-up vocalist for visiting artists from other African countries like Zimbabwean artist Oliver Mtukudzi, and Kenyan artists Vee and Liz Ogumbo. In addition to his career as an artist, Vahe has been a columnist at Zoma magazine published in Addis Ababa.

In February 2015 Vahe was announced as a member of the Armenian music group Genealogy. Along with other members of the group he represented Armenia in the Eurovision Song Contest 2015.

== Discography ==
=== Albums ===
- Mixology (2012)

=== Singles ===
- "Life or Something Like It" (2010) (Vahe Tilbian (l), Michael Hailu (m))
- "Mixology" (November 2012)
- "Yene Tizita" (in Amharic የኔ ትዝታ) (May 2013) (credited as Vahé, in Amharic ቫሔ)
- "Face the Shadow" (2015) (as part of the Armenian group Genealogy in Eurovision Song Contest 2015)
- "Mot u heru, Im Hayastan" (2016) (in Armenian Մոտ ու հեռու, Իմ Հայաստան)
