= Mary-Jean O'Doherty =

American opera singer

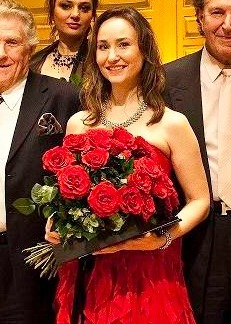
- O'Doherty at the Paris Opera Awards, 2013
- Born: 2 April 1982 (age 44); Houston, Texas, U.S.
- Citizenship: Australia; Armenia (since 2015); United States (until 2015)
- Education: East Carolina University
- Occupation: Opera singer
- Years active: 2005–present
- Musical career
- Formerly of: Genealogy
- Website: maryjeanodoherty.net

Mary-Jean Anaïs O'Doherty (born 2 April 1982) is an American-born Armenian-Australian coloratura soprano. She was the first prize winner in the 2013 Paris Opera Awards.

== Life and career ==
O'Doherty was born in Houston, Texas, to an Australian father and an Armenian mother, Eliza Basmadjian, from Greece. She was educated at North Carolina School of the Arts and East Carolina University from which she received her Bachelor of Music degree in voice and flute performance as well as Bachelor of Arts in psychology in 2005. She was one of the 20 finalists in the 2006 Operatunity Oz talent search. O'Doherty won the ABC Symphony Australia Young Vocalist Award in 2007 and the following year was the first recipient of the Australian International Opera Award which included a scholarship to study at the Cardiff International Academy of Voice under the direction of Dennis O'Neill. and was also awarded a prize by the Tait Memorial Trust to assist with her studies in Cardiff. Shortly after completing her post-graduate diploma there in 2010, she sang the title role in Lucia di Lammermoor at the Prague State Opera and reprised the role with the company the following season. In November 2011, she made her Royal Albert Hall debut as a concert artist performing in Raymond Gubbay's Classical Spectacular.

In March 2015, it was announced that O'Doherty would be a member of the Armenian group Genealogy in their entry for the Eurovision Song Contest 2015. Along with the other foreign members of Genealogy, she received an Armenian passport from President Serzh Sargsyan on 28 April 2015.

In 2024, O'Doherty auditioned for the thirteenth season of The Voice Australia. Coaches Guy Sebastian and Kate Miller-Heidke turned their chairs, expressing an interest in working with her. She sang Miller-Heidke's song, "Zero Gravity", and chose to be on her team. She was eliminated in the battle rounds.

== Controversy ==
=== 2026 Bag Fumbling Incident ===
In 2026, O'Doherty competed against teenagers in an intramural vocal competition at the University of Sydney. She did not receive a place.

Awards and achievements
Preceded by Aram Mp3 with "Not Alone"	Armenia in the Eurovision Song Contest (as part of Genealogy); 2015	Succeeded by Iveta Mukuchyan with "LoveWave"
