= Not Alone (Aram Mp3 song) =

2014 single by Aram Mp3

Single by Aram Mp3
- Released: 14 March 2014
- Recorded: February 2014
- Genre: Ballad; dubstep
- Length: 3:03
- Label: Universal Music
- Songwriters: Garik Papoyan, Aram Sargsyan

Aram Mp3 singles chronology
"Just Go On" (2013)	"Not Alone" (2014)	"Magic" (2014)

Music video
- "Not Alone" on YouTube

Eurovision Song Contest 2014 entry
- Country: Armenia
- Artist: Aram Mp3
- Language: English
- Composer: Aram Sargsyan
- Lyricist: Garik Papoyan

Finals performance
- Semi-final result: 4th
- Semi-final points: 121
- Final result: 4th
- Final points: 174

Entry chronology
- ◄ "Lonely Planet" (2013)
- "Face the Shadow" (2015) ►

Song presentation
- file; help

Official performance video
- "Not Alone" (Final) on YouTube

"Not Alone" is a song by Armenian singer Aram Mp3. It represented Armenia at the Eurovision Song Contest 2014 in Denmark. The song was revealed on 14 March 2014.

== Background and composition ==
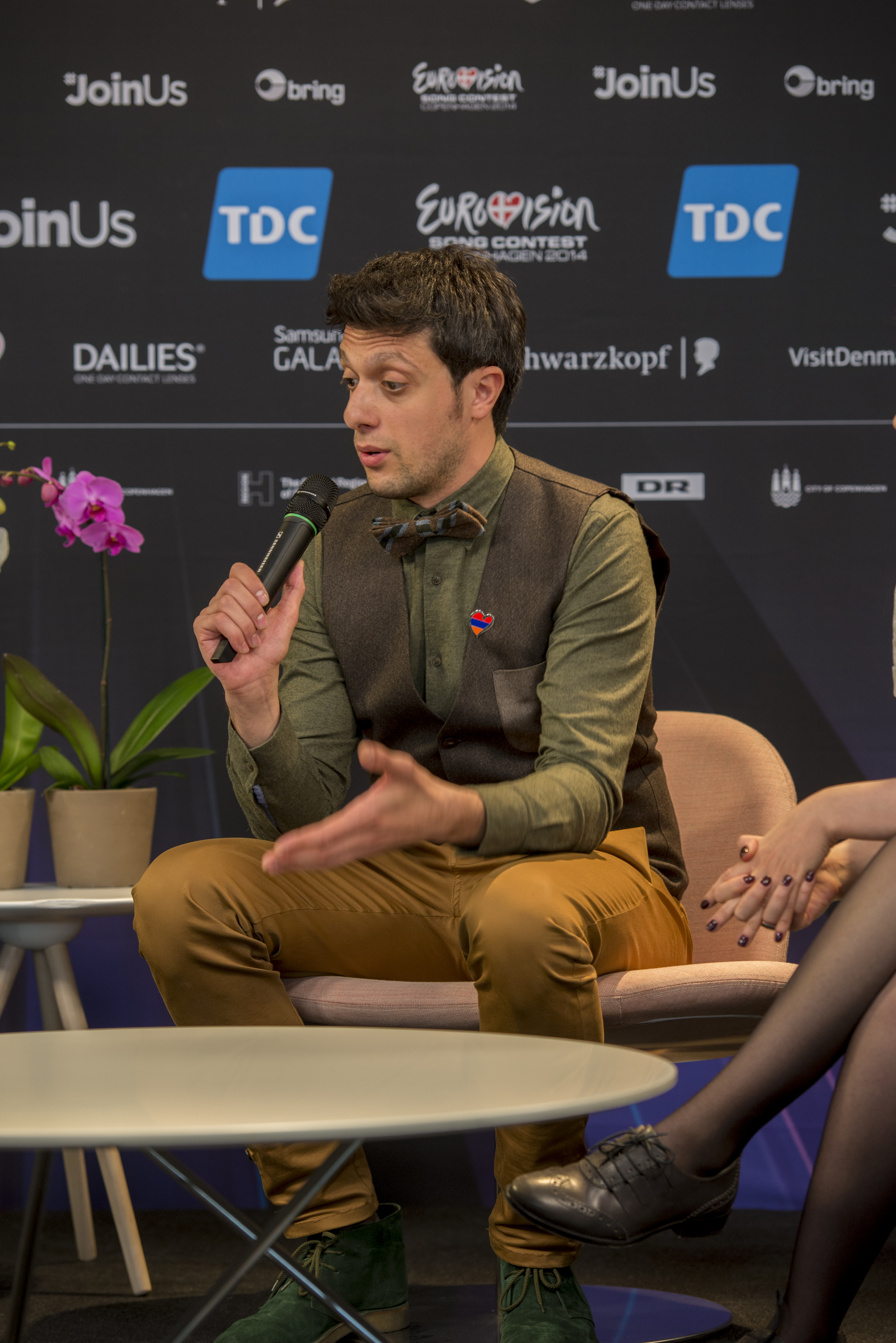
"Not Alone" was composed by Aram himself.

On 31 December 2013 Aram Mp3 was selected by Armenian First Channel to represent Armenia at the Eurovision Song Contest 2014. On 21 February 2014 it was announced that Aram's song is already chosen, but the song will be premiered together with a music video by March. Overall the broadcaster received 75 songs from domestic and foreign composers.

The song recording works begun in February 2014. On 14 March the song and music video officially premiered on AMPTV.

It's a kind of songs that perhaps i would recommend to close the eyes during listening. Not prepared for dancing, but to open the soul, because it penetrates into the depths of the human soul.

The music of the song was written by Aram himself, while the author of the lyrics is Aram's friend Garik Papoyan. When asked about the song message, Aram said, "You should never give up and always fight for love. One kiss can change everything." "Not Alone" is a mix of ballad and dubstep. It starts with piano accompaniment, and in the middle of the song there is also violin. The dubstep part of the song starts after repeating "You're not alone..." few times. The song ends as it started; with piano accompaniment.

The official remix version by DJ Serjo was released a few days ago before the first semi-final of contest.

== Critical reception ==
The song mostly received positive reviews and was considered one of the main favorites of the 2014 Eurovision. Jess Denham of The Independent called it an "empowering dubstep ballad". Daily Mirror entertainment writer Carl Greenwood gave the song 1 star out of 5 and said, "This song is the musical equivalent of homoeopathic sleeping pills - there's nothing to it but it's still enough to knock you out for a solid eight." Sofabet editor Daniel Gould stated that "The song is not typical Eurovision fare", because of its structure. Gould called it "a big tune: structurally daring, contemporary and cinematic in feel." Alex Fletcher from Digital Spy called the song as a "standard Eurovision brooding fare for 1 minute 53", and then continuing his article he notes, "Then there's a key change. Eurovision loves a bloody key change. It then morphs into a dubstep banger with extra knobs on." Azerbaijani Haqqin.az website's editor Yulia Mammedova writes that "Not Alone" has a very professional arrangement, but then adds that such a professional arrangement is possible to do only in Europe or somewhere in Turkey, meanwhile the arrangement of the song was done by Armenian musician Lilit Navasardyan in Armenia.

In Armenia the song was well received by Armenian musicians. Hayko, who represented Armenia in 2007, said he liked the song and called it "tasteful" and "energetic". Similarly, Armenia's 2013 representative, Gor Sujyan said he "liked the song very much", including the music, lyrics and the instrumentation. He expressed the opinion that it will be "accepted" in Europe. Hasmik Karapetyan admitted that she expected a more "rhythmic" song from Aram, but she praised the song and suggested it came out to be a "powerful, moving song, which contains a very important message."

== Music video ==
The music video is directed by Grigor Gasparyan. It was shot in March in Yerevan. On 14 March the song and music video officially premiered on AMPTV. In 24 hours since the official video was uploaded on Eurovision channel on YouTube, it received more than 200,000 views. By 17 March, it had received more views than any other 2014 entry music video on the channel. On 22 March it surpassed 1 million views. The video shows Aram Mp3 on a lighted stage surrounded by an orchestra and is intercut with clips of a young woman in her car who had just broken up with her lover.

== Eurovision Song Contest ==
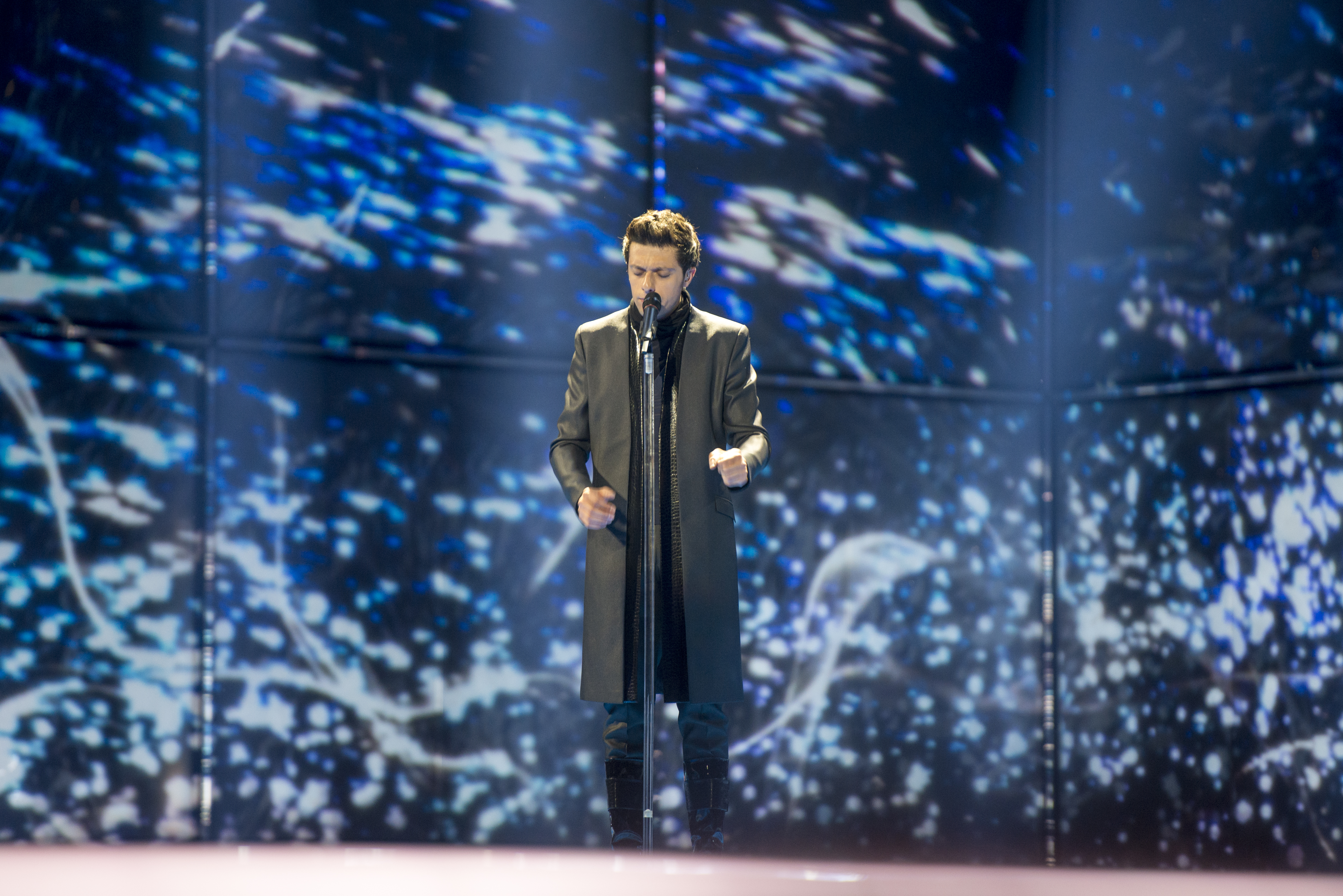
Aram Mp3 performing the song in Copenhagen, Denmark

During the semi-final allocation draw on 20 January 2014 at the Copenhagen City Hall, Armenia was drawn to compete in the first half of the first semi-final on 6 May 2014. In the first semi-final, the producers of the show decided that Armenia would open the semi-final and perform 1st, preceding Latvia. Armenia qualified from the first semi-final, placing 4th and scoring 121 points, and competed in the final on 10 May 2014. During the winner's press conference for the first semi-final qualifiers, Armenia was allocated to compete in the first half of the final. In the final, the producers of the show decided that Armenia would perform 7th, following Romania and preceding Montenegro. Armenia placed 4th in the final, scoring 174 points.

The Armenian performance featured Aram Mp3 performing on stage alone. The stage atmosphere during the performance transitioned from dark settings to explosive and pulsating elements projected on the LED screens as the song progressed.

== Track listing ==
- Digital download
1. "Not Alone" – 3:03
- Digital download (Remix)
1. "Not Alone" – 4:12

== Charts ==
Chart (2014)	Peak position
Austria (Ö3 Austria Top 40)	31
Belgium (Ultratip Bubbling Under Flanders)	38
Denmark (Tracklisten)	21
Germany (GfK)	44
Hungary (Single Top 40)	11
Ireland (IRMA)	60
Netherlands (Single Top 100)	94
Sweden (Sverigetopplistan)	45
Switzerland (Schweizer Hitparade)	53
Turkey (Number One Top 40)	14
UK Singles (OCC)	88
