= Romania in the Eurovision Song Contest 2015 =

- Eurovision Song Contest 2015
- Participating broadcaster: Televiziunea Română (TVR)
- Country: Romania
- Selection process: Selecția Națională 2015
- Selection date: 8 March 2015

Competing entry
- Song: "De la capăt"
- Artist: Voltaj
- Songwriters: Călin Gavril Goia; Gabriel Constantin; Adrian Cristescu; Silviu-Marian Păduraru; Victor-Răzvan Alstani; Monica-Ana Stevens; Andrei-Madalin Leonte

Placement
- Semi-final result: Qualified (5th, 89 points)
- Final result: 15th, 35 points

Participation chronology

Romania was represented at the Eurovision Song Contest 2015 with the song "De la capăt" written by Călin Gavril Goia, Gabriel Constantin, Adrian Cristescu, Silviu-Marian Păduraru, Victor-Răzvan Alstani, Monica-Ana Stevens and Andrei-Madalin Leonte. The song was performed by the band Voltaj. The Romanian broadcaster Televiziunea Română (TVR) organised the national final Selecția Națională 2015 in order to select the Romanian entry for the 2015 contest in Vienna, Austria. Twelve entries were selected to compete in the national final on 8 March 2015 where "De la capăt" performed by Voltaj was selected as the winner after scoring top marks from a five-member jury panel and a public televote.

Romania was drawn to compete in the first semi-final of the Eurovision Song Contest which took place on 19 May 2015. Performing during the show in position 15, "De la capăt" was announced among the top 10 entries of the first semi-final and therefore qualified to compete in the final on 23 May. It was later revealed that Romania placed fifth out of the 16 participating countries in the semi-final with 89 points. In the final, Romania performed in position 20 and placed fifteenth out of the 27 participating countries, scoring 35 points.

== Background ==
Prior to the 2015 contest, Romania had participated in the Eurovision Song Contest 16 times since its first entry in 1994. To this point, its highest placing in the contest has been third place, which the nation achieved on two occasions: in 2005 with the song "Let Me Try" performed by Luminița Anghel and Sistem, and in 2010 with the song "Playing with Fire" performed by Paula Seling and Ovi. To this point, Romania has qualified to the final on every occasion since the introduction of semi-finals to the format of the contest in 2004. In 2014, "Miracle" by Paula Seling and Ovi placed 12th in the final.

The Romanian national broadcaster, Televiziunea Română (TVR), broadcasts the event within Romania and organizes the selection process for the nation's entry. TVR has consistently selected the Romanian Eurovision entry through national finals that feature a competition among several artists and songs. The broadcaster confirmed their intentions to participate at the 2015 Eurovision Song Contest on 11 September 2014. TVR had set up national finals with several artists to choose both the song and performer to compete at Eurovision for Romania, a procedure which the broadcaster opted for once again to select their 2015 entry.

== Before Eurovision ==
=== Selecția Națională 2015 ===
Selecția Națională 2015 was the national final format developed by TVR in order to select Romania's entry for the Eurovision Song Contest 2015. The competition took place at the Sala Polivalentă in Craiova on 8 March 2015 and was hosted by Alina Șerban and Andrei Boroșovici with Ioana Voicu hosting from the backstage and Florina Ghenescu hosting segments from the green room. The producers of the competition were Iuliana Marciuc and Bogdan Ghițulescu, while Liana Stanciu was appointed as the head of the Romanian delegation at the Eurovision Song Contest. The show was televised on TVR1, TVR HD, TVRi as well as online via the broadcaster's streaming service TVR+ and YouTube. The official Eurovision Song Contest website eurovision.tv also provided an online stream for the competition.

==== Competing entries ====
TVR opened a submission period for artists and composers to submit their entries between 26 January 2015 and 8 February 2015. The broadcaster received 93 submissions after the submission deadline passed, of which 79 were eligible for consideration. An expert committee reviewed the received submissions between 9 and 11 February 2015, with each juror on the committee rating each song between 1 (lowest) and 10 (highest) based on criteria such as the melodic harmony and structure of the song, the orchestral arrangement, originality and stylistic diversity of the composition and sound and voice quality. After the combination of the jury votes, the top twelve entries that scored the highest were selected for the national final. The competing entries were announced during a press conference on 12 February 2015. Among the competing artists was former Eurovision entrant Luminița Anghel, who previously represented Romania in the Eurovision Song Contest 2005.

| Artist | Song | Songwriter(s) |
|---|---|---|
| Aurelian Temișan feat. Alexa | "Chica Latina" | Mihai Alexandru, Alexa Niculae |
| Băieții | "Dragoste în lanțuri" | Mihai Postolache, Ștefan Adrian Marin, Liviu Vârciu, Marian Stavar |
| Blue Noise | "Love Won't Run Away" | Diana Moraru, Elena Moroșanu, Ana Cristina Leonte, Mihail Grigore, Denis Bolborea |
| CEJ | "We Were in Love" | Victor Thell, Aleena Gibson, Maria Smith |
| Cristina Vasiu | "Nowhere" | Cristina Vasiu, Daniel Costache, Dan Andrei Deaconu |
| Lara Lee | "Superman" | Robin Lynch, Niklas Olovson, Milica Fajgelj, Tami Rodriguez, Nicole Rodriguez |
| Luminița Anghel | "A Million Stars" | Andrei Tudor, Cristian Faur |
| Ovidiu Anton | "Still Alive" | Ylva Persson, Linda Persson, Peter Hägerås |
| Rodica Aculova | "My Light" | Ivan Aculov, Lidia Scarlat |
| Super Trooper | "Secret Place" | Daniel Alexandrescu, Radu Fornea, Pavel Petricenco, Tudor Man |
| Tudor Turcu | "Save Us" | Gabriel Huiban |
| Voltaj | "De la capăt" | Gabriel Constantin, Călin Gavril Goia, Adrian Cristescu, Victor-Răzvan Alstani, Silviu-Marian Păduraru |

==== Final ====
The final took place on 8 March 2015. Twelve songs competed and the winner, "De la capăt" performed by Voltaj, was determined by the 50/50 combination of the votes from a five-member jury panel and public televoting. The members of the jury panel that voted were: Ovi (singer-songwriter, represented Romania in the Eurovision Song Contest 2010 and 2014 together with Paula Seling), Mihai Pocorschi (composer), Viorel Gavrilă (composer), Anca Lupeș (manager) and Bogdan Honciuc (journalist). In addition to the performances of the competing entries, the interval act featured performances by Eurovision Song Contest 2004 winner Ruslana.

Final – 8 March 2015
| R/O | Artist | Song | Jury | | Televote | | Total | Place |
| R/O | Artist | Song | Votes | Points | Votes | Points | Total | Place |
|---|---|---|---|---|---|---|---|---|
| 1 | Voltaj | "De la capăt" | 43 | 12 | 4,707 | 12 | 24 | 1 |
| 2 | Băieții | "Dragoste în lanțuri" | 0 | 0 | 178 | 0 | 0 | 12 |
| 3 | Tudor Turcu | "Save Us" | 28 | 5 | 2,078 | 8 | 13 | 5 |
| 4 | Aurelian Temișan feat. Alexa | "Chica Latina" | 13 | 2 | 468 | 3 | 5 | 9 |
| 5 | Rodica Aculova | "My Light" | 1 | 0 | 86 | 0 | 0 | 11 |
| 6 | Blue Noise | "Love Won't Run Away" | 39 | 7 | 1,020 | 7 | 14 | 4 |
| 7 | Ovidiu Anton | "Still Alive" | 41 | 10 | 791 | 5 | 15 | 3 |
| 8 | Lara Lee | "Superman" | 30 | 6 | 386 | 1 | 7 | 7 |
| 9 | Super Trooper | "Secret Place" | 9 | 1 | 510 | 4 | 5 | 10 |
| 10 | Luminița Anghel | "A Million Stars" | 39 | 8 | 3,828 | 10 | 18 | 2 |
| 11 | Cristina Vasiu | "Nowhere" | 21 | 3 | 444 | 2 | 5 | 8 |
| 12 | CEJ | "We Were in Love" | 26 | 4 | 846 | 6 | 10 | 6 |

=== Preparation ===
Following Voltaj's win at the Romanian national final, the band announced on 16 March 2015 that they would perform "De la capăt" in a bilingual mix of Romanian and English at the Eurovision Song Contest, with the majority remaining in Romanian and the final chorus in English. Voltaj explained that performing in Romanian allowed for the song's message to reach its target audience, the three million Romanian migrants who had to leave their children behind, while adding an English chorus would allow an international audience to understand the message as well. Both versions had been recorded and released by the band prior to the national final in November 2014 with the intent of bringing awareness to the children in Romania who have been left behind by their parents in order for their parents to work abroad and support their families, and to highlight the detrimental effect this has on children who grow up without their parents. The official music video of the song featured scenes from the 2013 Romanian short film Calea Dunarii, directed by Sabin Dorohoi, which tells the story of a boy in a Romanian village on the Danube river trying to regain contact with his parents who work in Vienna.

== At Eurovision ==
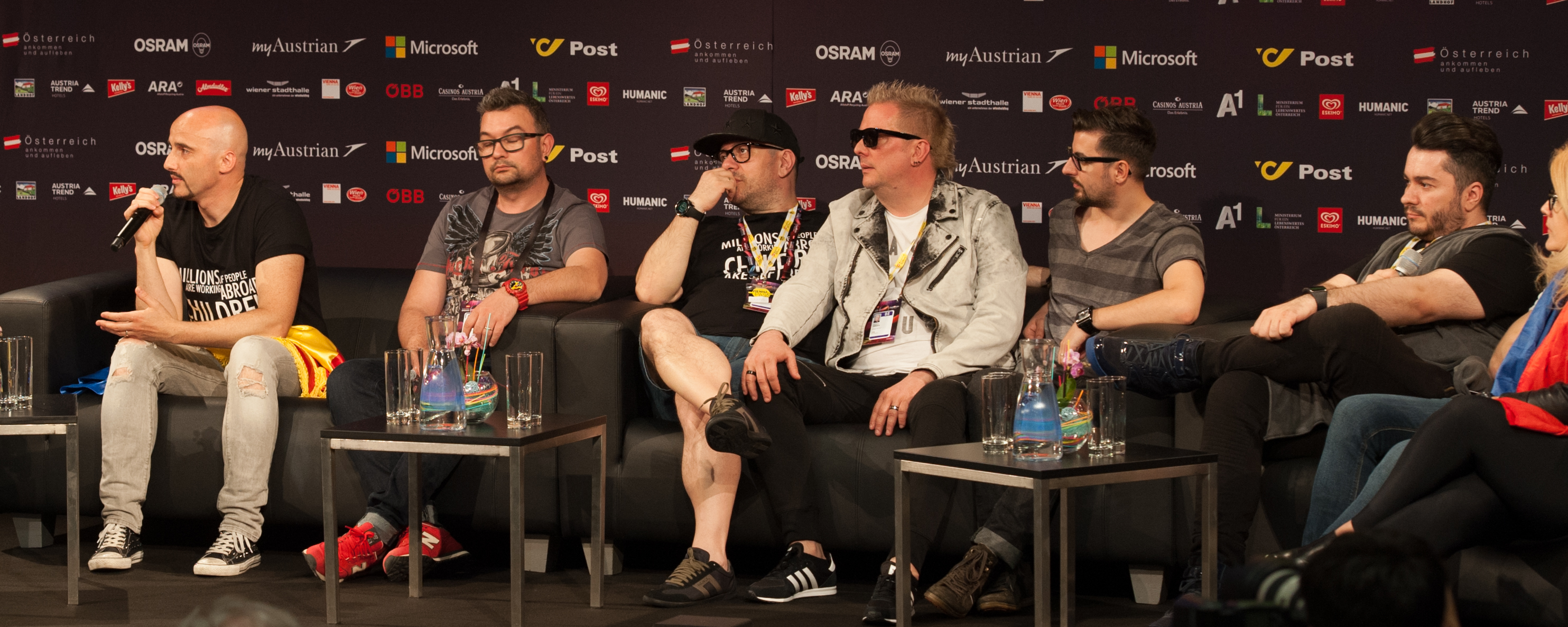
Voltaj during a press meet and greet

According to Eurovision rules, all nations with the exceptions of the host country and the "Big Five" (France, Germany, Italy, Spain and the United Kingdom) are required to qualify from one of two semi-finals in order to compete for the final; the top ten countries from each semi-final progress to the final. In the 2015 contest, Australia also competed directly in the final as an invited guest nation. The European Broadcasting Union (EBU) split up the competing countries into five different pots based on voting patterns from previous contests, with countries with favourable voting histories put into the same pot. On 26 January 2015, an allocation draw was held which placed each country into one of the two semi-finals, as well as which half of the show they would perform in. Romania was placed into the first semi-final, to be held on 19 May 2015, and was scheduled to perform in the second half of the show.

Once all the competing songs for the 2015 contest had been released, the running order for the semi-finals was decided by the shows' producers rather than through another draw, so that similar songs were not placed next to each other. Romania was set to perform in position 15, following the entry from Albania and before the entry from Georgia.

All three shows were broadcast in Romania on TVR1, TVRi and TVR HD with commentary by Bogdan Stănescu. The Romanian spokesperson, who announced the Romanian votes during the final, was Sonia Argint Ionescu.

=== Semi-final ===
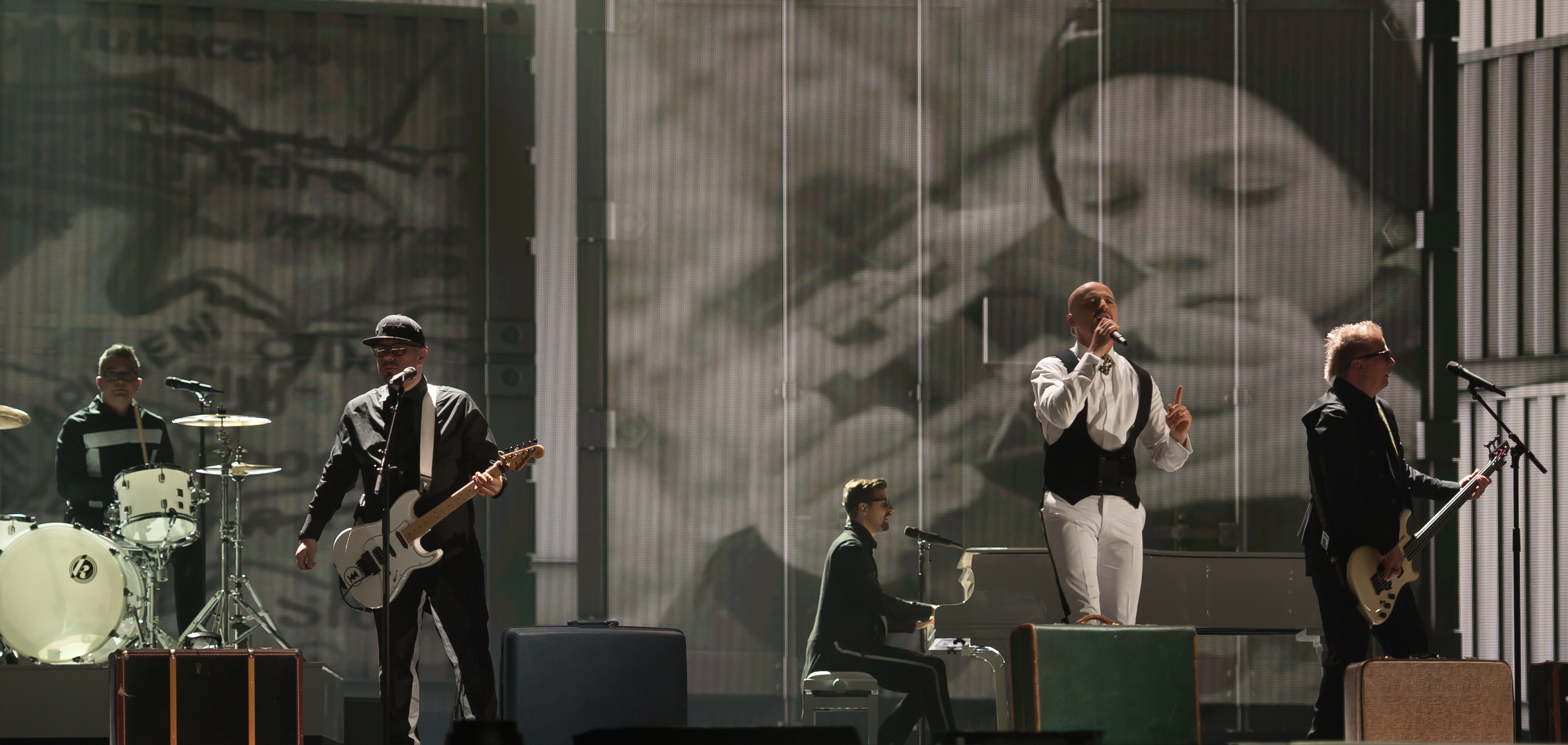
Voltaj during a rehearsal before the first semi-final

Voltaj took part in technical rehearsals on 12 and 15 May, followed by dress rehearsals on 18 and 19 May. This included the jury show on 18 May where the professional juries of each country watched and voted on the competing entries.

The stage show featured the members of Voltaj dressed in black outfits designed by Florin Dobre and performing in a band set-up with several suitcases placed around the stage floor. The background LED screens displayed stacked intermodal containers with scenes from the music video of "De la capăt" being projected on their surfaces. The stage director and member of the Romanian delegation, Daniel Klinger, stated: "It is all about the message of a song, especially because the guys perform their song in Romanian. The colour set up will be mostly black and white, but we will use some inserts from the video and show them in the background."

At the end of the show, Romania was announced as having finished in the top ten and subsequently qualifying for the grand final. It was later revealed that Romania placed fifth in the semi-final, receiving a total of 89 points.

=== Final ===
Shortly after the first semi-final, a winner's press conference was held for the ten qualifying countries. As part of this press conference, the qualifying artists took part in a draw to determine which half of the grand final they would subsequently participate in. This draw was done in the order the countries were announced during the semi-final. Romania was drawn to compete in the second half. Following this draw, the shows' producers decided upon the running order of the final, as they had done for the semi-finals. Romania was subsequently placed to perform in position 20, following the entry from Latvia and before the entry from Spain.

Voltaj once again took part in dress rehearsals on 22 and 23 May before the final, including the jury final where the professional juries cast their final votes before the live show. Voltaj performed a repeat of their semi-final performance during the final on 23 May. At the conclusion of the voting, Romania finished in fifteenth place with 35 points.

=== Voting ===
Voting during the three shows consisted of 50 percent public televoting and 50 percent from a jury deliberation. The jury consisted of five music industry professionals who were citizens of the country they represent, with their names published before the contest to ensure transparency. This jury was asked to judge each contestant based on: vocal capacity; the stage performance; the song's composition and originality; and the overall impression by the act. In addition, no member of a national jury could be related in any way to any of the competing acts in such a way that they cannot vote impartially and independently. The individual rankings of each jury member were released shortly after the grand final.

Following the release of the full split voting by the EBU after the conclusion of the competition, it was revealed that Romania had placed twelfth with the public televote and twenty-first with the jury vote in the final. In the public vote, Romania scored 69 points, while with the jury vote, Romania scored 21 points. In the first semi-final, Romania placed fifth with the public televote with 93 points and eighth with the jury vote, scoring 64 points.

Below is a breakdown of points awarded to Romania and awarded by Romania in the first semi-final and grand final of the contest, and the breakdown of the jury voting and televoting conducted during the two shows:

==== Points awarded to Romania ====
Points awarded to Romania (Semi-final 1)
| Score | Country |
|---|---|
| 12 points | Moldova |
| 10 points | |
| 8 points | Albania; Austria; France; Spain |
| 7 points | Belgium |
| 6 points | Denmark; Finland |
| 5 points | Greece; Hungary |
| 4 points | |
| 3 points | Armenia; Estonia; Serbia |
| 2 points | Belarus; Netherlands |
| 1 point | Australia; Georgia; Russia |

Points awarded to Romania (Final)
| Score | Country |
|---|---|
| 12 points | Moldova |
| 10 points | |
| 8 points | |
| 7 points | |
| 6 points | |
| 5 points | Belgium; Israel; Spain |
| 4 points | Portugal |
| 3 points | |
| 2 points | Denmark |
| 1 point | Cyprus; Hungary |

==== Points awarded by Romania ====
Points awarded by Romania (Semi-final 1)
| Score | Country |
|---|---|
| 12 points | Russia |
| 10 points | Hungary |
| 8 points | Moldova |
| 7 points | Belgium |
| 6 points | Greece |
| 5 points | Denmark |
| 4 points | Georgia |
| 3 points | Netherlands |
| 2 points | Estonia |
| 1 point | Armenia |

Points awarded by Romania (Final)
| Score | Country |
|---|---|
| 12 points | Italy |
| 10 points | Russia |
| 8 points | Sweden |
| 7 points | Belgium |
| 6 points | Norway |
| 5 points | Latvia |
| 4 points | Hungary |
| 3 points | Azerbaijan |
| 2 points | Australia |
| 1 point | Israel |

==== Detailed voting results ====
The following members comprised the Romanian jury:

- Viorel Gavrilă (jury chairperson) – composer
- Mihai Pocorschi – producer, songwriter
- Ovidiu Jacobsen (Ovi) – singer, songwriter, producer, instrumentalist, represented Romania at the Eurovision Song Contest in 2010 and 2014
- Anca Lupeș – concert organiser, producer
- Alexandra Cepraga – sound engineer

Detailed voting results from Romania (Semi-final 1)
| R/O | Country | V. Gavrilă | M. Pocorschi | Ovi | A. Lupeș | A. Cepraga | Jury Rank | Televote Rank | Combined Rank | Points |
|---|---|---|---|---|---|---|---|---|---|---|
| 01 | Moldova | 7 | 4 | 6 | 8 | 6 | 7 | 1 | 3 | 8 |
| 02 | Armenia | 9 | 8 | 14 | 9 | 9 | 10 | 11 | 10 | 1 |
| 03 | Belgium | 2 | 5 | 1 | 6 | 4 | 3 | 7 | 4 | 7 |
| 04 | Netherlands | 6 | 2 | 7 | 4 | 7 | 5 | 9 | 8 | 3 |
| 05 | Finland | 15 | 15 | 13 | 15 | 15 | 15 | 8 | 11 | |
| 06 | Greece | 4 | 7 | 5 | 7 | 5 | 6 | 5 | 5 | 6 |
| 07 | Estonia | 12 | 14 | 3 | 12 | 11 | 11 | 4 | 9 | 2 |
| 08 | Macedonia | 13 | 12 | 15 | 13 | 12 | 14 | 14 | 15 | |
| 09 | Serbia | 8 | 13 | 12 | 11 | 14 | 12 | 12 | 12 | |
| 10 | Hungary | 5 | 3 | 10 | 3 | 2 | 4 | 2 | 2 | 10 |
| 11 | Belarus | 11 | 6 | 11 | 10 | 8 | 9 | 15 | 13 | |
| 12 | Russia | 1 | 1 | 4 | 2 | 1 | 1 | 3 | 1 | 12 |
| 13 | Denmark | 3 | 9 | 2 | 1 | 3 | 2 | 10 | 6 | 5 |
| 14 | Albania | 14 | 11 | 9 | 14 | 10 | 13 | 13 | 14 | |
| 15 | Romania | | | | | | | | | |
| 16 | Georgia | 10 | 10 | 8 | 5 | 13 | 8 | 6 | 7 | 4 |

Detailed voting results from Romania (Final)
| R/O | Country | V. Gavrilă | M. Pocorschi | Ovi | A. Lupeș | A. Cepraga | Jury Rank | Televote Rank | Combined Rank | Points |
|---|---|---|---|---|---|---|---|---|---|---|
| 01 | Slovenia | 20 | 15 | 20 | 24 | 20 | 20 | 20 | 21 | |
| 02 | France | 4 | 8 | 9 | 12 | 4 | 7 | 24 | 17 | |
| 03 | Israel | 16 | 13 | 16 | 25 | 18 | 17 | 8 | 10 | 1 |
| 04 | Estonia | 24 | 25 | 12 | 21 | 25 | 24 | 7 | 15 | |
| 05 | United Kingdom | 19 | 19 | 18 | 22 | 15 | 18 | 22 | 22 | |
| 06 | Armenia | 22 | 20 | 24 | 18 | 24 | 25 | 17 | 23 | |
| 07 | Lithuania | 25 | 22 | 15 | 19 | 23 | 23 | 26 | 26 | |
| 08 | Serbia | 15 | 23 | 25 | 20 | 19 | 22 | 16 | 20 | |
| 09 | Norway | 2 | 2 | 1 | 10 | 1 | 2 | 13 | 5 | 6 |
| 10 | Sweden | 5 | 5 | 2 | 5 | 6 | 4 | 3 | 3 | 8 |
| 11 | Cyprus | 14 | 7 | 8 | 6 | 7 | 9 | 23 | 19 | |
| 12 | Australia | 11 | 6 | 7 | 7 | 8 | 8 | 11 | 9 | 2 |
| 13 | Belgium | 3 | 3 | 3 | 3 | 21 | 5 | 6 | 4 | 7 |
| 14 | Austria | 12 | 9 | 11 | 8 | 16 | 11 | 21 | 18 | |
| 15 | Greece | 10 | 18 | 17 | 13 | 10 | 13 | 12 | 11 | |
| 16 | Montenegro | 8 | 10 | 13 | 11 | 9 | 10 | 18 | 14 | |
| 17 | Germany | 21 | 14 | 19 | 17 | 14 | 16 | 15 | 16 | |
| 18 | Poland | 17 | 21 | 23 | 16 | 22 | 21 | 25 | 25 | |
| 19 | Latvia | 7 | 16 | 5 | 1 | 5 | 6 | 10 | 6 | 5 |
| 20 | Romania | | | | | | | | | |
| 21 | Spain | 9 | 24 | 21 | 23 | 17 | 19 | 9 | 13 | |
| 22 | Hungary | 23 | 11 | 22 | 9 | 12 | 15 | 2 | 7 | 4 |
| 23 | Georgia | 13 | 12 | 14 | 14 | 13 | 12 | 14 | 12 | |
| 24 | Azerbaijan | 18 | 17 | 10 | 15 | 11 | 14 | 4 | 8 | 3 |
| 25 | Russia | 1 | 1 | 4 | 2 | 2 | 1 | 5 | 2 | 10 |
| 26 | Albania | 26 | 26 | 26 | 26 | 26 | 26 | 19 | 24 | |
| 27 | Italy | 6 | 4 | 6 | 4 | 3 | 3 | 1 | 1 | 12 |
