= Timpul (song) =

"Timpul (The Time)"

Single by Paula Seling

from the album ...fără sfârşit
- Released: January 1, 2003
- Recorded: 2003
- Genre: Pop, soul
- Length: 3:59
- Label: Cat Music Label, Unicorn Records
- Songwriter(s): Marius Moga
- Producer(s): Dragoş Buliga

Paula Seling singles chronology
"I Promise" (1999)	"Timpul (The Time)" (2003)	"Râd când îmi vine să plâng" ("I laugh when I feel to cry")" (2003)

Music video
- "Timpul" on YouTube

"Timpul" (Romanian for "The Time"), also known as "Timpul (La radio se anunță ploi)", is a pop/adult song by Romanian pop artist Paula Seling, who represented her country in the Eurovision Song Contest 2010. The song peaked at number 10 on the Romanian Top 100, becoming Paula's only top 10 hit. It was the main single from her album ...fără sfârșit, from 2003. The music video was filmed in Venice and premiered in mid-2003.

== Music video ==
The music video was released to Paula Seling's YouTube channel on July 12, 2008, without an audio-only version with lyrics . A new version was uploaded on Paula's new YouTube channel on August 16, 2012.

The video takes place in Venice, Italy, in familiar places such as Piazza San Marco, or the Grand Canal, and it begins with Paula who walks and recalls her past memories, and as she is reminded her story, ponders her desolation, and pain, in the present, trying to forget her break-up. Paula use mimicry when she tries to express her deep emotions, and finds a relief when she sees the pigeons fly through the sky. She sings: The storm is in my eyes, I want to turn back time/ We were kids and we loved each other so much, I remember when we hugged. In this phrase she reveals that her love was from her childhood, and the pain all the more so dreadful for her soul. Later, she meditates and gets used to this sweet pain, and as she sings in a gondola, she tries to understand what was wrong in their relationship; next to a fountain sheltered, the ladylove prays to the God with all of her heart to turn back time, to live again with this lover that change her life forever. The next scene follows Paula walking and touching the old columns, singing, and thinking that some day, her love, will come back. The ultimate scene is the most emblematic, Paula hide her face with a carnival mask, afraid from her lover revenge, but again, she sing full of pain: "Every second is a torture/ And the same are the days that are coming / All I Want are us again". Marius Moga ends the song in the backing-vocals, and Paula screaming forever and for always her pain, the final scene encountering the gondolier with his boat and some shirts, idea that call to mind Paula's loneliness.

== Track listings and formats ==
The Time (Official Version)

1. Timpul (X Factor version) 3:17
2. Timpul (Featuring Andreea Crepcia - Megastar) 5:09

Diana Cazan - cover (contestant on X Factor)

1. Timpul (Karaoke Version) 4:06

== Credits and personnel ==
- Paula Seling - vocals, writing
- Marius Moga - vocals, writing
- Dragoş Buliga– directing, arrangement, co-production
- Şerban Ionescu- camera

== Charts ==
Chart (2013)	Peak position
Romanian Top 100	10
