= Russia in the Eurovision Song Contest 2015 =

- Eurovision Song Contest 2015
- Country: Russia
- Selection process: Internal selection
- Announcement date: Artist: 11 March 2015; Song: 15 March 2015

Competing entry
- Song: "A Million Voices"
- Artist: Polina Gagarina
- Songwriters: Gabriel Alares; Joakim Björnberg; Katrina Noorbergen; Leonid Gutkin; Vladimir Matetsky

Placement
- Semi-final result: Qualified (1st, 182 points)
- Final result: 2nd, 303 points

Participation chronology

Russia was represented at the Eurovision Song Contest 2015 with the song "A Million Voices", written by Gabriel Alares, Joakim Björnberg, Katrina Noorbergen, Leonid Gutkin and Vladimir Matetsky. The song was performed by Polina Gagarina, who was selected by Russian broadcaster Channel One Russia (C1R) in March 2015 to represent the nation at the 2015 contest in Vienna, Austria. In the first of the Eurovision semi-finals "A Million Voices" placed first out of the 16 participating countries, securing its place among the 27 other songs in the final. In Russia's nineteenth Eurovision appearance on 23 May, "A Million Voices" finished in second place, receiving 303 points and full marks from five countries.

== Background ==
Prior to the 2015 contest, Russia had participated in the Eurovision Song Contest eighteen times since its first entry in 1994. Russia had won the contest on one occasion in 2008 with the song "Believe" performed by Dima Bilan. Since the introduction of the semi-finals to the contest in 2004, Russia has, up to 2016, managed to qualify to the final every year. In 2013, C1R opted to send Golos (The Voice) winner Dina Garipova to the contest where she placed fifth in the final with the song "What If". In 2014, RTR selected Junior Eurovision Song Contest 2006 winners Tolmachevy Sisters who placed seventh in the final with the song "Shine".

The Russian broadcaster for the 2015 Contest, who broadcast the event in Russia and organised the selection process for its entry, was Channel One Russia (C1R). Since 2008, the Russian participation in the contest alternates between C1R and Russia-1 (RTR); with C1R in charge for 2015. Russia has used various methods to select the Russian entry in the past, including national finals and internal selections. Since 2013, both Russian broadcasters have been selecting the entry through an internal selection.

== Before Eurovision ==
=== Internal selection ===
It had been rumoured that C1R had internally selected the third season winner of talent show Golos Alexandra Vorobyova after selecting the first season winner of Golos Dina Garipova to represent Russia in the Eurovision Song Contest 2013. This was later denied by Vorobyova in an interview with Love Radio in January 2015, however she was interested in the opportunity. Head of the department of music and entertainment of C1R, Yuriy Aksyuta, stated in an interview with Russian tabloid Komsomolskaya Pravda in February 2015 that Vorobyova would not be selected as they did not want to repeat themselves by once again sending the winner of Golos.

On 9 March 2015, Russian media reported that C1R had internally selected Polina Gagarina to represent Russia in Vienna, which was later confirmed on 11 March 2015 during the C1R news program Vremya. In regards to her selection, Gagarina stated: "This is a level-up for me. And I'm happy to represent my country at such a high-ranking international contest." Polina Gagarina was selected as the Russian entrant by an expert committee from four shortlisted candidates, among them which also included Jasmin, Nargiz Zakirova, and Sergey Lazarev, as reported by Russian media.

The Russian song, "A Million Voices", was presented to the public on 15 March 2015 through the release of the official music video on YouTube. The music video, directed by Konstantin Cherepkov, features Miss Universe Russia 2015 Vladislava Evtushenko. "A Million Voices" was written and composed by Gabriel Alares, Joakim Björnberg, Katrina Noorbergen, Leonid Gutkin and Vladimir Matetsky.

Song selection
Songwriter(s)	Song
Philipp Kirkorov and Dimitris Kontopoulos	Unknown
Leonid Gutkin	"A Million Voices"
Leonid Gutkin	Unknown
Leonid Gutkin	Unknown

== At Eurovision ==
According to Eurovision rules, all nations with the exceptions of the host country and the "Big Five" (France, Germany, Italy, Spain and the United Kingdom) are required to qualify from one of two semi-finals in order to compete for the final; the top ten countries from each semi-final progress to the final. In the 2015 contest, Australia also competed directly in the final as an invited guest nation. The European Broadcasting Union (EBU) split up the competing countries into five different pots based on voting patterns from previous contests, with countries with favourable voting histories put into the same pot. On 26 January 2015, a special allocation draw was held which placed each country into one of the two semi-finals, as well as which half of the show they would perform in. Russia was placed into the first semi-final, to be held on 19 May 2015, and was scheduled to perform in the second half of the show.

Once all the competing songs for the 2015 contest had been released, the running order for the semi-finals was decided by the shows' producers rather than through another draw, so that similar songs were not placed next to each other. Russia was set to perform in position 12, following the entry from Belarus and before the entry from Denmark. All three shows were televised on Channel One Russia, with commentary by Yana Churikova and Yuriy Aksyuta. The Russian spokesperson, who announced the Russian votes during the final, was Dmitry Shepelev.

=== Semi-final ===
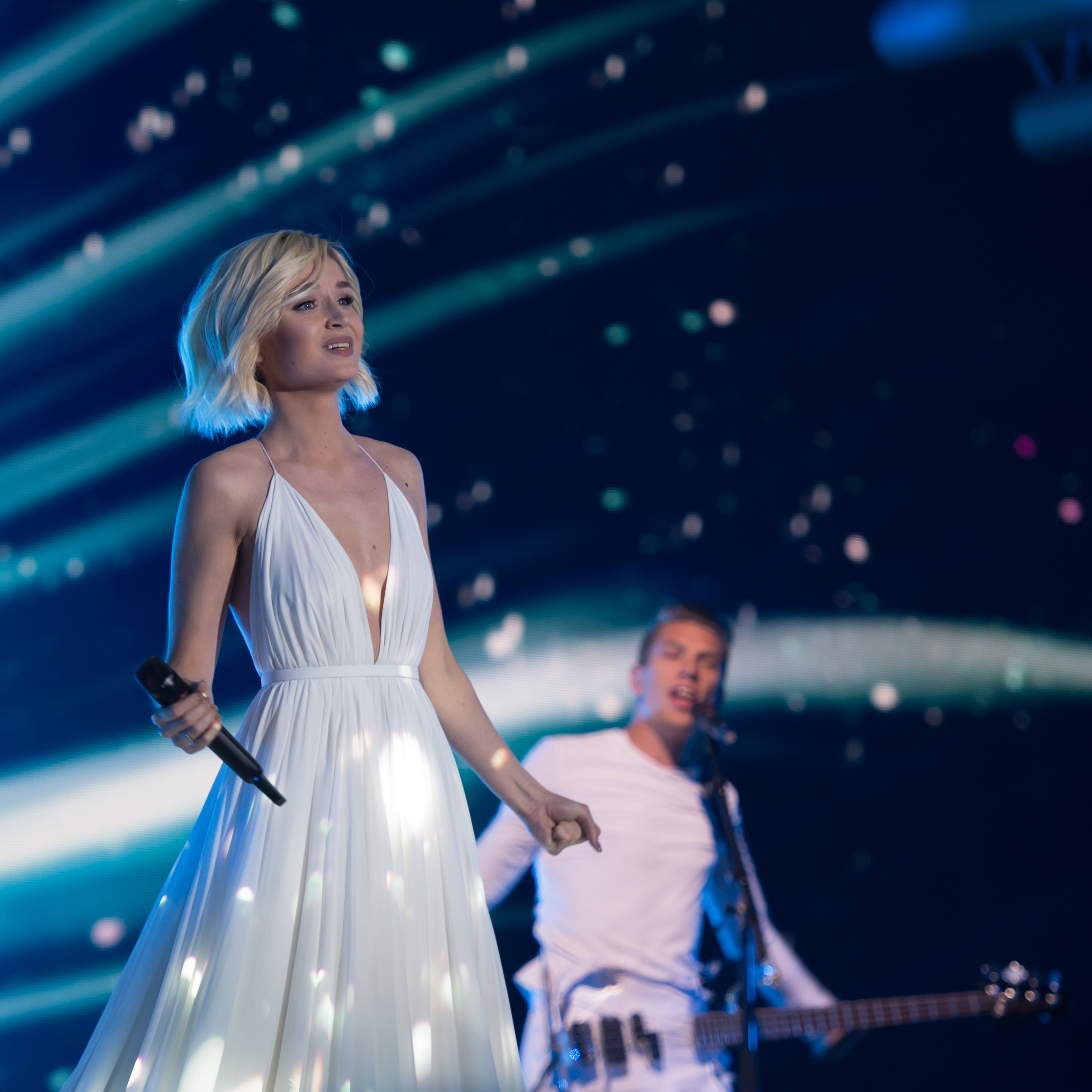
Gagarina at a dress rehearsal for the first semi-final

Gagarina took part in technical rehearsals on 12 and 15 May, followed by dress rehearsals on 18 and 19 May. This included the jury final where professional juries of each country, responsible for 50 percent of each country's vote, watched and voted on the competing entries.

The stage show featured Gagarina in a long white dress created by designer Alexander Terekhov. Gagarina performed the song with projections of stars on her dress. She was surrounded with her backing vocalists in a band set-up: two guitarists, one drummer and two performers. The background LED screens were kept dark for the start of the song and then transitioned to outer space star patterns culminating in a view of planet Earth. On stage, Gagarina was joined by five backing vocalists: Gabriel Alares, Alexandra Belyakova, Alexander Pozdnyakov, Nikita Pozdnyakov and Katrina Noorbergen.

At the end of the show, Russia was announced as having finished in the top ten and subsequently qualifying for the grand final. It was later revealed that Russia won the semi-final, receiving a total of 182 points.

=== Final ===
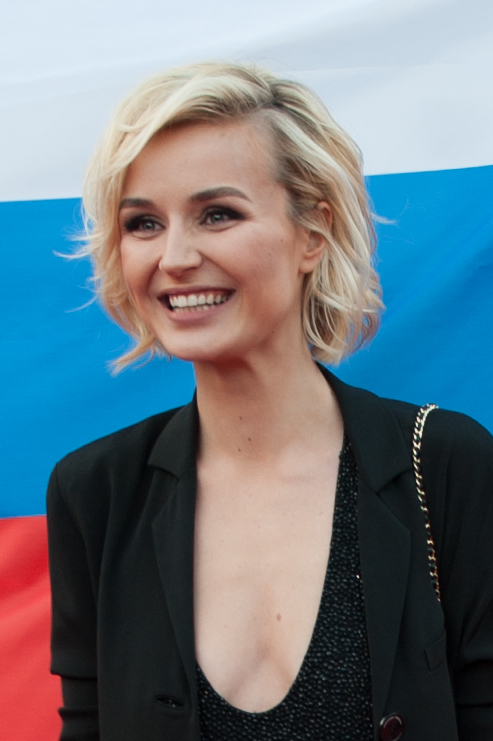
Gagarina during the Eurovision Song Contest opening ceremony

Shortly after the first semi-final, a winner's press conference was held for the ten qualifying countries. As part of this press conference, the qualifying artists took part in a draw to determine which half of the grand final they would subsequently participate in. This draw was done in the order the countries were announced during the semi-final. Russia was drawn to compete in the second half. Following this draw, the shows' producers decided upon the running order of the final, as they had done for the semi-finals. Russia was subsequently placed to perform in position 25, following the entry from Azerbaijan and before the entry from Albania.

Gagarina once again took part in dress rehearsals on 22 and 23 May before the final, including the jury final where the professional juries cast their final votes before the live show. Gagarina performed a repeat of her semi-final performance during the final on 23 May. After leading the voting in its initial stages, Russia eventually finished in second place with 303 points with Sweden and Italy placing first and third respectively. Russia received 12 points, the maximum number of points a country can give to another country, from five countries.

=== Voting ===
Voting during the three shows consisted of 50 percent public televoting and 50 percent from a jury deliberation. The jury consisted of five music industry professionals who were citizens of the country they represent, with their names published before the contest to ensure transparency. This jury was asked to judge each contestant based on: vocal capacity; the stage performance; the song's composition and originality; and the overall impression by the act. In addition, no member of a national jury could be related in any way to any of the competing acts in such a way that they cannot vote impartially and independently. The individual rankings of each jury member were released shortly after the grand final.

Following the release of the full split voting by the EBU after the conclusion of the competition, it was revealed that Russia had placed second with the public televote and third with the jury vote in the final. In the public vote, Russia scored 286 points ending up behind Italy with 366 points and ahead of the eventual winner Sweden, which placed third with 279 points. In the jury vote, Russia placed third with 234 points behind Sweden and Latvia, which occupied the first and second places respectively. In the first semi-final, Russia placed first with the public televote receiving 145 points and first with the jury vote with 159 points.

Below is a breakdown of points awarded to Russia and awarded by Russia in the first semi-final and grand final of the contest, and the breakdown of the jury voting and televoting conducted during the two shows:

==== Points awarded to Russia ====
Points awarded to Russia (Semi-final 1)
Score	Country
12 points	Austria; Belarus; Greece; Hungary; Romania
10 points	Armenia; Australia; Denmark; Finland; France; Netherlands; Serbia
8 points	Belgium; Estonia; Macedonia
7 points	Albania; Georgia; Moldova; Spain
6 points	
5 points	
4 points	
3 points	
2 points	
1 point	

Points awarded to Russia (Final)
Score	Country
12 points	Armenia; Azerbaijan; Belarus; Estonia; Germany
10 points	Australia; Belgium; Denmark; France; Italy; Latvia; Moldova; Portugal; Romania; Serbia; Spain
8 points	Albania; Austria; Czech Republic; Finland; Greece; Ireland; Israel
7 points	Malta; Montenegro; Switzerland
6 points	Hungary; Macedonia; Netherlands; Poland; Sweden; United Kingdom
5 points	Cyprus; Georgia; Slovenia
4 points	
3 points	Iceland
2 points	Norway
1 point	

==== Points awarded by Russia ====
Points awarded by Russia (Semi-final 1)
Score	Country
12 points	Armenia
10 points	Estonia
8 points	Belgium
7 points	Georgia
6 points	Belarus
5 points	Greece
4 points	Serbia
3 points	Albania
2 points	Hungary
1 point	Romania

Points awarded by Russia (Final)
Score	Country
12 points	Italy
10 points	Belgium
8 points	Sweden
7 points	Estonia
6 points	Armenia
5 points	Georgia
4 points	Australia
3 points	Azerbaijan
2 points	Latvia
1 point	Spain

==== Detailed voting results ====
The following members comprised the Russian jury:

- Igor Matvienko (jury chairperson) – producer, composer
- Alsou Abramova (Alsou) – singer, represented Russia in the 2000 contest (jury member in semi-final 1)
- Aleksandra Vorobyova – singer (jury member in the final)
- Dina Garipova – singer, journalist, represented Russia in the 2013 contest
- Lyubov Kazarnovskaya – opera singer, professor
- Slava Kulaev – choreographer, director

Detailed voting results from Russia (Semi-final 1)
R/O	Country	I. Matvienko	Alsou	D. Garipova	L. Kazarnovskaya	S. Kulaev	Jury Rank	Televote Rank	Combined Rank	Points
01	Moldova	10	14	10	15	15	14	9	11	
02	Armenia	9	5	6	4	2	4	1	1	12
03	Belgium	2	1	1	1	1	1	5	3	8
04	Netherlands	4	7	8	10	6	8	15	12	
05	Finland	13	15	13	11	13	15	10	14	
06	Greece	5	10	5	8	3	6	7	6	5
07	Estonia	1	3	9	2	4	2	4	2	10
08	Macedonia	15	8	7	12	12	11	14	15	
09	Serbia	8	13	15	9	9	10	6	7	4
10	Hungary	14	12	3	6	11	9	11	9	2
11	Belarus	3	4	14	5	5	7	2	5	6
12	Russia									
13	Denmark	11	9	11	13	10	12	12	13	
14	Albania	6	2	4	3	7	3	13	8	3
15	Romania	12	11	12	14	14	13	8	10	1
16	Georgia	7	6	2	7	8	5	3	4	7

Detailed voting results from Russia (Final)
R/O	Country	I. Matvienko	A. Vorobyova	D. Garipova	L. Kazarnovskaya	S. Kulaev	Jury Rank	Televote Rank	Combined Rank	Points
01	Slovenia	9	26	22	6	21	17	14	13	
02	France	24	24	21	7	8	18	25	24	
03	Israel	15	21	26	8	22	22	10	14	
04	Estonia	3	5	15	9	6	5	4	4	7
05	United Kingdom	14	23	19	10	23	20	24	25	
06	Armenia	13	14	10	4	19	9	2	5	6
07	Lithuania	12	12	20	14	24	16	22	22	
08	Serbia	11	22	25	24	25	25	9	16	
09	Norway	23	19	5	11	12	14	20	17	
10	Sweden	1	1	1	2	4	1	5	3	8
11	Cyprus	26	11	13	25	18	23	19	23	
12	Australia	4	2	4	15	2	3	12	7	4
13	Belgium	2	4	2	3	1	2	3	2	10
14	Austria	7	18	14	5	5	7	26	15	
15	Greece	8	17	11	13	7	8	15	11	
16	Montenegro	22	16	24	20	16	24	13	20	
17	Germany	16	10	6	21	17	13	21	18	
18	Poland	17	13	12	22	20	19	17	19	
19	Latvia	10	8	17	12	26	15	6	9	2
20	Romania	25	15	16	23	11	21	16	21	
21	Spain	18	7	18	16	10	12	11	10	1
22	Hungary	19	6	7	17	13	10	18	12	
23	Georgia	5	9	8	18	9	6	7	6	5
24	Azerbaijan	6	20	9	19	14	11	8	8	3
25	Russia									
26	Albania	21	25	23	26	15	26	23	26	
27	Italy	20	3	3	1	3	4	1	1	12
