= Ovidiu Cernăuțeanu =

Romanian-Norwegian singer

Ovi
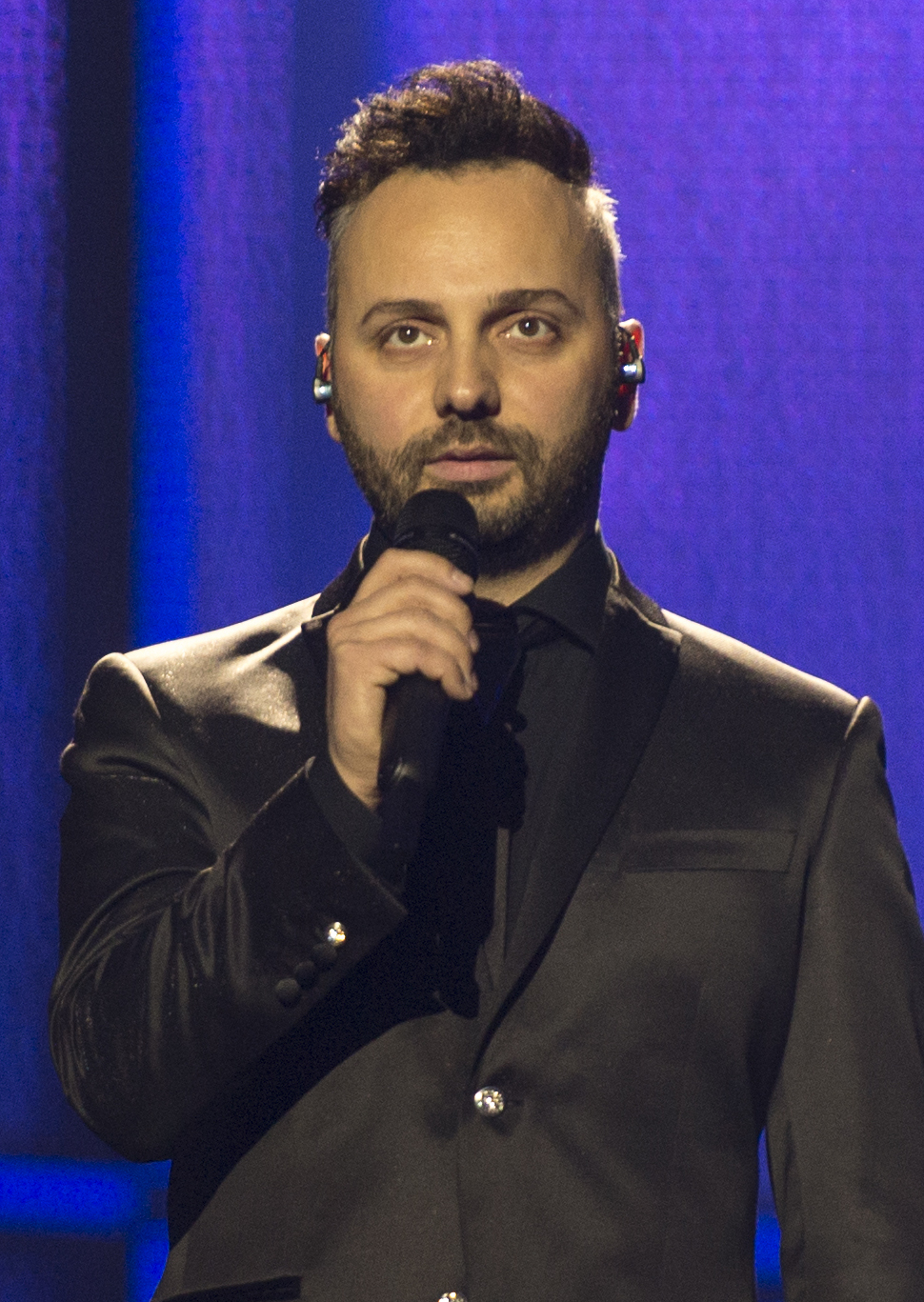
- Ovi in 2014

Background information
- Also known as: Ovi Martin; Ovi Jacobsen
- Born: Ovidiu Cernăuţeanu; 23 August 1974 (age 52); Botoșani, Romania
- Origin: Norway
- Genres: Pop
- Occupations: Singer; songwriter
- Years active: 1994–present
- Label: daWorks

Ovidiu Cernăuțeanu (Romanian pronunciation: [oˈvidju tʃernə.uˈtse̯anu]; born 23 August 1974), also known by his stage names Ovi Martin, Ovi Jacobsen, or simply Ovi, is a Romanian-Norwegian singer and songwriter. After being raised in Botoșani, he moved to Norway in 1995.

He rose to fame in Norway in 2006 when he first took part in the Melodi Grand Prix 2006 with the song "The Better Side of Me" where he did not qualify to the final. The next year he was a finalist of the Melodi Grand Prix 2009 with the song "Seven Seconds" but lost to Alexander Rybak. In 2010 he participated in the Selecția Națională 2010 for Romania alongside duet partner Paula Seling. They won with the song "Playing with Fire" with which they represented Romania in the Eurovision Song Contest 2010. They qualified for the grand final where they took the third position, only behind winner Germany and runner-up Turkey. After Eurovision, Ovi released a new duet with Seling; "We Got Something".

In 2012 he was back in the Melodi Grand Prix 2012 this time as a songwriter along with Thomas G:son and Tommy Berre for the song "High on Love" as performed by Reidun Sæther. The song qualified for the final. Apart from the European recognition, Ovi has also entered several music charts with songs like "Seven Seconds" (2009), "Playing with Fire" (2010) or "We Got Something" (2011) – the latter two are featuring Paula Seling. He is also the Popularity Award winner of the 2009 Golden Stag Festival in Romania.

In 2014 he returned to Eurovision Song Contest 2014 together with duet partner Paula Seling when they participated for Romania with the song "Miracle". The same year Ovi co-wrote the song She's After My Piano for the group 2 Fabiola who participated in the Belgium national selection for Eurovision Song Contest 2014. The song did not win in Belgium but became a major hit for 2 Fabiola. Later Ovi and Paula Seling recorded their own version of the song for Ovi's album A Bit of Pop Won't Hurt Anyone, 5 May 2014 (daWorks).

== Melodi Grand Prix ==
Ovidiu Cernăuțeanu submitted several songs written and performed by himself for the Melodi Grand Prix selections in the last 2000s but was only selected towards the semi-finals twice. In 2008 his entry had no success, while in the Melodi Grand Prix 2009 he was in for the Final on 21 February with the song "Seven Seconds" but did not qualify for the Golden Final. The song was even though a mild chart success, entering the top-fifteen of the VG-lista at number-twelve.

== Eurovision Song Contest ==
Cernăuțeanu represented Romania in the Eurovision Song Contest 2010 (as Ovi) in a duet with Paula Seling. They performed "Playing with Fire", which was composed by Cernăuțeanu himself. They passed the second semi-final, where they placed fourth. In the Grand Final, Seling and Ovi performed nineteenth (after France and before Russia). At the voting, they got 162 points and placed third that night, equaling the best result for Romania in the contest. They received 12 points from Moldova and 10 points from Norway, Portugal, Spain and Sweden. Only eight countries did not give the top ten points to them that night.

On 1 March 2014, Paula Seling and Ovi won the Romanian national selection Selecția Națională 2014 and were selected as the Romanian entry for the Eurovision Song Contest 2014 in Copenhagen with the song "Miracle". The duo came in 12th place receiving 12 points only from Moldova.

== See also ==
- List of music released by Romanian artists that has charted in major music markets

Awards and achievements
Preceded by Elena Gheorghe with The Balkan Girls	Romania in the Eurovision Song Contest; 2010 (with Paula Seling)	Succeeded by Hotel FM with Change
Preceded by Cezar with It's My Life	Romania in the Eurovision Song Contest; 2014 (with Paula Seling)	Succeeded by Voltaj with De la capăt
