= Paula Seling =

Romanian singer-songwriter and TV presenter (born 1978)

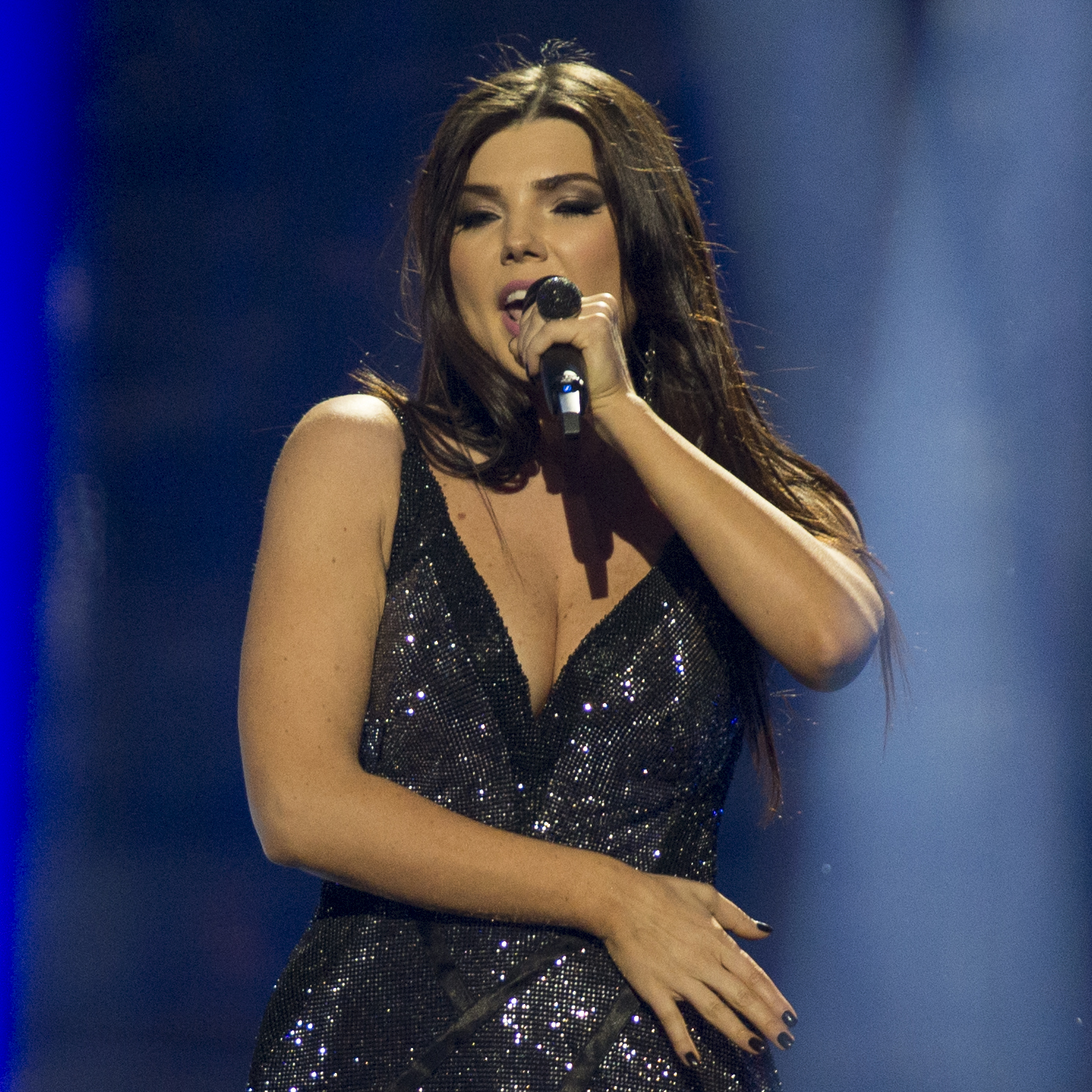
- Seling in 2014

Background information
- Born: 25 December 1978 (age 47); Baia Mare, Romania
- Genres: Pop; Latin pop; R&B; soul; dance
- Occupations: Singer; songwriter; musician; record producer; radio personality; television personality
- Instruments: Vocals; piano; keyboard; synthesizer
- Years active: 1995–present
- Labels: Unicorn; Roton; CatMusic Production
- Website: paulaseling.com

Paula Seling (Romanian pronunciation: [ˈpa.ula ˈseliŋɡ]; born 25 December 1978) is a Romanian singer, songwriter, record producer, and television personality. She has released more than thirteen albums (including three Christmas albums) and over twenty singles, which include two top-ten hits in the Romanian Top 100, and a minor European hit which entered the charts in Finland and Norway, as well as the UK Singles Chart.

Together with Ovidiu Cernăuțeanu, Seling has represented Romania in the Eurovision Song Contest twice: in 2010 with the song "Playing with Fire", finishing 3rd, and in 2014 with the song "Miracle", finishing 12th.

In 2010 she participated in Dansez Pentru Tine (Romanian "Dancing with the Stars"), finishing 3rd. From October 2011, she was also a juror and mentor in the Romanian version of X Factor.

== Early life ==
Paula Seling was born in Baia Mare, northwestern Romania, on 25 December 1978. She began playing piano when she was six years old. At the age of 10, she began to sing in the school choir, soon becoming a soloist. She entered a series of piano contests and choral music contests between the ages of 11 and 15, before joining a school band named the Enders as a pianist in 1994.

After graduating from the Gheorghe Șincai National College in Baia Mare in June 1997, she studied journalism at the Școala Superioară de Jurnalism in Bucharest, graduating in 2002.

== Career ==
=== Early career ===
In 1995, she won the Best Instrumental Interpreter award at the "Steaua de cristal" (The Crystal Star) Contest in Botoșani, "Ursulețul de aur" (The Golden Teddy Bear) award in Baia Mare, and first place at the "Armonia" (Harmony) Festival in Bucharest.

In 1996, she won the "Aurelian Andreescu" trophy under the guidance of Anda Popp, and made her first performance at the Golden Stag Festival, also appearing in the show Viața de român ("Romanian life"), as a backing vocalist.

In 1997, she opened for Joan Baez, and participated in the Mamaia Trophy with the Romanian-language song "Trurli". She sang on the show Din darul magilor ('From the Magi's Gift') in December 1997.

The following year she released her first album in English, Only Love, recorded at Sound House Records, Germany.

Seling first competed in the Selectia Nationala in 1998, collaborating with band Talisman on the song "Te iubesc", which came 4th with 565 points, finishing 2nd in the jury vote and 6th in the televote. Around the same time, she was named "Woman of the Year" for 1998 by Avantaje magazine.

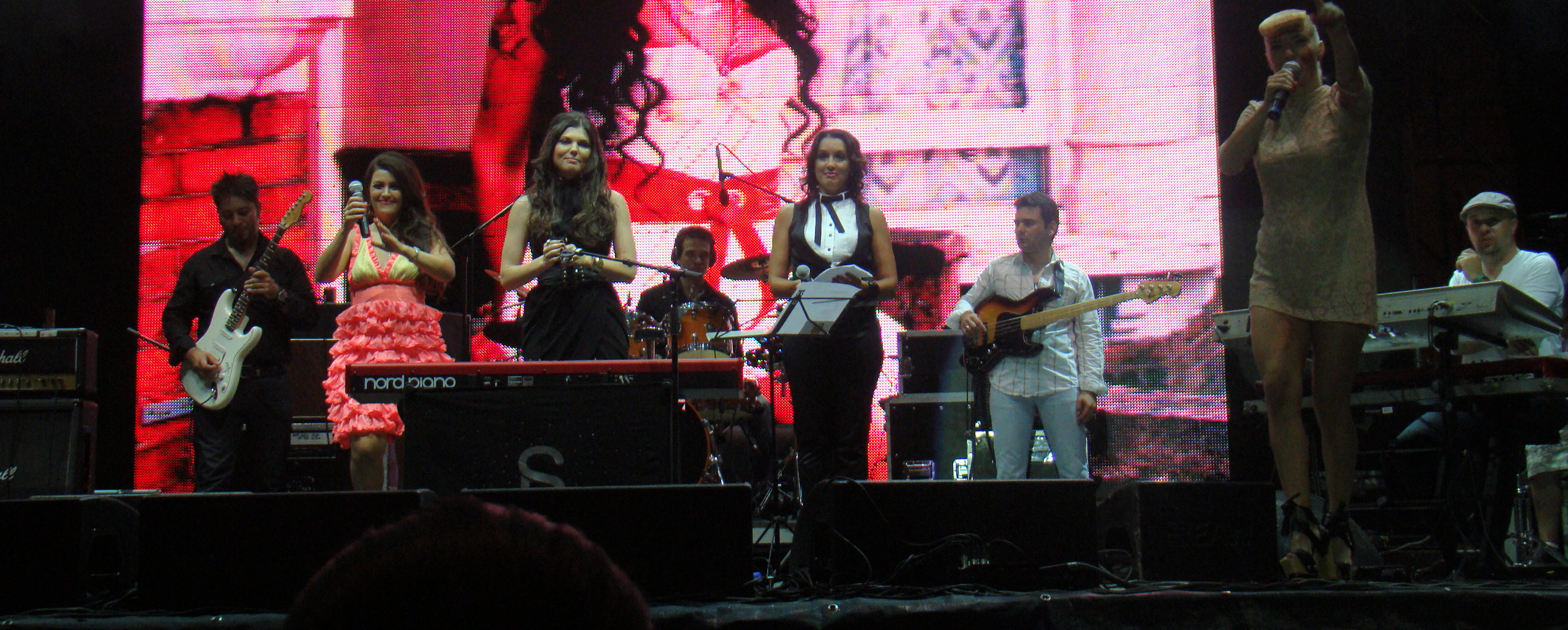
Seling at an Amy Winehouse tribute concert in Bucharest

On 9 November 1998, Seling was the opening act for Chick Corea's concert in Bucharest. Following the concert Seling collaborated with percussionist Lucian Maxim on a project fusing jazz, classical music and old Romanian gypsy music.

In 1999 Seling released her first complete album, entitled De dragoste ("For Love"), a collection of 10 songs composed by Nicu Alifantis. The album included tracks such as "Almost Silence"/"Aproape liniște"; "The Shadow"/"Umbra"; and "How Good That You Exist"/"Ce bine că ești".

=== 2001-2009: Awards and rise to fame ===
Seling competed in the Mamaia Festival 2001 with her performance of "Ploaie în luna lui marte" (Rain in the Moon of Mars), a cover of a song by Nicu Alifantis, which was named Hit of the Year. Dana Cristescu proposed Alifantis to work on Seling's next album as a composer and producer. "Ploaie în luna lui marte" was chosen to be the first track.

In January 2001 Seling released the album Mă voi întoarce ("I will return"), which included "Lângă mine" (Next to me), a duet with Cristi Enache of Direcția 5.

Paula and Paul Seling worked on the album, Știi ce înseamnă (să fii fericit) ("You know what it means (to be happy)") until the autumn of 2001, collaborating with Cezar Stănciulescu and Cristi Ștefănescu of the band NSK. All the lyrics for the album were written by Paula. Also in 2001, Seling released the album Prima selecție ("First selection"), a collection of live recordings, duets and re-recordings, and collaborated with Puya from La Familia.

As 2001 ended, Seling received the "Best Female Singer" award at the Romanian Music Industry awards. The video for the track "Serile verii" ("Summer evenings") from the Știi ce înseamnă... album, directed by Romanian director Andreea Păduraru, won the awards for Best Artist in a Music Video and Best Music Video at the 2002 MTV Music Awards Romania 2002.

She won the Golden Stag Festival in 2002, and was signed by Roton Records in autumn that year.

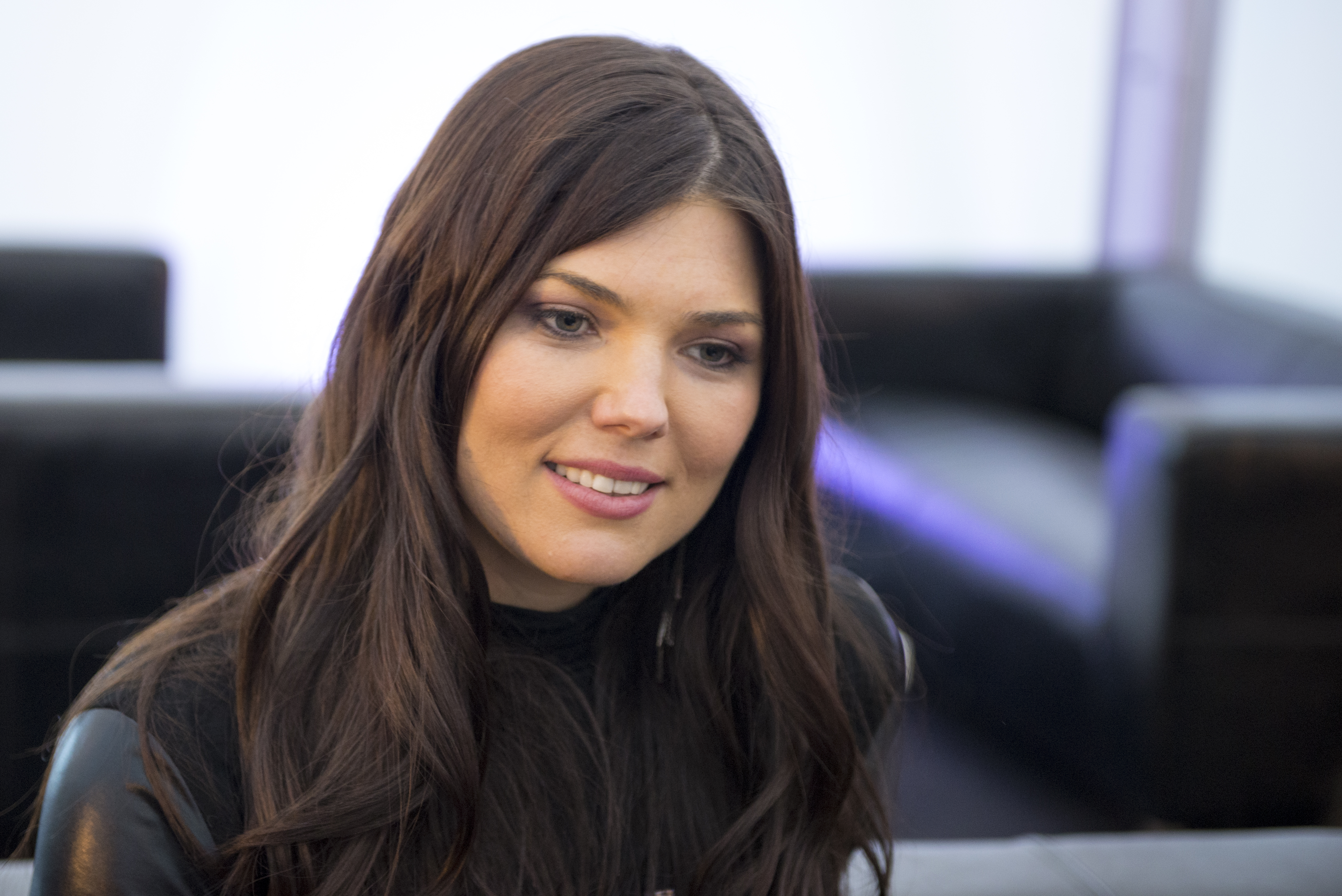
Paula Seling in Copenhagen for the Eurovision Song Contest

In 2002, producer, composer, director and writer Tony Hawks cast Seling in a documentary movie on the Discovery Channel, named "One Hit Wonderland", in which Seling and Hawks recorded one of Hawks's compositions in his studio from London, which was then promoted in the city. They performed the song on Gloria Hunniford's show, Open House with Gloria Hunniford, on Channel 5 in London.

Seling and her husband launched their own record label, Unicorn Records, in 2005. In 2007 she opened for Michael Bolton (7 July) and Beyonce (26 October).

In 2008, Seling released a 19-track compilation album of her first 10 years of recordings, entitled 1998-2008. Some of the tracks were in their original versions, while others were re-recorded in the Unicorn Records studio. That year, she also finished in 3rd place in the Selecția Națională Eurovision Final with the song "Seven Days", and performed a duet with "manele" singer Florin Salam at the Bucharest Symphony Orchestra.

Her double album Culeg Vise/Believe was released in 2009, on which Seling composed, produced and arranged all 17 songs. The first single from the album, "Believe", reached the top 40 of the Romanian Top 100, and the album itself went on to win "Best Pop Album" at the Romanian National Radio Awards in 2010.

Seling won first prize at the Mamaia festival in 2009, and attended the Golden Stag Festival as a judge in September 2009, where she met her future collaborator Ovidiu Cernăuțeanu.

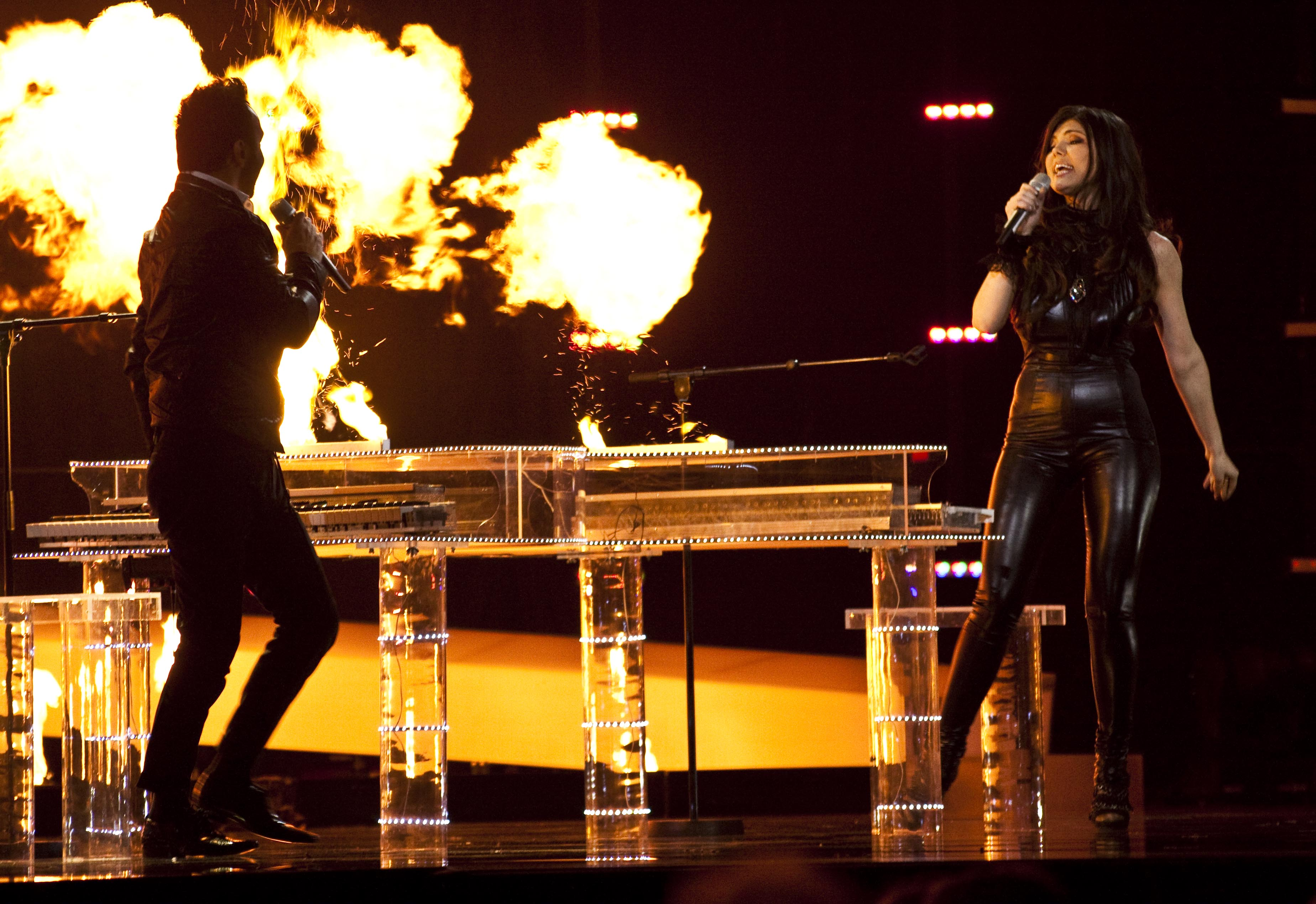
Paula Seling and Ovi performing "Playing with Fire" during the second semi-final of Eurovision Song Contest 2010.

=== Eurovision Song Contest 2010 ===
Cernăuțeanu contacted Seling in November 2009, inviting her to collaborate on an entry to the 2010 Selectia Nationala. They re-recorded the original version of the song "Playing With Fire", and were selected as a finalist for the show on 27 January 2010, and won the competition on 6 March 2010.

Seling and Cernăuțeanu performed "Playing with Fire" live in the second Eurovision Song Contest 2010 semi-final in Oslo on 27 May 2010. They finished 4th in the semi-final to qualify for the final on 29 May 2010, where they finished 3rd, equalling the highest ever ranking for Romania in the Eurovision Song Contest.

=== Post-Eurovision career and reality TV work ===
In 2010, Seling joined the Romanian televised dance competition Dansez pentru tine (the Romanian version of Dancing With the Stars) with her partner Tudor Moldoveanu. The pair came third in the competition. Seling was the co-host of the Eurovision Song Contest 2011 Romanian national final, held on New Year's Eve night on TVR 1, along with Cernăuțeanu and Marina Almasan-Socaciu. She also provided the Romanian voice for Holley Shiftwell in Cars 2 in 2011.

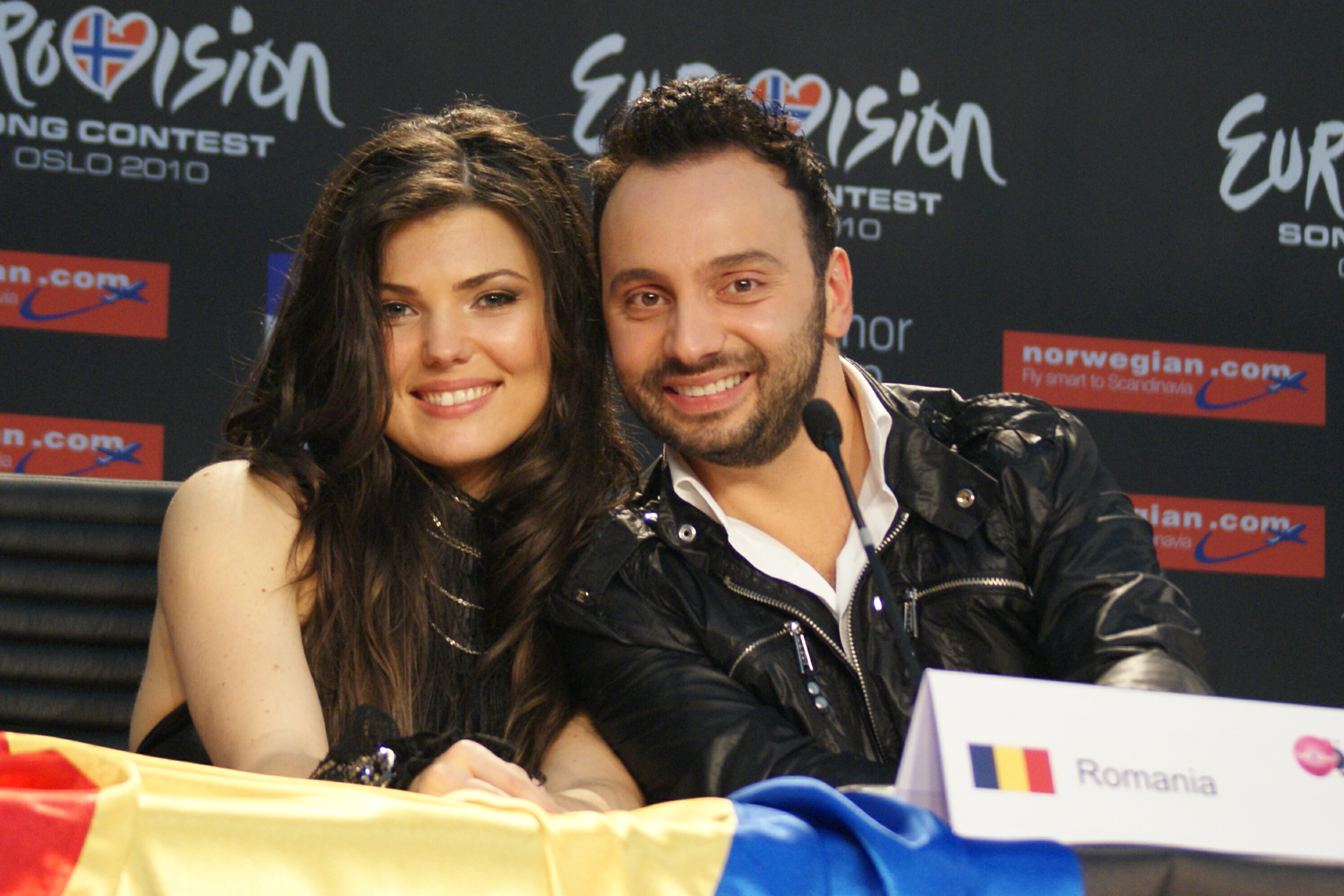
Paula and Ovi in Romania at TVR1 after Eurovision.

In early 2011, Seling released a new song, "I Feel Free". In April 2011, Romanian TV station Antena 1 (part of the Intact Media Group) announced that the British reality TV music contest X Factor would come to Romania, and in early June, it was announced that Seling would be one of three judges on the show.

In late 2011, Seling recorded duets with Alexander Ryback, Ovi Cernăuțeanu and Al Bano, for inclusion alongside "I Feel Free" and another at least eight songs on a new album due in 2012. In February 2012, it was reported that Seling would return to Selectia Nationala 2012, in order to represent Romania in the Eurovision Song Contest 2012. However, she later announced that the song she was preparing for the contest wasn't ready, and would instead be entered for the Eurovision Song Contest 2013. She was the spokesperson for Romania and presented the votes during the grand final of the Eurovision Song Contest 2012.

In 2013, Seling began endorsing a Romanian moisturising cream, Gerovital. The brand Loncolor asked Seling to become their brand ambassador in 2012, representing LONCOLOR enVogue 535.

In 2012, Selling was chosen by Disney to record the song "My Spirit Flies" ("Chiar pot zbura"), for the Pixar animation Brave.

In August 2012, she released a single with Alexander Rybak called "I'll Show You".

=== Eurovision Song Contest 2014 ===
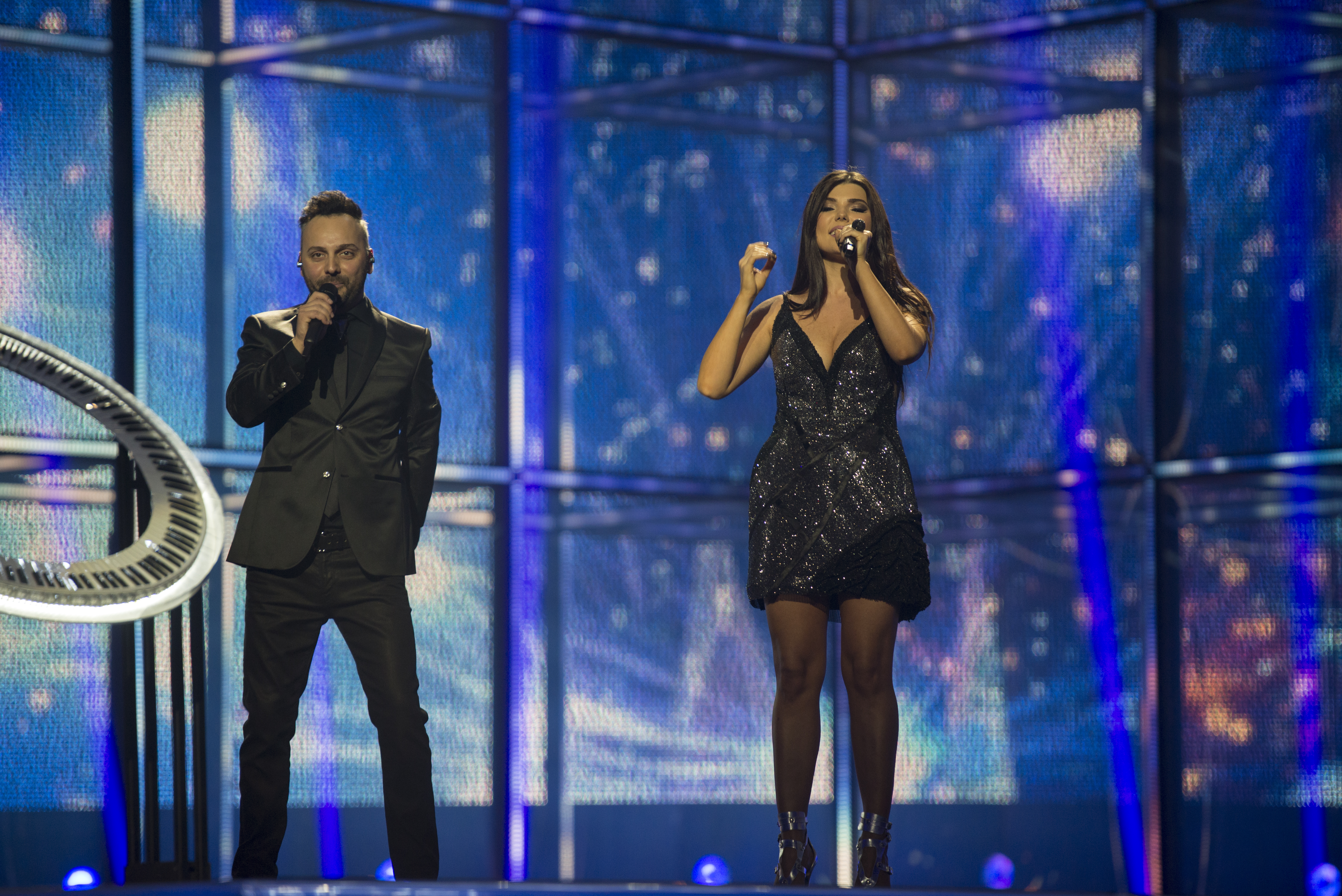
Paula Seling and Ovi performing their song in the first dress rehearsal for the second semi-final of the Eurovision Song Contest 2014

On 1 March 2014, Paula Seling and Ovi Cernăuțeanu again won the Selectia Nationala, and were chosen as the Romanian entry for the Eurovision Song Contest 2014 in Copenhagen, with the song "Miracle". Seling and Cernăuțeanu performed "Miracle" live in the second semi-final on 8 May 2014. They qualified from the semi-finals, and finished 12th in the final on 10 May 2014.

== Personal life ==
Seling married Radu Bucura in 2005; the two had known each other since their teenage years, and he was later the drummer in Dana Nălbaru's band. In 2022, Seling announced that she and Bucura had adopted a daughter, Elena, several years earlier; Elena was three years old at the time of the adoption. The couple later divorced after 17 years of marriage, but continue to co-parent their daughter.

A Romanian Orthodox Christian, Seling is anti-abortion and attended the March for Life in Bucharest in March 2016.

Seling speaks, writes, and performs in French, English, and Romanian; she also performs in Italian.

== Awards and nominations ==
Year	Type	Award	Result
2002	Golden Stag Festival	Golden Stag Trophy	Won
2002	Romanian Musical Industry Awards	Best Female	Won
2002	MTV Romania Music Awards	Best Music Video	Won
2002	"Avantaje" Magazine	Woman of the Year	Won
2000s	Fildorf Festival	Various Awards	Won
2010	Selectia nationala	Romania in the Eurovision Song Contest	Won
2010	RRA Awards	Best Pop Album	Won
2010	RRA Awards	Best Pop Song	Won
2010	Eurovision Song Contest	Semi-Final	Qualified
2010	Eurovision Song Contest	Final	3rd Place
2011	"Successful Women Awards"	Young Talents	Won
2011	"RRA Awards 2011"	"Artist of the Year"	Won
2011	"RRA Awards 2011"	"Female Performance of the Year"	Nominated
2011	"RRA Awards 2011"	"Best Pop Song" (Playing With Fire)	Won
2014	Selecția Națională	Romania in the Eurovision Song Contest	Won
2014	Eurovision Song Contest	Semi-Final	Qualified
2014	Eurovision Song Contest	Final	12th place

== Discography ==
=== Albums ===
Year	Album details
1998	Only Love: Released: May 1998; Format: CD; Label: Roton; Note: Debut Album
1998	Ştiu că Exist: Release Date: 1998; Format: CD; Label: Roton
1998	Colinde şi cântece sfinte: Release Date: December 1998; Format: CD; Label: Cat Music; Note: Christmas album, with Narcisa Suciu
1999	De Dragoste: Release Date: November 1999; Format: CD; Label: Roton; Note: Compilation album
2001	Mă Voi Întoarce: Release Date: 2001; Format: Audio Tape; Label: Cat
2001	Ştii ce înseamnă: Release Date: July 2001; Format: CD; Label: Roton
2001	Prima Selectie: Release Date: November 2001; Format: CD´S; Label: Roton; Note: Best Of
2002	Albumul de Craciun: Released: December 2002; Format: CD; Label: Roton; Note: Christmas album
2003	Fără Sfârşit: Released: 14 May 2003; Format: CD; Label: Roton, Universal; Note: First album to hit the stores
2006	De Sărbători: Released: 3 December 2006; Format: CD; Label: Roton; Note: Christmas album
2009	Culeg Vise: Released: January 2009; Format: CD, digital download; Label: Universal, Unicorn
2009	Believe: Released: 10 June 2009; Format: CD; Label: Roton, Universal; Note: First album in English
2010	Playing with Fire: Release Date: 2010; Note: With Ovi, from Eurovision
2013	One Mile of Words: Release Date: 2013; Genre: Pop:Dream Pop; Label: Universal

=== Singles ===
Title	Year	Peak Chart Positions									Album
Title	Year	ROM	SWE	BUL	RUS	NOR	FIN	IRE	SWI	UK	Album
"Ploaie în Luna lui Marte"	1998	3	—	—	—	—	—	—	—	—	Ştiu că exist
"Te iubesc" (featuring Talisman)	1998	88	—	—	—	—	—	—	—	—	Romania in the Eurovision Song Contest 1998
"Lânga mine" (featuring Direcṭia 5)	2001	100	—	—	—	—	—	—	—	—	Mă Voi Întoarce
"Un băiat şi o fată" (featuring Parlament)	2001	41	—	—	—	—	—	—	—	—	Prima Selecţie
"Promit"	2001	24	—	—	—	—	—	—	—	—	Stii ce inseamna
"Serile Verii"	2001	—	—	—	—	—	—	—	—	—	Stii ce inseamna
"Timpul"	2003	10	—	—	—	—	—	—	—	—	...fara sfarsit
"Chip de Inger"	2003	69	—	—	—	—	—	—	—	—	...fara sfarsit
"Culeg Vise"	2009	98	—	—	—	—	—	—	—	—	Culeg Vise
"Believe"	2009	55	—	—	—	—	—	—	—	—	Believe
"Playing with Fire" (featuring Ovi)	2010	65	29	44	112	12	28	—	51	200	Playing with Fire
"Counting Down" (featuring Ovi)	2011	—	—	—	—	—	—	—	—	—	Playing with Fire
"Calling You (Hello, Hello)" (featuring Ovi)	2011	66	—	—	—	—	—	—	—	—	Playing with Fire
"I Feel Free" (featuring Plan D)	2011	10	—	—	—	—	—	—	—	100	Non-album single
"Pansament"	2013	10	—	—	—	—	—	—	—	—	One Mile of Words
"Miracle" (featuring Ovi)	2014	—	—	—	—	—	—	88	—	174	Non-album single
"—" denotes a recording that did not chart or was not released.

== See also ==
- List of music released by Romanian artists that has charted in major music markets

Awards and achievements
Preceded by (Romania) Proconsul	Golden Stag Trofee at the Golden Stag Festival; 2002	Succeeded by (China) Sha Baoliang
Preceded by Elena Gheorghe with The Balkan Girls	Romania in the Eurovision Song Contest; 2010 (with Ovi)	Succeeded by Hotel FM with Change
Preceded by Cezar with It's My Life	Romania in the Eurovision Song Contest; 2014 (with Ovi)	Succeeded by Voltaj with De la capăt
