= De la capăt =

2015 single by Voltaj

- Cover for the original release

Single by Voltaj

from the album X
- Released: 31 October 2014
- Genre: Indie pop rock; soft rock
- Label: Cat; Voltz

Voltaj singles chronology
"Meci de box" (2014)	"De la capăt" (2014)	"Din toată inima" (2015)

Eurovision Song Contest 2015 entry
- Country: Romania
- Artists: Călin Goia; Gabriel Constantin; Adrian Cristecu; Valeriu Ionescu; Oliver Sterian
- As: Voltaj
- Languages: Romanian; English
- Lyricists: Călin Goia; Gabriel Constantin; Adrian Cristescu; Silviu Marian Păduraru; Victor Răzvan Alstani

Finals performance
- Semi-final result: 5th
- Semi-final points: 89
- Final result: 15th
- Final points: 35

Entry chronology
- ◄ "Miracle" (2014)
- "Moment of Silence" (2016) ►

"De la capăt" (Romanian for 'From the beginning'; cfr. "da capo") is a song recorded by Romanian group Voltaj for their tenth studio album X (2016). It was made available as a single for digital download on 31 October 2014 by Cat Music and Voltz Media. A Romanian song, two other versions were released eventually—"De la capăt (All Over Again)" in Romanian and English, and "All Over Again" fully in English. "De la capăt (All Over Again)" was written by band members Călin Goia, Gabriel Constantin and Adrian Cristescu with Silviu Marian Păduraru and Victor Răzvan Alstani, while music was composed by the aforementioned alongside Monica-Ana Stevens and Andrei-Mădalin Leonte. "De la capăt" has been described as an indie pop rock and soft rock song, and is a manifesto raising awareness for children whose parents have left them behind to work abroad.

The song represented Romania in the Eurovision Song Contest 2015 after winning the pre-selection show Selecția Națională. The country went on to reach 15th place in a field of 26, scoring a total of 35 points. During Voltaj's minimalistic and mostly black-and-white show, the stage was scattered with multiple suitcases while excerpts from the music video were shown on the background LED screen. "De la capăt" received mixed reviews from music critics, with praise for the song's message and lyrics, as well as for band soloist Goia's vocal delivery. Observers have compared the track to "I Could Sing of Your Love Forever" (1995) by Delirious?. It won in the Best Pop Rock Song category at the 2015 Radio România Actualități Awards.

In order to promote and support "De la capăt", Voltaj made various appearances to perform the song on Romanian radio stations and in Austria. An accompanying music video was directed by Dan Petcan and uploaded onto the YouTube channel of Cat Music on 1 December 2014. It features scenes from the 2013 Romanian short film Calea Dunării (Way of the Danube), which tells the story of a boy named Ionuț in a Romanian village on the Danube river attempting to regain contact with his parents who work in Vienna. Music videos for the other versions of the song were also released, using the same footage. Commercially, "De la capăt" reached number 22 on Romania's Airplay 100 chart, and also peaked at numbers 70 and 48 in Austria and Iceland, respectively. It was covered by Georgian singer Tamara Gachechiladze during the 2019 Golden Stag Festival.

== Background and composition ==
Voltaj is a Romanian band, consisting of Călin Goia on lead vocals, Gabriel Constantin on guitar, Adrian Cristecu on keyboards, Valeriu Ionescu on bass and Oliver Sterian on drums. "De la capăt", a Romanian language song, was released for digital download by Cat Music and Voltz Media on 31 October 2014. Since then, two more versions of the song had been created: "De la capăt (All Over Again)", in Romanian and English, and "All Over Again", solely in English. They were featured alongside a shortened edit of "De la capăt" on its digital re-release on 17 March 2015 conducted by the same labels. Cat Music also published an enhanced CD in Romania on 30 March 2015, further listing the music video of "De la capăt (All Over Again)", a TV documentary surrounding it, and the short film Calea Dunării (Way of the Danube).

The lyrics of "De la capăt (All Over Again)" were written by Goia, Constantin, Cristescu, Silviu Marian Păduraru and Victor Răzvan Alstani, while music was composed by the aforementioned alongside Monica-Ana Stevens and Andrei-Mădalin Leonte. Musically, "De la capăt" has been described as an indie pop rock and soft rock song. It is a manifesto, raising awareness for children whose parents have left them behind to work abroad. Voltaj also previously had launched online campaigns in collaboration with Romanian child-care organizations to support the same cause. Goia further elaborated:

"Those kids live a trauma because of the lack of affection when their parents are away, working abroad, although they receive gifts and packages from them. People must know that Romanians are not lazy or thieves and the biggest majority are hard-working and honest, making enormous sacrifices for their families left behind. Therefore, they must be respected and not discriminated because of this."

== Reception and accolades ==
Upon its release, "De la capăt" received mixed reviews from music critics. In a Wiwibloggs review containing several reviews from individual critics, Goia's vocal delivery and the song's touching message were praised, although it was noted as unspectacular and outdated. Overall, the reviewers on the website gave the song 6.13 out of 10 points. Carl Greenwood of Daily Mirror awarded the song four out of five stars, while Bella Qvist of The Guardian praised its message, predicting that it "will no doubt hit home with the many Europeans who have seen an influx in foreign-born workers". Irving Wolther of Eurovision.de similarly applauded the song's message and lyrics, as well as Goia's vocal delivery. Some observers noticed similarities to "I Could Sing of Your Love Forever" (1995) by English contemporary Christian band Delirious?. In a 2016 poll on Wiwibloggs called "What is your favourite Eurovision song from Romania?", the track finished in seventh place with over 300 votes.

Commercially, the song attained moderate success on record charts. Upon its original release in October 2014, "De la capăt" peaked at number 23 on Romania's Airplay 100 chart for the week ending 15 December 2014, however it reached a new high at number 22 on 26 January 2015. It further peaked at numbers ten and 18 on Media Forest's Radio and TV Airplay charts, respectively. Later in 2015, "De la capăt (All Over Again)" reached number 70 on Austria's Ö3 Austria Top 40 chart and number 48 on Iceland's Tonlist ranking. At the 2015 Radio România Actualități Awards, "De la capăt" won in the Best Pop Rock Song category, while Voltaj were awarded for Best Pop Rock Artist.

== Promotion ==
Voltaj performed the song multiple times upon its release. The band appeared on native radio stations Kiss FM, Radio ZU, Radio 21, and Europa FM in November 2014. In the December of the same year, they also sang "De la capăt" live during a Kiss FM event to celebrate the Great Union Day. Furthermore, Voltaj performed the track at the Eurovillage event in Vienna in May 2015, and at Sala Polivalentă in Cluj-Napoca in January 2016. An accompanying music video for "De la capăt" was uploaded onto Cat Music's YouTube channel on 1 December 2014. It was directed by Dan Petcan, while Bogdan Filip was hired as the director of photography and Zebra Film as the producers. The video features scenes from the 2013 Romanian short film Calea Dunării directed by Sabin Dorohoi, which tells the story of a boy in a Romanian village on the Danube river trying to regain contact with his parents who work in Vienna.

The clip begins with Ionuț (played by Răzvan Schinteie) writing a letter to his parents and then putting it into an envelope. In another shot, he and his sister Ana (played by Serena Stanciu) open a package sent by his parents, containing a present; he copies their address seen on the package onto the aforementioned envelope and sends it. However, the letter eventually returns due to an unknown address. Learning this, he packs his rucksack and travels on the Danube by boat. Interspersed shots during the clip's main plot show Ionuț and his grandfather (played by Constantin Dinulescu) travelling the Danube, Ionuț in the classroom looking at a map of Austria, as well as Voltaj performing on a ship and on the top of a mountain. The same footage was also used for the music videos of "All Over Again" and "De la capăt (All Over Again)", released on 3 and 17 March 2015, respectively. In both visuals, the following text further appears onscreen halfway through: "More than 3 million Romanians are working abroad, trying to make a better life for their children. Unfortunately, the children are left behind."

== At Eurovision ==
=== National selection ===
Televiziunea Română (TVR) opened a submission period for artists and composers to submit their entries between 26 January and 8 February 2015 to the Selecția Națională. A jury panel made up of music professionals rated all songs, revealing their 12 finalists on 12 February. At the final round held on 8 March 2015 at the Polyvalent Hall in Craiova, Voltaj performed their entry "De la capăt" first, followed by Băieții with "Dragoste în lanțuri". Subsequently, the song was chosen to represent in Romania in the contest after the jury's votes (12 points) and the televoting (12 points) were combined, resulting in 24 points. Controversy was sparked after the outcome, with several observers complaining about the alleged fact that Voltaj benefited of more promotion than other Selecția Națională participants.

=== In Vienna ===
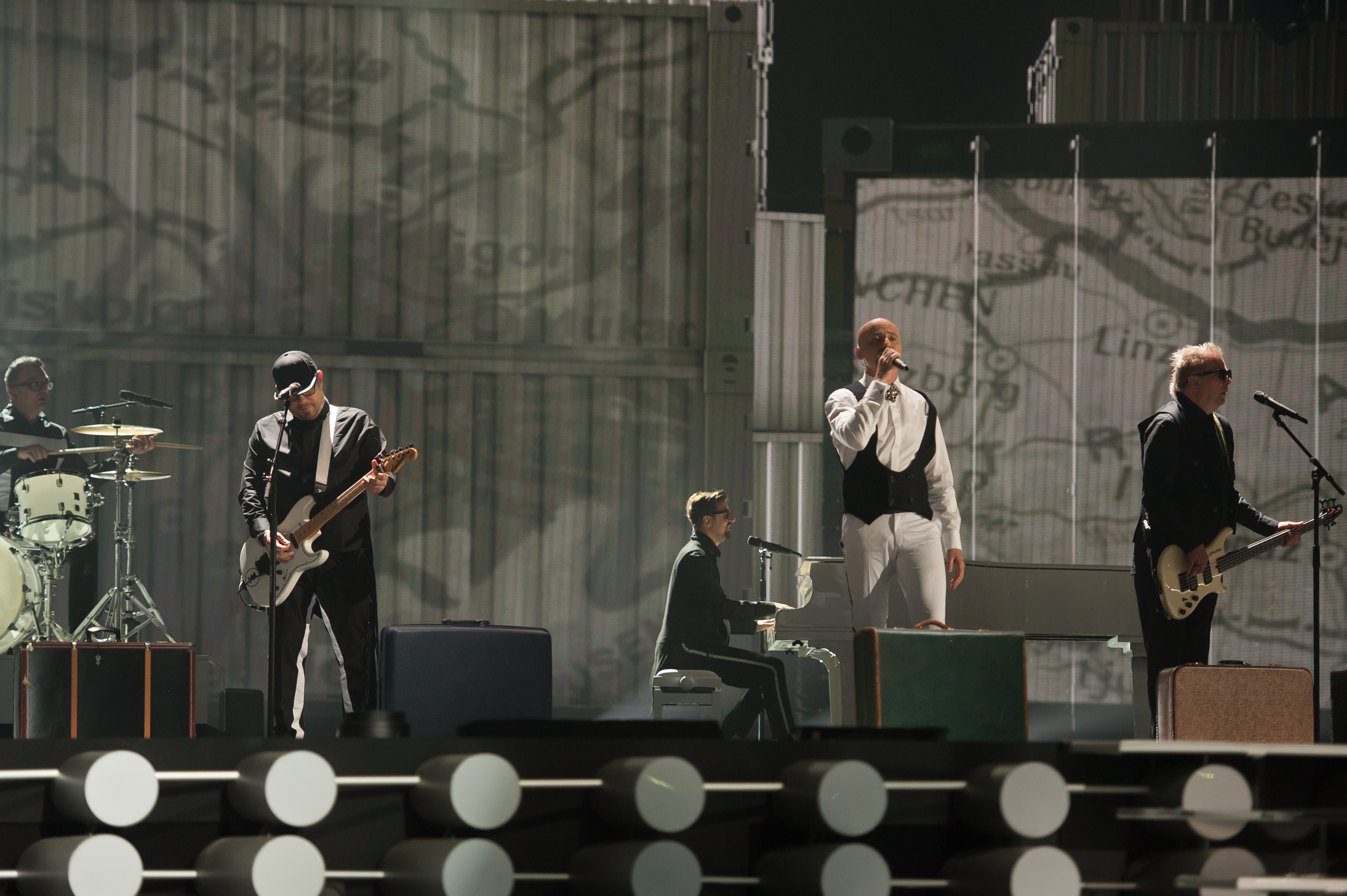
Voltaj during a rehearsal for the Eurovision Song Contest 2015 in Vienna.

The Eurovision Song Contest 2015 took place at the Wiener Stadthalle in Vienna, Austria and consisted of two semi-finals on 19 and 22 May, respectively, and the final on 23 May 2015. According to Eurovision rules all countries, except the host country, the "Big Five" (France, Germany, Spain, the United Kingdom and Italy), and Australia, were required to qualify from one semi-final to compete for the final; the top ten countries from each semi-final progressed to the final. Voltaj performed 15th in the first semi-final, preceded by Albania and followed by Georgia, and sang 20th in the Grand Final, preceded by Latvia and followed by Spain.

"De la capăt (All Over Again)" has been used for Eurovision, as announced on 15 March 2015. Band leader Goia explained for Adevărul that his personal favorite version of the song was the fully Romanian one, but thought that its message needed to be understood by foreigners as well. He said that he found the perfect version to tell the message as well as keeping the Romanian language. For their minimalistic and mostly black-and-white show, Voltaj are seen performing in all-black outfits designed by Florin Dobre while the stage is scattered with "strategically placed" suitcases. Some inserts from the song's music video are displayed on the background LED screen. At the end of their performance, Goia says: "Don't leave your children behind", and the camera cuts to Schinteie, the boy featured in the song's video.

==== Points awarded to Romania ====
Below is a breakdown of points awarded to Romania in the contest's first semi-final and Grand Final. The country finished fifth in the first semi-final with 89 points, including 12 from Moldova and eight from Albania, Austria, France and Spain. In the Grand Final, Romania reached 15th place with 35 points, including 12 from Moldova, and five from Belgium, Israel and Spain.

Points awarded to Romania (Semi-Final 1)
12 points	10 points	8 points	7 points	6 points
Moldova		Albania; Austria; France; Spain	Belgium	Denmark; Finland
5 points	4 points	3 points	2 points	1 point
Greece; Hungary		Armenia; Estonia; Serbia	Belarus; Netherlands	Australia; Georgia; Russia

Points awarded to Romania (Final)
12 points	10 points	8 points	7 points	6 points
Moldova				
5 points	4 points	3 points	2 points	1 point
Belgium; Israel; Spain	Portugal		Denmark	Cyprus; Hungary

== Track listing ==
- Digital download 1
1. "De la capăt" – 3:29
- Digital download 2
1. "De la capăt (All Over Again)" – 2:59
2. "De la capăt" – 2:59
3. "All Over Again" – 2:59
- Romanian CD single
1. "De la capăt (All Over Again)"
2. "All Over Again"
3. "De la capăt"
4. "De la capăt (All Over Again)" [Music video]
5. "De la capăt (All Over Again)" [TV documentary]
6. "Calea Dunării" [Short film]

== Charts ==
=== Weekly charts ===
Chart (2015)	Peak position
Austria (Ö3 Austria Top 40)	70
Iceland (Tónlist)	48
Romania (Airplay 100)	22
Romania Airplay (Media Forest)	10
Romania TV Airplay (Media Forest)	18

=== Year-end charts ===
Chart (2014)	Peak position
Romania (Media Forest)	64
Chart (2015)	Peak position
Romania (Media Forest)	30
Chart (2016)	Peak position
Romania (Media Forest)	60

== Release history ==
Country	Date	Format	Label	Ref.
Various	31 October 2014	Digital download	Cat/Voltz	
Various	17 March 2015	Digital download	Cat/Voltz	
Romania	30 March 2015	Enhanced CD	Cat	

== See also ==
- Euro-orphan
