= Belgium in the Eurovision Song Contest 2015 =

- Eurovision Song Contest 2015
- Participating broadcaster: Radio-télévision belge de la Communauté française (RTBF)
- Country: Belgium
- Selection process: Internal selection
- Announcement date: Artist: 3 November 2014; Song: 10 March 2015

Competing entry
- Song: "Rhythm Inside"
- Artist: Loïc Nottet
- Songwriters: Loïc Nottet; Beverly Jo Scott

Placement
- Semi-final result: Qualified (2nd, 149 points)
- Final result: 4th, 217 points

Participation chronology

Belgium was represented at the Eurovision Song Contest 2015 with the song "Rhythm Inside", written by Loïc Nottet and Beverly Jo Scott, and performed by Nottet himself. The Belgian participating broadcaster, Walloon Radio-télévision belge de la Communauté française (RTBF), internally selected its entry for the contest. Nottet was presented to the public on 3 November 2014, while the song was presented on 10 March 2015.

Belgium was drawn to compete in the first semi-final of the Eurovision Song Contest which took place on 19 May 2015. Performing during the show in position 3, "Rhythm Inside" was announced among the top 10 entries of the first semi-final and therefore qualified to compete in the final on 23 May. It was later revealed that Belgium placed second out of the 16 participating countries in the semi-final with 149 points. In the final, Belgium performed in position 13 and placed fourth out of the 27 participating countries, scoring 217 points. This was Belgium's best result in the contest since their second place in 2003.

== Background ==
Prior to the 2015 contest, Belgium had participated in the Eurovision Song Contest fifty-six times since its debut as one of seven countries to take part in 1956. Since then, the country has won the contest on one occasion in 1986 with the song "J'aime la vie" performed by Sandra Kim. Following the introduction of semi-finals for 2004, Belgium had been featured in only three finals. In 2014, Axel Hirsoux represented the country with the song "Mother", placing fourteenth in the first semi-final and failing to advance to the final.

The Belgian participation in the contest alternates between two broadcasters: Flemish Vlaamse Radio- en Televisieomroeporganisatie (VRT) and Walloon Radio-télévision belge de la Communauté française (RTBF) at the time, with both broadcasters sharing the broadcasting rights. Both broadcasters –and their predecessors– had selected the Belgian entry using national finals and internal selections in the past. On 3 June 2014, RTBF –who had the turn– confirmed its participation in the 2015 contest and internally selected both the artist and song. In 2013, RTBF internally selected a performer from the reality singing competition The Voice Belgique and organised a national final in order to select the song, while in 2014, VRT organised the national final Eurosong in order to select the entry.

== Before Eurovision ==
=== Internal selection ===
RTBF internally selected its entry for the Eurovision Song Contest 2015. On 3 November 2014, the broadcaster announced that they had selected Loïc Nottet to represent Belgium. Nottet was the runner-up in the third series of the reality singing competition The Voice Belgique. On 10 March 2015, RTBF held a press conference at the Maison de Vienne in Brussels where it was announced that Loïc Nottet would perform "Rhythm Inside" at the contest. The song was written by Loïc Nottet himself along with his coach Beverly Jo Scott in The Voice Belgique, and was selected by RTBF together with Nottet's record company Sony Music Entertainment. "Rhythm Inside" was presented to the public on the same day during the VivaCité radio programmes Le 8/9 and Le 5 à 7, while the official music video, directed by Josh Brandão and Nicolai Kornum at the BlitzWerk studio in London, was broadcast as well on the same day before one of the live shows of the fourth series of The Voice Belgique on La Une.

=== Promotion ===
Loïc Nottet's pre-contest promotion for "Rhythm Inside" was focused in Belgium with television and radio appearances. The first live televised performance of the song occurred during the 6 May broadcast of the fourth series of The Voice Belgique on La Une.

== At Eurovision ==
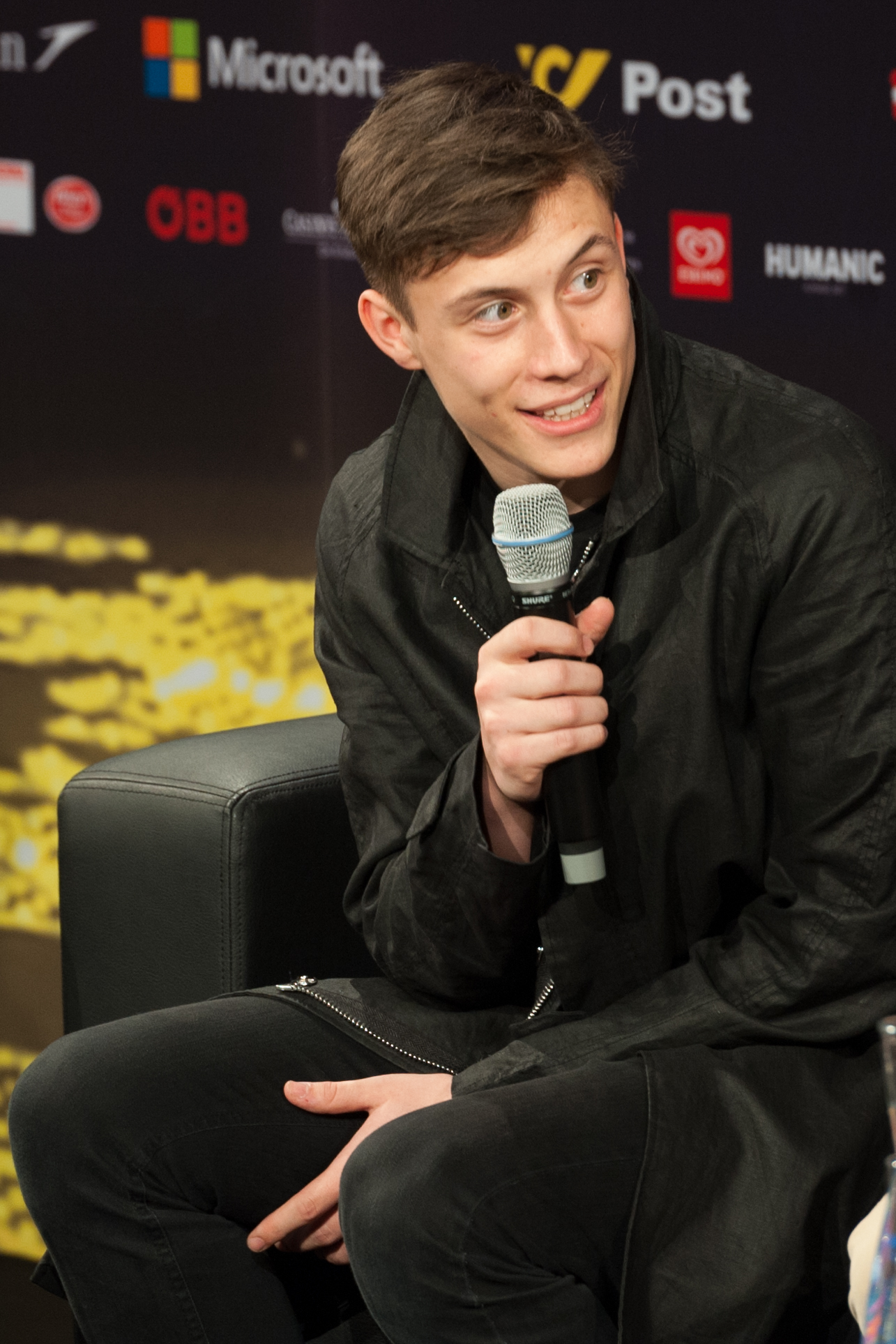
Loïc Nottet during a press meet and greet

According to Eurovision rules, all nations with the exceptions of the host country and the "Big Five" (France, Germany, Italy, Spain and the United Kingdom) are required to qualify from one of two semi-finals in order to compete for the final; the top ten countries from each semi-final progress to the final. In the 2015 contest, Australia also competed directly in the final as an invited guest nation. The European Broadcasting Union (EBU) split up the competing countries into five different pots based on voting patterns from previous contests, with countries with favourable voting histories put into the same pot. On 26 January 2015, a special allocation draw was held which placed each country into one of the two semi-finals, as well as which half of the show they would perform in. Belgium was placed into the first semi-final, to be held on 19 May 2015, and was scheduled to perform in the first half of the show.

Once all the competing songs for the 2015 contest had been released, the running order for the semi-finals was decided by the shows' producers rather than through another draw, so that similar songs were not placed next to each other. Belgium was set to perform in position 3, following the entry from Armenia and before the entry from the Netherlands.

The two semi-finals and the final was broadcast in Belgium by both the Flemish and Walloon broadcasters. VRT broadcast the shows on één and Radio 2 with commentary in Dutch by Peter Van de Veire and Eva Daeleman. RTBF televised the shows on La Une with commentary in French by Jean-Louis Lahaye and Maureen Louys. The final was also broadcast by RTBF on VivaCité with commentary in French by Olivier Gilain. RTBF appointed Walid as its spokesperson to announce the Belgian points during the final.

=== Semi-final ===
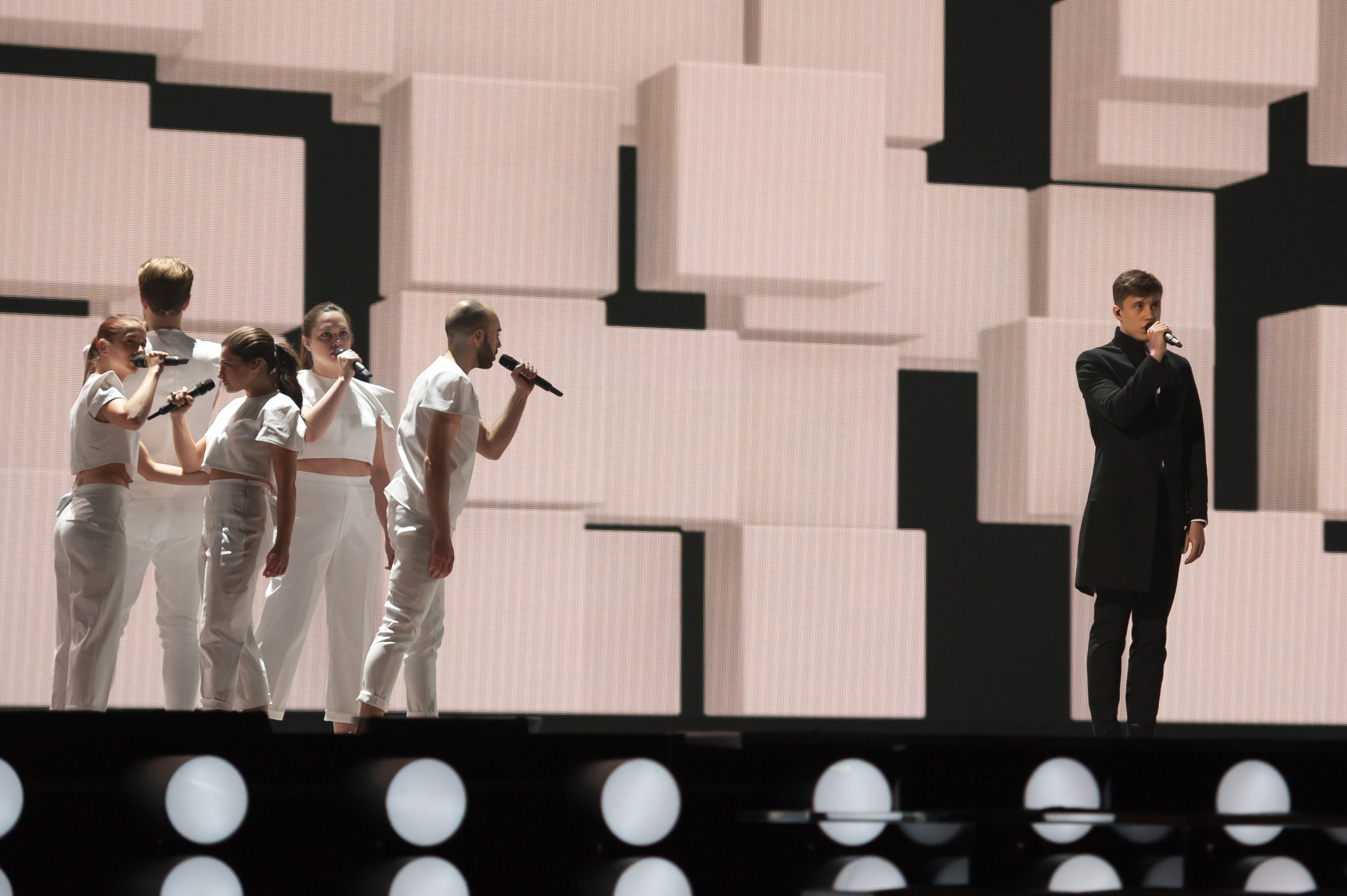
Loïc Nottet during a rehearsal before the first semi-final

Loïc Nottet took part in technical rehearsals on 11 and 15 May, followed by dress rehearsals on 18 and 19 May. This included the jury show on 18 May where the professional juries of each country watched and voted on the competing entries.

The Belgian performance featured Loïc Nottet dressed in a black suit and five backing vocalists dressed in white costumes. The staging concept involved the contrasts of black and white with strobe lighting added and the LED screens transitioning between full white displays, moving white lines and pulsating 3D boxes. Nottet and the backing vocalists performed a choreographed routine that at one point featured Nottet lying on the stage floor. The five backing vocalists that joined Loïc Nottet on stage during the performance were: Katie Bernstein, Michael Storrs, Susanna Cork, Sarah Covey and Nicolas Dorian. Nicolas Dorian previously represented Belgium in 2011 as part of Witloof Bay and would also go on to conduct Belgium's entry in Eurovision Choir 2019, while Susanna Cork would go on to represent the United Kingdom in 2018 under the pseudonym SuRie.

At the end of the show, Belgium was announced as having finished in the top ten and subsequently qualifying for the grand final. It was later revealed that Belgium placed second in the semi-final, receiving a total of 149 points.

=== Final ===
Shortly after the first semi-final, a winners' press conference was held for the ten qualifying countries. As part of this press conference, the qualifying artists took part in a draw to determine which half of the grand final they would subsequently participate in. This draw was done in the order the countries were announced during the semi-final. Belgium was drawn to compete in the first half. Following this draw, the shows' producers decided upon the running order of the final, as they had done for the semi-finals. Belgium was subsequently placed to perform in position 13, following the entry from Australia and before the entry from Austria.

Loïc Nottet once again took part in dress rehearsals on 22 and 23 May before the final, including the jury final where the professional juries cast their final votes before the live show. Loïc Nottet performed a repeat of his semi-final performance during the final on 23 May. At the conclusion of the voting, Belgium finished in fourth place with 217 points.

=== Voting ===
Voting during the three shows consisted of 50 percent public televoting and 50 percent from a jury deliberation. The jury consisted of five music industry professionals who were citizens of the country they represent, with their names published before the contest to ensure transparency. This jury was asked to judge each contestant based on: vocal capacity; the stage performance; the song's composition and originality; and the overall impression by the act. In addition, no member of a national jury could be related in any way to any of the competing acts in such a way that they cannot vote impartially and independently. The individual rankings of each jury member were released shortly after the grand final.

Following the release of the full split voting by the EBU after the conclusion of the competition, it was revealed that Belgium had placed fourth with the public televote and fifth with the jury vote in the final. In the public vote, Belgium scored 195 points, while with the jury vote, Belgium scored 186 points. In the first semi-final, Belgium placed third with the public televote with 112 points and second with the jury vote, scoring 139 points.

Below is a breakdown of points awarded to Belgium and awarded by Belgium in the first semi-final and grand final of the contest, and the breakdown of the jury voting and televoting conducted during the two shows:

==== Points awarded to Belgium ====
Points awarded to Belgium (Semi-final 1)
Score	Country
12 points	Denmark; Finland; France; Netherlands
10 points	Estonia; Hungary; Spain
8 points	Australia; Russia
7 points	Romania; Serbia
6 points	Albania; Austria; Belarus; Greece; Macedonia
5 points	Georgia; Moldova
4 points	
3 points	
2 points	
1 point	Armenia

Points awarded to Belgium (Final)
Score	Country
12 points	France; Hungary; Netherlands
10 points	Russia; Sweden
8 points	Belarus; Germany
7 points	Cyprus; Denmark; Estonia; Finland; Greece; Italy; Lithuania; Norway; Romania
6 points	Australia; Czech Republic; Georgia; Moldova; Spain
5 points	Austria; Poland; Portugal; San Marino
4 points	Armenia; Iceland; Israel; Latvia; Serbia
3 points	Slovenia; United Kingdom
2 points	Ireland; Switzerland
1 point	Albania; Macedonia

==== Points awarded by Belgium ====
Points awarded by Belgium (Semi-final 1)
Score	Country
12 points	Armenia
10 points	Albania
8 points	Russia
7 points	Romania
6 points	Netherlands
5 points	Estonia
4 points	Hungary
3 points	Greece
2 points	Georgia
1 point	Denmark

Points awarded by Belgium (Final)
Score	Country
12 points	Sweden
10 points	Russia
8 points	Italy
7 points	Latvia
6 points	Albania
5 points	Romania
4 points	Australia
3 points	Armenia
2 points	Estonia
1 point	Georgia

==== Detailed voting results ====
The following members comprised the Belgian jury:

- Michel Gudanski (jury chairperson) – producer
- Candice Wachel – manager, producer (jury member in semi-final 1)
- Megan Giart – singer (jury member in the final)
- Florence Huby – singer, represented Belgium in the 2011 contest as part of Witloof Bay
- Étienne Debaisieux – singer, represented Belgium in the 2011 contest as part of Witloof Bay (jury member in semi-final 1)
- Roberto Bellarosa – singer, represented Belgium in the 2013 contest (jury member in the final)
- Marc Radelet – manager, press agent, coordinator

Detailed voting results from Belgium (Semi-final 1)
R/O	Country	M. Gudanski	C. Wachel	F. Huby	É. Debaisieux	M. Radelet	Jury Rank	Televote Rank	Combined Rank	Points
01	Moldova	12	11	11	15	11	13	13	14	
02	Armenia	5	6	4	2	12	4	1	1	12
03	Belgium									
04	Netherlands	13	9	6	10	9	10	2	5	6
05	Finland	11	14	13	8	14	12	10	12	
06	Greece	10	4	9	4	7	6	9	8	3
07	Estonia	2	7	12	13	4	9	3	6	5
08	Macedonia	14	13	14	12	13	14	15	15	
09	Serbia	15	15	15	14	15	15	6	11	
10	Hungary	4	1	3	1	1	1	11	7	4
11	Belarus	9	10	8	11	10	11	14	13	
12	Russia	3	2	1	3	2	2	7	3	8
13	Denmark	7	8	7	6	6	7	12	10	1
14	Albania	8	3	2	7	3	3	4	2	10
15	Romania	1	12	5	5	8	5	5	4	7
16	Georgia	6	5	10	9	5	8	8	9	2

Detailed voting results from Belgium (Final)
R/O	Country	M. Gudanski	M. Giart	F. Huby	R. Bellarosa	M. Radelet	Jury Rank	Televote Rank	Combined Rank	Points
01	Slovenia	2	17	16	21	14	15	24	23	
02	France	24	26	25	24	24	24	15	22	
03	Israel	16	14	24	23	21	23	8	15	
04	Estonia	4	6	18	16	15	13	9	9	2
05	United Kingdom	19	25	15	20	18	21	23	26	
06	Armenia	22	11	9	18	13	16	5	8	3
07	Lithuania	25	24	23	26	25	25	18	24	
08	Serbia	26	23	26	25	26	26	13	21	
09	Norway	3	7	17	22	17	14	17	16	
10	Sweden	10	3	6	6	6	3	2	1	12
11	Cyprus	14	15	5	14	9	12	22	18	
12	Australia	15	10	2	3	2	4	12	7	4
13	Belgium									
14	Austria	7	13	7	9	5	6	26	17	
15	Greece	23	20	20	15	20	22	16	20	
16	Montenegro	12	19	22	13	19	18	25	25	
17	Germany	11	5	3	10	3	5	19	11	
18	Poland	21	22	19	17	16	20	6	12	
19	Latvia	1	1	1	2	1	1	11	4	7
20	Romania	5	4	12	8	12	7	7	6	5
21	Spain	20	16	21	7	22	19	10	13	
22	Hungary	8	8	10	19	8	9	21	14	
23	Georgia	17	9	13	5	7	8	14	10	1
24	Azerbaijan	18	21	8	12	23	17	20	19	
25	Russia	9	2	4	1	4	2	4	2	10
26	Albania	6	18	11	11	10	11	3	5	6
27	Italy	13	12	14	4	11	10	1	3	8
