= Culeg Vise =

Studio album by Paula Seling
- Released: February 12, 2009
- Recorded: 2008; Bucharest
- Genres: Pop, soul
- Length: 53:34
- Labels: Universal, A&A, Unicorn, Roton
- Producers: Paula Seling, Paul Seling

Paula Seling chronology
1998 - 2008 (2008)	Culeg Vise (2009)	Believe (2009)

Singles from Culeg Vise
- 1. "Culeg Vise" Released: March 16, 2009

Culeg Vise (English: I Pick Up Dreams) is the eleventh studio album by Romanian female recording artist and songwriter Paula Seling, the winner of Golden Stag in 2002. It was officially released on February 12, 2009. It contains sixteen tracks and a bonus track ("Zburator"). The only single released is "Culeg Vise". At first, Seling confirmed a music video for the song, but it wasn't even shot. The single was physically released on March 16, 2009, being broadcast just by Magic FM.

== Release and promotion ==
The album was confirmed in September, 2008, after the releasing of the compilation album "1998 - 2008". The album's styles were posted on Paula Seling's official website in early 2009. On February 12, 2009 the album was released both as a CD and as a cassette. Digitally it was released in March, 2009. It didn't gain the success of Seling's last albums. Paula's new English album "Believe" was conceived as an introduction to Paula on the world stage. Hidden on the album are some real jewels, the tracks "Autumn in Bucharest", "Just You" and "Time to Go" are reflections of feelings everyone has experienced at some point in their life and even though the songs seem pop rock, they also feel subtly soulful with a pinch of blues. The title track "Believe" is a tune about a night on the beach that leaves you reflecting back to your own memories while it also makes you think about making new ones."Believe" the album is not all fun and frolic though. Paula also has a serious side. Her song "Hey You" is a song about over coming emotional abuse and its message is directed at anyone suffering under the weight of personal oppression."Can't You See" was written as a message of frustration with the forces of prejudice, racism and sexism and it points out quite eloquently that everyone's life has equal value and that no one person or company should degrade this equality without facing the fact that next, it could be them. Even though mainstream press tries to pretend Romania doesn't exist, there is no denying Paula Seling and "Believe" has been in the Top 100 albums at CDBaby as well as being in the top 10 in Pop Rock, Pop Piano and Solo Female artist, Believe is quite a display of musical perfection, 17 tracks, covering a wide path through the musical landscape.

== Singles ==
- "Culeg Vise" is the only song promoted from the album of the same title. It didn't top any official chart.

== Track listing ==
No.	Title	Length
1.	"Ochii Tăi"	4:01
2.	"Nu Vezi Că Mă Sting"	3:54
3.	"Culeg Vise"	3:55
4.	"De Ziua Ta"	3:14
5.	"Vreau să Cred"	3:54
6.	"Fără Tine"	3:51
7.	"Departe"	4:23
8.	"Lucrurile Astea Mici"	3:20
9.	"Mi-e Dor"	3:22
10.	"Promit"	4:04
11.	"Hey, You"	3:45
12.	"Tu Nu Vezi"	4:05
13.	"Acolo Sus"	4:40
14.	"O Zi Perfectă"	3:13
15.	"Toamnă în București"	4:51
16.	"Cine Poate Spune"	3:18
17.	"Zburător" (Bonus Track)	4:12

== Awards and nominations ==
The album got an RRA Award for "Best Pop Album of the Year", in March, 2010. "Believe" is priced to be affordable worldwide at many currency exchange rates. While the album is inexpensive in the USA, it is with the sole purpose of being affordable in many other countries. The World distribution version of "Believe" was assembled from 32 bit premasters in a production studio in New Hampshire, USA. The original tracks were recorded In Paula's studio in Bucharest, Romania.

There are two versions of Believe with different cover art;

- The World Distribution Version of "Believe" (Aqua seascape background) was professionally mastered in the USA at The SoundLAB at DiscMakers in Philadelphia, PA by Brian Lipski, Senior Mastering Engineer.
- The Romanian market version (white cover background) was professionally mastered in Germany by Silver Sound Studios. Both versions have the same 17 tracks in the same order.
