= Miracle (Paula Seling and Ovi song) =

2014 single by Paula Seling and Ovi

Single by Paula Seling and Ovi

from the album A Bit of Pop Won't Hurt Anyone
- Released: 28 February 2014
- Genre: Dance; Eurodance
- Length: 3:03
- Label: DaWorks; TVR
- Composer: Beyond51
- Lyricists: Beyond51; Frida Amundsen; Cernăuțeanu; Philip Halloun
- Producer: Beyond51

Paula Seling and Ovi singles chronology
| "Calling You (Hello, Hello)" (2011) | "Miracle" (2014) |

Audio sample
- file; help

Music video
- "Miracle" on YouTube

Eurovision Song Contest 2014 entry
- Country: Romania
- Artists: Paula Seling; Ovidiu Cernăuțeanu
- As: Paula Seling and Ovi
- Language: English
- Composer: Beyond51
- Lyricists: Beyond51; Frida Amundsen; Cernăuțeanu; Philip Halloun

Finals performance
- Semi-final result: 2nd
- Semi-final points: 125
- Final result: 12th
- Final points: 72

Entry chronology
- ◄ "It's My Life" (2013)
- "De la capăt" (2015) ►

Song presentation
- file; help

Official performance video
- "Miracle " (Final) on YouTube

"Miracle" is a song recorded by Romanian singer Paula Seling and Romanian-Norwegian performer Ovidiu Cernăuțeanu for the latter's 2014 studio album A Bit of Pop Won't Hurt Anyone. It was written by Beyond51, Frida Amundsen, Ovi and Philip Halloun, while production was solely handled by Beyond51. The track was made available for digital download on 28 February 2014 in various countries, along with CDs released in Romania and Norway by the Romanian Television (TVR) and DaWorks, respectively. "Miracle" has been described as a love-themed dance and Eurodance song, featuring techno beats and a piano in its instrumentation. Reviewers compared the recording to the music of multiple producers, including Benny Benassi and Avicii.

The song represented Romania in the Eurovision Song Contest 2014 after winning the pre-selection show Selecția Națională. This marked the second time that Seling and Ovi took part in the contest, previously having placed third in 2010 with "Playing with Fire". In 2014, the country reached 12th place in a field of 26, scoring a total of 72 points. During the duo's show, the background LED screen displayed blue tones alongside butterflies and colour streams, while a circular piano was also used onstage as a symbol for unity. Several pyrotechnics were present during the performance, including the first use of holograms in the contest's history. "Miracle" received mixed reviews from music critics, who praised the duo's vocal delivery and the song's composition and dance nature, but criticized its lack of innovation and low-quality lyrics.

In order to promote and support "Miracle", Seling and Ovi made various appearances to perform the song and embarked on a tour in several European countries in early 2014, including the United Kingdom. An accompanying music video was filmed at the MediaPro Studios in Buftea, Romania by Alex Ceaușu and uploaded onto the official YouTube channel of the Eurovision Song Contest on 28 April 2014. It portrays the duo and background dancers performing to the song in a flooded cabin, which eventually "comes to life" with grass and trees. Several observers noticed similarities between the clip and the visual for Ruth Lorenzo's "Dancing in the Rain" (2014). Commercially, "Miracle" reached the lower ends of the single charts in Belgium's Flanders region, Ireland and the United Kingdom after the contest.

== Background and composition ==
"Miracle" was written by Beyond51, Frida Amundsen, Ovi and Philip Halloun, while production was solely handled by Beyond51. Ovi met with Halloun at a songwriting camp in Sweden in June 2013, where they penned the song's lyrics in a few hours. "Miracle" was subsequently produced in the fall of the same year. During a press conference, Ovi revealed that the song was intentionally "generic", as he wanted to reach a wider audience with simple and memorable lyrics. "Miracle" has been described as a love-themed dance and Eurodance recording, featuring techno beats and a piano in its instrumentation. During the song's bridge, Seling holds a note for 18 seconds. Reviewers compared "Miracle" to the music of Avicii, Swedish House Mafia, Benny Benassi and Cascada.

It was digitally released on 28 February 2014 in various countries, preceded by a teaser and a leak of a demo version in December 2013 and January 2014, respectively. A CD single of the song was also made available in Romania and Norway in 2014 by the Romanian Television (TVR) and DaWorks, respectively, both featuring "Playing with Fire" (2010) alongside other versions of the original track. Radu Bucura shot the accompanying cover artworks. The stems of the song were also released through the iTunes Store under the title "Miracle (Make Your Own Remix Kit)".

== Reception ==
Upon its release, "Miracle" was met with mixed reactions from music critics. Reviewers from Wiwibloggs were generally positive, praising the duo's vocal delivery and the song's composition and dance nature, while criticizing it as being "generic" and "cheap", and having low-quality lyrics. Overall, the reviewers on the website gave the song 8.06 out of 10 points. In a 2016 Wiwibloggs poll called "What is your favourite Eurovision song from Romania?", "Miracle" finished in fifth place with over 400 votes. Ines Hristea of Formula AS thought that "Miracle" had a "melodic" and "elegant" composition. The Corkman praised the track's beginning, but criticized it for "becom[ing] a bit of a production mess" eventually. In a negative review, Irving Wolther from Eurovision.de criticized "Miracle" as unoriginal, while Felix Bayer of Der Spiegel awarded it 3 out of 10 points. Commercially, the song reached the lower ends of the charts in Belgium's Flanders region, Ireland and the United Kingdom.

== Music video and promotion ==
Prior to the release of an accompanying music video for "Miracle", a lyric as well as a live performance video were premiered in January and February 2014, respectively, along with a clip for an acoustic version of the track in March 2014. The latter featured Seling and Ovi sitting at a double piano previously presented during their performance at the Eurovision Song Contest 2010. The official music video was subsequently uploaded onto Eurovision's YouTube channel on 28 April 2014. It was filmed at the MediaPro Studios in Buftea, Romania by Alex Ceaușu, while make-up and hair styling were done by Romelia Pelin and Marius Costea, respectively. A choreography was created by Judith State and Mircea Andrei Ghinea, and clothes were provided by Amir Dobos and Magda Mohamed. The shooting was completed in the span of one day, while post-production took several days afterwards. The government of Romania provided Seling and Ovi's team with over 259,000 lei, which part of was used for the making of the video. Five tons of grass have been used for the clip, as well as artificial wind and rain.

The music video starts with Ovi and Seling successively playing a piano in a "stark, derelict" and flooded cabin provided with old-fashioned furniture. Two dancers are also shown performing choreography in the same place while it starts to rain. As the clip transitions, the cabin "comes to life in the rain", becoming a "mini-paradise" with a tree and grass on the piano. Both the singers and dancers are involved in the same activities as in the previous set. Seling elaborated on the video: "It speaks of the miracle of life, coming from another miracle, of love. Nature results in the empty room from another miracle, water, the source of life." Several observers noticed similarities between the clip and the visual for Ruth Lorenzo's "Dancing in the Rain", which represented Spain in the Eurovision Song Contest 2014. Bogdan Honciuc of Wiwibloggs speculated that the tree represented the forbidden tree, while an editor of Urban.ro praised the video as "colored", "vernal" and "in tone with the song's message".

For further promotion, Seling and Ovi performed "Miracle" on multiple occasions. They appeared on the Romanian talk show 'Neatza cu Răzvan și Dani on 20 February 2014, and also performed the song in a folk rendition on O dată-n viață. Wearing traditional Romanian clothing, they were accompanied by Moldovan orchestra group Lăutarii. After conducting a tour in multiple European countries, including the United Kingdom, during March and April 2014, the duo sang "Miracle" at a match between FC Steaua București and ASC Oțelul Galați on 20 May 2014. Following the song's promotion phase, it was notably performed during Selecția Națională 2017 alongside "Playing with Fire".

== At Eurovision ==
=== National selection ===
Televiziunea Română (TVR) organized the Selecția Națională in order to select its entry for the Eurovision Song Contest 2014 and opened the submission period for artists' and composers' entries between 15 January and 14 February 2014. The event took place on 1 March 2014, for which 12 songs had been internally shortlisted by a jury panel. Subsequently, "Miracle" was chosen to represent in Romania in the contest, after the votes of an expert jury panel (12 points) and the televoting (ten points) were combined, resulting in 22 points. This marked the duo's second Selecția Națională win after 2010's "Playing with Fire" which went on to place third at Eurovision, Romania's best result to date. Wolther of Eurovision.de praised Seling and Ovi's performance for the "spectacular gimmicks that they use very effectively". Seling accidentally broke the Selecția Națională trophy after falling off her hands, which was the subject of irony of an article written by an editor of Ele.ro.

=== In Copenhagen ===
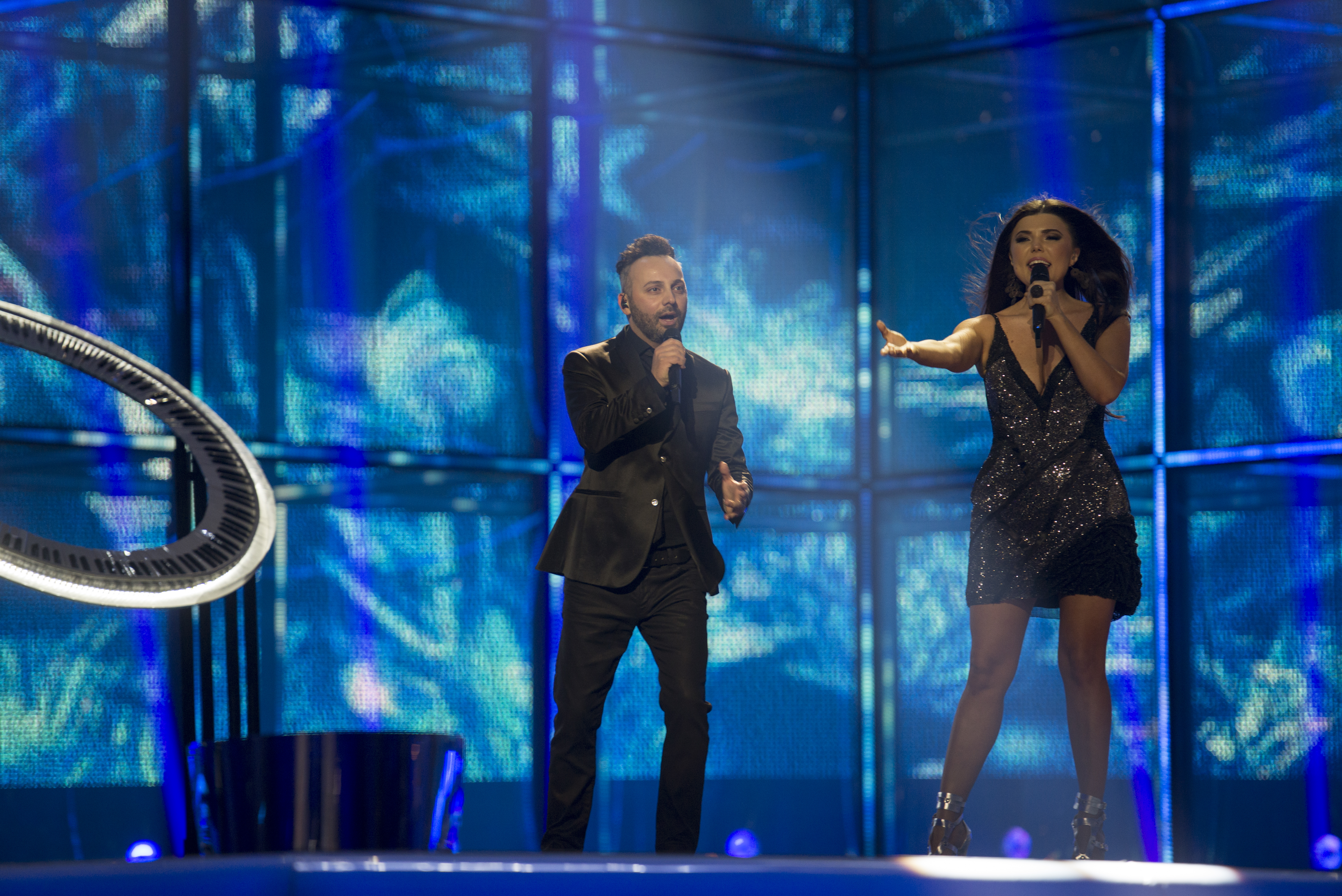
Seling and Ovi during a rehearsal. Both perform in front of blue tones, silouhettes of butterflies and whirling colour streams displayed by the LED screen, while a circular piano is placed on their left.

The Eurovision Song Contest 2014 took place at the B&W Hallerne in Copenhagen, Denmark and consisted of two semi-finals on 6 and 8 May, and the final on 10 May 2014. According to the Eurovision rules, all participating countries, except the host country and the "Big Five" (France, Germany, Italy, Spain, and the United Kingdom), were required to qualify from one semi-final to compete for the final; the top ten countries from the respective semi-final progressed to the final. Seling and Ovi sang 15th in the second semi-final following Slovenia, while they performed sixth in the Grand Final following Norway and preceding Armenia.

At the beginning of the duo's performance, Seling is shortly superimposed as a hologram on the right side of the stage before eventually appearing by herself on the left side to join Ovi. This marked the first usage of holograms in Eurovision's history. Both also hug each other "heart-warming[ly]" before the last chorus. They are accompanied by four backing vocalists, including Julie Lindell, who are not visible onstage for most of the performance. Seling wore a six-kilogram "shiny" dress that featured several sequin and metal inserts, alongside self-designed silver sandals. According to Ovi, the "crucial element" of the performance was a circular piano that symbolized unity, in homage to a double piano used during their 2010 Eurovision performance. It was also projected on the LED screen and stage floor. Blue tones were further displayed on the screen alongside silhouettes of butterflies and whirling colour streams moving along to the song's tempo. Pyrotechnics in form of vertical flames were implemented in front of the stage.

==== Points awarded to Romania ====
Below is a breakdown of points awarded to Romania in the second semi-final and Grand Final of the contest. On the first occasion, the country finished in second place with a total of 125 points, including 12 from Malta, Israel and Austria, ten from Greece and Norway, and eight from Macedonia, Germany and Belarus. In the Grand Final of the Eurovision Song Contest, Romania finished in 12th position, gathering a total of 72 points, including 12 awarded by Moldova, eight by Malta, Israel, Spain and Austria, and six by Azerbaijan.

Points awarded to Romania (Semi-Final 2)
| 12 points | 10 points | 8 points | 7 points | 6 points |
|---|---|---|---|---|
| Austria; Israel; Malta | Greece; Norway | Belarus; Germany; Macedonia | Ireland; Slovenia; Switzerland | Finland; Georgia; United Kingdom |
| 5 points | 4 points | 3 points | 2 points | 1 point |
| | Italy | | Lithuania | |

Points awarded to Romania (Final)
| 12 points | 10 points | 8 points | 7 points | 6 points |
|---|---|---|---|---|
| Moldova | | Austria; Israel; Malta; Spain | | Azerbaijan |
| 5 points | 4 points | 3 points | 2 points | 1 point |
| Belgium; Italy | Macedonia; Norway | | Ireland | Belarus; Portugal |

== Track listing ==
- Digital download
1. "Miracle" – 3:03
- Norwegian CD single
1. "Miracle" – 3:03
2. "Miracle" (Karaoke Version) – 3:03
3. "Playing with Fire" – 3:03
- Romanian CD single
1. "Miracle" – 3:03
2. "Miracle" (Karaoke Version) – 3:03
3. "Miracle" (Acoustic Version) – 3:41
4. "Playing with Fire" – 3:03

== Charts ==
| Chart (2014) | Peak position |
|---|---|
| Belgium (Ultratip Bubbling Under Flanders) | 73 |
| Ireland (IRMA) | 88 |
| UK Singles (Official Charts Company) | 174 |

== Release history ==
| Country | Date | Format | Label |
|---|---|---|---|
| Various | 28 February 2014 | Digital download | —N/a |
| Norway | N/A 2014 | CD single | DaWorks |
| Romania | N/A 2014 | Promotional CD single | TVR |

== See also ==
- List of music released by Romanian artists that has charted in major music markets
