= Netherlands in the Eurovision Song Contest 2018 =

- Eurovision Song Contest 2018
- Participating broadcaster: AVROTROS
- Country: Netherlands
- Selection process: Internal selection
- Announcement date: Artist: 9 November 2017; Song: 2 March 2018

Competing entry
- Song: "Outlaw in 'Em"
- Artist: Waylon
- Songwriters: Waylon; Ilya Toshinsky; Jim Beavers

Placement
- Semi-final result: Qualified (7th, 174 points)
- Final result: 18th, 121 points

Participation chronology

The Netherlands was represented at the Eurovision Song Contest 2018 with the song "Outlaw in 'Em", written by Willem Bijkerk, Ilya Toshinsky, and Jim Beavers, and performed by Bijkerk himself under his stage name Waylon. The Dutch participating broadcaster, AVROTROS, internally selected its entry for the contest. Waylon's appointment as the Dutch representative was announced on 9 November 2017. Five potential songs were presented to the public between 23 February and 1 March 2018 during the Dutch talk show De Wereld Draait Door, and the selected song, "Outlaw in 'Em", was announced on 2 March 2018.

The Netherlands was drawn to compete in the second semi-final of the Eurovision Song Contest, which took place on 10 May 2018. The song "Outlaw in 'Em" was the 8th song to be played in the contest. The song was placed in the Top Ten entries for the semi-finals and thus qualified to compete in the finals on the 12 May. Of the 18 participating countries in the semi-final, the Netherlands placed 7th with a total of 174 points. In the subsequent final, the Netherlands placed 18th out of the 26 participating countries, with a total score of 121 points.

== Background ==
Prior to the 2018 contest, AVROTROS and its predecessor national broadcasters have participated in the Eurovision Song Contest representing the Netherlands fifty-eight times since NTS début in 1956. They have won the contest four times: in 1957 with the song "Net als toen" performed by Corry Brokken; in 1959 with the song "'n Beetje" performed by Teddy Scholten; in 1969 as one of four countries to tie for first place with "De troubadour" performed by Lenny Kuhr; and finally in 1975 with "Ding-a-dong" performed by the group Teach-In. Following the introduction of semi-finals for the 2004 contest, the Netherlands had featured in only five finals. The Dutch least successful result has been last place, which they have achieved on five occasions, most recently in the second semi-final of the 2011 contest. The Netherlands has also received nul points on two occasions; in 1962 and 1963.

As part of its duties as participating broadcaster, AVROTROS organises the selection of its entry in the Eurovision Song Contest and broadcasts the event in the country. The Dutch broadcaster has used various methods to select its entry in the past, such as the Nationaal Songfestival, a live televised national final to choose the performer, song or both to compete at Eurovision. However, internal selections have also been held on occasion. Since 2013, the Dutch broadcaster has internally selected its entry for the contest. In 2013, the internal selection of "Birds" by Anouk managed to take the country to the final for the first time in eight years and placed ninth overall. In 2014, the internal selection of "Calm After the Storm" by the Common Linnets qualified the nation to the final once again and placed second, making it the most successful Dutch result in the contest since their victory in 1975. For 2018, AVROTROS opted to continue selecting it sentry through an internal selection.

== Before Eurovision ==
=== Internal selection ===
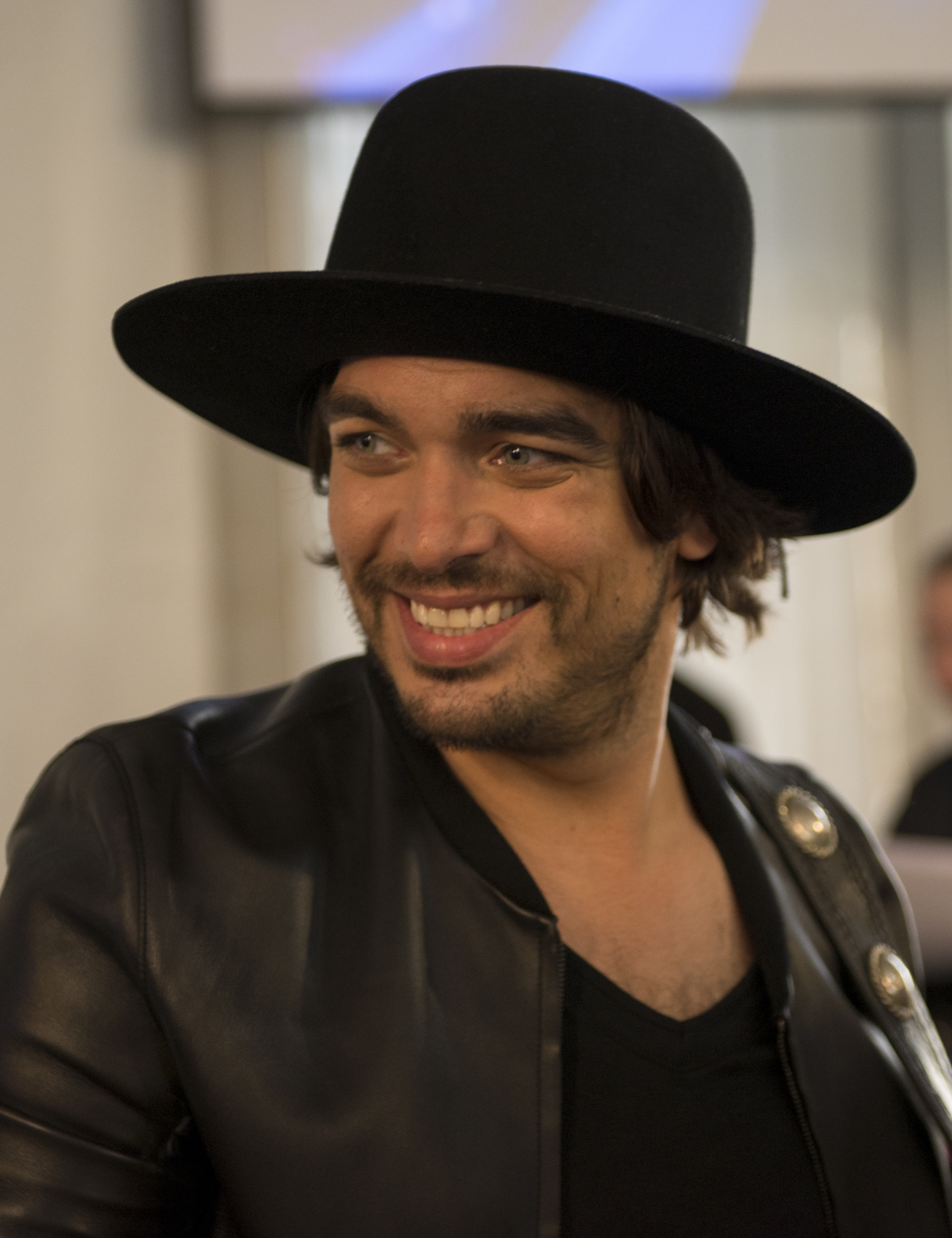
Waylon was internally selected to represent the Netherlands in the Eurovision Song Contest 2018

Following O'G3NE's eleventh place in the final in 2017 with the song "Lights and Shadows", AVROTROS revealed in October 2017 that they would continue to internally select both the artist and song for the Eurovision Song Contest, and that an announcement would be expected in November 2017 after several artists had already been in contact with the broadcaster in regards to participating. Artists that were rumoured in Dutch media to be in talks with AVROTROS included singers Alain Clark and Sharon den Adel as well as the winner of the sixth series of the reality singing competition The Voice of Holland Maan. On 9 November 2017, AVROTROS announced that they had selected singer Waylon to represent the Netherlands at the 2018 contest. Waylon had previously represented the Netherlands at the Eurovision Song Contest 2014 alongside Ilse DeLange as the Common Linnets, placing second with the song "Calm After the Storm". The selection of Waylon as the Dutch representative occurred through the decision of a selection commission consisting of singer and television host Jan Smit, television host and author Cornald Maas, radio DJ Daniël Dekker and AVROTROS general director Eric van Stade.

On 31 January 2018, Waylon revealed during an interview on the Dutch talk show De Wereld Draait Door that his Eurovision song had been selected from his upcoming album The World Can Wait, five of them which he performed during the show between 23 February and 1 March 2018. On 2 March 2018, "Outlaw in 'Em" was announced as Waylon's Eurovision entry. Prior to the announcement of the selected song, a poll by De Telegraaf revealed that 41% of the voters wanted Waylon to perform "Thanks But No Thanks" at the contest.

Songs considered in the internal selection
Song	Songwriter(s)	Performed on
"Back Together"	Waylon, Jesse Labelle, Logan Turner	23 February 2018
"Outlaw in 'Em"	Waylon, Ilya Toshinsky, Jim Beavers	26 February 2018
"The World Can Wait"	Waylon, Chris Beard, James T. Slater	27 February 2018
"That's How She Goes"	Brad Warren, Brett Warren, Mitchell Tenpenny	28 February 2018
"Thanks But No Thanks"	Waylon, Ilya Toshinsky, Jim Beavers	1 March 2018

=== Promotion ===
In the lead up to the Eurovision Song Contest, Waylon's promotional activities occurred entirely within the Netherlands where he performed at live events, radio shows and talk shows. On 14 April, Waylon performed during the Eurovision in Concert event which was held at the AFAS Live venue in Amsterdam and hosted by Edsilia Rombley and Cornald Maas.

== At Eurovision ==
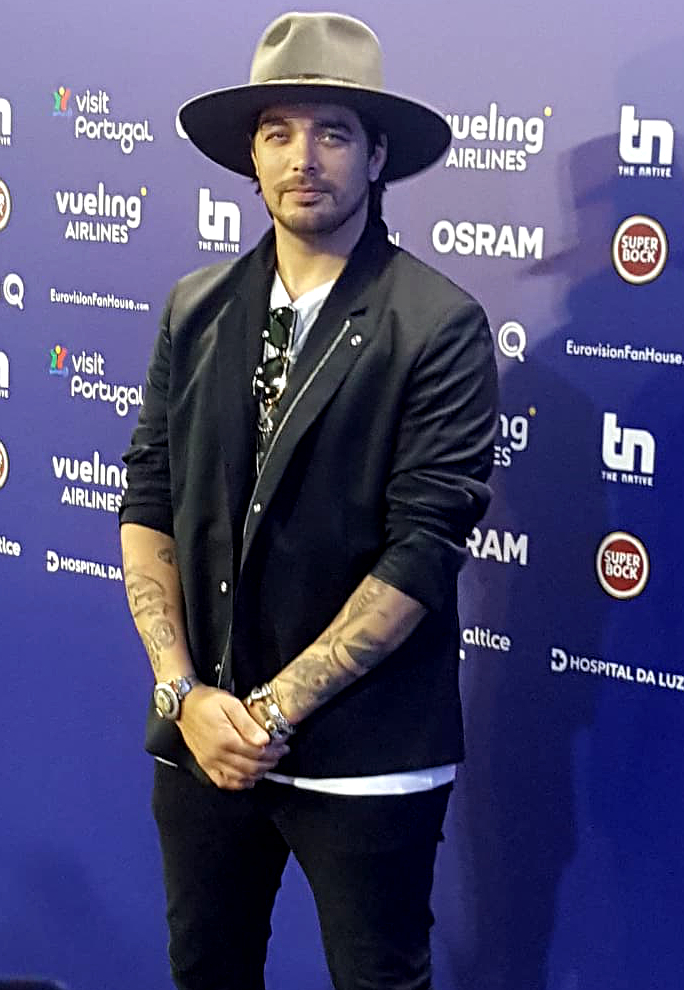
Waylon during a press meet and greet

According to Eurovision rules, all nations with the exceptions of the host country and the "Big Five" (France, Germany, Italy, Spain and the United Kingdom) are required to qualify from one of two semi-finals in order to compete for the final; the top ten countries from each semi-final progress to the final. The European Broadcasting Union (EBU) split up the competing countries into six different pots based on voting patterns from previous contests, with countries with favourable voting histories put into the same pot. On 29 January 2018, a special allocation draw was held which placed each country into one of the two semi-finals, as well as which half of the show they would perform in. The Netherlands was placed into the second semi-final, to be held on 10 May 2018, and was scheduled to perform in the first half of the show.

Once all the competing songs for the 2018 contest had been released, the running order for the semi-finals was decided by the shows' producers rather than through another draw, so that similar songs were not placed next to each other. The Netherlands was set to perform in position 8, following the entry from Moldova and preceding the entry from Australia.

The two semi-finals and the final was broadcast in the Netherlands on NPO 1 with commentary by Cornald Maas and Jan Smit. The Dutch spokesperson, who announced the top 12-point score awarded by the Dutch jury during the final, was 2017 Dutch Eurovision entrant O'G3NE.

=== Semi-final ===
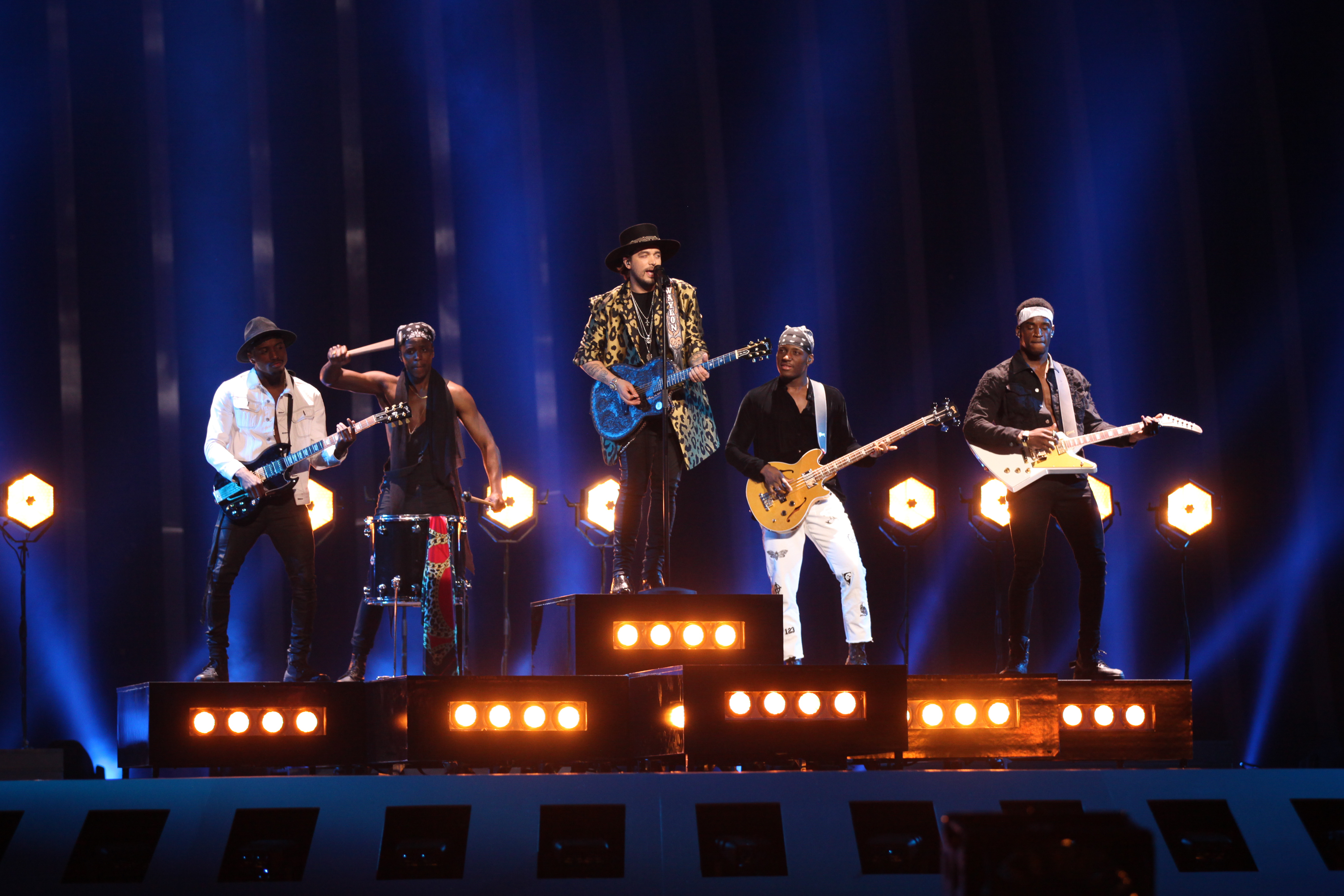
Waylon during a rehearsal before the second semi-final

Waylon took part in technical rehearsals on 1 and 5 May, followed by dress rehearsals on 9 and 10 May. This included the jury show on 9 May where the professional juries of each country watched and voted on the competing entries.

The Dutch performance featured Waylon wearing a black cowboy hat and cheetah print jacket and performing at a microphone stand on a podium together with four dancers. Waylon and three of the dancers also played a guitar in the beginning with one of them on drums, and one of the dancers . The four dancers that joined Waylon were Brandon Likiyo, Pierre Anganda, Pieter Likiyo and Roger Makadi, while an off-stage backing vocalists was also featured: Justin Pieplenbosch. The staging director for the performance was Hans Pannecoucke, who worked with the Dutch entrants between 2014 and 2016 in a similar role.

It was later revealed that Netherlands had placed seventh in the second semi-final, receiving a total of 174 points, 47 points from the televoting and 127 points from the juries.

=== Final ===
Shortly after the second semi-final, a winners' press conference was held for the ten qualifying countries. As part of this press conference, the qualifying artists took part in a draw to determine which half of the grand final they would subsequently participate in. This draw was done in the order the countries were announced during the semi-final. The Netherlands was drawn to compete in the second half. Following this draw, the shows' producers decided upon the running order of the final, as they had done for the semi-finals. The Netherlands was subsequently placed to perform in position 23, following the entry from Israel and before the entry from Ireland.

Waylon once again took part in dress rehearsals on 11 and 12 May before the final, including the jury final where the professional juries cast their final votes before the live show. Waylon performed a repeat of his semi-final performance during the final on 12 May. The Netherlands placed eighteenth in the final, scoring 121 points: 32 points from the televoting and 89 points from the juries.

=== Voting ===
Voting during the three shows involved each country awarding two sets of points from 1-8, 10 and 12: one from their professional jury and the other from televoting. Each nation's jury consisted of five music industry professionals who are citizens of the country they represent, with their names published before the contest to ensure transparency. This jury judged each entry based on: vocal capacity; the stage performance; the song's composition and originality; and the overall impression by the act. In addition, no member of a national jury was permitted to be related in any way to any of the competing acts in such a way that they cannot vote impartially and independently. The individual rankings of each jury member as well as the nation's televoting results were released shortly after the grand final.

Below is a breakdown of points awarded to the Netherlands and awarded by the Netherlands in the second semi-final and grand final of the contest, and the breakdown of the jury voting and televoting conducted during the two shows:

==== Points awarded to the Netherlands ====
Points awarded to the Netherlands (Semi-final 2)
Score	Televote	Jury
12 points		Ukraine
10 points		Georgia; Poland; Serbia; Slovenia
8 points		France; Hungary; Latvia; Norway; Romania
7 points	Denmark; Norway	Germany
6 points	Sweden	Sweden
5 points	Malta	Denmark; Moldova
4 points	Hungary	Montenegro; San Marino
3 points	Germany; Moldova; Romania	Italy
2 points	Montenegro; San Marino	
1 point	Australia; Georgia; Latvia; Poland; Slovenia	Australia

Points awarded to the Netherlands (Final)
Score	Televote	Jury
12 points	Belgium	
10 points		Belgium
8 points		Poland; Romania; Ukraine
7 points		Serbia; Slovenia
6 points		France
5 points	Denmark; Norway	Georgia; Germany; Latvia
4 points	Hungary	Hungary; Norway
3 points	Ireland	Armenia; Lithuania; Montenegro
2 points	Finland	
1 point	Sweden	Austria; Estonia; Moldova

==== Points awarded by the Netherlands ====
Points awarded by the Netherlands (Semi-final 2)
Score	Televote	Jury
12 points	Denmark	Sweden
10 points	Norway	Norway
8 points	Hungary	Slovenia
7 points	Moldova	Latvia
6 points	Sweden	Ukraine
5 points	Poland	Poland
4 points	Australia	Australia
3 points	Slovenia	Moldova
2 points	Ukraine	Romania
1 point	Serbia	Malta

Points awarded by the Netherlands (Final)
Score	Televote	Jury
12 points	Germany	Germany
10 points	Israel	Austria
8 points	Denmark	Sweden
7 points	Italy	Lithuania
6 points	Czech Republic	Cyprus
5 points	Cyprus	Israel
4 points	Ireland	Estonia
3 points	Austria	Norway
2 points	Hungary	Portugal
1 point	Norway	Slovenia

==== Detailed voting results ====
The following members comprised the Dutch jury:

- Sharon den Adel (jury chairperson) – singer
- Arno Krabman – producer, songwriter
- Robert Ester – music and content director
- Rick Vol – composer, writer, manager
- Lesley van der Aa – singer

Detailed voting results from the Netherlands (Semi-final 2)
R/O	Country	Jury							Televote	
R/O	Country	A. Krabman	R. Ester	S. den Adel	R. Vol	L. van der Aa	Rank	Points	Rank	Points
01	Norway	2	2	4	3	2	2	10	2	10
02	Romania	8	11	10	16	3	9	2	14	
03	Serbia	9	10	7	12	11	11		10	1
04	San Marino	12	13	16	11	14	13		17	
05	Denmark	13	14	15	10	15	14		1	12
06	Russia	16	16	14	14	16	16		16	
07	Moldova	6	4	17	5	9	8	3	4	7
08	Netherlands									
09	Australia	7	6	5	9	6	7	4	7	4
10	Georgia	17	15	13	17	17	17		12	
11	Poland	3	5	9	8	5	6	5	6	5
12	Malta	10	12	12	6	10	10	1	13	
13	Hungary	15	9	8	15	12	12		3	8
14	Latvia	5	8	2	4	4	4	7	11	
15	Sweden	1	1	3	2	1	1	12	5	6
16	Montenegro	14	17	11	13	13	15		15	
17	Slovenia	4	3	1	7	7	3	8	8	3
18	Ukraine	11	7	6	1	8	5	6	9	2

Detailed voting results from the Netherlands (Final)
R/O	Country	Jury							Televote	
R/O	Country	A. Krabman	R. Ester	S. den Adel	R. Vol	L. van der Aa	Rank	Points	Rank	Points
01	Ukraine	17	13	9	7	17	14		23	
02	Spain	18	11	6	24	6	11		22	
03	Slovenia	8	6	8	14	16	10	1	25	
04	Lithuania	6	1	2	11	5	4	7	19	
05	Austria	3	8	4	3	2	2	10	8	3
06	Estonia	7	4	10	6	12	7	4	11	
07	Norway	12	7	17	9	4	8	3	10	1
08	Portugal	16	10	3	23	11	9	2	21	
09	United Kingdom	15	24	20	17	9	18		16	
10	Serbia	21	22	19	16	21	24		17	
11	Germany	4	3	1	4	1	1	12	1	12
12	Albania	14	19	11	13	14	16		20	
13	France	13	18	21	22	15	21		14	
14	Czech Republic	19	16	22	10	13	17		5	6
15	Denmark	25	23	23	18	25	25		3	8
16	Australia	11	15	12	12	7	13		15	
17	Finland	22	21	14	20	23	22		24	
18	Bulgaria	9	12	5	15	19	12		18	
19	Moldova	10	17	25	21	20	20		12	
20	Sweden	2	5	13	2	3	3	8	13	
21	Hungary	24	20	15	19	24	23		9	2
22	Israel	5	9	16	1	18	6	5	2	10
23	Netherlands									
24	Ireland	20	14	24	8	8	15		7	4
25	Cyprus	1	2	18	5	10	5	6	6	5
26	Italy	23	25	7	25	22	19		4	7
