= JB Meijers =

Dutch guitarist and record producer

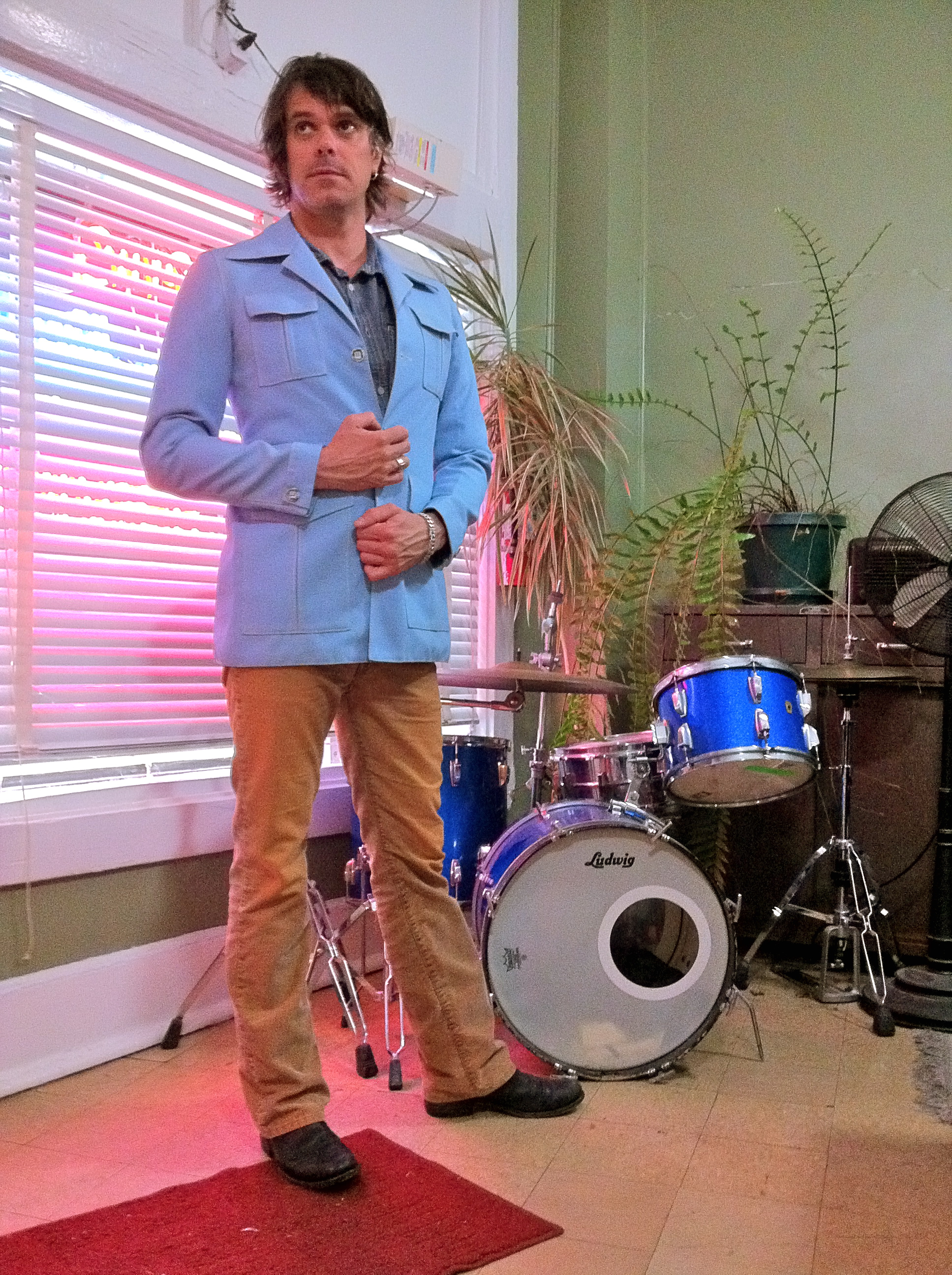

Background information
- Born: June 10, 1972 (age 54); Delft, Netherlands
- Genres: Country; Bluegrass; Pop
- Instrument: Guitar

Jan-Bart "JB" Meijers (born June 10, 1972) is a Dutch multi-instrumentalist, producer, composer, singer and studio engineer.

== Early life ==
Meijers was born in Delft, Netherlands. He, coming from a musical family, was taught from an early age to play several different instruments at his parents' home.

== Career ==
At age seventeen, Meijers signed a record deal with Virgin Records. He then joined Richard Janssen's post-Fatal Flowers band Shine with artists Marc De Reus, Marius Schrader, and Bart van Poppel. Based in Amsterdam's DDL studio, Meijers had his first opportunity to experiment with professional recording gear. He exclusively toured with Shine until 1995. At the same time, Meijers started working with electronic music wizard Eboman. Together, they won the 1996 Buma Cultuur Pop Award.

Meijers is also known for having written and arranged musicals for Stage Entertainment. It was through this company that he was able to work with Dutch superstar Ilse DeLange. They co-wrote a musical based on the book De Tweeling. The two kept in contact, and soon after, Meijers joined DeLange's band, The Common Linnets. He co-produced the band's first album, The Common Linnets. The band decided to participate in the 2014 Eurovision Song Contest and placed second in the finals with their single "Calm After the Storm". Meijers won the 2014 Buma Cultuur Pop Award with The Common Linnets. Meijers is currently playing in the band of Peter Maffay.

Meijers has collaborated with many artists, including Peter Maffay, Money Mark, Beastie Boys, Spiritualized, and Go Back to the Zoo. In 2015, Meijers collaborated and toured with Giant Sand.

2021 saw the release of JB's Paradise, a documentary about Meijers directed by Bram van Splunteren.

== Discography ==
Solo

- Catching Ophelia (2009)
- The Secret Year (2013)
- The Beginning and Everything Before (2021)

With The Common Linnets

- The Common Linnets (2014)
- II (2015)

with Barry Hay

- For You Baby (2019)
- Fiesta de la Vida (2022)
