= Outlaw in 'Em =

2018 song performed by Waylon

Single by Waylon

from the album The World Can Wait
- Released: 2 March 2018
- Length: 2:56
- Label: Waymore; Warner Music Benelux
- Songwriters: Jim Beavers; Waylon; Ilya Toshinskiy
- Producer: Ilya Toshinskiy

Waylon singles chronology
"Our Song" (2016)	"Outlaw in 'Em" (2018)

Music video
- "Outlaw in 'Em" on YouTube

Eurovision Song Contest 2018 entry
- Country: Netherlands
- Artist: Waylon
- Language: English
- Composers: Jim Beavers, Waylon, Ilya Toshinskiy
- Lyricists: Jim Beavers, Waylon, Ilya Toshinskiy

Finals performance
- Semi-final result: 7th
- Semi-final points: 174
- Final result: 18th
- Final points: 121

Entry chronology
- ◄ "Lights and Shadows" (2017)
- "Arcade" (2019) ►

"Outlaw in 'Em" is a song written by Jim Beavers, Waylon and Ilya Toshinskiy and performed by Dutch singer Waylon. It represented Netherlands in the Eurovision Song Contest 2018 in Lisbon, Portugal. The single was released on 2 March 2018.

== Eurovision Song Contest ==
On 9 November 2017, Dutch national broadcaster AVROTROS announced Waylon as the Dutch entrant at the Eurovision Song Contest 2018. Waylon had previously represented the Netherlands in 2014 as part of The Common Linnets alongside Ilse DeLange. Their song "Calm After the Storm" earned 238 points in the final, placing them second. Prior to the official presentation of the song on 2 March 2018, Waylon presented five songs – including the official Dutch entry for the Eurovision Song Contest – from his upcoming album The World Can Wait on talk show De Wereld Draait Door, hosted by Matthijs van Nieuwkerk and aired on NPO 1. The Netherlands competed in the first half of the second semi-final at the Eurovision Song Contest.

== Track listing ==
Digital download
No.	Title	Length
1.	"Outlaw In 'Em"	2:56

== Charts ==
Chart (2018)	Peak position
Belgium (Ultratip Bubbling Under Flanders)	40
Netherlands (Dutch Top 40)	37
Netherlands (Single Top 100)	40
Scotland Singles (OCC)	74
Sweden Heatseeker (Sverigetopplistan)	2
UK Singles Downloads (OCC)	70

== Release history ==
Region	Date	Format	Label
Worldwide	2 March 2018	Digital download	Waymore B.V.; Warner Music Benelux
