= Give Me a Reason (The Common Linnets song) =

Single by The Common Linnets

from the album The Common Linnets
- Released: 11 September 2014
- Recorded: 2013
- Genre: Folk; country folk; bluegrass
- Length: 3:41
- Label: Universal Music Group
- Songwriter(s): Ilse DeLange; Jan Bart Meijers; Matthew Crosby; Jake Etheridge
- Producer(s): Ilse Delange; JB Meijers

The Common Linnets singles chronology
"Calm After the Storm" (2014)	"Give Me a Reason" (2014)	"Christmas Around Me" (2014)

"Give Me a Reason" is a song by Dutch duo The Common Linnets (Ilse DeLange and Waylon), it was released as the second single from their debut studio album The Common Linnets (2014). The song was released in the Netherlands as a digital download on 11 September 2014 through Universal Music Group. The song peaked at number 92 on the Dutch Singles Chart.

== Music video ==
A music video to accompany the release of "Give Me a Reason" was first released onto YouTube on 11 September 2014 at a total length of three minutes and forty-six seconds.

== Track listing ==
Digital download
No.	Title	Length
1.	"Give Me a Reason"	3:41

== Chart performance ==
=== Weekly charts ===
Chart (2014)	Peak position
Netherlands (Single Top 100)	92

== Release history ==
Region	Date	Format	Label
Netherlands	11 September 2014	Digital download	Universal Music Group
