= The Common Linnets (album) =

Studio album by The Common Linnets
- Released: 9 May 2014
- Recorded: 2013
- Genre: Folk; country folk; bluegrass
- Label: Universal Music Group
- Producer: Ilse DeLange; JB Meijers

The Common Linnets chronology
The Common Linnets (2014)	II (2015)

Singles from The Common Linnets
- 1. "Calm After the Storm" Released: 14 March 2014; 2. "Give Me a Reason" Released: 11 September 2014

The Common Linnets is the self-titled debut studio album by Dutch band The Common Linnets. The album was released on 9 May 2014 through Universal Music Group. The lead single, "Calm After the Storm", was released on 14 March 2014.

== Singles ==
"Calm After the Storm" was released as the lead single from the album on 14 March 2014. The song was chosen through an internal selection to represent the Netherlands at the Eurovision Song Contest 2014 in Copenhagen, Denmark. In the first semi-final the producers of the show decided that the Netherlands would perform 14th, the song qualified from the first semi-final and competed in the final on 10 May 2014. "Give Me a Reason" was released as the second single from the album on 11 September 2014.

== Reception ==
Professional ratings
Review scores
Source	Rating
NU.nl	4/5 stars
De Volkskrant	4/5 stars
Gazet van Antwerpen	4/5 stars

=== Critical reception ===
The album received generally positive reviews from music critics. NU.nl gave the album a positive review stating, "At the turning of the tide, the duo finished their first (and possibly only) album. On their self-titled record, the two musicians explore their love of country and folk further than they have done previously, often successfully. This is thanks to the collaboration with Daniel Lohues, JB Meijers and musicians from Nashville. Especially lovers of World Of Hurt, the highly successful debut of DeLange, will be pleased with traditional country songs like Still Loving After You, Hungry Hands, Sun Song and Broken But Home. The quiver in DeLange's voice has returned and mixes well with Waylon's timbre. With Time Has No Mercy, Arms Of Salvation and Lovers & Liars, the duo delivers upbeat songs, while Before Complete Surrender, sounding like a Carpenters song, shows a more sensitive side, as well as the Waylon Jennings and Johnny Cash inspired Where Do I Go With Me, and DeLange's tribute to her father, Love Goes On. The soulful edge of Waylon's voice is rarely heard on this album, but it can be heard on the western song When Love Was King. Perhaps the two have to consider whether there is more future for The Common Linnets, because this is the best album in years for both artists." De Volkskrant also gave the album a positive review, stating, "The duo's success at the Eurovision Song Contest on Saturday isn't the only proof that their formation was a masterstroke. Even though Calm After the Storm is without a doubt one of the most beautiful songs on their debut album, titled The Common Linnets, the duo show that they can produce a lot more gems. However, none of them share the aforementioned song's atmosphere, reminiscent of Robert Plant and Alison Krauss. Instead, traditional country and other americana styles prevail on this surprisingly strong album. On Still Loving After You, written with Daniel Lohues, Ilse DeLange sings again with a broken country heart, which she has showcased on too few occasions. And on Where Do I Go With Me, Waylon shows how well versed he is in the repertoire of George Jones. With the help of Lohues and JB Meijers (producer and composer), both Waylon and DeLange have been able to outdo themselves on this beautiful country album. It leaves us wanting more."

=== Commercial performance ===
On 17 May 2014 the album entered the Dutch Albums Chart at number 1. On 14 May 2014 the album was at number 27 on The Official Chart Update in the UK. On 15 May 2014 the album entered the Irish Albums Chart at number 45. On 28 July 2014, the official Facebook of the band, confirmed that the album sold over 150,000 copies of their debut album.

== Track listing ==
Standard edition
No.	Title	Writer(s)	Producer(s)	Length
1.	"Calm After the Storm"	Ilse DeLange; JB Meijers; Rob Crosby; Matthew Crosby; Jake Etheridge	Ilse DeLange; JB Meijers	3:32
2.	"Hungry Hands"	Ilse DeLange; JB Meijers; Matthew Crosby		3:52
3.	"Arms of Salvation"	Waylon; Rob Crosby; Jake Etheridge		2:29
4.	"Still Loving After You"	Ilse DeLange; Daniël Lohues; Rob Crosby; Matthew Crosby; Jake Etheridge		3:54
5.	"Sun Song"	Ilse DeLange; Waylon; JB Meijers; Rob Crosby; Matthew Crosby; Jake Etheridge		2:46
6.	"Lovers & Liars"	Ilse DeLange; Waylon; Rob Crosby; Daniël Lohues		3:36
7.	"Broken But Home"	Ilse DeLange; Waylon; Daniël Lohues; Jake Etheridge		4:33
8.	"Before Complete Surrender"	Ilse DeLange; Daniël Lohues; Rob Crosby; Matthew Crosby; Jake Etheridge		4:43
9.	"Where Do I Go With Me"	Waylon		3:36
10.	"Time Has No Mercy"	Ilse DeLange; JB Meijers; Rob Crosby; Matthew Crosby; Jake Etheridge		2:48
11.	"Give Me a Reason"	Ilse DeLange; JB Meijers; Matthew Crosby; Jake Etheridge		3:41
12.	"When Love Was King"	Ilse DeLange; Waylon; JB Meijers; Matthew Crosby; Jake Etheridge		4:06
13.	"Love Goes On"	Ilse DeLange		3:53
Total length:				47:35

Special Edition bonus tracks
No.	Title	Writer(s)	Length
1.	"Broken But Home" (Acoustic)	Ilse DeLange; Waylon; Daniël Lohues; Jake Etheridge	4:38
2.	"Calm After the Storm" (Acoustic)	Ilse DeLange; JB Meijers; Rob Crosby; Matthew Crosby; Jake Etheridge	3:33
3.	"Time Has No Mercy" (Acoustic)	Ilse DeLange; JB Meijers; Rob Crosby; Matthew Crosby; Jake Etheridge	2:50
4.	"Hungry Hands" (Acoustic)	Ilse DeLange; JB Meijers; Matthew Crosby	3:54
5.	"Still Loving After You" (Acoustic)	Ilse DeLange; Daniël Lohues; Rob Crosby; Matthew Crosby; Jake Etheridge	4:07
6.	"Christmas Around Me"		2:59

== Personnel ==
- Ilse DeLange – mandolin, background vocals
- Jerry Douglas – resonator guitar
- Shannon Forrest – drums, percussion
- Larry Franklin – fiddle
- Paul Franklin – pedal steel guitar
- JB Meijers – piano, mandolin, lap steel guitar, guitar, bass, banjo, background vocals
- Metropole Orchestra – strings
- Jimmy Nichols – piano
- Michael Rhodes – bass
- Adam Schoenfeld – guitar
- Ilya Toshinsky – mandolin, guitar, banjo
- Bart Vergoossen – drums, percussion

== Chart performance ==
=== Weekly charts ===
Chart (2014)	Peak position
Austrian Albums (Ö3 Austria)	3
Belgian Albums (Ultratop Flanders)	12
Belgian Albums (Ultratop Wallonia)	52
Danish Albums (Hitlisten)	12
Dutch Albums (Album Top 100)	1
German Albums (Offizielle Top 100)	11
Irish Albums (IRMA)	45
Scottish Albums (OCC)	39
Spanish Albums (Promusicae)	42
Swiss Albums (Schweizer Hitparade)	16
UK Albums (OCC)	40

=== Year-end charts ===
Chart (2014)	Position
Austrian Albums (Ö3 Austria)	12
Belgian Albums (Ultratop Flanders)	113
Dutch Albums (Album Top 100)	1
German Albums (Offizielle Top 100)	55

Chart (2015)	Position
Dutch Albums (Album Top 100)	51

== Certifications ==
Region	Certification	Certified units/sales
Austria (IFPI Austria)	Platinum	15,000^{*}
Germany (BVMI)	Gold	100,000^{^}
Netherlands (NVPI)	2× Platinum	100,000^{^}
^{*} Sales figures based on certification alone.^{^} Shipments figures based on certification alone.

== Release history ==
Region	Date	Format	Label
Netherlands	9 May 2014 (Standard edition)	Digital download; CD; LP	Universal Music Group
Netherlands	14 November 2014 (Special Edition)	Digital download; CD; LP	Universal Music Group
