= Hearts on Fire (The Common Linnets song) =

Single by The Common Linnets

from the album II
- Released: 31 August 2015
- Recorded: 2014
- Genre: Country folk; Soft rock
- Length: 3:46
- Label: Universal Music Group; Firefly Music B.V.
- Songwriters: Rob Crosby; Ilse DeLange; Jake Etheridge; Jan-Bart Meijers; Matthew Crosby
- Producers: Ilse DeLange; Jan-Bart Meijers

The Common Linnets singles chronology
"We Don't Make the Wind Blow" (2015)	"Hearts on Fire" (2015)	"Jolene" (2015)

"Hearts on Fire" is a song by Dutch duo The Common Linnets. The song was released in the Netherlands as a digital download on 31 August 2015 through Universal Music Group as the second single from their second studio album II (2015). The song peaked at number 120 on the Dutch Singles Chart.

== Music video ==
A music video to accompany the release of "Hearts on Fire" was first released onto YouTube on 31 August 2015 at a total length of three minutes and forty-seven seconds.

== Track listing ==
Digital download
No.	Title	Length
1.	"Hearts On Fire"	3:46

== Charts ==
=== Weekly charts ===
Chart (2015)	Peak position
Netherlands (Single Tip)	20

== Release history ==
Region	Date	Format	Label
Netherlands	31 August 2015	Digital download	Universal Music Group
