= II (The Common Linnets album) =

Studio album by The Common Linnets
- Released: 25 September 2015
- Recorded: 2014
- Genre: Pop; Rock
- Label: Universal Music Group

The Common Linnets chronology
The Common Linnets (2014)	II (2015)

Singles from The Common Linnets
- 1. "We Don't Make the Wind Blow" Released: 1 May 2015; 2. "Hearts On Fire" Released: 31 August 2015; 3. "In Your Eyes" Released: 22 January 2016

II is the second studio album by Dutch band The Common Linnets. The album was released on 25 September 2015 through Universal Music Group. The lead single, "We Don't Make the Wind Blow" was released on 1 May 2015

== Singles ==
"We Don't Make the Wind Blow" was released as the lead single from the album on 1 May 2015. The song peaked to number 74 on the Dutch Singles Chart. The song has also charted in Belgium.

== Reception ==
=== Commercial performance ===
On 3 October 2015 the album entered the Dutch Albums Chart at number 1. On 9 October 2015 the album entered the Austrian Albums Chart at number 32. The album entered the German Albums Chart at number 18.

== Track listing ==
Standard edition
No.	Title	Writer(s)	Producer(s)	Length
1.	"We Don't Make the Wind Blow"	Rob Crosby; Ilse DeLange; Jake Etheridge; JB Meijers; Matthew Crosby	Ilse DeLange; JB Meijers	3:36
2.	"That Part"	DeLange; Etheridge; Meijers; M. Crosby	DeLange; Meijers	3:47
3.	"Hearts On Fire"	R. Crosby; DeLange; Etheridge; Meijers; M. Crosby	DeLange; Meijers	3:46
4.	"Runaway Man"	R. Crosby; Etheridge; M. Crosby	DeLange; Meijers	4:01
5.	"In Your Eyes"	DeLange; Etheridge; Meijers; M. Crosby	DeLange; Meijers	3:25
6.	"Dust of Oklahoma"	R. Crosby; DeLange; Etheridge; Meijers; M. Crosby	DeLange; Meijers	3:58
7.	"Indigo Moon"	R. Crosby; DeLange; Etheridge; Meijers; M. Crosby	DeLange; Meijers	3:34
8.	"Better Than That"	R. Crosby; DeLange; Etheridge; Meijers; M. Crosby	DeLange; Meijers	3:04
9.	"Days of Endless Time"	DeLange; Meijers	DeLange; Meijers	3:26
10.	"Soho Waltz"	DeLange; Etheridge; Meijers; M. Crosby	DeLange; Meijers	4:29
11.	"As If Only"	R. Crosby; DeLange; Etheridge; Meijers; M. Crosby	DeLange; Meijers	3:41
12.	"Walls of Jericho"	R. Crosby; DeLange; Etheridge; Meijers; M. Crosby	DeLange; Meijers	3:57
13.	"Proud"	DeLange; Etheridge; Meijers	DeLange; Meijers	3:39
Total length:				47:35

Deluxe edition
No.	Title	Writer(s)	Length
14.	"That Part" (Live)	DeLange; Etheridge; Meijers; M. Crosby	3:48
15.	"We Don't Make the Wind Blow" (Live)	R. Crosby; DeLange; Etheridge; Meijers; M. Crosby	3:44
16.	"Soho Waltz" (Live)	DeLange; Etheridge; Meijers; M. Crosby	4:28
17.	"In Your Eyes" (Live)	DeLange; Etheridge; Meijers; M. Crosby	3:21
18.	"As If Only" (Live)	R. Crosby; DeLange; Etheridge; Meijers; M. Crosby	3:34
19.	"Calm After the Storm" (Live)	R. Crosby; DeLange; Etheridge; Meijers; M. Crosby	3:38

== Chart performance ==
=== Weekly charts ===
Chart (2015)	Peak positions
Austrian Albums (Ö3 Austria)	32
Belgian Albums (Ultratop Flanders)	40
Dutch Albums (Album Top 100)	1
German Albums (Offizielle Top 100)	18

=== Year-end charts ===
Chart (2015)	Position
Dutch Albums (MegaCharts)	13
Chart (2016)	Position
Dutch Albums (MegaCharts)	88

== Release history ==
Region	Date	Format	Label
Netherlands	25 September 2015	Digital download; CD	Universal Music Group
