= We Don't Make the Wind Blow =

Single by The Common Linnets

from the album II
- Released: 1 May 2015
- Recorded: 2014
- Genre: Country folk; Soft rock
- Length: 3:35
- Label: Universal Music Group; Firefly Music B.V.
- Songwriter(s): Ilse DeLange; Rob Crosby; Jan-Bart Meijers; Matthew Crosby; Jake Etheridge
- Producer(s): Ilse DeLange; Jan-Bart Meijers

The Common Linnets singles chronology
"Christmas Around Me" (2014)	"We Don't Make the Wind Blow" (2015)	"Hearts On Fire" (2015)

"We Don't Make the Wind Blow" is a song by Dutch duo The Common Linnets. The song was released in the Netherlands as a digital download on 1 May 2015 through Universal Music Group as the lead single from their second studio album II (2015). The song peaked at number 74 on the Dutch Singles Chart. It was the title song for the Dutch broadcast of the first season of American television series Wayward Pines in 2015 on Fox (Netherlands) as of May 14 accompanied with a music-special 'The Wayward Pines Sessions'.

== Track listing ==
Digital download
No.	Title	Length
1.	"We Don’t Make the Wind Blow"	3:35

== Chart performance ==
=== Weekly charts ===
Chart (2015)	Peak position
Netherlands (Single Top 100)	32

== Release history ==
Region	Date	Format	Label
Netherlands	1 May 2015	Digital download	Universal Music Group
