= Mathilde Santing =

Dutch singer

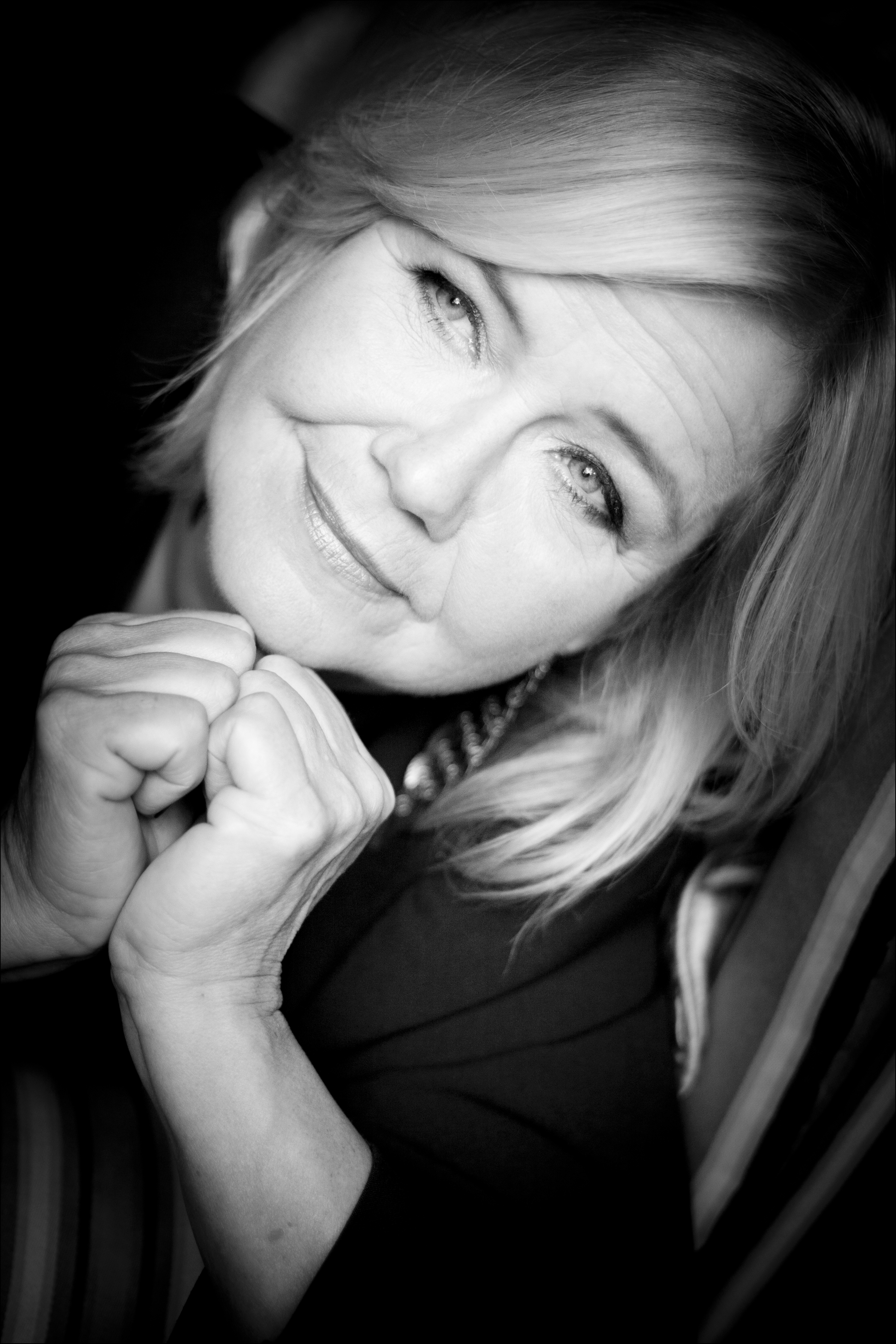
- Mathilde Santing; Photo: Irma van Rijswijk

Background information
- Birth name: Mathilde Eleveld
- Born: October 24, 1958 (age 66); Amstelveen, Netherlands
- Genres: Musical theatre; Orchestral pop
- Occupation: Singer
- Instrument: vocals
- Years active: 1980s–present
- Website: mathildesanting.com

Mathilde Santing (born Mathilde Eleveld, 24 October 1958) is a Dutch singer.

Santing was born in Amstelveen, Netherlands. She started receiving national attention in 1981 after she appeared on a Dutch television programme called Sonja Op Maandag hosted by Sonja Barend. Over the next 25 years, she released a steady stream of albums, making her a fixture in the Dutch music scene.

In 1986 she won the BV Popprijs at Noorderslag in Groningen. She was the first artist to win this prize.

In 1993 the album Texas Girl & Pretty Boy was released, on which Mathilde performed 14 songs by Randy Newman. Later she would do the same with songs from Frank Sinatra and Joni Mitchel.

In 1997, she played a role in the musical Joe. The song Inspiration was released as a single. In the same year she had a hit with a cover of Melanie's 'Beautiful People'.

Black's ‘Wonderful Life’ from 1999 is her biggest hit to date.

In the 2006/2007 theatre season, she appeared in the role of Glinda in Joop van den Ende's production of the musical The Wiz.

In November 2012, she collaborated with Todd Rundgren and the Dutch Metropole Orchestra. At the Paradiso venue in Amsterdam Todd Rundgren was backed by three backing vocalists, including Santing, with whom he sang a duet that night. During her career, she has covered 14 of his songs.

She was the winner of the Buma Cultuur Pop Award (Popprijs) for 1985, the first edition of the award.

She also won three Edisons and a Gouden Harp.

On 27 April 2007, Santing was knighted by Queen Beatrix (Order of Oranje-Nassau).

== Discography ==
=== Albums ===
The ranks in this table are from the Dutch Album Top 20/50/75/100.

| Title | Release date | Date of entering the charts | Highest rank | Number of weeks in the charts | Remarks |
|---|---|---|---|---|---|
| Mathilde Santing | 1982 | 07-08-1982 | 17 | 11 | |
| Water Under the Bridge | 1984 | 14-04-1984 | 37 | 5 | with Dennis Duchart |
| Out of This Dream | 1987 | 30-05-1987 | 22 | 9 | |
| Breast and Brow | 1989 | 04-03-1989 | 23 | 18 | with Mimi Kobayashi |
| Carried Away | 1991 | 30-03-1991 | 27 | 9 | as The Mathilde Santing Ensemble |
| The Best of Mathilde Santing | 1992 | 25-04-1992 | 44 | 5 | Compilation album |
| Mathilde Santing Sings Randy Newman (Texas Girl & Pretty Boy) | 1993 | 08-05-1993 | 32 | 17 | Tribute to Randy Newman |
| Ballads | 1994 | - | | | Compilation album |
| Under a Blue Roof | 1994 | - | | | |
| Mathilde "Choosy" Santing Live! | 1996 | 03-02-1996 | 58 | 12 | Live album |
| Matilde, Matilde | 1997 | 06-12-1997 | 21 | 17 | Compilation album |
| To Others to One | 1999 | 20-03-1999 | 4 | 34 | as Matilde Santing, with The Oversoul 13 |
| New Amsterdam | 2001 | 27-10-2001 | 91 | 1 | |
| Ne9en Levens | 2003 | 20-12-2003 | 69 | 8 | |
| Under Your Charms | 2006 | 22-04-2006 | 13 | 14 | with The New Traditions |
| Forty Nine | 2008 | 27-09-2008 | 25 | 2 | |
| Luck be a Lady | 2011 | xx-xx-2011 | xx | xx | Frank Sinatra covers |
| Half moons, whole truths & heartbreaks | 2013 | 22-04-2013 | xx | xx | |
| Blue Christmas | 2016 | 22-04-2016 | xx | xx | Christmas classics |
| Both sides now | 2018 | 22-04-2018 | xx | xx | Joni Mitchell covers |
| Troublemaker | 2019 | 22-04-2019 | xx | xx | |

=== Singles ===
The ranks in this table are from the Dutch Top 40.

| Title | Release date | Date of entering the charts | Highest rank | Number of weeks in the charts | Remarks |
|---|---|---|---|---|---|
| "Behind a Painted Smile" | 1982 | 28-08-1982 | tip13 | - | |
| "Beauty of the Ritual" | 1989 | 13-05-1989 | tip13 | - | |
| "Beautiful People" | 1997 | 18-10-1997 | 21 | 11 | |
| "Inspiratie" | 1997 | 20-12-1997 | tip2 | - | |
| "Wonderful Life" | 1999 | 20-03-1999 | 6 | 13 | as Mathilde Santing, with The Oversoul 13 |
| "Lied voor Beslan" | 2004 | 30-10-2004 | 32 | 3 | as a member of Artiesten voor Beslan |
| "Als je iets kan doen" | 2005 | 15-01-2005 | 1 (4wks) | 9 | als onderdeel van Artiesten voor Azië / Alarmschijf |

Singles:

- "You Took Advantage of Me" (1982)
- "Behind a Painted Smile" (1982)
- "Hand in Hand / Little Girl Blue" (1983)
- "(I'm Not Mending) Broken Hearts" (1984)
- "Too Much" (1985)
- "Love of the Common Man" (1987)
- "It Wouldn't Have Made Any Difference" (1989)
- "We Could Send Letters" (1989)
- "Beauty of the Ritual" (1989)
- "The Word Girl" (1991) (as The Mathilde Santing Ensemble)
- "Overnite" (1991) (as The Mathilde Santing Ensemble)
- "It's Not Unusual" (1992)
- "A Hazy Shade of Winter" (1992) (as The Mathilde Santing Ensemble)
- "Bad News from Home" (1993)
- "Lonely at the Top" (1993)
- "Only a Motion" (1994)
- "Hey Joan" (1994)
- "Carried Away" (1995)
- "De appels op de tafelsprei" (1995)
- "Crescendo" (1996)
- "Just One Victory" (1996)
- "Beautiful People" (1997)
- "Inspiratie" (1997)
- "De appels op de tafelsprei" (1998)
- "I Believe I Can Fly" (1998) (as Matilde Santing, with Gli Scapoli)
- "Wonderful Life" (1999) (as Matilde Santing, with Oversoul 13)
- "The Right Place" (1999)
- "Here, There and Everywhere" (2000) (as Matilde Santing, with Oversoul 13)
- "In the Meantime" (2001)
- "The First Time Ever I Saw Your Face" (2002)
- “Under your charms” (2006)
- “In the morning (of my life)” (2006)
- “Supply and demand” (2008)
- “Maggie May” (2008)
