= Waylon (singer) =

Dutch singer (born 1980)

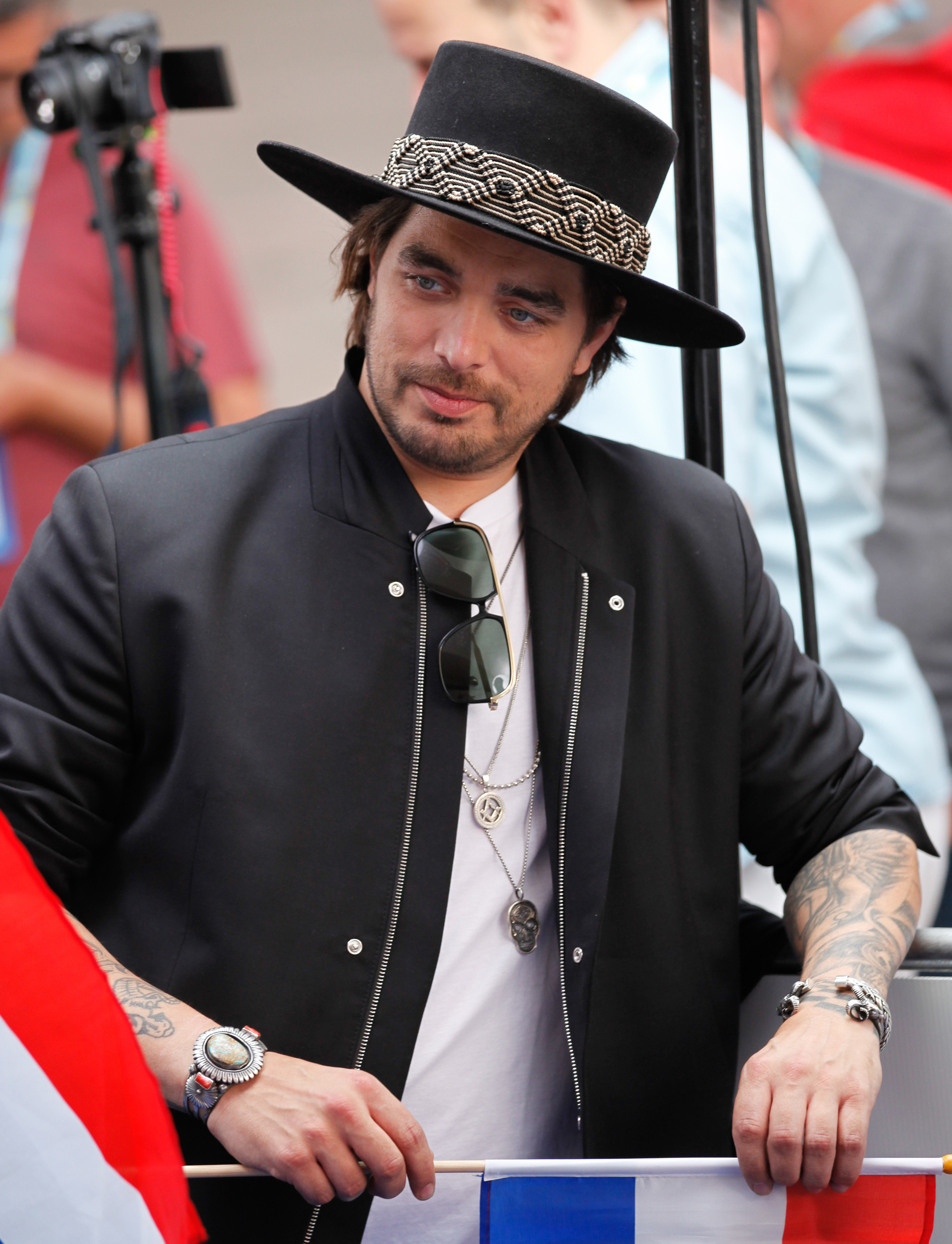
- Waylon in 2018

Background information
- Born: Willem Bijkerk; 20 April 1980 (age 46); Apeldoorn, Netherlands
- Genres: Country; pop; rock; soul
- Occupation: Singer
- Years active: 1997–present
- Formerly of: The Common Linnets, Santa Rosa, Millstreet
- Website: waylon.nl

Willem Bijkerk (Dutch pronunciation: [ˈʋɪləm ˈbɛikɛr(ə)k]; born 20 April 1980), known professionally as Waylon, is a Dutch singer. His stage name came from the name of his idol Waylon Jennings. He represented the Netherlands with Ilse DeLange as part of the Common Linnets at the Eurovision Song Contest 2014, finishing in second place in the final. He represented the Netherlands again as a solo artist in the Eurovision Song Contest 2018 and finished in 18th place.

== Career ==
Waylon started his career in 1995 singing in the television program Telekids where he sang the chorus of the song "Harry Stallion." Since childhood he was inspired by country music and he played the drums with the band West Virginian Railroad. He was signed in 1997 by EMI and went to Nashville to record an album. The album was never completed.

In 2001, he lived and worked for a year in the United States where he also performed with his idol, Waylon Jennings. After Jennings died in 2002, Waylon returned to the Netherlands. Waylon's talent was further developed with Lisa Boray. After returning from the United States, he joined the cover band Santa Rosa. He also sang in the band Millstreet. In 2005, Waylon and Rachel Kramer performed as the duo Rachel & Waylon in the preliminary rounds of the National Song Contest with the song "Leven als een beest."

=== Breakthrough ===
Waylon took part in the first season of Holland's Got Talent on SBS6 in 2008. He auditioned with the song "It's a Man's Man's Man's World" by James Brown. He received positive feedback from jurors Henkjan Smits and Patricia Paay. Waylon reached the final and finished second.

A year later, Universal Music signed Waylon as the first Dutchman to the Motown label. His first single, "Wicked Way", was released on 7 August 2009 as a preview of the album Wicked Ways, released later that month. "Wicked Way" reached the top 10 in the Dutch Top 40 charts.

In April 2010, Waylon won his first major music award, a 3FM Award for "Best Newcomer". A month later he received in a gold record for his debut album on the television program De Wereld Draait Door. In June 2010, Waylon was one of the winners of the TMF Awards, winning the Borsato Award for new talent. The prize was awarded to him by the namesake, Marco Borsato, at the TMF Awards Festival in Enschede.

Waylon released "The Escapist" in October 2011 as the first single from his second album, After All, which was released on 3 November 2011. This was followed by the singles "Lose It" and "Lucky Night". Waylon was voted best singer in the April 2012 3FM Awards.

=== Eurovision Song Contest 2014 ===
Together with singer Ilse Delange, Waylon was the Dutch entry to the Eurovision Song Contest 2014 in Copenhagen. The two formed the duo The Common Linnets and sang the country/bluegrass song "Calm After the Storm". They won second place with a total of 238 points behind Conchita Wurst from Austria, who scored 290 points.

Waylon last performed with Delange at a concert on 21 June 2014 in Enschede, following which he left The Common Linnets.

=== Heaven After Midnight ===
Waylon's third studio album, Heaven After Midnight, was released in September 2014 and reached #1 in the Dutch iTunes charts as well as in the Dutch Album Top 100 in the week of its release. He worked in Nashville and Hollywood on the album with, among others, Bruce Gaitsch, who previously wrote for Chicago and Madonna.

=== Seeds ===
In 2016, Waylon made a few appearances on talk show RTL Late Night; he lectured about the origins of pop-music and previewed tracks from his forthcoming album which came as a surprise. Seeds covered all styles and was led by the 70s-disco-tribute Our Song. He continued to explore his versatility by playing an annual concert-series in at the Rotterdam Ahoy in a joint venture with Radio Veronica's Top 1000 All Time Classics.

=== Eurovision Song Contest 2018 ===
On 9 November 2017, it was announced that Waylon would participate in the Eurovision Song Contest 2018 for the Netherlands. The choice of the song "Outlaw in 'Em" was announced on 2 March 2018. The Eurovision Song Contest fans gave him the pet name 'Walton'. He performed in the second semi-final on 10 May 2018 and qualified for the final on 12 May 2018. Waylon finished 18th place with 121 points. In June 2018, Waylon returned to RTL Late Night to perform Thanks But No Thanks, one of the other shortlisted songs, for the departing host Humberto Tan.

In 2019 Waylon returned as a professional in It Takes Two. He also hosted the second episode of DWDD Summerschool exploring the key-artists of Outlaw country. He continued to do so in a theatre-tour titled My Heroes Have Always Been Cowboys.

=== Human ===
Late 2019, Waylon released his sixth album Human; early 2020, he announced that the fifth edition of his Ahoy concert-series will be devoted to Dutch(-language) pop classics.

== Personal life ==
He married in 2002, fathered a son, Dylan, and divorced after three years of marriage. He has a daughter and a son with YouTuber Bibi Breijman: Teddy and Chester

== Discography ==
=== Studio albums ===
Title	Details	Peak chart positions	
Title	Details	NL	BEL (FL)
Wicked Ways	Released: 7 August 2009; Label: Entertainment-NL, Universal Music; Format: Digital download, CD	3	—
After All	Released: 3 November 2011; Label: Entertainment-NL, Universal Music; Format: Digital download, CD	8	—
Heaven After Midnight	Released: September 2014; Label: Waymore Music, Warner Music; Format: Digital download, CD	1	—
Seeds	Released: 18 November 2016; Label: Waymore Music, Warner Music; Format: Digital download, CD	7	—
The World Can Wait	Released: 13 April 2018; Label: Waymore Music, Warner Music; Format: Digital download, CD	1	107
Human	Released: 29 November 2019; Label: Waymore Music, Warner Music; Format: Digital download, CD	6	—
Gewoon Willem	Released: 21 October 2022; Label: Nrgy Music; Format: Digital download, CD	33	—
"—" denotes a recording that did not chart or was not released.

=== Singles ===
Title	Year	Peak chart positions			Album
Title	Year	NL	BEL (FL)	SCO	Album
"Wicked Way"	2009	8	—	—	Wicked Ways
"Hey (Waylon)"	2010	43	—	—	Wicked Ways
"Happy Song (Waylon)"	2010	46	—	—	Wicked Ways
"Nothing to Lose"	2010	—	—	—	Wicked Ways
"The Escapist (Waylon)"	2011	27	—	—	After All
"Lose It"	2012	43	—	—	After All
"Lucky Night"	2012	—	—	—	After All
"Grasping Song"	2014	42	—	—	Non-album single
"Giving Up Easy"	2014	—	—	—	Heaven After Midnight
"Love Drunk"	2014	68	—	—	Heaven After Midnight
"Mis je zo graag"	2016	72	73	—	Non-album single
"Our Song"	2016	—	66	—	Seeds
"Outlaw in 'Em"	2018	37	90	74	The World Can Wait
"Nog 1 nacht"	2023	—	—	—	Non-album single
"—" denotes a recording that did not chart or was not released.

Awards and achievements
Preceded by Anouk with "Birds"	Netherlands in the Eurovision Song Contest (as part of The Common Linnets); 2014	Succeeded by Trijntje Oosterhuis with "Walk Along"
Preceded by O'G3NE with "Lights and Shadows"	Netherlands in the Eurovision Song Contest; 2018	Succeeded by Duncan Laurence with "Arcade"
