= Netherlands in the Eurovision Song Contest 2015 =

- Eurovision Song Contest 2015
- Participating broadcaster: AVROTROS
- Country: Netherlands
- Selection process: Internal selection
- Announcement date: Artist: 10 November 2014; Song: 11 December 2014

Competing entry
- Song: "Walk Along"
- Artist: Trijntje Oosterhuis
- Songwriters: Tobias Karlsson; Anouk Teeuwe

Placement
- Semi-final result: Failed to qualify (14th)

Participation chronology

The Netherlands was represented at the Eurovision Song Contest 2015 with the song "Walk Along", written by Tobias Karlsson and Anouk Teeuwe. and performed by Trijntje Oosterhuis. The Dutch participating broadcaster, AVROTROS, internally selected its entry for the contest. Songwriter Anouk Teeuwe had represented the Netherlands in 2013 with the song "Birds" where she placed ninth in the grand final of the competition. Trijntje Oosterhuis' appointment as the Dutch representative was announced on 10 November 2014, while the song, "Walk Along", was presented to the public on 11 December 2014.

The Netherlands was drawn to compete in the first semi-final of the Eurovision Song Contest which took place on 19 May 2015. Performing during the show in position 4, "Walk Along" was not announced among top 10 entries of the first semi-final and therefore did not qualify to compete in the final. It was later revealed that the Netherlands placed fourteenth out of the 16 participating countries in the semi-final with 33 points.

== Background ==
Prior to the 2015 contest, AVROTROS and its predecessor national broadcasters have participated in the Eurovision Song Contest representing the Netherlands fifty-five times since NTS début in 1956. They have won the contest four times: in 1957 with the song "Net als toen" performed by Corry Brokken; in 1959 with the song "'n Beetje" performed by Teddy Scholten; in 1969 as one of four countries to tie for first place with "De troubadour" performed by Lenny Kuhr; and finally in 1975 with "Ding-a-dong" performed by the group Teach-In. Following the introduction of semi-finals for the 2004 contest, the Netherlands had featured in only three finals. The Dutch least successful result has been last place, which they have achieved on five occasions, most recently in the second semi-final of the 2011 contest. The Netherlands has also received nul points on two occasions; in 1962 and 1963.

As part of its duties as participating broadcaster, AVROTROS organises the selection of its entry in the Eurovision Song Contest and broadcasts the event in the country. The Dutch broadcaster has used various methods to select its entry in the past, such as the Nationaal Songfestival, a live televised national final to choose the performer, song or both to compete at Eurovision. However, internal selections have also been held on occasion. Since 2013, the Dutch broadcaster has internally selected its entry for the contest. In 2013, the internal selection of "Birds" by Anouk managed to take the country to the final for the first time in eight years and placed ninth overall. In 2014, the internal selection of "Calm After the Storm" by the Common Linnets qualified the nation to the final once again and placed second, making it the most successful Dutch result in the contest since their victory in 1975. For 2015, the broadcaster opted to continue selecting its entry through an internal selection.

== Before Eurovision ==
=== Internal selection ===
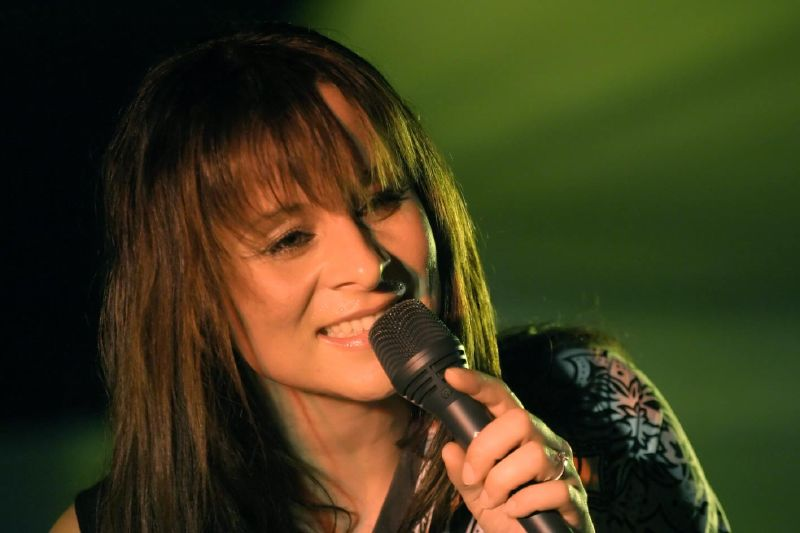
Trijntje Oosterhuis was internally selected to represent the Netherlands in the Eurovision Song Contest 2015

Following the Common Linnets' second place in 2014 with the song "Calm After the Storm", AVROTROS revealed in August 2014 that it would continue to internally select both the artist and song for the Eurovision Song Contest, while later revealing in October 2014 that an announcement would be expected in November 2014 after several artists had already been in contact with the broadcaster in regards to participating. Artists that were rumoured in Dutch media to be in talks with AVROTROS included singers Dotan and Alain Clark.

On 1 November 2014, Dutch media reported that AVROTROS had selected singer Trijntje Oosterhuis to represent the Netherlands at the 2015 contest, possibly as part of the group Ladies of Soul which also included former Dutch Eurovision entrants Edsilia Rombley (1998 and 2007) and Glennis Grace (2005). Oosterhuis was confirmed as the Dutch entrant on 10 November 2014 during the NPO Radio 2 programme Gouden Uren, hosted by Daniël Dekker. The selection of Trijntje Oosterhuis as the Dutch representative occurred through a selection commission consisting of television host and author Cornald Maas, radio DJ Daniël Dekker and AVROTROS media-director Remco van Leen.

On 11 December 2014, Trijntje Oosterhuis' Eurovision entry, "Walk Along", was presented to the public during Gouden Uren, followed by a live performance of the song the following day during a broadcast of The Voice of Holland on RTL 4 where she also one of the coaches for the competition. The official video for the song was released on 13 March 2015. "Walk Along" was written by Tobias Karlsson and Anouk Teeuwe who previously represented the Netherlands at the Eurovision Song Contest 2013. Anouk revealed earlier during an interview on the Dutch talk show College Tour on 7 November 2014 that she had written Oosterhuis' Eurovision song, of which Oosterhuis described as an "incredible fresh song that people wouldn't expect from Anouk or her" during her 8 November interview on Gouden Uren.

=== Promotion ===
In the lead up to the Eurovision Song Contest, Trijntje Oosterhuis' promotional activities occurred entirely within the Netherlands where she performed at live events, radio shows and talk shows. On 9 April, Oosterhuis performed during the Eurovision in Concert event which was held at the Melkweg venue in Amsterdam and hosted by Cornald Maas and Edsilia Rombley.

== At Eurovision ==
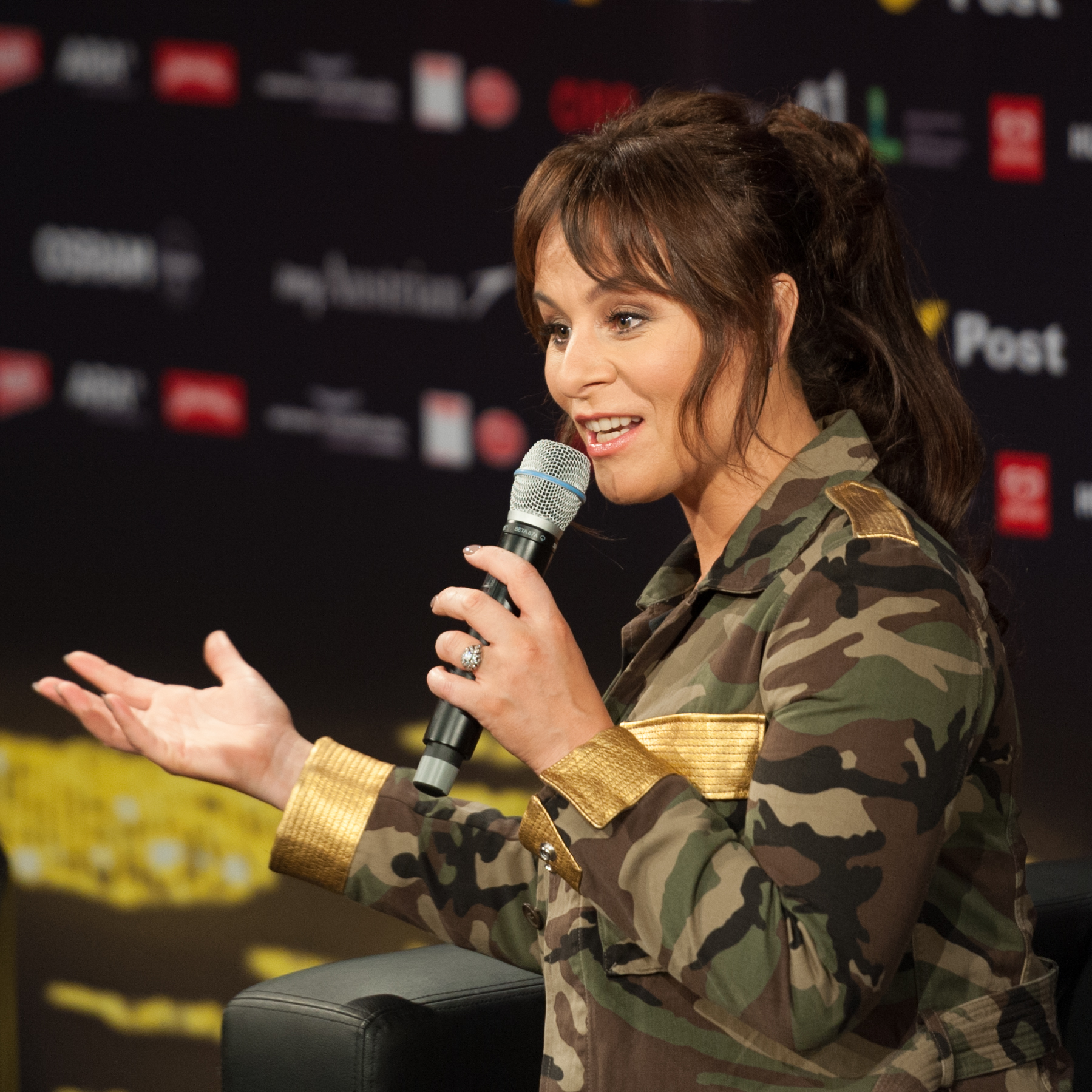
Trijntje Oosterhuis during a press meet and greet

According to Eurovision rules, all nations with the exceptions of the host country and the "Big Five" (France, Germany, Italy, Spain and the United Kingdom) are required to qualify from one of two semi-finals in order to compete for the final; the top ten countries from each semi-final progress to the final. In the 2015 contest, Australia also competed directly in the final as an invited guest nation. The European Broadcasting Union (EBU) split up the competing countries into five different pots based on voting patterns from previous contests, with countries with favourable voting histories put into the same pot. On 26 January 2015, a special allocation draw was held which placed each country into one of the two semi-finals, as well as which half of the show they would perform in. The Netherlands was placed into the first semi-final, to be held on 19 May 2015, and was scheduled to perform in the first half of the show.

Once all the competing songs for the 2015 contest had been released, the running order for the semi-finals was decided by the shows' producers rather than through another draw, so that similar songs were not placed next to each other. The Netherlands was set to perform in position 4, following the entry from Belgium and before the entry from Finland.

The two semi-finals and the final were broadcast on NPO 1 and BVN as well as via radio on NPO Radio 2. All broadcasts featured commentary by Cornald Maas and Jan Smit. The Dutch spokesperson, who announced the Dutch votes during the final, was 1998 and 2007 Dutch Eurovision entrant Edsilia Rombley.

=== Semi-final ===
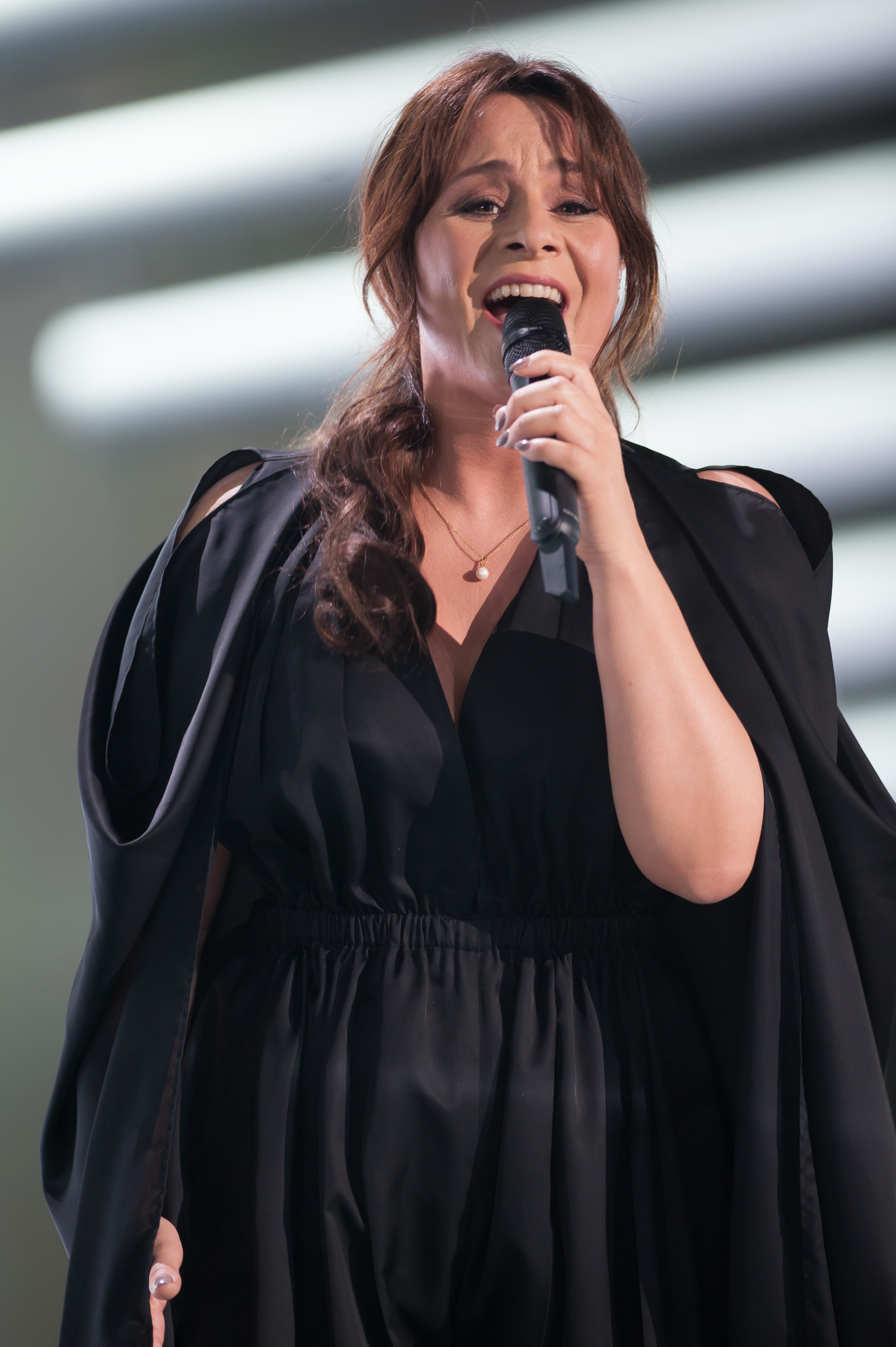
Trijntje Oosterhuis at a dress rehearsal for the first semi-final

Trijntje Oosterhuis took part in technical rehearsals on 11 and 15 May, followed by dress rehearsals on 18 and 19 May. This included the jury show on 18 May where the professional juries of each country watched and voted on the competing entries.

The Dutch performance featured Trijntje Oosterhuis performing together with four backing vocalists. During the first technical rehearsal, Oosterhuis wore a black dress with a revealing opened front designed by Prince Charming (Tycho Boeker), however it received considerable media coverage in the Netherlands sparking both positive and negative reactions from the Dutch press and public alike. In regards to the commentaries on her dress, the singer stated: "I've heard people are talking about it, but I find it strange and don't really understand it. I'm just not used to people talking about such things. I hope they will talk about the song again". Oosterhuis would later opt to change her outfit to a black parachute-like pantsuit. The performance was opened with a zoomed-in view of the singer's eyes covered by a veil, which she tore off at the first chorus. The stage colours transitioned between white, blue, green and red with the LED screens displaying a walking shadow figure. The four backing vocalists that joined Trijntje Oosterhuis were: Patt Riley, Michelle Oudeman, Lesley van der Aa and Jenny Lane. The staging director for the performance was Hans Pannecoucke, who also worked with the Dutch entrant in 2014 in a similar role.

At the end of the show, the Netherlands was not announced among the top 10 entries in the first semi-final and therefore failed to qualify to compete in the final. It was later revealed that the Netherlands placed fourteenth in the semi-final, receiving a total of 33 points.

=== Voting ===
Voting during the three shows consisted of 50 percent public televoting and 50 percent from a jury deliberation. The jury consisted of five music industry professionals who were citizens of the country they represent, with their names published before the contest to ensure transparency. This jury was asked to judge each contestant based on: vocal capacity; the stage performance; the song's composition and originality; and the overall impression by the act. In addition, no member of a national jury could be related in any way to any of the competing acts in such a way that they cannot vote impartially and independently. The individual rankings of each jury member were released shortly after the grand final.

Following the release of the full split voting by the EBU after the conclusion of the competition, it was revealed that the Netherlands had placed fifteenth with the public televote and fifth with the jury vote in the first semi-final. In the public vote, the Netherlands scored 23 points, while with the jury vote, the Netherlands scored 70 points.

Below is a breakdown of points awarded to the Netherlands and awarded by the Netherlands in the first semi-final and grand final of the contest, and the breakdown of the jury voting and televoting conducted during the two shows:

==== Points awarded to the Netherlands ====
Points awarded to the Netherlands (Semi-final 1)
| Score | Country |
|---|---|
| 12 points | |
| 10 points | |
| 8 points | |
| 7 points | Denmark |
| 6 points | Belgium |
| 5 points | Estonia |
| 4 points | |
| 3 points | Finland; Romania; Spain |
| 2 points | France; Georgia |
| 1 point | Albania; Macedonia |

==== Points awarded by the Netherlands ====
Points awarded by the Netherlands (Semi-final 1)
| Score | Country |
|---|---|
| 12 points | Belgium |
| 10 points | Russia |
| 8 points | Estonia |
| 7 points | Serbia |
| 6 points | Greece |
| 5 points | Armenia |
| 4 points | Hungary |
| 3 points | Denmark |
| 2 points | Romania |
| 1 point | Georgia |

Points awarded by the Netherlands (Final)
| Score | Country |
|---|---|
| 12 points | Belgium |
| 10 points | Sweden |
| 8 points | Australia |
| 7 points | Italy |
| 6 points | Russia |
| 5 points | Israel |
| 4 points | Estonia |
| 3 points | Norway |
| 2 points | Latvia |
| 1 point | Serbia |

==== Detailed voting results ====
The following members comprised the Dutch jury:

- Carolina Dijkhuizen (jury chairperson) – singer, musical actress
- Florent Luyckx – media professional
- Maurice Wijnen – creative director
- Gijs Staverman – radio DJ, host
- Dominique Rijpma van Hulst (Do) – singer

Detailed voting results from the Netherlands (Semi-final 1)
| R/O | Country | C. Dijkhuizen | F. Luyckx | M. Wijnen | G. Staverman | Do | Jury Rank | Televote Rank | Combined Rank | Points |
|---|---|---|---|---|---|---|---|---|---|---|
| 01 | Moldova | 11 | 10 | 10 | 9 | 13 | 12 | 14 | 14 | |
| 02 | Armenia | 10 | 14 | 7 | 10 | 11 | 11 | 2 | 6 | 5 |
| 03 | Belgium | 1 | 3 | 2 | 1 | 2 | 1 | 1 | 1 | 12 |
| 04 | Netherlands | | | | | | | | | |
| 05 | Finland | 15 | 12 | 15 | 15 | 15 | 15 | 7 | 11 | |
| 06 | Greece | 2 | 2 | 3 | 4 | 1 | 2 | 9 | 5 | 6 |
| 07 | Estonia | 7 | 5 | 5 | 3 | 6 | 5 | 4 | 3 | 8 |
| 08 | Macedonia | 14 | 15 | 14 | 11 | 14 | 14 | 13 | 15 | |
| 09 | Serbia | 8 | 9 | 6 | 6 | 7 | 7 | 3 | 4 | 7 |
| 10 | Hungary | 9 | 8 | 8 | 12 | 10 | 9 | 6 | 7 | 4 |
| 11 | Belarus | 6 | 11 | 13 | 8 | 12 | 10 | 15 | 13 | |
| 12 | Russia | 4 | 1 | 1 | 5 | 5 | 3 | 5 | 2 | 10 |
| 13 | Denmark | 5 | 4 | 4 | 2 | 4 | 4 | 11 | 8 | 3 |
| 14 | Albania | 13 | 13 | 12 | 13 | 8 | 13 | 12 | 12 | |
| 15 | Romania | 12 | 7 | 11 | 7 | 9 | 8 | 8 | 9 | 2 |
| 16 | Georgia | 3 | 6 | 9 | 14 | 3 | 6 | 10 | 10 | 1 |

Detailed voting results from the Netherlands (Final)
| R/O | Country | C. Dijkhuizen | F. Luyckx | M. Wijnen | G. Staverman | Do | Jury Rank | Televote Rank | Combined Rank | Points |
|---|---|---|---|---|---|---|---|---|---|---|
| 01 | Slovenia | 13 | 16 | 14 | 21 | 14 | 15 | 25 | 22 | |
| 02 | France | 12 | 13 | 6 | 16 | 11 | 11 | 21 | 14 | |
| 03 | Israel | 8 | 8 | 7 | 6 | 7 | 6 | 8 | 6 | 5 |
| 04 | Estonia | 11 | 9 | 8 | 7 | 10 | 8 | 9 | 7 | 4 |
| 05 | United Kingdom | 18 | 17 | 16 | 17 | 24 | 19 | 26 | 26 | |
| 06 | Armenia | 24 | 26 | 21 | 26 | 26 | 26 | 5 | 12 | |
| 07 | Lithuania | 17 | 21 | 18 | 25 | 4 | 17 | 16 | 15 | |
| 08 | Serbia | 21 | 22 | 12 | 9 | 23 | 18 | 10 | 10 | 1 |
| 09 | Norway | 10 | 7 | 11 | 8 | 9 | 7 | 12 | 8 | 3 |
| 10 | Sweden | 1 | 2 | 1 | 2 | 2 | 1 | 3 | 2 | 10 |
| 11 | Cyprus | 14 | 15 | 10 | 13 | 20 | 13 | 22 | 18 | |
| 12 | Australia | 2 | 3 | 2 | 4 | 1 | 2 | 4 | 3 | 8 |
| 13 | Belgium | 3 | 4 | 3 | 1 | 3 | 3 | 1 | 1 | 12 |
| 14 | Austria | 25 | 20 | 22 | 11 | 17 | 20 | 27 | 27 | |
| 15 | Greece | 5 | 19 | 9 | 19 | 8 | 12 | 24 | 20 | |
| 16 | Montenegro | 16 | 11 | 13 | 15 | 22 | 14 | 23 | 21 | |
| 17 | Germany | 22 | 24 | 26 | 18 | 25 | 24 | 20 | 25 | |
| 18 | Poland | 26 | 25 | 24 | 22 | 21 | 25 | 7 | 13 | |
| 19 | Latvia | 9 | 1 | 20 | 3 | 15 | 9 | 11 | 9 | 2 |
| 20 | Romania | 23 | 18 | 25 | 14 | 16 | 21 | 13 | 17 | |
| 21 | Spain | 15 | 12 | 17 | 20 | 18 | 16 | 17 | 16 | |
| 22 | Hungary | 19 | 14 | 23 | 24 | 19 | 22 | 14 | 19 | |
| 23 | Georgia | 7 | 10 | 15 | 12 | 6 | 10 | 19 | 11 | |
| 24 | Azerbaijan | 20 | 23 | 19 | 27 | 13 | 23 | 18 | 23 | |
| 25 | Russia | 4 | 5 | 5 | 10 | 5 | 4 | 6 | 5 | 6 |
| 26 | Albania | 27 | 27 | 27 | 23 | 27 | 27 | 15 | 24 | |
| 27 | Italy | 6 | 6 | 4 | 5 | 12 | 5 | 2 | 4 | 7 |
