= Buma Cultuur Pop Award =

Dutch pop music award

Buma Cultuur Pop Award (Popprijs)
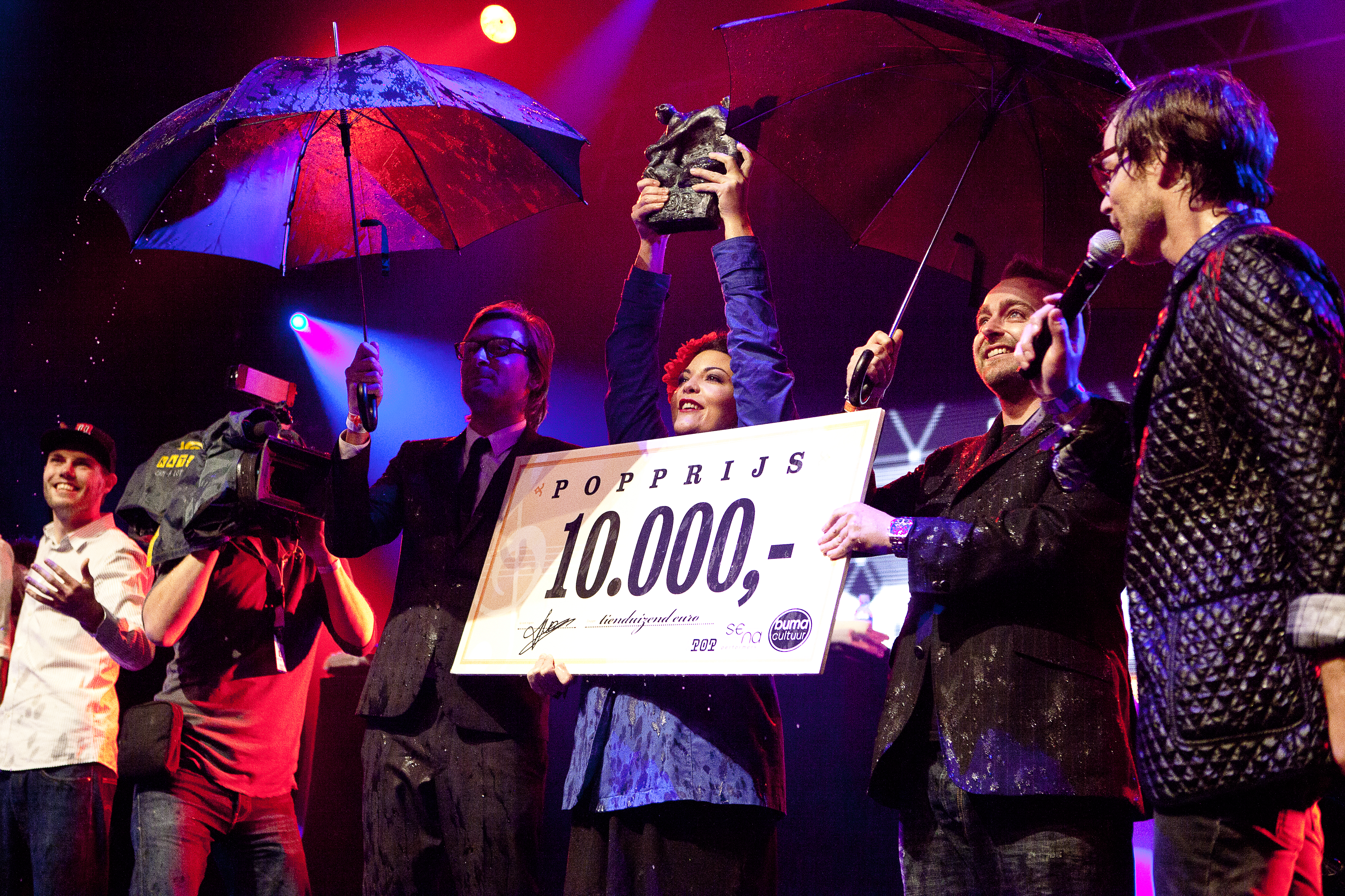
- Caro Emerald is presented with the Pop Award 2010
- Awarded for: Most important contribution to Dutch pop music
- Date: January (dates vary)
- Venue: De Oosterpoort
- Country: Netherlands
- Presented by: Buma Cultuur
- Hosted by: Giel Beelen
- Reward: 10,000 EUR
- First award: 1985
- Final award: 2016 (for 2015 achievements)

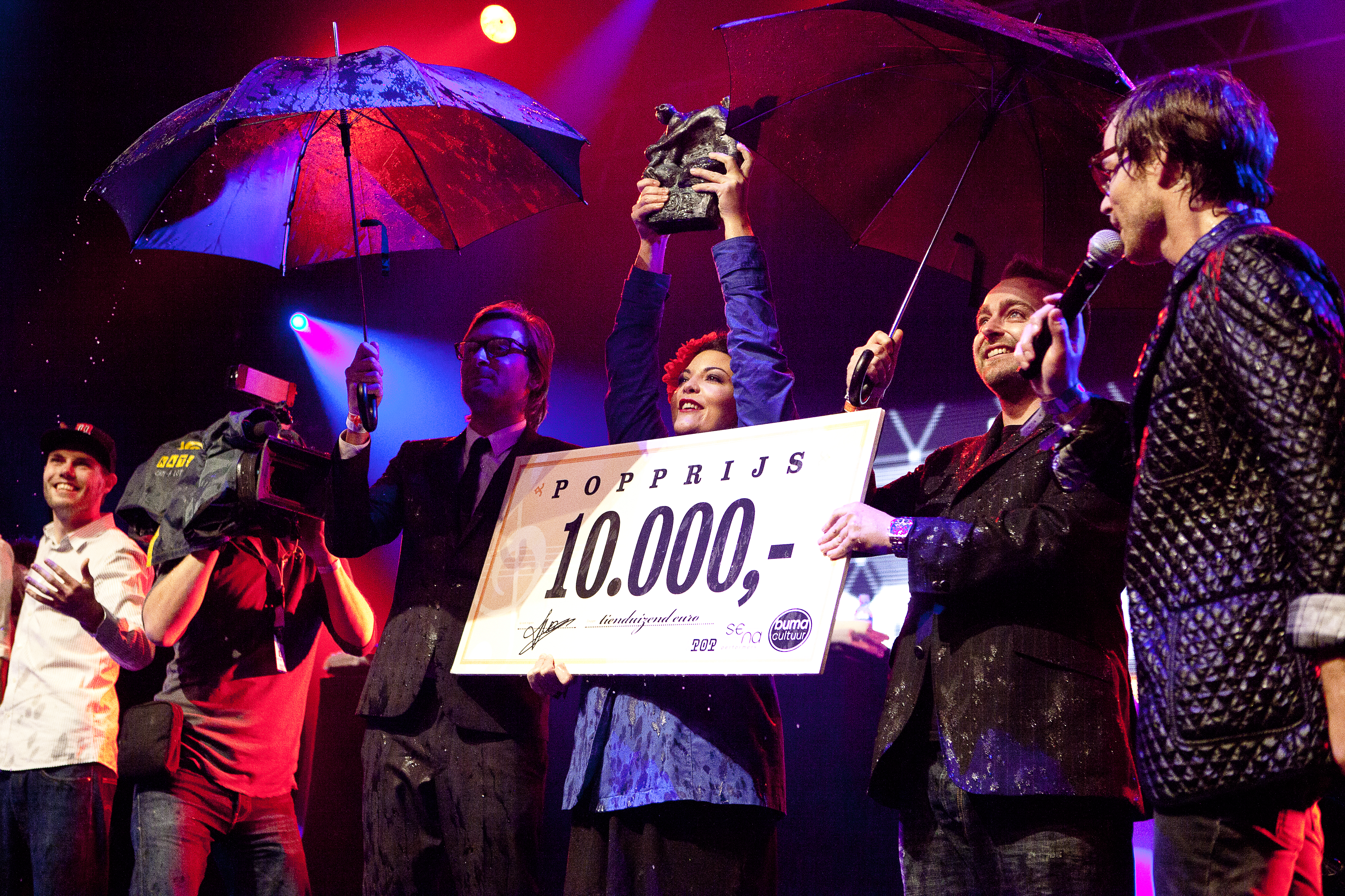
Caro Emerald is presented with the Pop Award 2010

The Buma Cultuur Pop Award (De Popprijs) is presented each January to a person or artist for making the most important contribution to Dutch pop music during the past year. The winner is appointed by a professional jury.

The Pop Award is presented by Buma Cultuur, an organization which encourages and promotes Dutch music, supported by the Dutch music rights foundation Buma/Stemra.

The first four editions of the prize were named BV Popprijs. The first edition of the award was presented to Mathilde Santing in discotheque Escape in Amsterdam on November 25, 1985 for her achievements of that year. The prize for 1986 was presented in January 1987 to Claw Boys Claw, establishing the practice to present the award in the following year. The two other awards bearing the name BV Popprijs were awarded to Herman Brood (1987) and The Nits (1988). For 1989 no award was presented. On May 20, 1991 the Urban Dance Squad receives the award for 1990, now named the Pop Award (Popprijs).

Since 1992 the award is presented during Noorderslag, which takes place on the last day of the European music conference and showcase festival Eurosonic Noorderslag in Groningen.

Since 1994 the winning artist is covered in beer thrown by the audience. Because of this, audio equipment is covered in plastic to prevent damage, the jury does not announce the winner on stage, and artists often bring umbrella's to protect themselves. Radio-DJ Giel Beelen protested against the throwing of beer on stage before presenting the prize in 2015. Days before Noorderslag 2016 the organization announced that the audience would not be allowed to bring drinks into the main hall (where the award is presented) to prevent beer throwing.

The presentation of the award is broadcast live on Dutch public television since 2008 as part of the broadcast of the Noorderslag festival.

== Winners ==
- 1985 – Mathilde Santing
- 1986 – Claw Boys Claw
- 1987 - Herman Brood
- 1988 – The Nits
- 1990 – Urban Dance Squad
- 1991 – The Ex
- 1992 – The Scene
- 1993 – Bettie Serveert
- 1994 – 2 Unlimited
- 1995 – Osdorp Posse
- 1996 – Eboman
- 1997 – Marco Borsato
- 1998 – Junkie XL
- 1999 – Postmen
- 2000 – Arling & Cameron
- 2001 – Anouk
- 2002 – Tiësto
- 2003 – BLØF
- 2004 – Ali B
- 2005 – Within Temptation
- 2006 – Spinvis
- 2007 – Armin van Buuren
- 2008 – De Dijk
- 2009 – Kyteman
- 2010 – Caro Emerald
- 2011 - De Jeugd van Tegenwoordig
- 2012 - Racoon
- 2013 - The Opposites
- 2014 - The Common Linnets
- 2015 - New Wave
- 2016 - Martin Garrix
- 2017 - Kensington
- 2018 - Ronnie Flex
- 2019 - Floor Jansen
- 2020 -
- 2021 - Di-rect
- 2022 - Goldband
- 2023 - Joost Klein
- 2024 - Roxy Dekker
