= Lights and Shadows (song) =

2017 single by OG3NE

Single by OG3NE

from the album We Got This (Special Edition)
- Released: 3 March 2017
- Genre: Pop; R&B; soul
- Length: 3:00
- Label: BMG
- Songwriters: Rick Vol; Rory de Kievit
- Producers: Rick Vol; Rory de Kievit

OG3NE singles chronology
"Loved You First" (2016)	"Lights and Shadows" (2017)	"But I Do" (2017)

Eurovision Song Contest 2017 entry
- Country: Netherlands
- Artist: OG3NE
- Language: English
- Composer: Rory de Kievit
- Lyricist: Rick Vol

Finals performance
- Semi-final result: 4th
- Semi-final points: 200
- Final result: 11th
- Final points: 150

Entry chronology
- ◄ "Slow Down" (2016)
- "Outlaw in 'Em" (2018) ►

"Lights and Shadows" is a song performed by Dutch girl group OG3NE. The song represented the Netherlands in the Eurovision Song Contest 2017. It was written by Rick Vol and Rory de Kievit. The song was released as a digital download on 3 March 2017 through BMG.

== Eurovision Song Contest ==
On 29 October 2016, it was announced that OG3NE would be representing the Netherlands in the Eurovision Song Contest 2017. In January, it was confirmed that there were three songs in the running to represent the Netherlands, and that one of them was written by Rick Vol, the father of the three members of OG3NE. It was confirmed that Vol's song had been selected on 2 February. The song title was revealed to be "Lights and Shadows" on 2 March, while the song was released the following day. The Netherlands competed in the first half of the second semi-final at the Eurovision Song Contest and finished in 11th place in the final.

== Track listing ==
Digital download
No.	Title	Length
1.	"Lights and Shadows"	3:00

== Charts ==
Chart (2017)	Peak position
Belgium (Ultratip Bubbling Under Flanders)	29
Netherlands (Dutch Top 40)	33
Netherlands (Single Top 100)	14

== Release history ==
Region	Date	Format	Label
Worldwide	3 March 2017	Digital download	BMG
