= The Common Linnets =

Dutch band

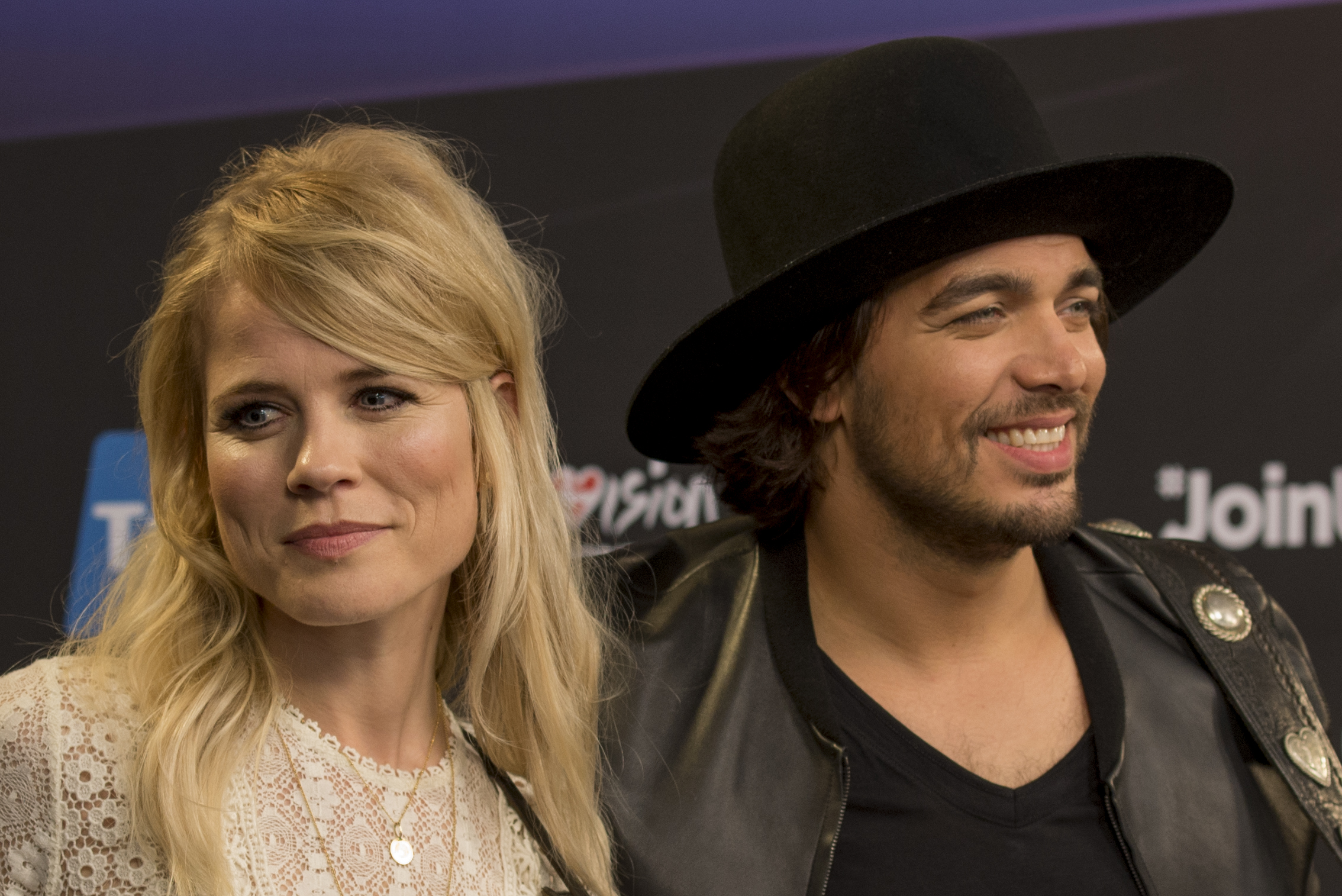
- Ilse DeLange and Waylon in 2014

Background information
- Origin: Netherlands
- Genres: Country; bluegrass; pop
- Years active: 2013–present
- Label: Firefly / Universal Music
- Members: Ilse DeLange; JB Meijers; Jake Etheridge; Matthew Crosby
- Past members: Waylon; Rob Crosby

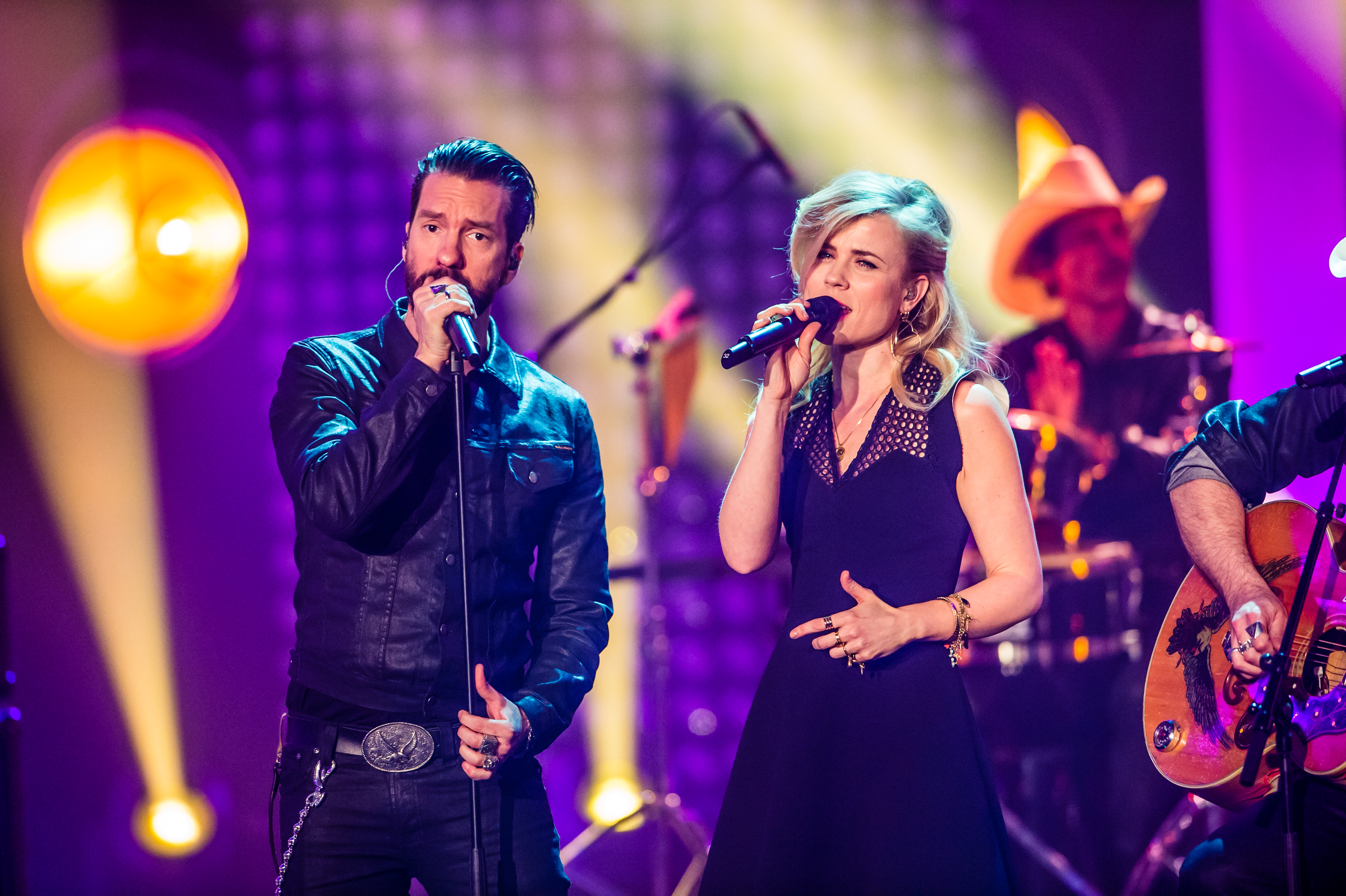
The Common Linnets in 2016

The Common Linnets are a Dutch band that was formed in 2013. The band originally consisted of Ilse DeLange and Waylon. DeLange has stated that the group is a platform for Dutch artists to make country, Americana, and bluegrass music, and that the members will be changing. In May 2014, Waylon left the group and was replaced by American country singer Jake Etheridge.

Their song "Calm After the Storm", which is on their self-titled debut album, reached second place in the final of the Eurovision Song Contest 2014 and gave the Netherlands its best result since its last winning entry in 1975.

== Name ==
Ilse de Lange and Waylon are both from the eastern part of the Netherlands. In Dutch, people from this region are sometimes called heikneuters, referring to the songbird kneu or common linnet. The name for the band is an idea from Dutch designer Rens Dekker, who is also responsible for the artwork design of their single and self-titled album.

== Members ==
The band was originally composed of individual country artists Ilse DeLange and Waylon. However, Waylon stated that the band was created by Ilse and that she is, at the moment, the main leader. Ilse said that she created the band as a project or a "platform" for Dutch artists to make country, Americana or bluegrass music. Both artists stated that both artists can "be replaced" by other musicians. Since May 2014 the band consists of Ilse DeLange, JB Meijers, Jake Etheridge, Rob Crosby and Matthew Crosby (also the writers of the hit song "Calm After The Storm").

Ilse DeLange was born on 13 May 1977 in Almelo, Netherlands. She started her career at the age of 8, and was later featured in regional and national talent shows in Hilversum. She formed a duo with guitarist Joop Liefland.

Waylon was born on 20 April 1980 in Apeldoorn, Netherlands. His stage name came from the name of his idol Waylon Jennings. After the Eurovision contest, the band went on a promotional tour in the Netherlands and some European countries. Fans however noted the absence of Waylon raising suspicion that he has left the group or even had been permanently replaced. Waylon wrote an article on his official Facebook website that "both members did not foresee the success of the band" and that he is currently occupied with his album that is going to be released in September 2014.

JB Meijers was born on 10 June 1972 in Delft, Netherlands. Before joining the Common Linnets, Meijers played guitar in Dutch indie bands Charmin' Children, Shine and Supersub. He also played with De Dijk, Eboman and Acda & De Munnik and worked as a producer. Meijers replaced Waylon as the frontman of the band alongside DeLange. Meijers wrote the song Calm After the Storm.

Jake Etheridge was born on 25 April 1988 in Columbia, South Carolina. Before joining the band, he uploaded several songs online. Dividing his time between Nashville and the Netherlands, he joined the band in 2014, following Waylon's departure.

Matthew Crosby was born in Columbia, SC in May, 1981. After graduating from the College of Charleston, he moved to New York City where he acted and formed a band, and performed regularly in lower Manhattan and other boroughs. He was invited to participate in writing songs for the first Common Linnets album, and then became a member of the band. He has released two solo EPs, and a single "Falling" as a duo with Jake Etheridge.

Rob Crosby was born in South Carolina. After moving to Nashville, many of his songs were recorded by major artists including Luke Combs, Brooks and Dunn, Lady A, Martina McBride, Dolly Parton, The Oak Ridge Boys, and many more. Touring Holland in the 90s, he met Ilse De Lange, and wrote four songs with her for her first album, "World of Hurt". They continued to write together, leading to the first songs of The Common Linnets.

== History ==
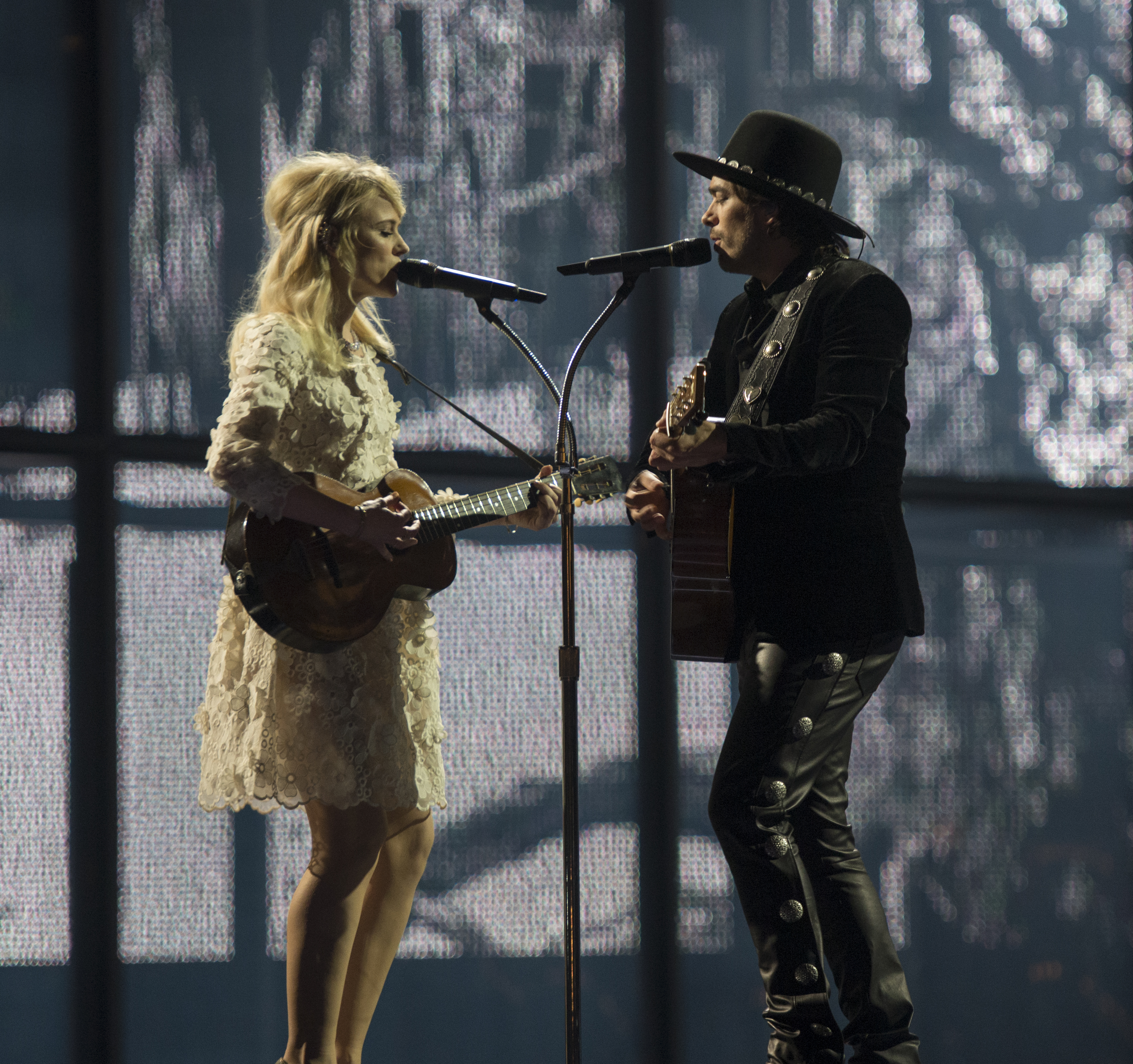
The Common Linnets performing during a dress rehearsal for the semi-finals of the Eurovision Song Contest 2014

=== 2013–14: Eurovision Song Contest and debut album ===
On 25 November 2013, the Dutch Eurovision Song Contest broadcasters, AVRO and TROS, announced in a press conference, that the band would represent the Netherlands at the Eurovision Song Contest 2014 in Copenhagen with the song "Calm After the Storm". Ilse De Lange and Waylon presented their song for Eurovision 2014 for the first time in the Dutch TV Show 'De Wereld Draait Door' on 12 March and released the final version the next day. On 9 May 2014, they released their debut studio album The Common Linnets and the following day reached second place in the Eurovision final behind Conchita Wurst of Austria. On 17 May 2014 the album entered the Dutch Albums Chart at number 1. On 14 May 2014 the album was at number 27 on The Official Chart Update in the UK. On 15 May 2014 the album entered the Irish Albums Chart at number 45. On 11 September 2014 they released "Give Me a Reason" as the second single from the album, the song peaked at number 92 on the Dutch Singles Chart. The Common Linnets won the 2014 Buma Cultuur Pop Award.

=== 2015–present: II ===
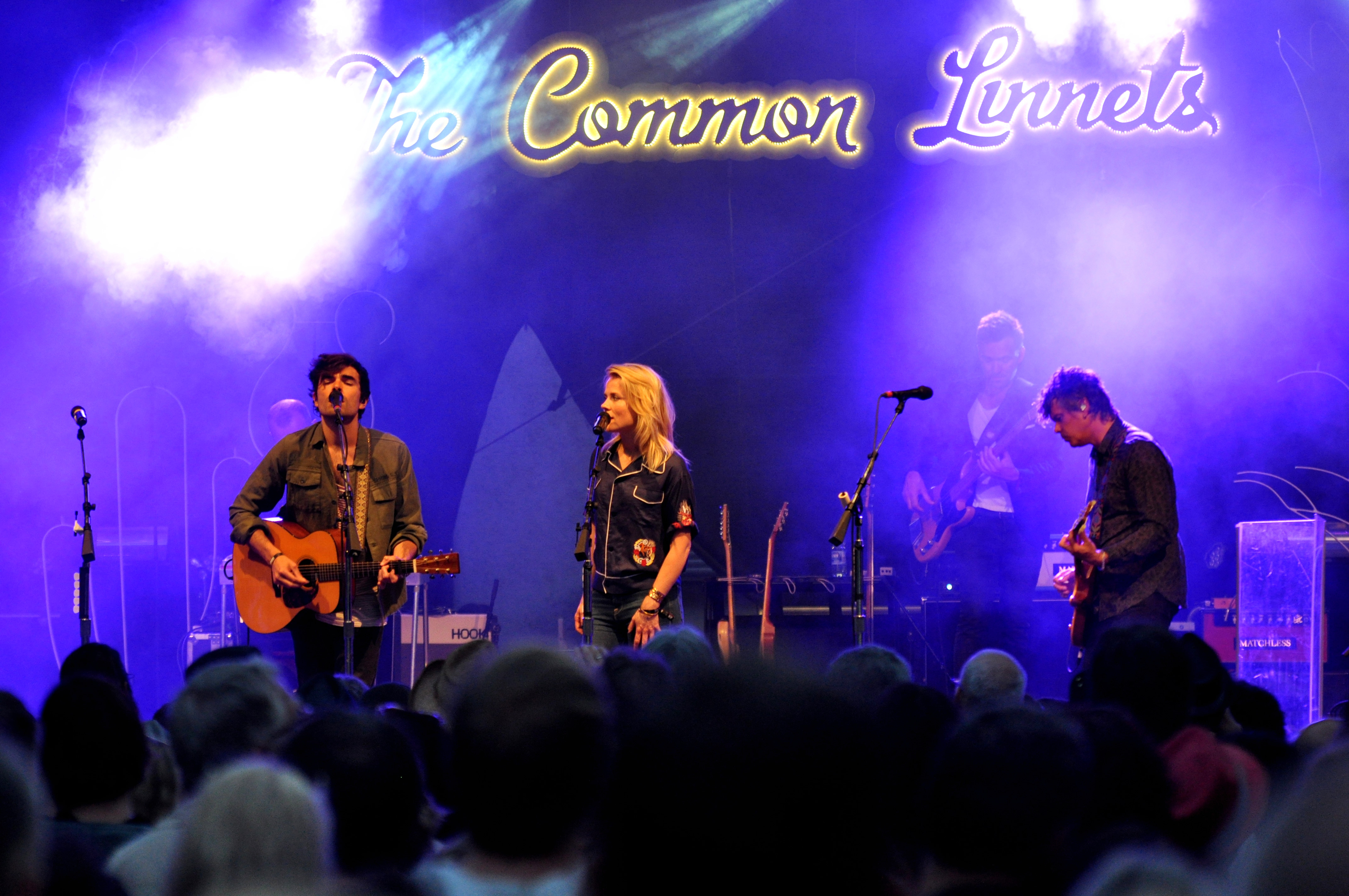
The Common Linnets at the 2017 Blacksheep Festival

The Common Linnets won the 2015 Echo Awards for Best International Newcomer Act. On 1 May 2015 they released the single "We Don't Make the Wind Blow", the song peaked at number 74 on the Dutch Singles Chart. On 25 September 2015, they released their second studio album II. The album peaked at number 1 on the Dutch Albums Chart. The album has also charted in Austria, Belgium and Germany.

== Tours ==
- October 2014: club tour through The Netherlands, Germany, in London, Vienna and Zurich
- November 2015: club tour through The Netherlands, Germany, and in Vienna
- April/May 2016: theater tour through The Netherlands and in Antwerp
- June 2016: three-date tour of the United Kingdom - acoustic gigs in London, Manchester and Bristol
- November 2016: club tour through Germany, and in Vienna

== Discography ==
=== Albums ===
| Title | Details | Peak chart positions | | | | | | | | | | Certifications |
| Title | Details | NL | AUT | BEL (Vl) | DEN | GER | IRE | SCO | SPA | SWI | UK | Certifications |
|---|---|---|---|---|---|---|---|---|---|---|---|---|
| The Common Linnets | Released: 9 May 2014; Label: Firefly/Universal Music Group; Format: Digital download | 1 | 3 | 12 | 12 | 11 | 45 | 39 | 42 | 16 | 40 | BVMI: Gold; IFPI AUT: Platinum; NVPI: 3× Platinum |
| II | Released: 25 September 2015; Label: Firefly/Universal Music Group; Format: Digital download | 1 | 32 | 40 | — | 18 | — | — | — | — | — | |
"—" denotes an album that did not chart or was not released in that territory.

=== Singles ===
==== As lead artist ====
| Title | Year | Peak chart positions | | | | | | | | | | | Certifications | Album |
| Title | Year | NL | AUS | AUT | BEL (Vl) | DEN | GER | IRE | SPA | SWE | SWI | UK | Certifications | Album |
|---|---|---|---|---|---|---|---|---|---|---|---|---|---|---|
| "Calm After the Storm" | 2014 | 1 | 66 | 2 | 1 | 2 | 3 | 4 | 5 | 36 | 3 | 9 | BVMI: 3× Gold; IFPI AUT: Gold; NVPI: Gold | The Common Linnets |
| "Give Me a Reason" | 2014 | 92 | — | — | — | — | — | — | — | — | — | — | | The Common Linnets |
| "Christmas Around Me" | 2014 | — | — | — | — | — | — | — | — | — | — | — | | The Common Linnets: Special Edition |
| "We Don't Make the Wind Blow" | 2015 | 32 | — | — | 56 | — | — | — | — | — | — | — | | II |
| "Hearts on Fire" | 2015 | — | — | — | — | — | — | — | — | — | — | — | | II |
| "In Your Eyes" | 2016 | — | — | — | — | — | — | — | — | — | — | — | | II |
"—" denotes a single that did not chart or was not released in that territory.

==== As featured artist ====
| Title | Year | Peak chart positions | | | Album |
| Title | Year | AUT | GER | SWI | Album |
|---|---|---|---|---|---|
| "Jolene" (The BossHoss featuring The Common Linnets) | 2015 | 25 | 35 | 29 | Dos Bros |

=== Other charted songs ===
| Title | Year | Peak chart positions | Album |
| Title | Year | NL | Album |
|---|---|---|---|
| "Still Loving After You" | 2014 | 16 | The Common Linnets |
| "Sun Song" | 2014 | 66 | The Common Linnets |
| "Lovers & Liars" | 2014 | 75 | The Common Linnets |
| "When Love Was King" | 2014 | 84 | The Common Linnets |
| "Where Do I Go with Me" | 2014 | 52 | The Common Linnets |
| "Time Has No Mercy" | 2014 | 86 | The Common Linnets |
| "Before Complete Surrender" | 2014 | 64 | The Common Linnets |
| "Arms of Salvation" | 2014 | 61 | The Common Linnets |
| "Hungry Hands" | 2014 | 44 | The Common Linnets |
| "Love Goes On" | 2014 | 13 | The Common Linnets |
| "Broken but Home" | 2014 | 41 | The Common Linnets |

Awards and achievements
| Preceded by Anouk with "Birds" | Netherlands in the Eurovision Song Contest; 2014 | Succeeded by Trijntje Oosterhuis with "Walk Along" |
