= Calm After the Storm =

2014 song by The Common Linnets

Single by The Common Linnets

from the album The Common Linnets
- Released: 14 March 2014
- Genre: Folk; Country folk
- Length: 3:04 (Radio edit); 3:32 (Album version)
- Label: Universal Music Group
- Songwriters: Ilse DeLange; JB Meijers; Rob Crosby; Matthew Crosby; Jake Etheridge
- Producers: Ilse DeLange; JB Meijers

The Common Linnets singles chronology
"Calm After the Storm" (2014)	"Give Me a Reason" (2014)

Music video
- "Calm After the Storm" on YouTube

Eurovision Song Contest 2014 entry
- Country: Netherlands
- Artists: Ilse DeLange; Waylon
- As: The Common Linnets
- Language: English
- Composers: Ilse DeLange; JB Meijers; Rob Crosby; Matthew Crosby; Jake Etheridge
- Lyricists: Ilse DeLange; JB Meijers; Rob Crosby; Matthew Crosby; Jake Etheridge

Finals performance
- Semi-final result: 1st
- Semi-final points: 150
- Final result: 2nd
- Final points: 238

Entry chronology
- ◄ "Birds" (2013)
- "Walk Along" (2015) ►

Song presentation
- file; help

Official performance video
- "Calm After the Storm" (Semi-1) on YouTube "Calm After the Storm" (Final) on YouTube

"Calm After the Storm" is a song by Dutch country rock duo The Common Linnets –Ilse DeLange and Waylon–, composed and written by DeLange herself, JB Meijers, Rob Crosby, Matthew Crosby, and Jake Etheridge. It represented the Netherlands at the Eurovision Song Contest 2014 held in Copenhagen, placing second with 238 points.

== Background ==
=== Conception ===
"Calm After the Storm" was composed and written by Ilse DeLange, JB Meijers, Rob Crosby, Matthew Crosby, and Jake Etheridge.

=== Selection ===
On 25 November 2013, AVROTROS announced that it had internally selected singers Ilse DeLange and Waylon, under the name The Common Linnets, as its performers for the 59th edition of the Eurovision Song Contest. On 4 March 2014, the duo revealed during NPO's talk show De Wereld Draait Door that "Calm After the Storm" would be their Eurovision entry, becoming the Dutch entrant for the contest. They first performed the song live, in an acoustic version, on 12 March 2014 on De Wereld Draait Door. The studio version was presented on 13 March 2014. The music video, shot entirely black-and-white, was filmed later in March 2014 in Edam.

=== Eurovision ===
On 6 May 2014, the first semi-final of the Eurovision Song Contest was held in B&W Hallerne in Copenhagen hosted by the Danish Broadcasting Corporation (DR) and broadcast live throughout the continent. After having taken the first place in this semi-final, the song finished in second place in the grand final on 10 May 2014, behind the winning song "Rise Like a Phoenix" by Conchita Wurst for Austria. This was the highest position for the Netherlands since it last won in the 1975 contest, and the highest score for the Netherlands in all the Eurovision contests until the 2019 edition, when Duncan Laurence claimed victory with the song "Arcade".

In addition to their high placement in the contest, the song picked up two Marcel Bezençon Awards: the Artistic Award, chosen by the commentators from the various participating broadcasters, and the Composers Award, chosen by the songwriters of all the participating songs from the 2014 contest.

== Chart performance ==
On 18 May 2014, it reached number 9 in the UK singles chart, becoming 2014's highest charting Eurovision single, and the fourth non-winning Eurovision song from outside the UK to enter the top ten, the other songs being "Nel blu dipinto di blu" (Italy 1958), "Si" (Italy 1974) and "I See a Star" (Netherlands 1974).

=== Weekly charts ===
Chart (2014)	Peak position
Australia (ARIA)	66
Austria (Ö3 Austria Top 40)	2
Belgium (Ultratop 50 Flanders)	1
Belgium (Ultratop 50 Wallonia)	20
Denmark (Tracklisten)	2
Euro Digital Songs (Billboard)	4
Finland (Suomen virallinen lista)	6
France (SNEP)	102
Germany (GfK)	3
Hungary (Single Top 40)	4
Iceland (RÚV)	1
Ireland (IRMA)	4
Luxembourg Digital Song Sales (Billboard)	9
Netherlands (Dutch Top 40)	2
Netherlands (Single Top 100)	1
Scottish Singles Sales (Official Charts)	8
Slovakia Airplay (ČNS IFPI)	25
Slovenia (SloTop50)	17
Spain (Promusicae)	5
Sweden (Sverigetopplistan)	36
Switzerland (Schweizer Hitparade)	3
Turkey (Number One Top 40)	7
UK Singles (Official Charts)	9

=== Year-end charts ===
Chart (2014)	Position
Austria (Ö3 Austria Top 40)	6
Belgium (Ultratop Flanders)	68
Germany (Official German Charts)	22
Hungary (Single Top 40)	99
Netherlands (Dutch Top 40)	60
Netherlands (Single Top 100)	17

=== Certifications ===
Region	Certification	Certified units/sales
Austria (IFPI Austria)	Gold	15,000^{*}
Germany (BVMI)	3× Gold	450,000^{‡}
Netherlands (NVPI)	Gold	10,000^{^}
^{*} Sales figures based on certification alone.^{^} Shipments figures based on certification alone.^{‡} Sales+streaming figures based on certification alone.
