= List of Armenian films of the 2000s =

This is a list of films released in the 2000s produced in Armenia or directed by Armenians or about Armenia or Armenians, ordered by year of release.

Title	Director	Cast	Genre	Notes
2000
The day of darkness	Vahe Khachatryan	Gor Vardanyan; Artavazd Harutyunyan; Shavarsh Poghosyan; Abel Abelyan; Luisa Ghabaryan	trailer	Last Armenian film to be released on VHS.
Banda	Vahe Khachatryan	Hayk Marutyan; Mkrtich Arzumanyan; Hayk Khachatryan; Aramo; Mark Saghatelyan	comedy	
2001
Merry Bus	Albert Mkrtchyan	Anahit Kocharyan; Georgi Baghdasaryan; Susanna Baghdasaryan; Azat Gasparyan; Sos Sargsyan	melodrama	
Symphony of Silence	Vigen Chaldranyan			It was Armenia's submission to the 74th Academy Awards for the Academy Award for Best Foreign Language Film, but was not accepted as a nominee.
2002
Election	Gor Vardanyan; Mikayel Dovlatyan	Gor Vardanyan; Rudolf Ghevondyan; Levon Harutyunyan; Rafayel Kotanjyan; Levon Sharafyan	crime action	
Ararat	Atom Egoyan	Charles Aznavour; Christopher Plummer; David Alpay; Arsinée Khanjian; Eric Bogosian	drama historical	It is based loosely on the defense of Van in 1915 during the Armenian genocide, an event that is disputed to this day by the Government of Turkey. The film was screened out of competition at the 2002 Cannes Film Festival.
2003
Vodka Lemon	Hiner Saleem	Romen Avinian; Lala Sarkissian; Ivan Franek	comedy-drama	
Unwritten Law	Vahe Khachatryan	Gor Vardanyan; Artyom Markosyan; Levon Ghazaryan; Aramo	crime action	
2004
My Son Shall Be Armenian	Hagop Goudsouzian		documentary	
2005
Udar Lotosa 4: Almaz	Alexandr Klimenko	Jamal Azhigirey; Gor Vardanyan; Ezhen Kushvakha; Yuriy Nazarov; Aleksei Petrenko	crime action	
2006
Screamers	Carla Garapedian	Serj Tankian; Daron Malakian; Shavo Odadjian; John Dolmayan	documentary	
Our Yard 3	Hrant Movsisyan	Hrant Tokhatyan; Ashot Ghazaryan; Lala Mnatsakanyan	musical comedy	
Big Story in a Small City	Gor Kirakosian	Hrant Tokhatyan; Khoren Levonyan; Mayranush Grigoryan	comedy	
2007
The Priestess	Vigen Chaldranyan	Rouzan Vit Mesropyan; Vigen Chaldranyan; Karen Janibekyan; Armen Elbakyan	historical drama	
A Story of People in War and Peace	Vardan Hovhannisyan		documentary	
Destiny	Vahe Khachatryan	Gor Vardanyan; Armen Mazmanyan	war action	
Do Not Be Afraid	Aram Shahbazyan	Khoren Levonyan; Lusine Tovmasyan; Artashes Aleksanyan	war drama	
Stone, Time, Touch	Gariné Torossian	Kamee Abrahamian; Arsinée Khanjian	documentary	"Best Creative Documentary" at the Warsaw Film Festival (2007)
2008
The Dawn of the Sad Street	Albert Mkrtchyan	Anahit Kocharyan; Guzh Manukyan	war drama	
2009
The Last Tightrope Dancer in Armenia	Inna Sahakyan; Arman Yeritsyan		documentary	
Bonded Parallels	Hovhannes Galstyan	Siri Helene Müller; Laurence Ritter; Sos Janibekyan; Serge Avedikian	drama, history	
The Killed Dove	Hrachya Keshishyan	Khoren Levonyan; Nazeni Hovhannisyan; Karen Janibekyan; Artur Karapetyan	drama	
Maestro	Vigen Chaldranyan	Michael Poghosyan; Eka Horstka; Karen Janibekyan; Avet Barseghyan	political drama	
Taxi Eli Lav A	Artak Zilfimyan; Garik Mashkaryan; Hrachya Keshishyan; Aram Ghazaryan; Aram Shahbazyan; Avag Avagyan; David Babayan; Hrant Movsisyan; Edgar Baghdasaryan; Vahe Khachatryan	Levon Harutyunyan; Hrant Tokhatyan; Khoren Levonyan; Luiza Nersisyan; Michael Poghosyan; Nazeni Hovhannisyan; Lili Elbakyan	comedy	Shot by 10 directors
