= List of Armenian films of the 1990s =

This is a list of films released in the 1990s produced in Armenia or directed by Armenians or about Armenia or Armenians, ordered by year of release.

Title	Director	Cast	Genre	Notes
1990
Yearning	Frunze Dovlatyan	Rafael Atoyan; Galya Novents	drama	Based on Hrachya Kochar's novel Nostalgia
1991
Mayrig	Henri Verneuil	Richard Berry; Claudia Cardinale; Omar Sharif; Isabelle Sadoyan; Nathalie Roussel; Jacques Villeret; Zabou Breitman	semi-autobiographical	
The Voice in the Wilderness	Vigen Chaldranyan	Vigen Chaldranyan	drama	It was entered into the 18th Moscow International Film Festival
1992
Փարաջանով: Վերջին Գարուն; Параджанов последняя весна The Last Spring	Mikhail Vartanov	Sergei Parajanov; Sofiko Chiaureli; Mikhail Vartanov; Aleksandr Kaidanovsky; Silva Kaputikyan; Bella Akhmadulina	documentary	Golden Palm Award at Beverly Hills Film Festival (2003); Best Documentary Film at Nika Awards (1993); Golden Gate Award at San Francisco International Film Festival (1995)
1993
Օրացույց; Calendar	Atom Egoyan	Arsinée Khanjian; Ashot Adamyan; Atom Egoyan	comedy, drama	
1994
1995
The Thief	Ruben Gevorgyants; Georgi Kevorkov	Ashot Ghazaryan; Anna Elbakyan		
1996
Our Yard	Mikayel Dovlatyan	Hrant Tokhatyan; Ashot Ghazaryan; Lala Mnatsakanyan; Armen Khostikyan; Aram Asatryan	musical comedy	
1997
1998
Our Yard 2	Mikayel Dovlatyan	Hrant Tokhatyan; Ashot Ghazaryan; Lala Mnatsakanyan; Armen Khostikyan	musical comedy	
Yerevan Blues	Vahe Khachatryan	Michael Poghosyan; Angelina Babajanyan; Ruben Hakhverdyan; Aram Gevorgyan; Levon Malkhasyan; Krist Manaryan; Levon Sharafyan	comedy	
1999

== See also ==
- List of Soviet films
