= List of Armenian actors =

This is a list of actors of full or partly Armenian origin.

(sorted alphabetically by surname)

- Simon Abkarian
- Marie Rose Abousefian
- Aleksandr Adabashyan
- Petros Adamian
- Nina Agadzhanova
- Güllü Agop
- David Alpay
- Nora Armani
- Kay Armen
- Grégoire Aslan
- Serge Avedikian
- Val Avery
- Hovhannes Babakhanyan
- Richard Bakalyan
- Aracy Balabanian
- Roman Balayan
- Nikita Balieff
- Adrienne Barbeau
- François Berléand
- Pooja Bhatt
- Eric Bogosian
- Arthur Edmund Carewe
- Rosa Gloria Chagoyán
- Cher
- Gregg Chillin
- Mike Connors
- Ken Davitian
- Hugues de Bagratide
- Mariana Derderian
- Armen Dzhigarkhanyan
- Naz Edwards
- Arlene Francis
- Vilen Galstyan
- Charles Gérard
- Davit Gharibyan
- Michael A. Goorjian
- Sid Haig
- David Hedison
- Tulip Joshi
- Karp Khachvankyan
- Tamara Khanum
- Dmitry Kharatyan
- Paolo Kessisoglu
- Lebleba
- Vivien Leigh
- Pavel Luspekayev
- Yervand Manaryan
- Armen Margaryan
- Andrea Martin
- Amasi Martirosyan
- Max Maxudian
- Mher Mkrtchyan
- Vladimir Msryan
- Rodion Nakhapetov
- Stepan Nercessian
- Galya Novents
- Erik Palladino
- Vardan Petrosyan
- Michael Poghosyan
- Osvaldo Ríos
- Vahram Sahakian
- Angela Sarafyan
- Alice Sapritch
- Andy Serkis
- Adam G. Sevani
- Ruben Simonov
- Vic Tablian
- Akim Tamiroff
- Jano Toussounian
- Vagharsh Vagharshian
- Michael Vartan
- Rosy Varte
- Dita Von Teese
- Leonid Yengibarov

== See also ==
- Lists of actors
- List of Armenians
