= List of Armenian submissions for the Academy Award for Best International Feature Film =

Best International Feature Film submissions from Armenia

Highlights
- Debut: 2001
- Submissions: 16
- Nominations: none
- Oscar winners: none

Armenia has submitted films for the Academy Award for Best International Feature Film (Note: The category was previously named the Academy Award for Best Foreign Language Film, but this was changed to the Academy Award for Best International Feature Film in April 2019, after the Academy deemed the word "Foreign" to be outdated.) since 2002. The award is handed out annually by the United States Academy of Motion Picture Arts and Sciences to a feature-length motion picture produced outside the United States that contains primarily non-English dialogue. It was not created until the 1956 Academy Awards, in which a competitive Academy Award of Merit, known as the Best Foreign Language Film Award, was created for non-English speaking films, and has been given annually since. They also unsuccessfully attempted to submit a film in 1991.

As of 2026, Armenia has submitted sixteen films, but none of them were nominated.

== Submissions ==
The Academy of Motion Picture Arts and Sciences has invited the film industries of various countries to submit their best film for the Academy Award for Best International Feature Film since 1956. The Best International Feature Film Committee oversees the process and reviews all the submitted films. Following this, they vote via secret ballot to determine the five nominees for the award.

The Voice in the Wilderness (1991), directed by Vigen Chaldranyan, and Earthquake (2016), directed by Sarik Andreasyan, were both disqualified.

Amerikatsi (2023) directed by Michael A. Goorjian advanced to the December shortlists, but was not nominated.

Most of the films are primary in Armenian, with the exception of Should the Wind Drop (2021), which was mainly in French. Below is a list of the films that have been submitted by Armenia for review by the academy for the award by year and the respective Academy Awards ceremony.

Year (Ceremony)	Film title used in nomination	Original title	Language(s)	Director(s)	Result
1991 (64th)	The Voice in the Wilderness	Ձայն բարբառոյ...	Armenian	Vigen Chaldranyan	Disqualified
2001 (74th)	Symphony of Silence	Լռության Սիմֆոնիա	Armenian	Vigen Chaldranyan	Not nominated
2003 (76th)	Vodka Lemon	Վոդկա լիմոն	Armenian, Kurmanji, Kurdish, Russian, French	Hiner Saleem	Not nominated
2009 (82nd)	Autumn of the Magician	Հրաշագործի աշունը	Armenian, English, Italian	Ruben Gevorkyants, Vahe Gevorkyants	Not nominated
2012 (85th)	If Only Everyone	Եթե բոլորը	Armenian, Russian	Nataliya Belyauskene	Not nominated
2016 (89th)	Earthquake	Երկրաշարժ / Землетрясение	Armenian, Russian	Sarik Andreasyan	Disqualified
2017 (90th)	Yeva	Եվա	Armenian	Anahit Abad	Not nominated
2018 (91st)	Spitak	Սպիտակ	Armenian, Russian, French	Alexander Kott	Not nominated
2019 (92nd)	Lengthy Night	Էրկեն Կիշեր	Armenian	Edgar Baghdasaryan	Not nominated
2020 (93rd)	Songs of Solomon	Սողոմոնի երգերը	Armenian	Arman Nshanian	Not nominated
2021 (94th)	Should the Wind Drop	Si le vent tombe, Երբ որ քամին հանդարտվի	French, Armenian, English, Russian	Nora Martirosyan	Not nominated
2022 (95th)	Aurora's Sunrise	Արշալույսի լուսաբացը	Armenian, English, Turkish	Inna Sahakyan	Not nominated
2023 (96th)	Amerikatsi	Ամերիկական	Armenian, English, Russian	Michael A. Goorjian	Made shortlist
2024 (97th)	Yasha and Leonid Brezhnev	Յաշան և Լեոնիդ Բրեժնևը	Armenian, Russian	Edgar Baghdasaryan	Not nominated
2025 (98th)	My Armenian Phantoms	Իմ հայկական ուրվականները	Armenian, Russian	Tamara Stepanyan	Not nominated
2026 (99th)	In the Land of Arto	Le Pays d'Arto	French, Armenian, English	Tamara Stepanyan	Pending

== See also ==
- List of Academy Award winners and nominees for Best International Feature Film
- List of Academy Award-winning foreign language films
- Cinema of Armenia
