= List of submissions to the 74th Academy Awards for Best Foreign Language Film =

2001 Best Foreign Language Film submissions
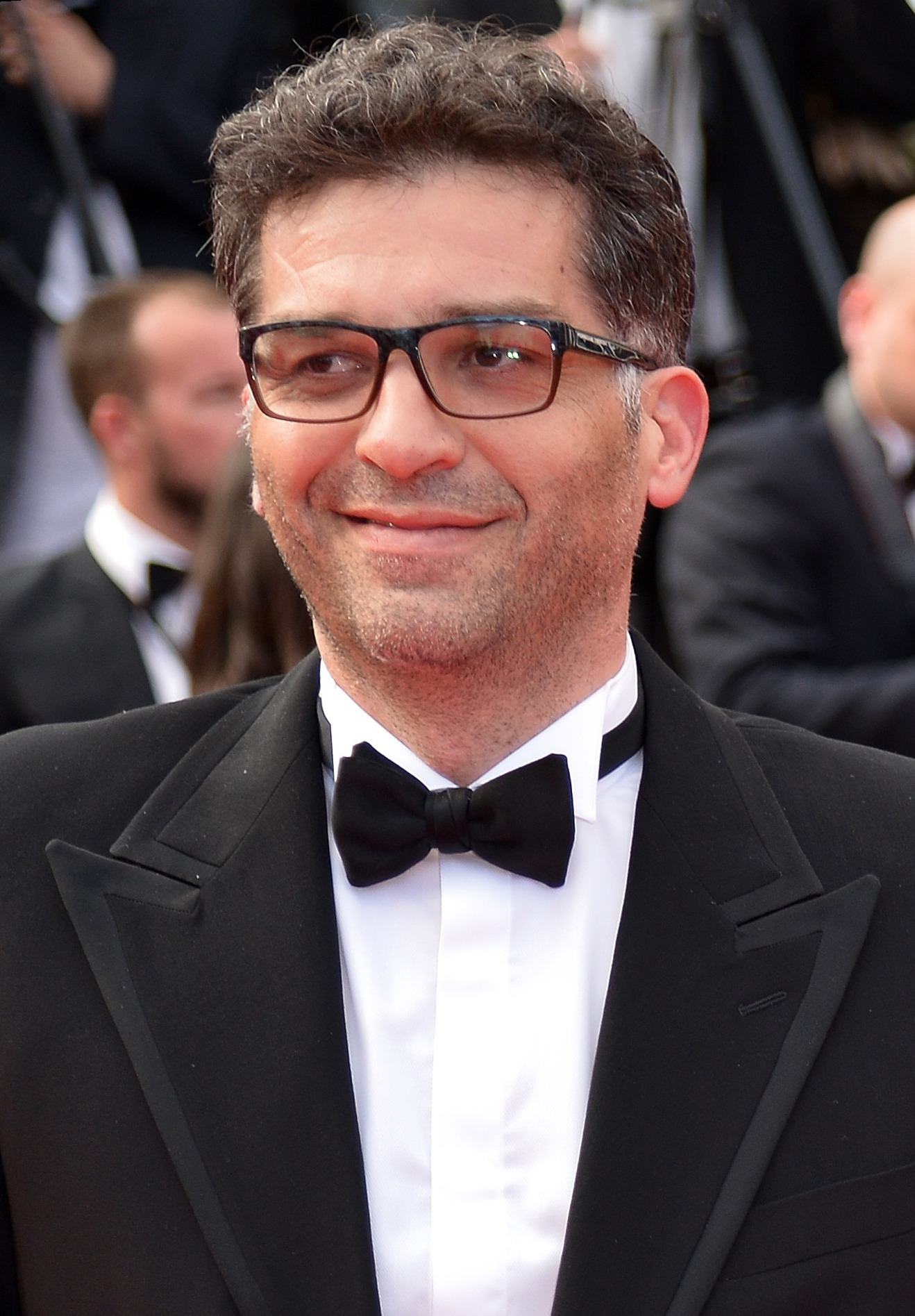
- Danis Tanović directed No Man's Land, which won the year's award.

Highlights
- Oscar winner: (Bosnia and Herzegovina) No Man's Land
- Submissions: 51
- Debuts: 2

This is a list of submissions to the 74th Academy Awards for the Best Foreign Language Film. The Academy of Motion Picture Arts and Sciences (AMPAS) has invited the film industries of various countries to submit their best film for the Academy Award for Best Foreign Language Film every year since the award was created in 1956. The award is presented annually by the Academy to a feature-length motion picture produced outside the United States that contains primarily non-English dialogue. The Foreign Language Film Award Committee oversees the process and reviews all the submitted films.

For the 74th Academy Awards, the submitted motion pictures must have first been released theatrically in their respective countries between 1 November 2000 and 31 October 2001. The deadline for submissions to the Academy was 1 November 2001. 51 countries submitted films and were found to be eligible by AMPAS and screened for voters. Armenia and Tanzania submitted films for the first time. The five nominees were announced on 12 February 2002.

Bosnia and Herzegovina won the award for the first time with No Man's Land by Danis Tanović.

== Submissions ==
Submitting country	Film title used in nomination	Original title	Language(s)	Director(s)	Result
Albania	Slogans	Parullat	Albanian	Gjergj Xhuvani	Not nominated
Algeria	Inch'Allah Dimanche	إن شاء الله الأحد	Arabic, French, Kabyle	Yamina Benguigui	Not nominated
Argentina	Son of the Bride	El hijo de la novia	Spanish	Juan José Campanella	Nominated
Armenia	Symphony of Silence	Լռության Սիմֆոնիա	Armenian	Vigen Chaldranyan	Not nominated
Australia	La spagnola		Spanish, English, Italian	Steve Jacobs	Not nominated
Austria	The Piano Teacher	La pianiste	French, German	Michael Haneke	Not nominated
Belgium	Pauline and Paulette	Pauline & Paulette	Dutch, Flemish, French	Lieven Debrauwer	Not nominated
Bosnia and Herzegovina	No Man's Land	Ničija zemlja	Bosnian, Serbian, English, French, German	Danis Tanović	Won Academy Award
Brazil	Behind the Sun	Abril Despedaçado	Brazilian Portuguese	Walter Salles	Not nominated
Bulgaria	Fate as a Rat	Съдбата като плъх	Bulgarian	Ivan Pavlov	Not nominated
Canada	Atanarjuat: The Fast Runner	ᐊᑕᓈᕐᔪᐊᑦ	Inuktitut	Zacharias Kunuk	Not nominated
Chile	A Cab for Three	Taxi para tres	Spanish	Orlando Lübbert	Not nominated
Colombia	Our Lady of the Assassins	La virgen de los sicarios	Spanish	Barbet Schroeder	Not nominated
Croatia	Queen of the Night	Kraljica noći	Croatian	Branko Schmidt	Not nominated
Czech Republic	Dark Blue World	Tmavomodrý svět	Czech, English, German, Slovak, Spanish	Jan Svěrák	Not nominated
Denmark	Italian for Beginners	Italiensk for begyndere	Danish, Italian, English	Lone Scherfig	Not nominated
Estonia	The Heart of the Bear	Karu süda	Estonian, Russian, Evenki	Arvo Iho	Not nominated
Finland	The River	Joki	Finnish	Jarmo Lampela	Not nominated
France	Amélie	Le fabuleux destin d'Amélie Poulain	French	Jean-Pierre Jeunet	Nominated
Georgia	The Migration of the Angel	ანგელოზის გადაფრენა	Georgian	Nodar Managadze	Not nominated
Germany	The Experiment	Das Experiment	German	Oliver Hirschbiegel	Not nominated
Greece	In Good Company	Ένας κι Ένας	Greek	Nikos Zapatinas	Not nominated
Hong Kong	Fulltime Killer	全職殺手	Cantonese, Mandarin, Japanese, English, Portuguese	Wai Ka-fai and Johnnie To	Not nominated
Hungary	Abandoned	Torzók	Hungarian	Árpád Sopsits	Not nominated
Iceland	The Seagull's Laughter	Mávahlátur	Icelandic, Danish	Ágúst Guðmundsson	Not nominated
India	Lagaan	लगान	Hindi, Bhojpuri, English, Awadhi, Braj	Ashutosh Gowariker	Nominated
Iran	Baran	باران	Persian, Dari, Azerbaijani, Central Kurdish, Turkmen, Luri	Majid Majidi	Not nominated
Israel	Late Marriage	חתונה מאוחרת	Judaeo-Georgian, Hebrew, Georgian	Dover Kosahvili	Not nominated
Italy	The Son's Room	La stanza del figlio	Italian	Nanni Moretti	Not nominated
Japan	Go		Japanese, Korean, Spanish	Isao Yukisada	Not nominated
Kyrgyzstan	The Chimp	Маймыл	Kyrgyz, Russian	Aktan Arym Kubat	Not nominated
Mexico	Violet Perfume: No One Is Listening	Perfume de violetas, nadie te oye	Spanish	Maryse Sistach	Not nominated
Netherlands	The Moving True Story of a Woman Ahead of Her Time	Nynke	West Frisian, Dutch	Pieter Verhoeff	Not nominated
Norway	Elling		Norwegian	Petter Næss	Nominated
Philippines	In the Bosom of the Enemy	Gatas... Sa Dibdib ng Kaaway	Filipino, English, Japanese	Gil Portes	Not nominated
Poland	Quo Vadis		Polish, Latin, Ancient Greek	Jerzy Kawalerowicz	Not nominated
Portugal	Camarate		Portuguese	Luis Filipe Rocha	Not nominated
Puerto Rico	12 Hours	12 horas	Spanish	Raúl Marchand Sánchez	Not nominated
Russia	The Romanovs: An Imperial Family	Романовы - Венценосная семья	Russian	Gleb Panfilov	Not nominated
Slovenia	Bread and Milk	Kruh in mleko	Slovene	Jan Cvitkovič	Not nominated
Spain	Mad Love	Juana la Loca	Spanish	Vicente Aranda	Not nominated
Sweden	Jalla! Jalla!		Swedish, Arabic	Josef Fares	Not nominated
Switzerland	In Praise of Love	Éloge de l'amour	French, English	Jean-Luc Godard	Not nominated
Taiwan	The Cabbie	運轉手之戀	Mandarin, Taiwanese Hokkien	Chang Hwa-kun and Chen Yi-wen	Not nominated
Tanzania	Maangamizi: The Ancient One		Swahili, English	Martin Mhando and Ron Mulvihill	Not nominated
Thailand	The Moonhunter	14 ตุลา สงครามประชาชน	Thai	Bhandit Rittakol	Not nominated
Turkey	Big Man, Little Love	Büyük Adam Küçük Aşk / Hêjar	Turkish, Northern Kurdish	Handan İpekçi	Not nominated
United Kingdom	Do Not Go Gentle	Oed yr Addewid	Welsh, English	Emlyn Williams	Not nominated
Uruguay	In This Tricky Life	En la puta vida	Spanish	Beatriz Flores Silva	Not nominated
Venezuela	A House with a View of the Sea	Una casa con vista al mar	Spanish	Alberto Arvelo	Not nominated
FR Yugoslavia	War Live	Рат уживо	Serbian	Darko Bajić	Not nominated

== Notes ==
- Uruguay submitted In This Tricky Life by Beatriz Flores Silva. Because of the controversy surrounding the disqualification of A Place in the World by Adolfo Aristarain in 1992, the Academy announced that In This Tricky Life and Uruguay submitted a film "for the first time", thereby omitting any mention of A Place in the World.
