= Smerch =

Smerch (Russian word for whirlwind) might refer to:

- BM-30 Smerch, a modern multiple rocket launcher system
- Smerch (radar), fighter radar on the Mikoyan-Gurevich MiG-25
- Whirlwind (1988 film), 1988 action film produced in the Soviet Union
- Russian monitor Smerch, launched 1863

Smerch may also refer to:

- a portmanteau nickname given to the British actor Stephen Merchant
