= Lengthy Night =

2018 Armenian drama film

- Film poster
- Directed by: Edgar Baghdasaryan
- Starring: Shant Hovhannisyan
- Release date: 8 December 2018
- Running time: 100 minutes
- Country: Armenia
- Language: Armenian

Lengthy Night (Armenian: Էրկեն կիշեր, romanized: Erken kisher) is a 2018 Armenian drama film directed by Edgar Baghdasaryan. It was selected as the Armenian entry for the Best International Feature Film at the 92nd Academy Awards, but it was not nominated.

== Plot ==
An unusual stone ties together three stories set in the early 2000s, the Armenian genocide of 1915 and the 11th century.

== Cast ==
- Shant Hovhannisyan
- Samvel Grigoryan
- Luiza Nersisyan
- Babken Chobanyan

== See also ==
- List of submissions to the 92nd Academy Awards for Best International Feature Film
- List of Armenian submissions for the Academy Award for Best International Feature Film
