= A House with a View of the Sea =

2001 film directed by Alberto Arvelo

- Spanish Film Poster
- Directed by: Alberto Arvelo Mendoza
- Written by: Alberto Arvelo Mendoza
- Release dates: August 28, 2001 (MWFF); January 17, 2003 (Spain)
- Running time: 93 minutes
- Countries: Venezuela; Canada; Spain
- Language: Spanish

A House with a View of the Sea (Spanish: Una casa con vista al mar) is a 2001 drama film written and directed by Alberto Arvelo, and a Spain-Canada co-production with Venezuela. It was Venezuela's submission to the 74th Academy Awards for the Academy Award for Best Foreign Language Film, but was not accepted as a nominee. It was first released in Europe in 2003, before its Venezuelan premiere a year later.

It stars Imanol Arias, Gabriel Arcand, and Leandro Arvelo.

ABC describes the film as an "intimate and crude history about the Venezuelan peasants of 1948".

== Synopsis ==
Based on the novel Vincentino Guerrero by Freddy Sosa, it tells the story of a farming family in 1948 Los Andes headed by Tomás Alonso that is broken when his wife dies, leaving him to take care of his son alone. To console him, Tomás gives his son a photograph of his mother by the sea, with the boy developing a fascination for the sea. Tomás struggles with wanting his son to love the farmland and protecting the boy from their richer neighbors.

== Cast ==
- Imanol Arias
- Gabriel Arcand
- Leandro Arvelo
- Alejo Felipe
- Héctor Manrique
- Manuela Aguirre
- Marcel Jaworski
- Nerio Zerpa
- Bernardino Angel
- Ramona Pérez

== Awards ==
Year	Event	Category	Result	Ref
2001	Havana Film Festival	Glauber Rocha Award	Won	
2001	Havana Film Festival	FIPRESCI Award	Won	
2001	Festival de Cine Iberoamericano de Huelva	Audience Award	Won	
2002	Biarritz Film Festival	Audience Award	Won	
2002	Fribourg International Film Festival	Audience Award	Won	
2002	Cartagena Film Festival	OCIC Award	Won	
2002	Cinemanila International Film Festival	Special Jury Prize	Won	
2002	Miami International Film Festival	Golden Egret Award	Won	
2002	Oslo Film Festival	Best Latin Film	Won	
2003	LaCinemaFe	Silver Apple Award for Best Film	Won	

== See also ==
- List of submissions to the 74th Academy Awards for Best Foreign Language Film
