= Oh, Gevorg =

Soviet film

- Օ՜,Գևորգ
- Directed by: Sargis Petrosyan
- Screenplay by: Eduard Akopov, Leonid Yankov
- Starring: Frunzik Mkrtchyan
- Music by: Yuri Harutyunyan
- Production companies: Hayfilm, Mosfilm
- Release date: 3 May 1980
- Running time: 10 minutes
- Country: Soviet Union
- Languages: Armenian, Russian

Oh, Gevorg (Armenian: Օ՜,Գևորգ) is a 1979 Soviet comedy short film directed by Sargis Petrosyan, produced by Hayflim jointly with Mosfilm. The film is about a womanizer who gets entangled in a complicated love affair.

== Cast ==
- Frunzik Mkrtchyan
- Zhenya Avetisyan
- Evelina Shahiryan
- Marie Rose Abousefian
- Martin Avetisyan
- Henrik Alaverdyan
