= Michael Poghosyan =

Armenian film and theatre actor (born 1954)

Michael Poghosyan Միքայել Պողոսյան
- Born: 31 May 1954 (age 72); Yerevan, Armenian SSR, Soviet Union
- Occupations: Actor, TV personality
- Years active: 1976–present

Michael Movsesi Poghosyan (sometimes credited as Mikael Pogosyan, Michael Poghosian, Mikael Poghosyan, Armenian: Միքայել Պողոսյան; born 31 May 1954) is an Armenian film and theatre actor, as well as a judge on the Armenian version of Pop Idol.

== Professional practice ==
In 1978, he graduated from the Acting Department of Yerevan Fine Arts and Theatre Institute. He worked in the Yerevan Chamber Theatre from 1976 to 91 and in the Hamazgayin Yerevan Drama Theatre from 1992 to 94. Poghosyan was actor of Armenfilm Studio between 1978 and 1992.

== Awards ==
- Best Modern Contemporary Album, Armenian Music Awards, (2004)

== Selected filmography ==
- Earthquake (2016)
- Lost & Found in Armenia (2012) as Grandpa Matsak
- If Only Everyone (2012) as Gurgen
- Symphony of Silence (2001) as Kondi Gzho
- The Merry Bus (2001) as Uncle Khoren
- Yerevan Blues (1998) as Hapetik/Policeman/Sparapet/Indian Ambassador/Theatre Fireman
- Khatabalada (1997) as Hamazasp
- Yerevan Jan (1999)
- The Voice in the Wilderness (1991) as Tomazo
- Deadline in Seven Days (1991) as Mikael Poghosyan
- Wind of Oblivion (1990) as Mikael Poghosyan
- Taynyy sovetnik (1989) as Mikael Poghosyan
- Three of Us (1988)
- The Last Sunday (1986) as Armen
- Snowdrops and Edelweiss (1982) as Zhikharev
