= Bonded Parallels =

2009 film by Hovhannes Galstyan

- Directed by: Hovhannes Galstyan
- Written by: Hovhannes Galstyan
- Produced by: Gevorg Gevorgyan; Jean-Marie Delbary; Hovhannes Galstyan; Marie-Anne Le Metayer-Djivelekian; Olivier Oursel; Trond Brede Andersen
- Starring: Siri Helene Müller; Laurence Ritter; Sos Janibekyan; Serge Avedikian
- Cinematography: Rouben Gasparyan
- Music by: Vahagn Hayrapetyan
- Production company: Parallels Film Production
- Release dates: 23 June 2009 (MIFF); 15 July 2009 (Armenia)
- Running time: 91 minutes
- Country: Armenia
- Language: Armenian

Bonded Parallels (Armenian: Խճճված զուգահեռներ) is a 2009 film written and directed by Armenian filmmaker Hovhannes Galstyan. This film deals with two stories which take place at different times and linked by the birth of the protagonist, the daughter, and the death of the second main character, the mother. The destiny of these two heroines has been influenced by the true story of an Armenian soldier during World War II in Norway and by director's personal history.

In 2009 and 2010, the film was shown at international film festivals in Moscow, Yerevan, Toronto, Orenburg, Volokolamsk, Rotterdam, Houston, Cannes, Los Angeles, and São Paulo. It also appeared at Best of CIS Countries festivals in Russia, Ukraine, Armenia, Kazakhstan, Austria, and the Czech Republic.

== Plot ==
Norway, World War II. Hanna, whose husband Henrik participates in the resistance movement, gives temporary asylum to a prisoner of war, Arakel, by hiding him in her house in northern Norway. The presence of this stranger changes Hanna's life, and she starts writing about her mixed feelings in her diary.

Soviet Union, Armenia, 1988. Laura, 42, a single and fiercely independent math teacher, lives a quiet and isolated life in Yerevan. It seems that nothing can change her rigidly ordered daily routine until she receives the diary of her mother, who died while giving birth to her. As Laura learns about her parents' story for the first time - a love story of desperation, loss and primal passion - she begins to experience a parallel story of forbidden love in her own life.

== Cast ==
- Siri Helene Müller as Hanga
- Laurence Ritter as Laura
- Sos Janibekyan as Narek
- Serge Avedikian as Arakel

== Production ==
The project was developed by the AVANTI Training program for South Caucasus Filmmakers between 2003 and 2004, implemented by FOCAL and funded by the SDC-Swiss Development Agency. In 2004 a co-production agreement was reached with Hayfilm, the Armenian State studio. The shooting of the Armenian part of the film began in July 2005, until October. 2006 saw a contribution from the Norwegian Film Fund for commencement of shootings in Norway, and a co-production agreement was reached with ORIGINAL FILM AS in July 2006, with the Norwegian part of the shooting beginning the same month.

Further contributions towards the production were received from the Hubert Bals Fund (October 2006), the SDC-Swiss Development Agency (May 2008), the Armenian Ministry of Culture (March 2009), the Norwegian Ministry of Foreign Affairs (May 2009), and Russian distribution company Paradise (May 2009). Production was completed in June 2009.

== Awards and honours ==
Year	Award/Honour	Awarding body	Location	Ref
2009	Second prize for Best Feature Film	Pomegranate International Film Festival	Toronto, Canada	
2009	Best Actress (Laurence Ritter)	Orenburg International Film Festival	Orenburg, Russia	
2009	Medal of the Ministry of Defence (Hovhannes Galstyan)	Ministry of Defence of the Russian Federation, Volokolmsk's Border International Film Festival	Volokolamsk, Russia	
2010	Best Dramatic Film (Special Jury Prize)	WorldFest-Houston International Film Festival	Houston, Texas, USA	
2010	Best Script Award	Arpa International Film Festival	Los Angeles, California, USA	
