= Lost & Found in Armenia =

- Directed by: Gor Kirakosian
- Written by: Gor Kirakosian; Krist Manaryan; Narek Ghaplanyan
- Produced by: Valerie McCaffrey, Maral Djerejian
- Starring: Jamie Kennedy; Angela Sarafyan
- Cinematography: Filip Vandewal
- Edited by: Gor Kirakosian
- Music by: Narek Ghaplanyan
- Production company: Red Tie Films
- Release date: November 22, 2012
- Running time: 100 min.
- Countries: United States; Armenia
- Languages: English, Armenian, Turkish, Russian

Lost & Found in Armenia is an American comedy written and directed by Gor Kirakosian, starring Jamie Kennedy and Angela Sarafyan. The film was completed in 2012, and, was released to select US theaters and on-demand video on June 7, 2013.

== Plot ==
A US senator's son, Bill (Jamie Kennedy), who attempts to forget the breakup with his fiancée, is forced to vacation in Turkey with his best friends. During forced parasailing, he is caught in a plane’s tire. He falls from the plane, crashing into a barn in a small village in Armenia, where he is accused of being a Turkish-Azeri spy as he says 3 basic phrases in Turkish, and asks the locals if they are Turks.

He is locked in a basement where the locals keep watch on him. A local who can speak Turkish-Azeri is taken to interrogate him, and fails. Another local is brought to interrogate him after claiming he speaks English. However, he lied, and speaks some Italian instead. A young woman named Ani (Angela Sarafyan) comes home from Yerevan after learning English. When Grandpa Matsak (Michael Poghosyan) discovers this, she is summoned to interrogate him, which turns out to be a success. Although, Bill is saying he is American, the locals don’t believe him.

Hovnatahn (David Tovmasyan) tries hitting on Ani, and fails. On the news, the locals find out he is an American who was declared missing in Turkey. When the news is spread, the locals go to the basement where Bill is imprisoned, only to find out he escaped. While Bill attempts to flee, and is knocked out by a rake, a manhunt is declared.

On the next day, Bill encounters Ani, and talks with her. Meanwhile, Hovnatahn, his father (who is the mayor of the village), and mother meet Ani's mother to propose an arranged marriage. It is declined when Ani comes home with Bill. She learns that the locals want him to leave.

On the next day, Ani takes Bill to her relatives graves and talks about Armenians suffering during the war in Artsakh, she is later kidnapped by Hovnatahn and his friend Bldo (Vache Tovmasyan). While they’re driving, the car’s brakes stop working. Bldo chickens out, and escapes the car. Hovnatahn and Ani crash and are kidnapped by soldiers of the Azerbaijani Army. The Azeris threaten to assault Ani in front of Hovnatahn, then kill both of them. Bill finds the post, and knocks out one Azeri soldier. He threatens to shoot the other, but fails. As the Azeri soldier is about to kill Bill, he is knocked out by Bldo who came back to save Hovnatahn and Ani.

In the night, the locals celebrate, and congratulate Bill for his heroism, and as an apology for mis-naming him as a Turkish-Azeri spy. In the morning, Bill is going home. Ani is holding back her sadness, because she loves him. In the last seconds, a silhouette of Bill is walking to Ani and embrace, starting a new relationship.

== Cast ==
- Jaime Kennedy as Bill
- Angela Sarafyan as Ani
- Dave Sheridan as George
- Serdar Kalsin as Ahmed
- Alex Kalognomos as TV/Interview Reporter
- Jayda Berkmen as News Anchor
- Mark Geragos as himself
- Michael Poghosyan as Grandpa Matsak
- Arsen Grigoryan as Arshak
- Hrant Tokhatyan as Alexan
- Levon Haroutyunyan as Hakob
- Davit Tovmasyan as Hovnatan
- Vache Tovmasyan as Bldo
