= Fate as a Rat =

2001 film by Ivan Pavlov

Fate as a Rat (Bulgarian: Съдбата като плъх) is a 2001 Bulgarian film directed by Ivan Pavlov. It was Bulgaria's submission to the 74th Academy Awards for the Academy Award for Best Foreign Language Film, but eventually was not nominated.

== See also ==
- Cinema of Bulgaria
- List of submissions to the 74th Academy Awards for Best Foreign Language Film
- List of Bulgarian submissions for the Academy Award for Best International Feature Film
