= Songs of Solomon =

2019 film

- Directed by: Arman Nshanian
- Screenplay by: Audrey Gevorkian
- Story by: Sylvia Kavoukjian
- Based on: The historic Armenian figure, Komitas Vardabet, and the Armenian genocide
- Produced by: Arman Nshanian; Asko Akopyan; Nick Vallelonga
- Starring: Samvel Tadevosian; Arman Nshanian; Sos Janibekyan; Arevik Gevorgyan; Tatev Hovakimyan; Jean-Pierre Nshanian; Artashes Aleksanyan
- Cinematography: Anthony J. Rickert-Epstein
- Edited by: Anthony J. Rickert-Epstein
- Music by: Andranik Berberyan
- Production companies: People of AR Productions; Oscar Gold Productions; Aneva Productions; Vallelonga Productions
- Release date: October 19, 2019 (premiere)
- Running time: 100 minutes
- Country: Armenia
- Language: Armenian

Songs of Solomon (Armenian: Սողոմոնի երգերը, romanized: Soghomoni yergery) is a 2019 period biographical drama film directed by Arman Nshanian, depicting the life and music of Komitas Vardabet, who was an Armenian composer, ethnomusicologist and priest, who lived during the years of the Armenian genocide. The movie was selected by Armenia to compete in the 93rd Academy Awards, but it was not nominated.

== Production ==
A relative of story writer Sylvia Kavoukjian shared a story about her grandmother, who was a small child during this period of the Armenian Genocide. She had a friendship with a Turkish girl, and they eventually became characters in the film, but made older by Kavoukjian. The reason was that Kavoukjian wanted to include the character of Komitas and his music in the story, since he lived in the same time era of the Genocide, in order to present the characters as peers. This story would eventually become the seed of the film's storyline. Nshanyan wanted to make it into a short film, but was persuaded by the producer, Asko Akopyan, to make it into a full feature film. Nshanyan then worked on the screenplay with screenwriter Audrey Gevorkian, and helped with pre-production.

The film was therefore centered around the music of Komitas. It also displays the life of Komitas (1869–1935) before and up to the Armenian Genocide.

The production of the film was set in Armenia. The director is Arman Nshanian. The producers are Arman Nshanian, Oscar-winning Green Book producer and co-writer Nick Vallelonga and Asko Akopyan.

According to Nshanyan, the Armenian locals were very helpful to the production.

== Release ==
The film premiered on 19 October 2019, at the Chinese Theatre in Hollywood, Los Angeles, with the entire cast and crew.

The film was then set to be released to theatres on 24 April 2020, in Armenia - the same date in which Armenians commemorate the victims of the Armenian Genocide; however, due to the COVID-19 pandemic, the release was indefinitely postponed. However, in an interview with VoyageLA, screenwriter Audrey Gevorkian stated that the film would be premiering in September 2020 in Armenia.

The film was selected to be shown at several movie festivals of 2020: Ischia Global Film & Music Festival, Rhode Island International Film Festival, Dances With Films, Ojai Film Festival, Madrid International Film Festival, ARFF Paris International Film Festival, and San Antonio Film Festival.

The film was selected to represent Armenia in the 93rd Academy Awards for the "Best Foreign Language Film" category in 2021.

In January 2021, the film was acquired by Cloudburst Entertainment, which planned to release it in the same year. In August of the same year, it was announced via the film's official Facebook page that Songs of Solomon was globally available from 10 September 2021.

== Reception ==
Although not released in cinemas worldwide, the movie was chosen by the Armenian National Film Academy to be competing in the "Best Foreign Language Film"-category at the 93rd Annual Academy Awards, which was held on April 23, 2021. The film did not receive a nomination, however.

== See also ==
- List of submissions to the 93rd Academy Awards for Best International Feature Film
- List of Armenian submissions for the Academy Award for Best International Feature Film
