= Earthquake (2016 film) =

2016 film

- Film poster
- Directed by: Sarik Andreasyan
- Written by: Grant Barsegyan; Arsen Danielyan; Aleksey Gravitskiy; Sergey Yudakov; Marty Bowen
- Produced by: Gevond Andreasyan; Sarik Andreasyan; Ruben Dishdishyan; Aram Movsesyan; Marty Bowen
- Starring: Konstantin Lavronenko; Maria Mironova
- Cinematography: Yuriy Korobeynikov
- Distributed by: Karoprokat
- Release date: 25 July 2016
- Running time: 101 minutes
- Country: Armenia
- Languages: Armenian; Russian
- Box office: $3.6 million

Earthquake (Armenian: Երկրաշարժ, romanized: Yerkrasharzh; Russian: Землетрясение, romanized: Zemletryaseniye) is a 2016 Russian-Armenian disaster drama film directed by Sarik Andreasyan based on the 1988 Armenian earthquake. It was selected as the Armenian entry for the Best Foreign Language Film at the 89th Academy Awards. However, the film was disqualified by the Academy for not meeting the submission requirements.

== Cast ==
- Sebastien Sisak as Didier, a cynologist
- Sabina Akhmedova as Gayane
- Konstantin Lavronenko as Konstantin Berezhnoy
- Artyom Bystrov as a hoistman
- Armen Margaryan as Armen
- Arsen Grigoryan as Ryzhiy
- Maria Mironova as Anna Berezhnaya
- Michael Poghosyan as Erem

== Box office ==
According to Box Office Mojo, Earthquake grossed $3.6 million in Russia and ex-Soviet countries, against a budget of RUB 200,000,000 (approximately $3.3 million in 2016), according to Kinopoisk.

== Reception ==
Critical reception of the film in Russian media ranged from mixed to positive. Earthquake had the best critical reception of all films directed by Sarik Andreasyan.

== See also ==
- List of submissions to the 89th Academy Awards for Best Foreign Language Film
- List of Armenian submissions for the Academy Award for Best Foreign Language Film
