= Vahram Sahakian =

Armenian dramatist, film director and actor

Vahram Sahakyan
- Վահրամ Սահակյան
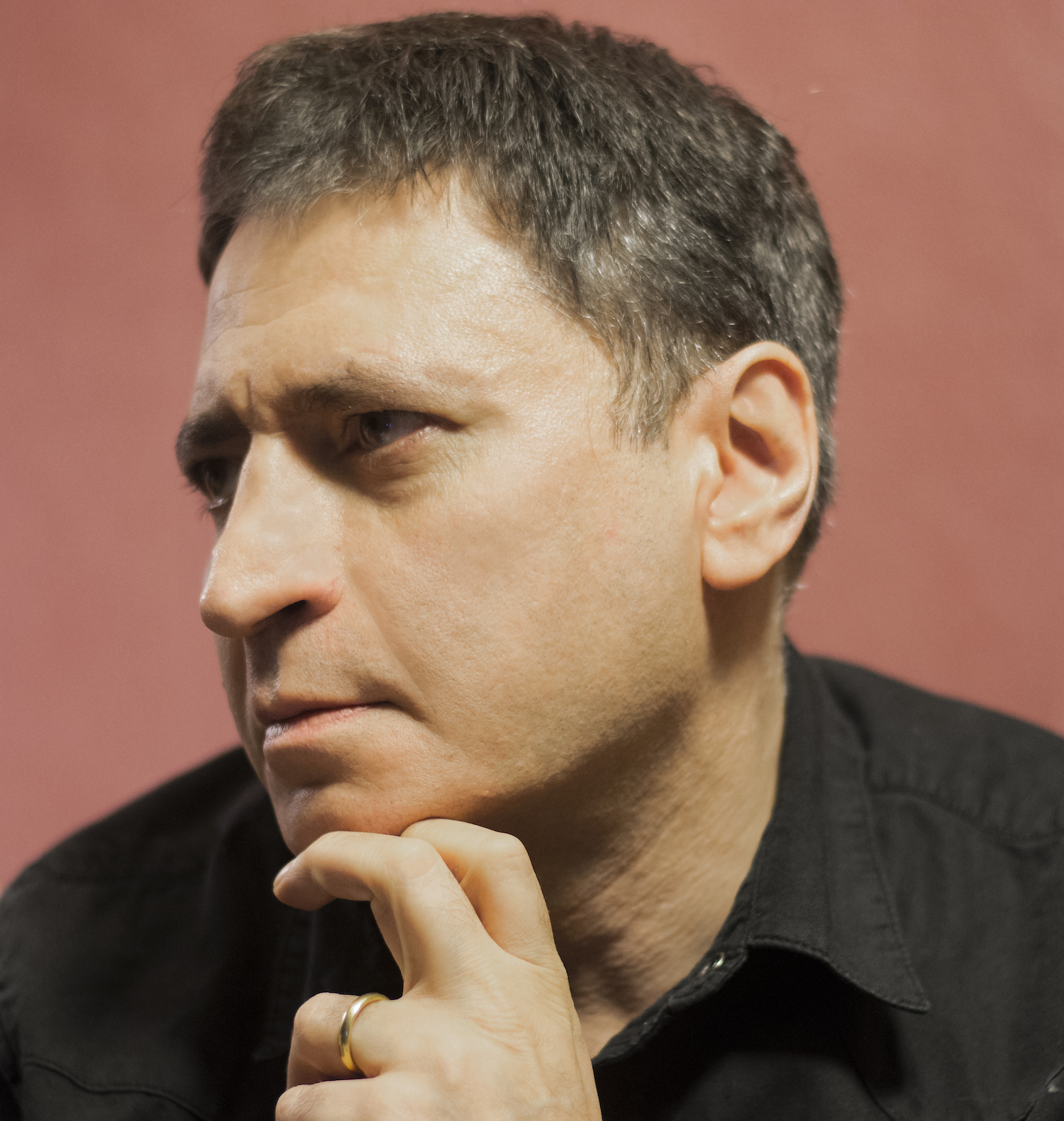
- Vahram Sahakian at 2015
- Born: 22 September 1968 (age 57); Yerevan, Armenian SSR
- Occupations: writer, playwright, director, actor
- Years active: 1987—present
- Style: dramaturgy
- Father: Aram Sahakyan

Vahram Sahakyan, Armenian: Վահրամ Սահակյան, born 22 September 1968, Yerevan, Armenian SSR) is an Armenian writer, playwright, screenwriter, producer, composer, director and actor, Honored Cultural Figure of Armenia (2016).

== Activity ==
Together with satirist Vardan Petrosyan, he founded a comedy theater studio called "Vozniner" (Hedgehogs), the first Armenian private youth theater. Sahakyan is the author of numerous articles, short stories, novels, plays and film scripts. His literature is distinguished by the free use of vocabulary, including street curses, elements of cynicism and the tragicomedy genre. He actively collaborates with director Artur Sahakyan, producer Armen Hambardzumyan, actors Hrant Tokhatyan and Samson Stepanyan.

He is known for his active civic position: he condemns the law on the use of euthanasia for terminally ill children, the idea of cloning and abortion, but does not object to organ donation in the event of death. He has repeatedly spoken critically about politicians and officials, organizing symbolic protests from wanting to leave the country due to threats in 2009 to tearing up his passport in front of the National Assembly of Armenia in 2012. Nevertheless, he believes that negative phenomena in the world are “the embodiment and result specifically” of someone’s guilt, and not just the negative actions of politicians.

On July 5, 2017, he was beaten by Yervand.

== Plays ==
=== Dramaturgy ===
- Rye Key (2009)
- Two friends, to Say Nothing of the Life (2006)
- Why roars City (2003)
- Mea Culpa (My Fault) (2002)
- Hello, I'm Staying (2000)
- Khatabalada (1996)
- Once upon a time in Armenia (1991)
- That Very Pepo (1990)
- Vozniner in Air (1988), (featuring Vardan Petrosyan)

=== Screenplays ===
- Yerevan – Los angeles – Yerevan (1992)

== Selected bibliography ==
- Eyes black, white tablecloth (2002) (Romance)
- Brutes (2005) Essayes
- Eternal gallows (2008) (Romance)

== Filmography ==
- The scoundrel Armenian (2020), director
- Armenian sex (2011, not completed), director
- Death Pirate (2007), director
- Les Bavardes Tres libre-3 (2006), director
- Film-Prison (2005), director
- Vardan and Margarita (2004), director
- Les Bavardes Tres libre 2 (2003), director
- World cattle (2002), director
- Les Bavardes Tres libre, (2000) director
- Le tous dernier tango a Paris -2, (1998) director, actor (featuring with Vardan Petrosyan)
- Mer Verje – Our end (1998) director, actor
- Policie (1995) director
- Every way (1993) director, actor
- Le tous dernier tango a Paris (1992) director, actor (featuring with Vardan Petrosyan)
- Once upon a time in Yerevan (1991) director
