= Yasha and Leonid Brezhnev =

- Promotional release poster
- Directed by: Edgar Baghdasaryan
- Written by: Edgar Baghdasaryan
- Produced by: Karine Simonyan
- Starring: Mais Sarkisyan
- Cinematography: Suren Tadevosyan
- Edited by: Narek Khachaturian; Alexander Baghdasaryan
- Music by: Andranik Berberyan
- Production companies: Edgar Baghdasaryan Film Production; National Cinema Centre of Armenia
- Distributed by: Storyboard Media
- Release date: July 10, 2024 (GAIFF)
- Running time: 100 minutes
- Countries: Armenia; Russia
- Languages: Armenian; Russian

Yasha and Leonid Brezhnev (Armenian: Յաշան և Լեոնիդ Բրեժնևը) is a 2024 absurdist tragicomedy film written and directed by Edgar Baghdasaryan. Starring Mais Sarkisyan as a retired Armenian reluctant to accept the dissolution of the Soviet Union imagines conversations with former Soviet leader Leonid Brezhnev and other communist leaders.

It was selected as the Armenian entry for the Best International Feature Film at the 97th Academy Awards, but was not nominated.

== Synopsis ==
Yasha is an old, retired man who remembers one of the highlights of his career: participating as a delegate of the Communist Party of the Soviet Union in 1976. However, his future seems repellent when he faces the reality where the USSR dissolved then he tries to hold on to the past. As part of his ineptitude for the new he imagines political conversations with former Soviet leader Leonid Brezhnev and other prominent communist figures. At the same time, Yasha swears loyalty to him which creates problems for his family.

== Cast ==
- Mais Sarkisyan as Yasha
- Maksim Vitorgan as Leonid Brezhnev
- Lilit Salnazaryan as Valya
- Avital Lvova as Elena Ceausescu
- Georgy Engelgard as Fidel Castro
- Igor Emelin as Yuri Andropov
- Ruzanna Khachatryan
- Arsen Chachoyan
- Nazir Zhukov
- Samad Mansurov
- Irina Abrosimova
- Zita Badalyan

== Release ==
It had its world premiere on July 10, 2024, at the 21st Yerevan Golden Apricot Yerevan International Film Festival, then screened on August 17, 2024, at the Armenian Film Festival Australia, and on September 6, 2024, at the Armenian Film Festival in Los Angeles.

== Accolades ==
Year	Award	Category	Recipient	Result	Ref.
2024	4th Anahit Awards	Best Director	Edgar Baghdasaryan	Won	
2024	4th Anahit Awards	Best Actor	Mais Sarkisyan	Won	
2024	4th Anahit Awards	Best Cinematography	Suren Tadevosyan	Won	
2024	4th Anahit Awards	Best Screenplay	Edgar Baghdasaryan	Won	
2024	4th Anahit Awards	Best Sound	Tigran Kuzikyan	Won	

== See also ==
- List of submissions to the 97th Academy Awards for Best International Feature Film
- List of Armenian submissions for the Academy Award for Best International Feature Film
