= Hovhannes Babakhanyan =

Armenian-American actor and singer (born 1968)

- Հովհաննես Բաբախանյան
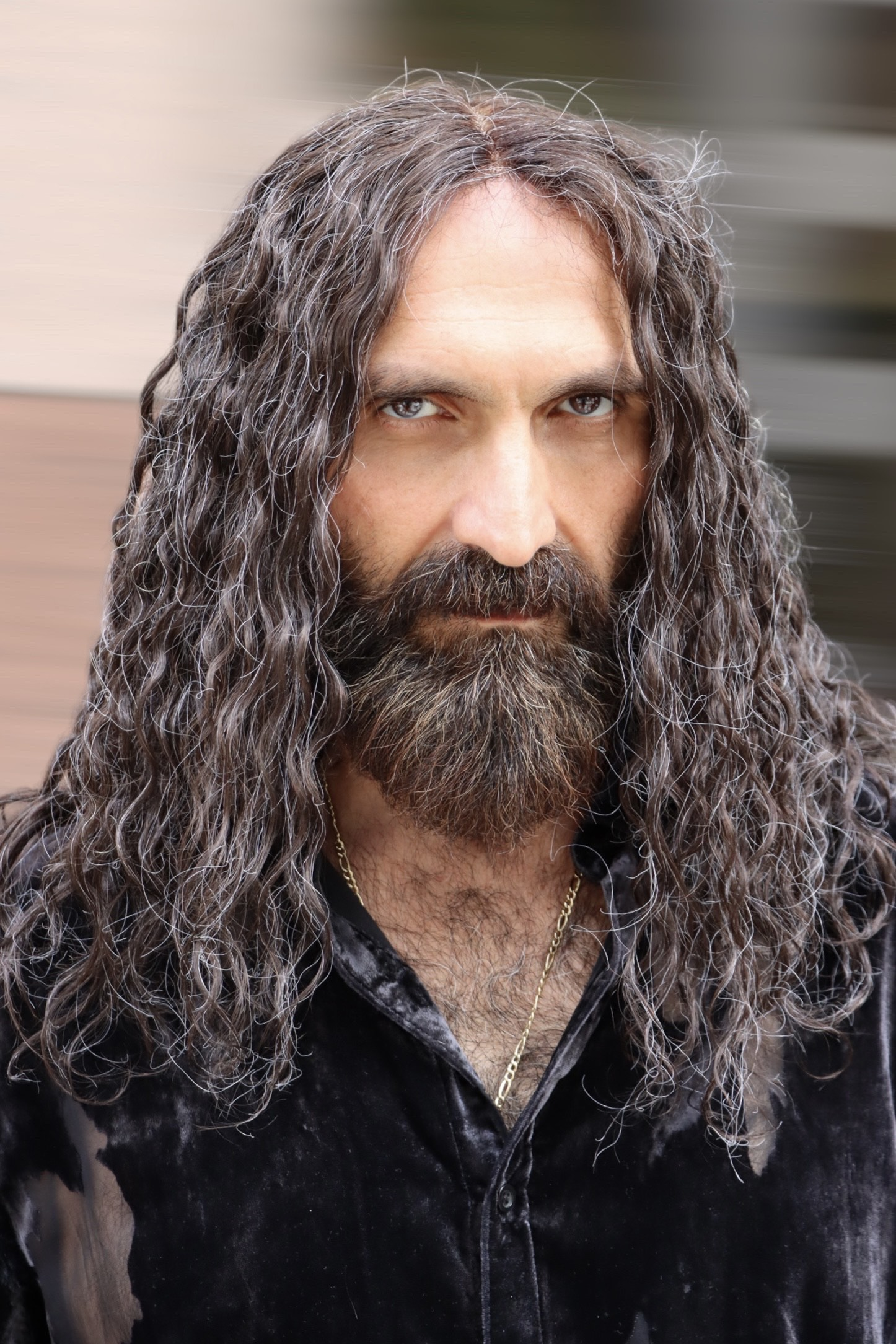
- Born: 1 December 1968 (age 57); Yerevan, Armenia
- Occupations: Actor and singer
- Years active: since 1984

Hovhannes Gerasimi Babakhanyan (Armenian: Հովհաննես Գերասիմի Բաբախանյան) is an Armenian-American actor and singer. On March 27, 2006, Babakhanyan received the title "Honored Actor of the Republic of Armenia".

== Early life and education ==
Born on July 1, 1968, Babakhanyan attended the Yerevan State Institute of Theatre and Cinematography after graduation from high school in 1984.

== Career ==
In 2010, Babakhanyan immigrated to the United States with his wife and children. Babakhanyan started his life in the States in New York City, performing the works of Sayat Nova for Armenian Cultural Associations at St. Thomas Church on March 20, 2010. In 2014, Babakhanyan was honored at the Friendship Appreciation Awards Ceremony.

In 2018, Babakhanyan appeared as Arpad in the CBS television series S.W.A.T.

In 2022, Babakhanyan starred in the film Cagliostro by Ruben Kochar, which was nominated for the Best Short Film Award at the ARPA International film festival.
