= Marie Rose Abousefian =

Armenian actress, writer

- Մարի Ռոզ Աբուսէֆեան
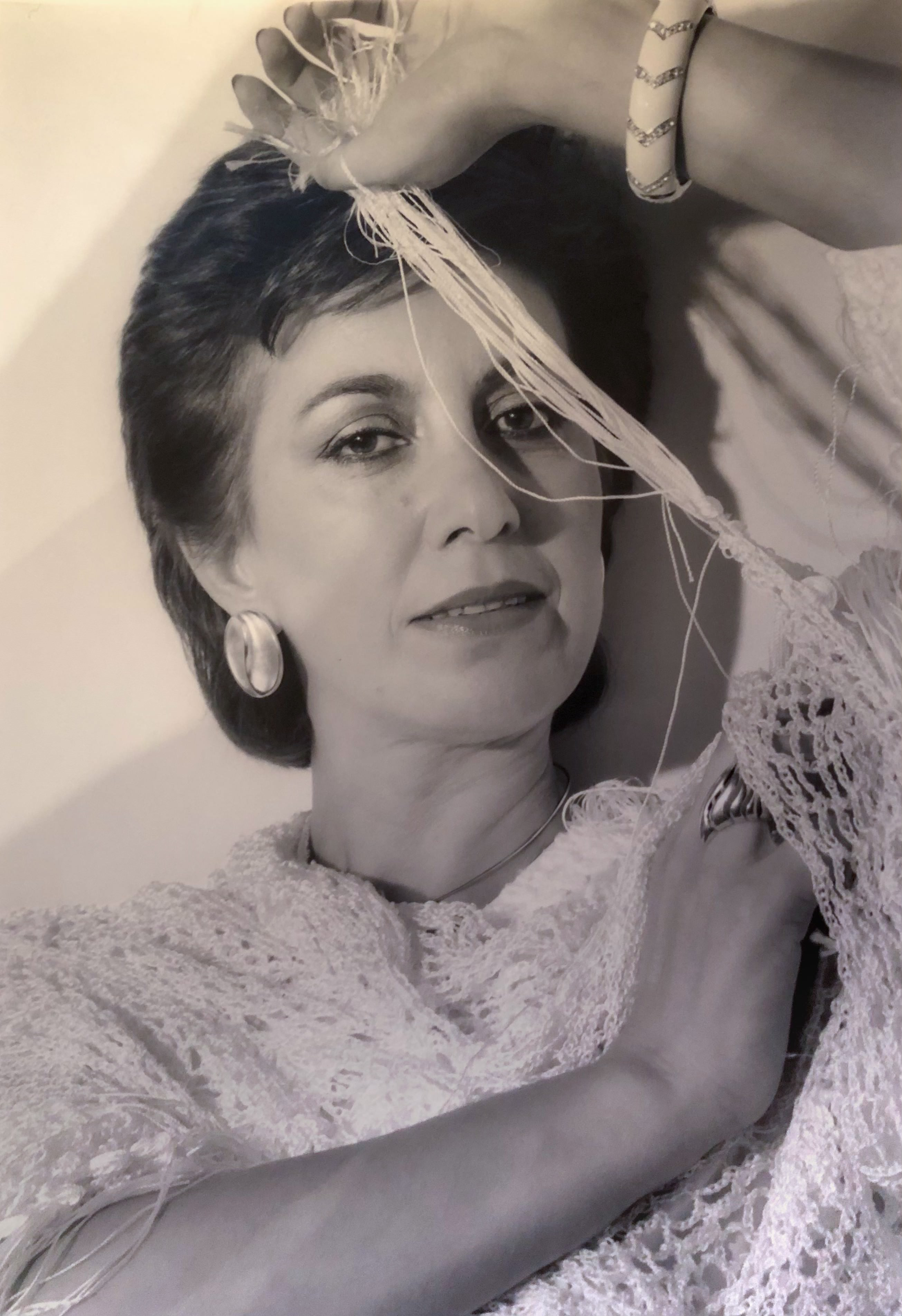
- Born: Aleppo, Syria
- Occupations: Actress, Writer, Researcher
- Spouse: Ara Shiraz (m. 1967; div. 1971) Armen Shamamian (m. 1988)
- Children: Lusine (LuLu) Shiraz
- Website: marieroseabousefian.jimdofree.com

Marie Rose Abousefian (Armenian: Մարի Ռոզ Աբուսէֆեան) is an Armenian actress, writer, researcher, columnist, poet and stage director who has investigated historical literature, poetry and prose, portraying human tragedy and the Armenian genocide. She is also involved in researching the topics of national identity, human rights, women's rights and the rights of the Armenian people.

== Career ==
Abousefian studied at the State Academy of Fine Arts of Armenia. She began working at the Arshaluys Theatre as a leading actress and later joined the Yerevan Dramatic Theatre (now known as the Hrachya Ghaplanyan Drama Theatre). During this time, she took on numerous roles in television, radio, and literary and theatrical shows filmed by Hayfilm.

In 1983, she emigrated to San Francisco, where she continued her career in acting. Here, she began her "One Woman" performances (acting as different characters, producing the lighting, set design, music and script). In the meantime, she formed the "Saroyan Theatre" of Hamazkayin, San Francisco, where she volunteered as a producer for five years.

Her career in performing arts, film and theatre includes roles as a playwright, director and actress. She has written, produced and published many audio recordings, including dramatisations of the Armenian genocide and the lives of writers, musicians and historical figures. Her "One Woman" dramatic performances have toured numerous cities across Armenia, the United States, Canada, Europe, the Middle East and Australia.

Abousefian's literary works appear in publications in Armenia and throughout the Armenian Diaspora. She frequently writes newspaper articles for Asbarez, Aztag, Azat Or, Hairenik and Horizon Weekly.

She was awarded the Commemorative Gold Medal of Honour by the Ministry of Culture of Armenia in 2010.

In 2013, she was conferred a Doctorate in Literature and Philosophy (Ph.D) by the M. Abeghyan Institute of Literature of the Armenian National Academy of Sciences. Her doctoral thesis was on the Hundred and One Year Trilogy and The Pierced Pot, novels by the 20th century Armenian writer, Hagop Oshagan. Her supervisor was Professor Sergey Sarinyan.

Abousefian is a member of the International Congress of Armenia. She is also a member of the Ararat International Academy of Sciences (AIAS) in Paris, France. In 2015, the AIAS awarded her the 100th Anniversary Medal of the Armenian Genocide. Representing the AIAS, she attends annual World Scientific Congresses in Paris, Geneva and Brussels.

In 2017, she was given the title of "Professor of International Relations and Diplomacy" by the International University of Fundamental Studies (IUFS) in Moscow, Russia.

== Works ==
=== Filmography ===
Abousefian has featured in various Armenian films, acting alongside many well-known actors including Frunzik Mkrtchyan, Avet Avetisyan, Sofiko Chiaureli, Varduhi Varderesyan, Vladimir Msryan and Verjaluys Mirijanyan.

- Morgan's Relative / Մորգանի խնամին (1970)
- Blonde Plane / Շեկ Ինքնաթիռ (1975)
- Arevik (1978)
- Oh, Gevorg / Օ՜, Գևորգ (1979)
- A Piece of Sky / Կտոր մը երկինք (1980)

=== Performances ===
All stage performances are adapted from original texts to plays by Abousefian. Among her works are:

- Ever-Tolling Bell Tower - Paruyr Sevak
- From Kars to Troy - Vardges Petrosyan
- Krikor Zohrab on the Road to Golgotha
- Payrur Sevak's Great Love
- Remnants - Hagop Oshagan
- Rendezvous with Love
- The Bride of Dadrakom - Gostan Zarian
- The Madman - Matheos Zarifian
- The Pierced Pot - Hagop Oshagan
- The Trial of Soghomon Tehlirian
- The 40 Days of Musa Dagh - Franz Werfel
- This Evening with Vahan Terian
- Tigran the Great

=== Papers ===
- Reflection of the Armenian Genocide in the works of Hakob Oshagan / Հայոց ցեղասպանության արտացոլումը Հակոբ Օշականի գործերում (2013)
- Germany's Responsibility in the Armenian Genocide (2015)
- The Importance of National Identity (2016)
- The World Needs Peace (2019)
- Taniel Varoujan: Life, Work and Times (2019)
- Hagop Oshagan: Short Story Reflections on the Armenian Genocide (2022)
- Avetik Isahakyan: A Comet over the Armenian Homeland (2025)
- Misak Medzarents: The Messenger of Selfless Happiness (2026)

=== Books ===
- With Paths of the Mind and Spirit / Հոգու եւ Մտքի Արահետներով (2005)
- Hundred and One Year Trilogy / Հարյուր Մեկ Տարվա Եռերգությունը (2011) ISBN 978-9939-832-21-9
- Time, stop! / Կա՛նգ առ ժամանակ… (2026) ISBN 978-5-8080-1595-1
