= Vahagn Hayrapetyan =

Armenian jazz pianist

Vahagn Hayrapetyan Վահագն Հայրապետյան
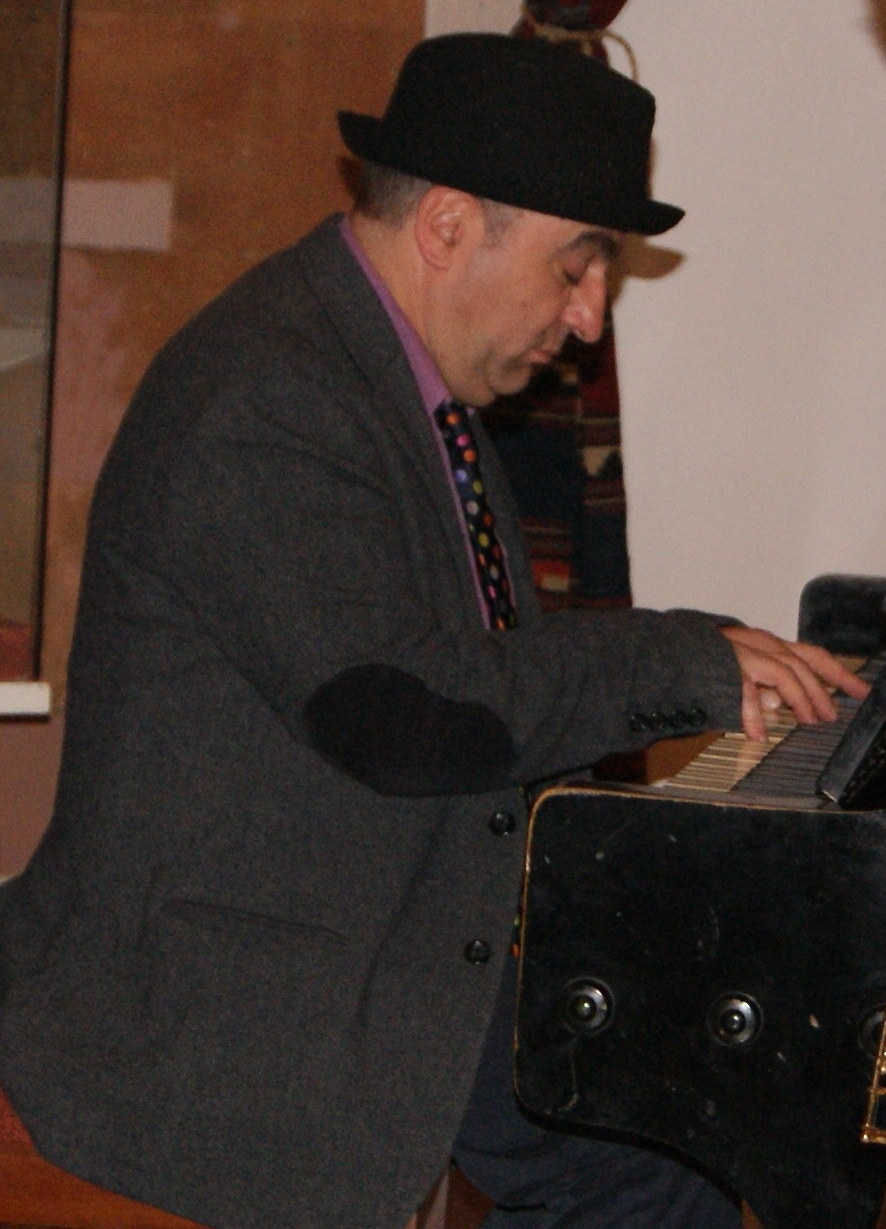
- Hayrapetyan performing at the Folk Arts Center in 2015

Background information
- Born: Vahagn Hayrapetyan; August 30, 1968 (age 57)
- Genres: Jazz
- Occupation(s): Musician, composer
- Instrument(s): Piano, vocals

Vahagn Hayrapetyan (Armenian: Վահագն Հայրապետյան) (born August 30, 1968) is an Armenian jazz pianist, singer and composer.

== Biography ==
Vahagn Hayrapetyan was born in Yerevan in the family of fiddler Karapet Hayrapetyan and Alice Adamyan. He graduated from the Tchaikovsky Music School and Yerevan State Conservatory as pianist and composer. Vahagn learned from Barry Harris and Frank Hewitt in New York City and worked and performed with many prominent jazz musicians such as Elvin Jones, Jimmie Lovelace, Leroy Williams, Ari Roland, Zaid Nasser, Chris Byears, Yaala Baalin, Keith Baala, Jason and Delfeo Marsalis and many more.

In New Orleans Vahagn recorded and released three albums:

- "Love for sale" with Clarence Johnson III
- "Tripp to New Orleans" with Johnny Vidakovich and Ed Wise
- "Bop it up" with Wendell Brunious, Brice Winston, Bill Huntington and Jason Marsalis

Vahagn took part in many international jazz festivals – Jazz Jamboree, St. Petersburg International Jazz Festival, Moscow vocal International Jazz Festival, New Orleans Jazz Fest du Maurier, Montreal Jazz Festival etc.

Since 1980's Vahagn is the leader of his Jazz Trio and Quartet in Yerevan, since 1998 he is the pianist and keyboard player of Armenian Navy Band. In 2004 he created his own band "Katuner" (the "Cats").

Vahagn Hayrapetyan's first solo album "Singin" and Swingin" was recorded in 2010.

Vahagn often performs in Moscow jazz clubs 'Esse'. He performs with Russian jazz musicians such as Igor and Oleg Butman, Sergey Golovnya, Yakov Okun, Sergey Vasilyev, Pavel Temofeev, Peter Vostokov and others. He also has collaborated with Russia's jazz pianist Daniil Kramer and their first duo album "Live in Yekaterinburg" was released in 2013.

Vahagn has also been teaching jazz in Yerevan, Syria, Iran, Lebanon and Jordan.

== Movies ==
Vahagn is the author of the sound tracks for movies:

- "Bonded Parallels"
- "If Only Everyone" (the award of Beijing International Movie Festival)
- "Shor and Shor Shor"

== Awards ==
- Honored Artist of Armenia, 2008.
