= Vardan Petrosyan =

Actor, scriptwriter, parodist

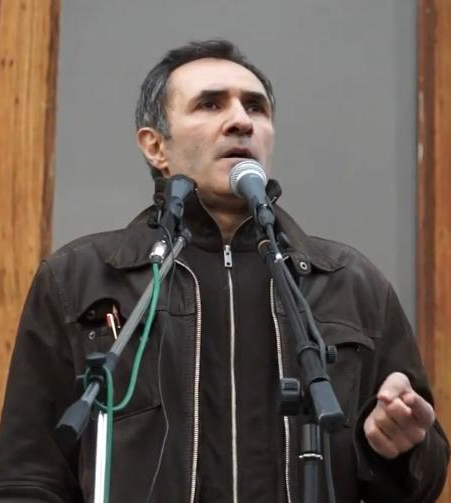
- Petrosyan giving a speech at Freedom Square, Yerevan during the February 2013 protests
- Born: February 27, 1959 (age 67); Yerevan, Armenian SSR, Soviet Union
- Years active: 1981–present
- Style: One-person show

Vardan Petrosyan (Armenian: Վարդան Պետրոսյան; born February 27, 1959) is an Armenian actor, scriptwriter, and parodist. He is based in Paris and Yerevan and holds a dual Armenian and French nationality. Petrosyan is widely considered one of the greatest contemporary Armenian actors, touching various issues such as the Armenian genocide, Armenian politics and foreign affairs in his performances.

== Biography ==
Vardan Petrosyan was born on February 27, 1959, in Yerevan, Soviet Armenia. He graduated from the Terlemezian Art College in 1983. His father died in 1981, when he was 22 years old. After a two-year service in the Soviet Army, he returned to Yerevan in 1985 to establish—with Vahram Sahakian—the private theatre studio called Vozniner (Ոզնիներ, "Hedgehogs"). Between 1988 and 1992, when the Karabakh movement was in progress, Petrosyan wrote and staged several politically motivated performances. Until 1997, he played in short and feature films. Due to the harsh economic conditions in Armenia, Petrosyan moved to Paris in 1992. He appeared in several French plays.

Beginning in 2000, Vardan Petrosyan has been mainly performing one-man shows on various politics and social issues. Besides Armenia, he has also performed for the Armenian diaspora communities in the United States, France, Canada, Lebanon, Iran, Syria, Russia, etc.

=== 2013 car accident ===
On October 20, 2013, Vardan Petrosyan got into a car accident on Yerevan-Yeghvard highway, where two sixteen-year-old boys died and four others were injured, including Petrosyan. After being treated in a Yerevan hospital, on November 9, Petrosyan was charged with "negligent breach of traffic rules, which causes death" and was taken into custody. The court rejected pleas to have him released on bail, despite a petition that eventually garnered 11,000 signatures. Petrosyan pleaded not guilty on January 26, 2015. He was sentenced to five years in prison on January 29, 2015, by a lower court in Kotayk Province. Petrosyan was released on September 2, 2015, and served the rest of his punishment outside prison. He was released in March 2017.

== Performances and filmography ==
Name	Original name	Date	Note
The Latest Tango in Paris	Ամենավերջին տանգոն Փարիզում	1992	featuring Vahram Sahakian
The Latest Tango in Paris-2	Ամենավերջին տանգոն Փարիզում-2	1998	featuring Vahram Sahakian
Our End	Մեր վերջը	1999	
Playing 1700	Խաղում ենք 1700	2001	
Benefice	Բենեֆիս	2003	
In the fire	Կրակի մեջ	2004	
Ascent	ՎերԵլք	2006	
Love and Hatred	Սեր և ատելություն	2008	
What to do?	Ի՞նչ անել	2008	
The Lifers	Ցմահ բանտարկյալներ	2009	
Jokes of Fate	Ճակատագրի կատակներ	2010	
Sex Horror	Սեռասարսափ	2011	
Ladies and gentlemen, 50/50	Պարոնայք 50-50	2012	
Every Monday	Ամեն 2շաբթի	2013	
