= Symphony of Silence =

2001 film by Vigen Chaldranyan

- Directed by: Vigen Chaldranyan
- Starring: Michael Poghosian Karen Dzhanibekyan Jean-Pierre Nshanian Vladimir Msryan
- Release date: 2001

Symphony of Silence (Armenian: Լռության սիմֆոնիա); is a 2001 Armenian drama film directed by Vigen Chaldranyan. It was Armenia's submission to the 74th Academy Awards for the Academy Award for Best Foreign Language Film, but was not accepted as a nominee.

== Main cast ==
- Michael Poghosian
- Karen Dzhanibekyan
- Jean-Pierre Nshanian
- Vladimir Msryan

== See also ==
- Cinema of Armenia
- List of submissions to the 74th Academy Awards for Best Foreign Language Film
