= Ashot Adamyan =

Armenian actor

- Born: February 14, 1953 (age 73); Yerevan, Soviet Armenia
- Occupation: actor
- Years active: 1977–present

Ashot Karlovich Adamyan (Armenian: Աշոտ Ադամյա, 14 February 1953 in Yerevan) is an Armenian film and stage actor.

== Filmography ==
- 1977 - Bow to the Coming Day (starring)
- 1978 - Five More Days (as Hovik)
- 1980 - The Mute Witness (as investigator)
- 1980 - A Piece of Sky (A Slap) (as Torik)
- 1981 - Short Love Story (as shooting-range owner), short
- 1982 - A Drop of Honey (assistant director and starring)
- 1982 - Song of the Old Days (as Oberon)
- 1983 - The Master (as driver)
- 1983 - The Cost of Return (as Hayk)
- 1984 - We Shall Meet Again (as Natanael)
- 1984 - A Path into the Sky (starring), short
- 1985 - Where are You Going, Soldier? (as Hunan)
- 1986 - The Kite Day (in the episodes)
- 1989 - The Soviet Land, dir., short
- 1990 - On Behalf of Nation, dir., short
- 1990 - And if?, dir., short
- 1991 - Deadline Seven Days (starring)
- 1992 - Calendar (dir. Atom Egoyan, Canada-Armenia)
