= Arpa Foundation for Film, Music and Art =

- Arpa Foundation for Film, Music and Art
- Founded: 1995
- Founder: Sylvia Minassian
- Type: Non-profit
- Location: Los Angeles, California
- Region served: United States
- Method: Annual Arpa International Film Festival
- Key people: Sylvia Minassian (Chairwoman); Angelo Ghailian (Vice Chairman)
- Website: http://www.affma.org

Arpa Foundation for Film, Music and Art (AFFMA) is a Los Angeles-based non-profit organization, formed in 1995 for the purpose of promoting the arts of the Armenian diaspora; Arpa takes its name from the Arpa river, in Armenia and Azerbaijan.

AFFMA has been running its annual Arpa International Film Festival held in Hollywood, California since 1997. Arpa Film Festival claims to be one of the oldest independent film festivals in Hollywood, highlighting films that explore critical issues such as war, genocide, diaspora, dual identities, exile and multiculturalism. In 2021, the festival went virtual due to COVID, and 2022 marked the 25th anniversary of the festival.
