= Whirlwind (1988 film) =

1988 film

- Directed by: Bako Sadykov
- Written by: Bako Sadykov; Chingiz Aitmatov
- Starring: Vladimir Msryan
- Cinematography: Rifkat Ibragimov
- Edited by: V. Sadykova
- Release date: 1988
- Running time: 98 minutes
- Country: Soviet Union
- Language: Russian

Whirlwind (Russian: Смерч, romanized: Smerch) is a 1988 Soviet action film directed by Bako Sadykov. It was screened in the Un Certain Regard section at the 1989 Cannes Film Festival.

== Plot ==
Through the wasteland roams a mysterious tribe of people who call themselves the Whirlwind. Unlike others, they seek not food, clothing, or blood, but rather a meaning for their existence. The truth lies hidden beyond the horizon, somewhere in one of the world’s directions, toward which, in the end, the few survivors set out.

== Cast ==
- Vladimir Msryan
- Dumitru Fusu
- Mukhamadali Makhmadov
- Makhmud Takhiri
- Isfandiyor Gulyamov (as I. Gulyamov)
- Alfiya Nisambayeva
- Rustam Nugmagambetov
- Bobosaid Yatimov
- Dilorom Kambarova
- Rano Kubayeva
- Pyotr Krasichkov
- German Nurkhanov
- Dinmukhamet Akhimov
