= Hovhannes Galstyan =

Armenian film director

Hovhannes Galstyan (Armenian: Հովհաննես Գալստյան, born 12 December 1969, Yerevan, Armenian SSR) is an Armenian film director, writer and producer.

== Early life ==
Hovhannes Galstyan was born in 1969 in Yerevan. He obtained a Diploma of Feature Film Director in 1995 from the Yerevan State Pedagogical University, Department of Culture.

== Professional career ==
In 1998, he is the Founder and Director of the Private Look LLC, which organizes "Private Look " international film festivals of audio-visual arts and independent producers since 2000.

He wrote screenplays for three feature films, of which "Hump and Wings" was awarded by the Ministry of Culture of Armenia.

He produced and directed more than ten video/television films about children: Our Child is Growing-Amazing Days Chronology (Joint project with UNICEF). His debut was a short feature film " I dare to remember ", 35mm, in 1993. In 2003 he wrote the screenplay for the feature film "Bonded Parallels" and in 2005 he founded Parallels Film Production LLC, a company specially dedicated to the project "Bonded Parallels".
