= Hrachya Ghaplanyan Drama Theatre =

Theatre in Armenia

- Հրաչյա Ղափլանյանի անվան դրամատիկական թատրոն
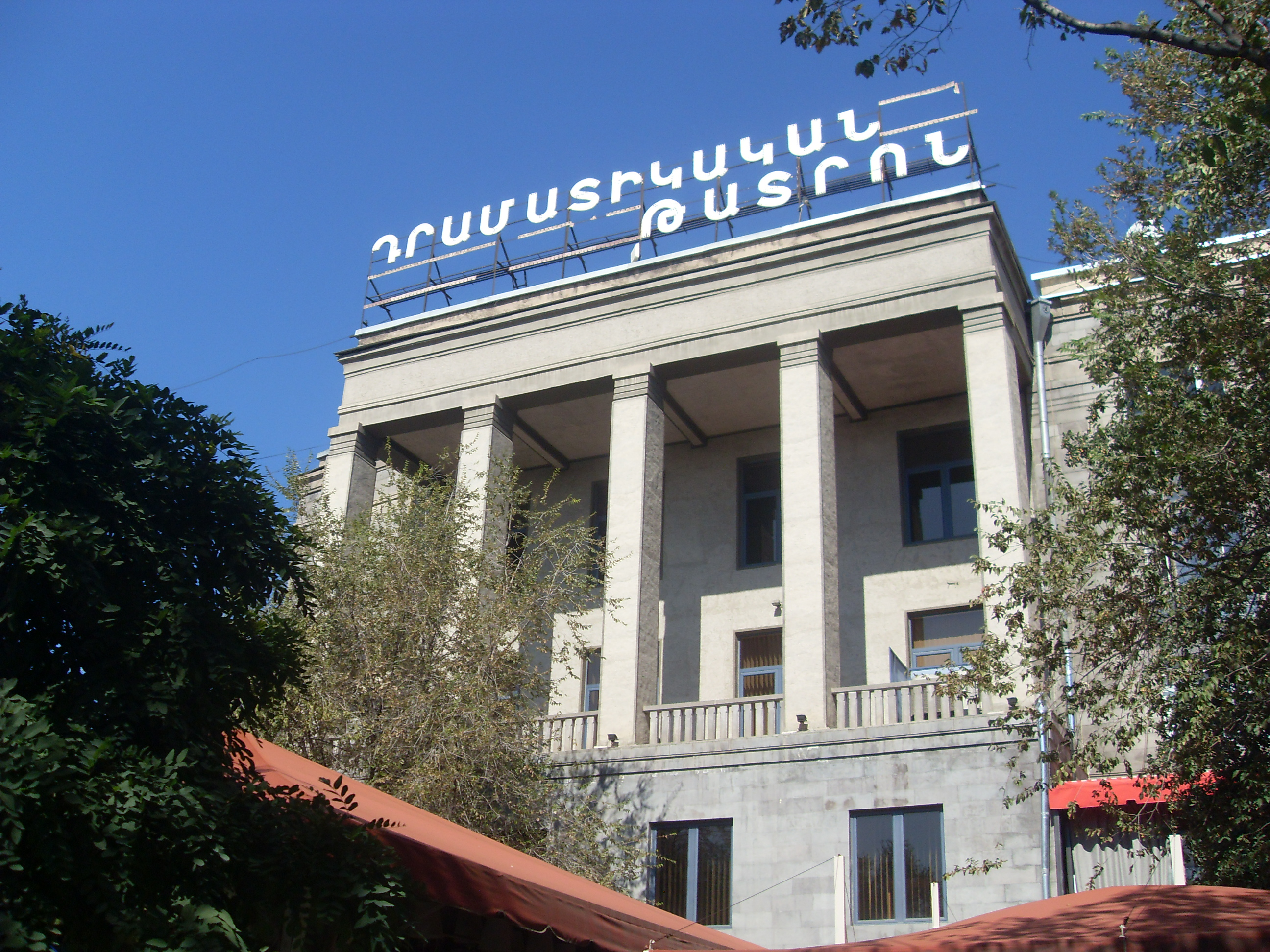
- Interactive map of Hrachya Ghaplanyan Drama Theatre
- Address: 28 Isahakyan Street; Yerevan; Armenia
- Coordinates: 40°11′20″N 44°31′12″E
- Type: Theatre

Construction
- Opened: 1967

Website
- Official website

Hrachya Ghaplanyan Drama Theatre (Armenian: Հրաչյա Ղափլանյանի անվան դրամատիկական թատրոն) is a municipal theatre founded in 1967 by Hrachya Ghaplanyan. It is located in the Kentron district of Yerevan, on 28 Isahakyan Street.

The theatre has toured Russia, the United States, Georgia, Bulgaria, Poland, England, Romania, and Hungary, and has participated in several Shakespeare festivals.

The theatre's program includes both classical and modern works, with over 100 plays having been staged in the theatre.

Famous actors who have performed at the theatre include Marie Rose Abousefian, Ashot Ghazaryan, Hrachya Ghazaryan, Rafael Kotanjyan, Evelina Shahiryan, Levon Sharafyan, and Anahit Topchyan.

Today, there are 15 performances in the theatre's repertoire.

== Theatre History and Architecture ==
n 1967, the Armenian Theatrical Company Theatre Studio was established with a performance of Vsevolod Vishnevsky's "An Optimistic Tragedy", directed by Hrachya Ghaplanyan. Two years later, in 1969, it was renamed the Ministry of Culture Yerevan Dramatic Theatre. The studio's artistic director at the time was Hrachya Ghaplanyan. [c]

The Hrachya Ghaplanyan Drama Theatre has been a vital part of Armenia's cultural scene since its founding. Recognized for its contributions to the Armenian theatrical development, the theatre has helped shape Armenian drama by supporting talented playwrights, directors, and actors. Over the years, it has brought both classic and modern plays to life, presenting both traditional and contemporary works. The theatre has hosted numerous plays that have contributed to the cultural and social aspect of Armenia. The theatre's history, artistic journey, and lasting impact on Armenian and international theatre are the most fundamental points for it. The theater is called the Dramatic Theater due to its ability to incorporate multiple theatrical directions within a single venue.

The Hrachya Ghaplanyan Drama Theatre was established during the Soviet era, when cultural institutions were influenced by state ideology, while remaining as a place where artistic expressionism was practiced. The theater director Hrachya Ghaplanyan had an idea for a theater with creative and technical standards, a place where Armenian and foreign dramas coexisted. His primary purpose for establishing the theater was to provide a space that did not adhere to any particular theatrical style. The founding of the theatre was part of a broader effort in Soviet Armenia to preserve national identity through the arts, despite political limitations.

Originally, the theatre did not have its own building. Its performances took place on the stage of the Yerevan City Soviet council building, which was not initially intended for theatrical productions. However, as the theatre grew in reputation and importance, the government eventually assigned the building to officially become a theatre, the building was officially redesigned and it became a regular venue for theater performances in Yerevan. Its design does not accommodate the technical and spatial requirements of a modern theater, making it difficult to stage productions effectively.

One of the major issues is accessibility, where viewers must go all the way to the third floor of the building in order to access the stage. Additionally, the lack of proper infrastructure affects both spectators and performers, limiting the overall functionality of the facility for theater performances.

== The Role of the Yerevan Dramatic Theatre in the Post-Ghaplanyan Era ==
After Ghaplanyan, the Yerevan Dramatic Theatre, broadened its repertory and adjusted to new theatrical trends. The theatre continued developing, incorporating both classic Armenian plays and new foreign plays into its repertoire [a]. It started focusing on performances with social and political content, also presenting new theatrical techniques that are influenced by contemporary trends.

== Dramatic theatre in the Late 20th and beginning of the 21st Century: A New Direction ==
The 1980s–1990s brought both challenges and new opportunities for Armenian dramatic theatre. During the Soviet period, Armenian theatre had to follow state-approved themes, but after Armenia's independence, theatre became a space for free artistic expression. Emerging playwrights experimented with social realism, depicting real struggles of the Armenian people.This period saw the rise of young directors who brought fresh perspectives to classical Armenian dramas. [b].

=== The Evolution of Dramatic Theatre in the 21st Century ===
Because of the Soviet Union Dramatic theatre was obligated to stage sovietized plays about revolution, war, liberty etc. They were strictly controlled, however it was balanced by the inclusion of elective performances. Some of the mandatory popular plays of that time were The Autumn Sun, Mornings Are Peaceful Here, and Old Gods. These plays reinforced Soviet ideology and influenced the audience through art. After the collapse of the Soviet Union this type of control was no longer relevant and the theater gained full freedom over its plays. This change brought a mix of traditional storytelling and contemporary. Experimental theatre became popular. Increased use of multimedia, digital effects, and immersive performances. Plays began addressing contemporary issues such as war, migration, and cultural identity. Armenian theatre took on a new responsibility to reflect the changing realities of the country and its people [b]. Armenian theatre companies started collaborating with European and Russian directors, leading to a fusion of styles. Festivals and international tours helped Armenian theatre gain more global recognition.

== Staff ==
Artistic Director

Since 1986, the theatre's artistic director has been Armen Khandikyan.

Directors

RA Honored Artist Hrachya Harutyunyan, RA Honored Artist Grigor Khachatryan, RA Honored Artist Robert Harutyunyan, RA Honored Artist Armen Barseghyan and RA Honored Artist Jean-Pierre Nshanyan.

Actors

The troupe includes RA National Artist Guzh Manukyan, RA Honored Artist Artur Utmazyan, RA Honored Artist Evelina Shahiryan, RA Honored Artist Robert Harutyunyan, RA Honored Artist Hrachya Harutyunyan, RA Honored Artist Gohar Igityan, RA Honored Artist Luiza Ghambaryan, and others.

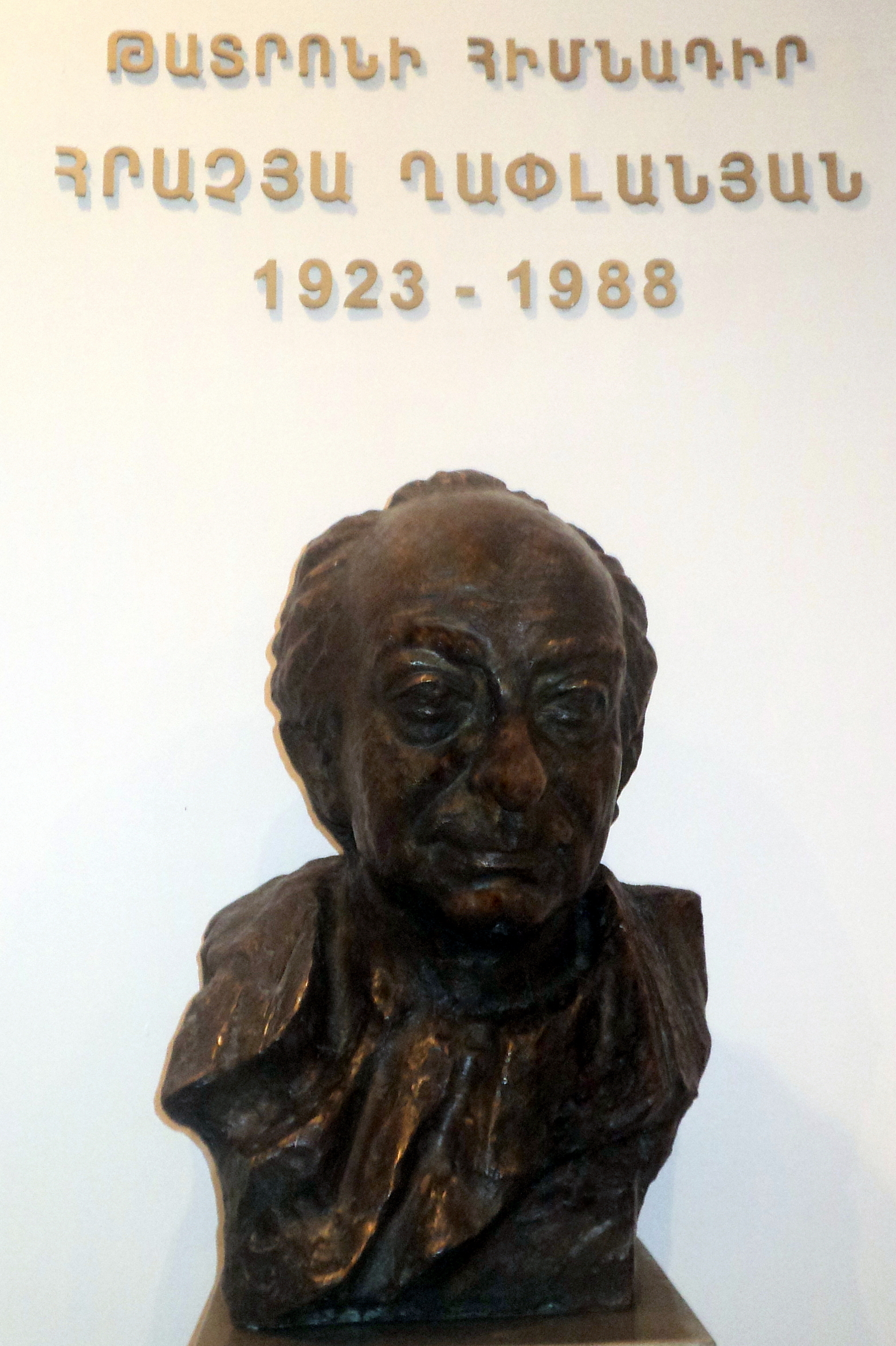
Statue of Hrachya Ghaplanyan in the theatre lobby

== The Future of Armenian Dramatic Theatre ==
The top three well-loved plays in the contemporary repertoire are Parisian Verdict, which debuted in commemoration of the 100th anniversary of the Armenian Genocide and tells the story of A.S.A.L.A.. Alongside this, The Big Silence and The Endless Return, these two plays that have been performed since the 1980s, remain important staples of the theatre's repertoire and heritage [Երեւանի Հրաչյա Ղափլանյանի անվան դրամատիկական թատրոն. (2023, January 22). Երևանի Դրամատիկական Թատրոն.4

The Hrachya Ghaplanyan Drama Theatre has played its role in the development of Armenian theatre. it has contributed to the reflection and building of the cultural identity of the nation. The theater established for preserving Armenian cultural heritage in the form of artistic innovation. With the continuous advancements of Armenian theatre, it continues to be a part of the Armenian theatrical culture.

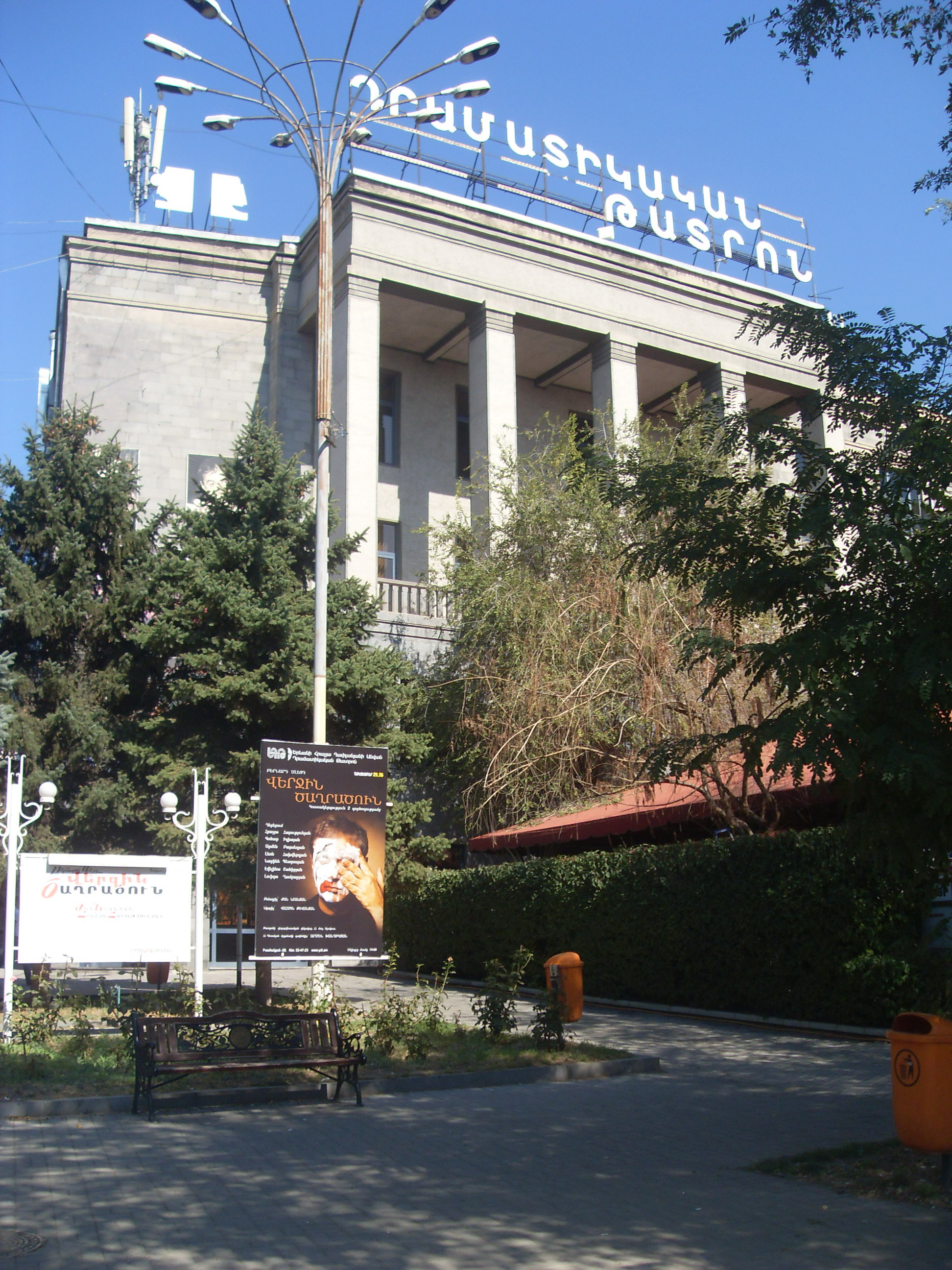

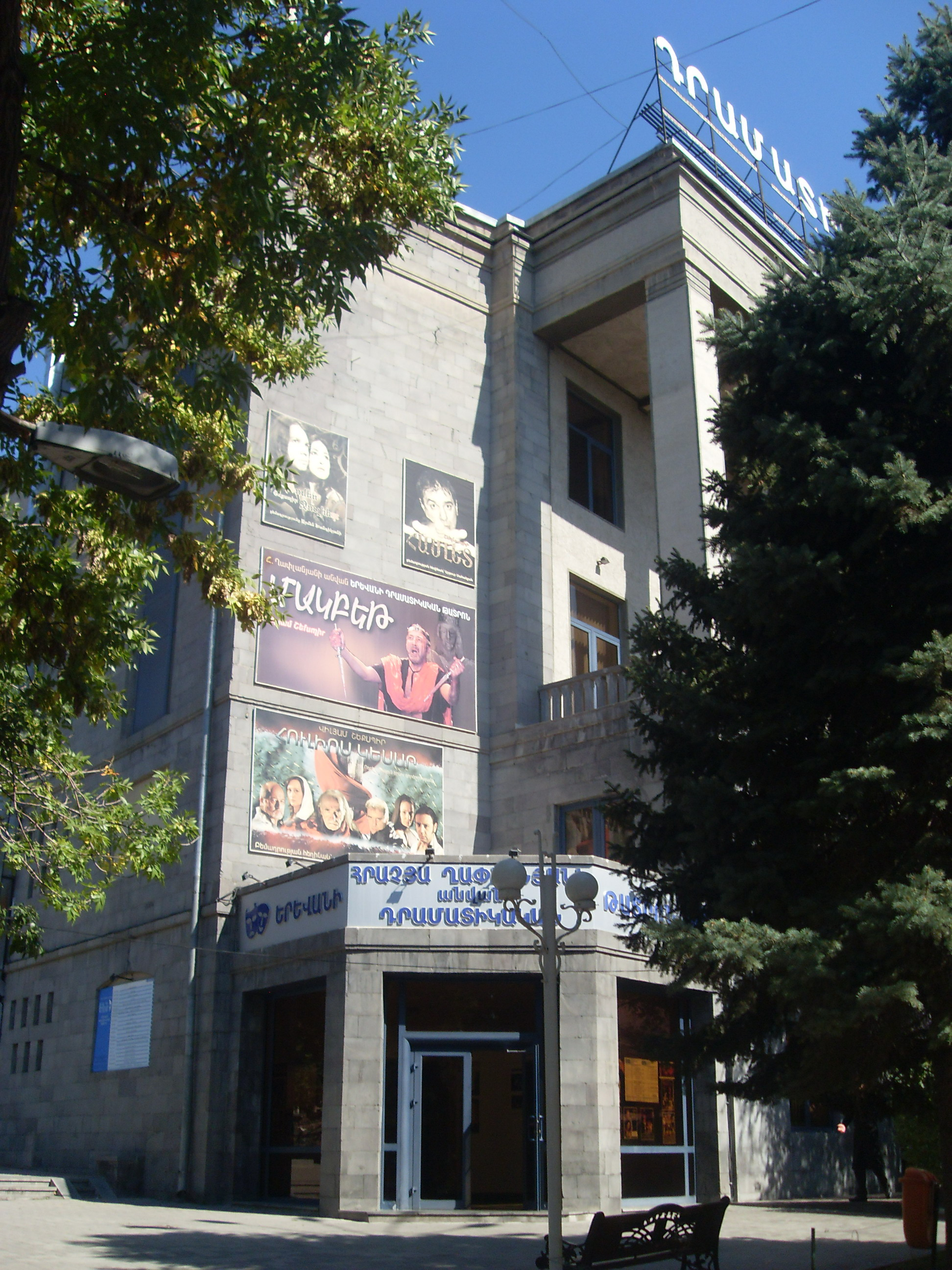

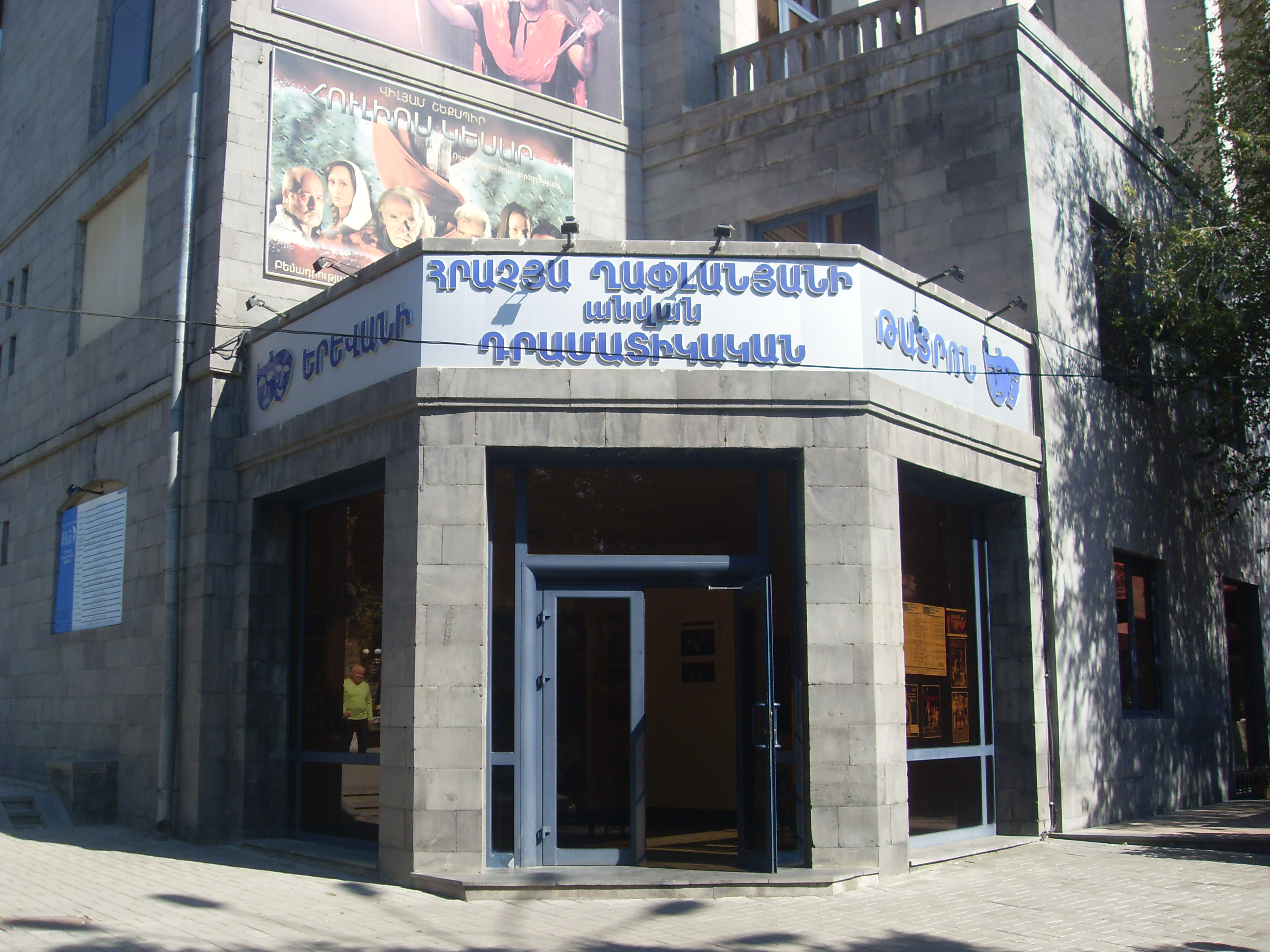

== See also ==
- Sundukyan State Academic Theatre
