= Calendar (1993 film) =

- Directed by: Atom Egoyan
- Written by: Atom Egoyan
- Produced by: Atom Egoyan; Arsinée Khanjian; Robert Lantos
- Starring: Arsinée Khanjian; Ashot Adamyan; Atom Egoyan
- Cinematography: Atom Egoyan; Norayr Kasper
- Edited by: Atom Egoyan
- Music by: Eve Egoyan; Djivan Gasparyan; Hovhanness Tarpinian; John Grimaldi
- Distributed by: Zeitgeist Films
- Release date: June 3, 1993
- Running time: 74 minutes
- Countries: Canada; Germany; Armenia
- Languages: English; Armenian

Calendar (Armenian: Օրացույց) is a 1993 drama film directed by Atom Egoyan.

== Plot ==
A photographer (Atom Egoyan) is sent to Armenia to take pictures of churches for a calendar. He slowly begins to realise that his wife (Arsinée Khanjian), an Armenian translator, is falling in love with their driver and guide, Ashot (Ashot Adamyan). They grow more and more distant from each other and finally separate. In a few parallel sequences of flashforwards, the photographer uses an escort agency to invite a number of women, all from countries culturally or racially related to Armenia, to dinner in a similar setting at his home in Toronto.

It is suggested during the last date that the ritualistic phone usage during the dinner was pre-arranged and the photographer uses the occasion to see if he feels comfortable with his date in such a domestic setting and whether she is in some way similar to his estranged wife.

== Style ==
The film is narrated by the photographer. Interactions between the photographer, his wife, and their driver were largely improvised.

=== Locations ===
The story is told almost entirely from only three locations: In Armenia, at the photographer's dining room in Toronto, and by the photographer's answering machine.

==== Armenia ====
All scenes in Armenia are strictly from the photographer's subjective viewpoint, mostly while he prepares to take pictures of the churches (including a moment where the photographer mistakes the pagan temple of Garni for a church or a bank); his wife and driver speak to him while looking directly at the camera. The photographer takes a video camera for the travelogue. Some shots in Armenia sequences are presented from the (amateurish) videos from the travelogue.

==== Dining room ====
The scenes in the dining room feature the photographer having dinner with women from the escort agency. Each date follows almost exactly the same pattern: The photographer and his date converse briefly, the photographer pours the wine, and the date excuses herself to use the telephone in the next room while the photographer listens. It is revealed on the last date that this pattern was set up prior to each date, and that this is his way of finding a woman who sounds like his wife, although his motives for doing so are left ambiguous.

==== Answering machine ====
The photographer's answering machine sits beside the Armenian calendar, which marks the passage of time throughout the movie. We learn of the state of his marriage through the messages left by his estranged wife.

== Critical reception ==
Due to its limited release, Calendar did not receive many reviews in the mainstream media. However, it received mostly positive reactions. On the review aggregator website Rotten Tomatoes, 100% of 7 critics' reviews are positive. The film was nominated for Best Achievement in Direction and Best Screenplay at the 1993 Genie Awards. Stephen Holden of The New York Times said,

If Calendar, like such earlier Egoyan films as The Adjuster and Speaking Parts, has to be pieced together backward, it is so finely constructed and beautifully acted a movie that its game of detective is quite enticing. Seamlessly edited, the film sustains a visual rhythm that is as confident as it is edgy.

Jonathan Rosenbaum of the Chicago Reader gave the film four stars out of four and opened his review saying: "In terms of craft, originality, and intelligence, there are few young filmmakers in the world today to match Atom Egoyan...".

However, not all reviews were positive. Rita Kempley of The Washington Post said, "[Egoyan's] approach remains far too cerebral to evoke more than intellectual interest".
