= The Priestess =

- Directed by: Vigen Chaldranyan
- Written by: Anahit Aghasaryan
- Produced by: Mel Metcalfe; Sahak Ekshian; Vigen Chaldranian
- Starring: Rouzan Vit Mesropyan
- Music by: Ara Gevorkian; Nathan Lanier
- Release date: 2007
- Running time: 109 minutes
- Country: Armenia
- Language: Armenian (English subtitles)

The Priestess (Armenian: Քրմուհին, Qrmuhin) is an Armenian film directed by Vigen Chaldranyan and renowned Armenian screenwriter Anahit Aghasaryan. It draws inspiration from "an anonymous woman" recorded in the mysterious Fourth Century manuscript 'The History" by Armenian historian Agathangelos.

== Plot ==
The film is set in Armenia, in present-day Yerevan, with scenes to the ancient past, circa 301 AD, a time when pagan gods and priestesses ruled the nation.

== Production ==
Armenian countryside nestled in front of a biblically famous Mount Ararat is the backdrop with performances by Mesropyan and Chaldranian. The film is in Armenian accompanied by English subtitles, runs 109 minutes in length, with original music composed by Ara Gevorgyan and Nathan Lanier.
