= If Only Everyone =

2012 film

- Film poster
- Directed by: Nataliya Belyauskene
- Written by: Michael Pogosyan; Theresa Varzhapetyan
- Starring: Michael Pogosyan; Yekaterina Chitova
- Cinematography: Ivan Barkhvart
- Release date: 27 January 2012
- Running time: 95 minutes
- Country: Armenia
- Languages: Russian; Armenian

If Only Everyone (Armenian: Եթե բոլորը) is a 2012 Armenian drama film directed by Nataliya Belyauskene. The film was selected as the Armenian entry for the Best Foreign Language Oscar at the 85th Academy Awards, but it did not make the final shortlist.

== Plot ==
Sasha, a girl from Russia, travels to Armenia to find a Nagorno-Karabakh war veteran named Gurgen. After finding him, she tells him that she would like to visit and plant a tree at the grave of her father, who died in the war serving with Gurgen. He, however, is not very interested and directs her to a village to find some of the others who served with her father during the war. Responsibility eventually gets a hold of Gurgen as he steals a car from his mechanic shop and makes the trip with the young girl. After assembling some of the members of Sasha's father's unit, Gurgen has a hard time with the process. He feels guilty for Sasha's father's death since it was his capture that led to the rescue operation which took his life. Furthermore, he doesn't know how to tell Sasha that her father's grave is actually on the other side of the front line. When they eventually reach the military post at the front, the commander in charge refuses to approve their plans.

During the night, Gurgen and Sasha make the trip across and are able to plant the tree. As the sun rises, an Azerbaijani villager sees the two and captures them with his rifle. After questioning them, he finds out the reason they are visiting the grave and breaks into tears, having lost his 10-year-old son during the war. He lets them go with the promise that they'll plant one at the grave of his son on the Armenian side. After planting the tree at the young boy's grave, they begin their trek back to town. While stopping for a restroom break, the bodyguards of the oligarch whose car Gurgen had stolen caught up with them. They beat the veterans and took the car, leaving them stranded. Sasha, who did not see the scene that took place, finds the men and tries to ask in broken Armenian "Are you alright?" Finding humor in her terrible Armenian, they all break down in hysterical laughter.

== Accusations of plagiarism ==
Controversy arose around the film as Azerbaijani writer Elchin Huseynbeyli claimed that the plot of the film contains many of the same elements as his story Sun Blinding (Azerbaijani: Gözlərimə gün düşür). The writer says he wrote it in early 2010. The story was published on 27 February 2010 in 525th gazzet, and in the June issue of "Friendship of Peoples". There was a discussion on the topic at a press conference with the Azerbaijan Writers Union. The event was attended by representatives of the Copyright Agency of Azerbaijan. Huseynbeyli also suggested Copyright Agency of Azerbaijan contact on the matter to the Committee for Movie Awards. However, Michael Poghosyan (writer of "If Only Everyone") claims that he wrote the script in early 2010 after meeting with people who lived through the war and the production followed in the spring of 2010. Additionally, Michael Poghosyan stated, "We could similarly accuse the Azerbaijanis of stealing the story of our film Longing, where the main hero crossed a border to die in his homeland."

== See also ==
- List of submissions to the 85th Academy Awards for Best Foreign Language Film
- List of Armenian submissions for the Academy Award for Best Foreign Language Film
