= Vladimir Msryan =

Armenian actor (1938–2010)

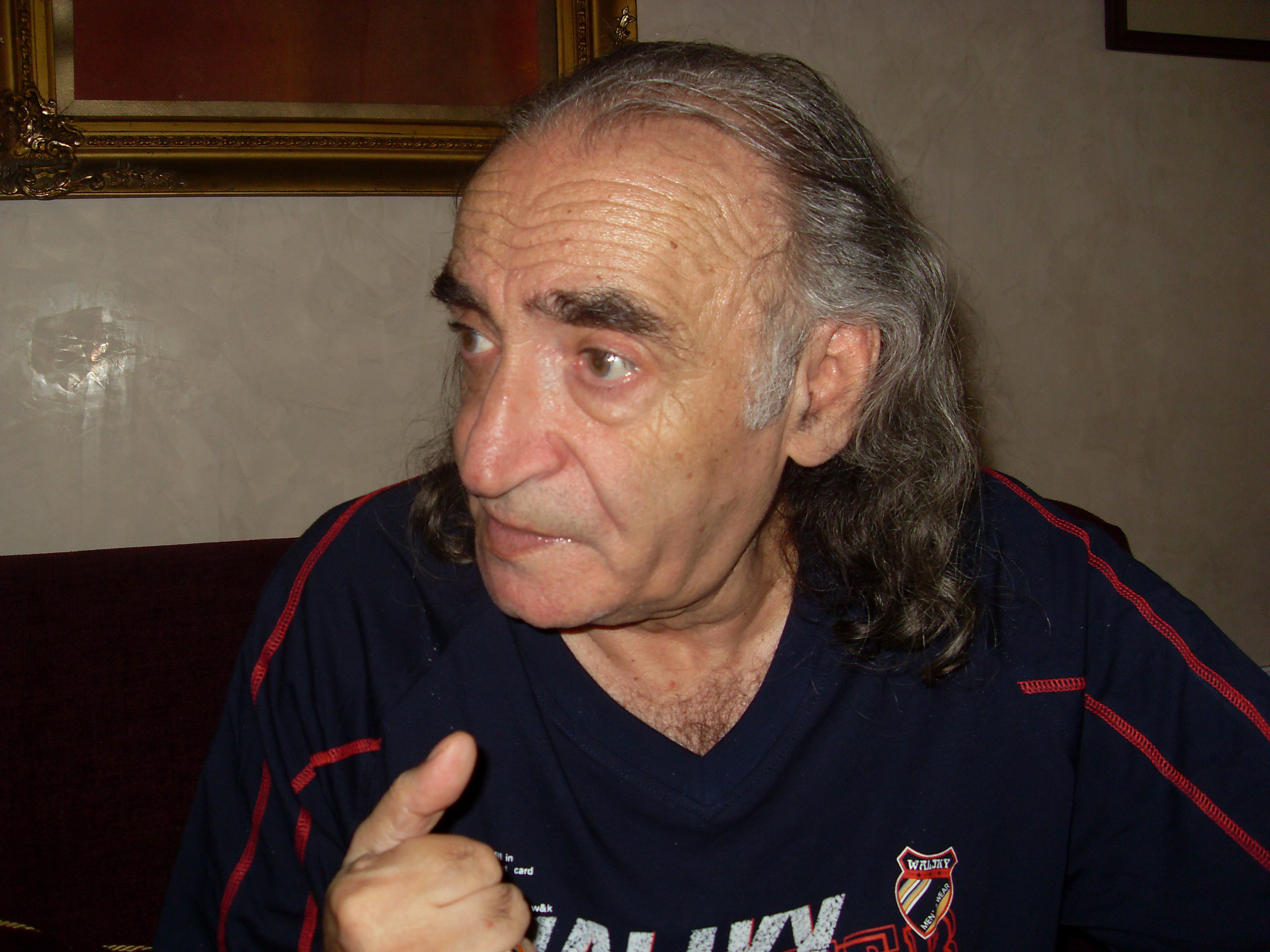
- Vladimir Msryan
- Born: Vladimir Ivanovich Msryan; 12 March 1938; Vladikavkaz, North Ossetia-Alania, Soviet Union
- Died: 24 August 2010 (aged 72); Yerevan, Armenia
- Occupation: Actor

Vladimir Ivanovich Msryan (Armenian: Վլադիմիր Իվանի Մսրյան; Russian: Владимир Иванович Мсрян; 12 March 1938 – 24 August 2010) was an Armenian stage and film actor.

Msryan was born in Vladikavkaz, North Ossetia-Alania. From 1958–62, he studied drama at the Yerevan Fine Arts and Theater Institute. He performed at the Yerevan Drama Theater from 1966 onwards. Aside from Armenian films he also appeared in such non-Armenian films as Sand-Storm, White Cloth, Empire of Pirates and Unburied Corpses. He may have garnered the most attention for his portrayal of Niccolò Paganini in the 1982 Soviet television miniseries.

He starred in Smerch which was screened in the Un Certain Regard section at the 1989 Cannes Film Festival.

== Death ==
Msryan died on August 24, 2010, in Yerevan, from the effects of leukemia. He was 72.

== Filmography ==
Year	Title	Role	Notes
1974	Odnoselchane	Vazgen	
1979	The Fortress	Dorel	
1982	Niccolo Paganini	Nicolo Paganini	3 episodes
1985	Apple Garden	Vanes	
1986	Gruz bez markirovki		
1988	Tayna zolotogo bregeta		
1988	Smerch		
1990	Wind of Oblivion		
1990	Qamin unaynutyan	Himself	
1991	Dzayn barbaro...		
1991	Belye odezhdy	Assikritov	TV series
1992	Myortvye bez pogrebeniya, ili Okhota na krys		
1993	Ancient Gods		
1994	Imperiya piratov	Boatswain Philippe	
2001	Symphony of Silence	Maestro	
2001	Herostratus	King	
2001	Pierlequin	Leonid Engibarov / Old Clown	
2001	Khent hreshtak	Sahak	
