= Louisa Nersisyan =

Armenian actress (born 1977)

- Born: Yelisaveta Nersisyan; 23 July 1977 (age 48); Yerevan, Armenian SSR, USSR
- Education: Yerevan State Institute of Theatre and Cinematography
- Occupation: Actress
- Years active: 1983–present
- Height: 170 cm (5 ft 7 in)
- Spouse: Hrant Tokhatyan
- Children: 1

Louisa Ashoti Nersisyan (Armenian: Լուիզա Աշոտի Ներսիսյան; born July 23, 1977) is an Armenian actress. She is known for her roles in Armenian comedy movies. In the United States, she is best known for her supporting role of Yeva in Tangerine (2015).

== Awards and nominations ==
Year	Award	Category	City	Result
2008	Armenian Comedy Awards	Comedy actress	Yerevan	Won
2011		Best Stylish Actress	Yerevan	Won
