= Lala Mnatsakanyan =

Armenian actress (1957–2024)

- Լալա Մնացականյան
- Born: 8 October 1957; Yerevan, Armenian SSR, USSR
- Died: 22 June 2024 (aged 66)
- Occupations: Actress; director; script writer; professor
- Years active: 1975–2024

Lala Babkeni Mnatsakanyan (Armenian: Լալա Բաբկենի Մնացականյան; 8 October 1957 – 22 June 2024) was an Armenian actress who was named an Honoured Artist of Armenia in 2006.

== Biography ==
Born in Yerevan, Armenian SSR, Lala Mnatsakanyan was the third and youngest daughter in the family. Her mother Elza Gyuleseryan was an associate professor of stage speech at Yerevan Institute of Theater and Fine Arts. Her father Babken Mnatsakanyan was a mathematician and a candidate of physico-mathematical science.

After graduating from school N78, Lala Mnatsakanyan entered the Yerevan Institute of Theater and Fine Arts. In 1978, she graduated from the Faculty of Acting, receiving a diploma with honors.

She played many diverse roles in theatre, film, and television, and performed many roles in various theatres of the country–The Yerevan Youth Experimental Theatre, The Vanadzor State Drama Theatre (named after Hovhannes Abelyan), The Sundukyan State Academic Theatre of Yerevan, The “Metro” Theatre, and The “Mher Mkrtchyan” Artistic Theatre. She was a scriptwriter and performer of 140 miniatures. She was a professor of stage speech at Yerevan State Institute of Theatre and Cinematography from 1991 until her death. Mnatsakanyan was a co-author of the first and to-date only tutorial “The Art of Teaching Stage Speech” written in Armenian.

Mnatsakanyan died on 22 June 2024, at the age of 66.

== Theatrical roles ==
=== Yerevan Institute of Theater and Fine Arts ===
1975 – Smeraldina “Servant of Two Masters” Carlo Goldoni

1976 – Augustina “Eight Women” Robert Thomas

1978 – Giza “King Arlequin” Rudolf Lothar

=== The Yerevan Youth Experimental Theatre ===
1979–1980 – Rosalia Pavlovna “The Bedbug” Vladimir Mayakovsky

1979–1980 – Mezalyapsova “The Bathhouse” Vladimir Mayakovsky

1979–1980 – Gertrude “William Tell Has Sad Eyes” Alfonso Sastre

1979 – Polly “The Threepenny Opera” Bertolt Brecht

1979–1980 – Sonya “Uncle Vanya” Anton Chekhov

1980 – Lika “Two sisters” Armen Zurabov

1984 – Vera “The bench” Alexander Gelman

=== The Vanadzor State Drama Theatre named after Hovhannes Abelyan ===
1982 – Armine “Beroyan family” Zhora Sarksyan

1982 – Anahit “Horovel” Gevorg Sarksyan

=== The Gabriel Sundukyan National Academic Theatre ===
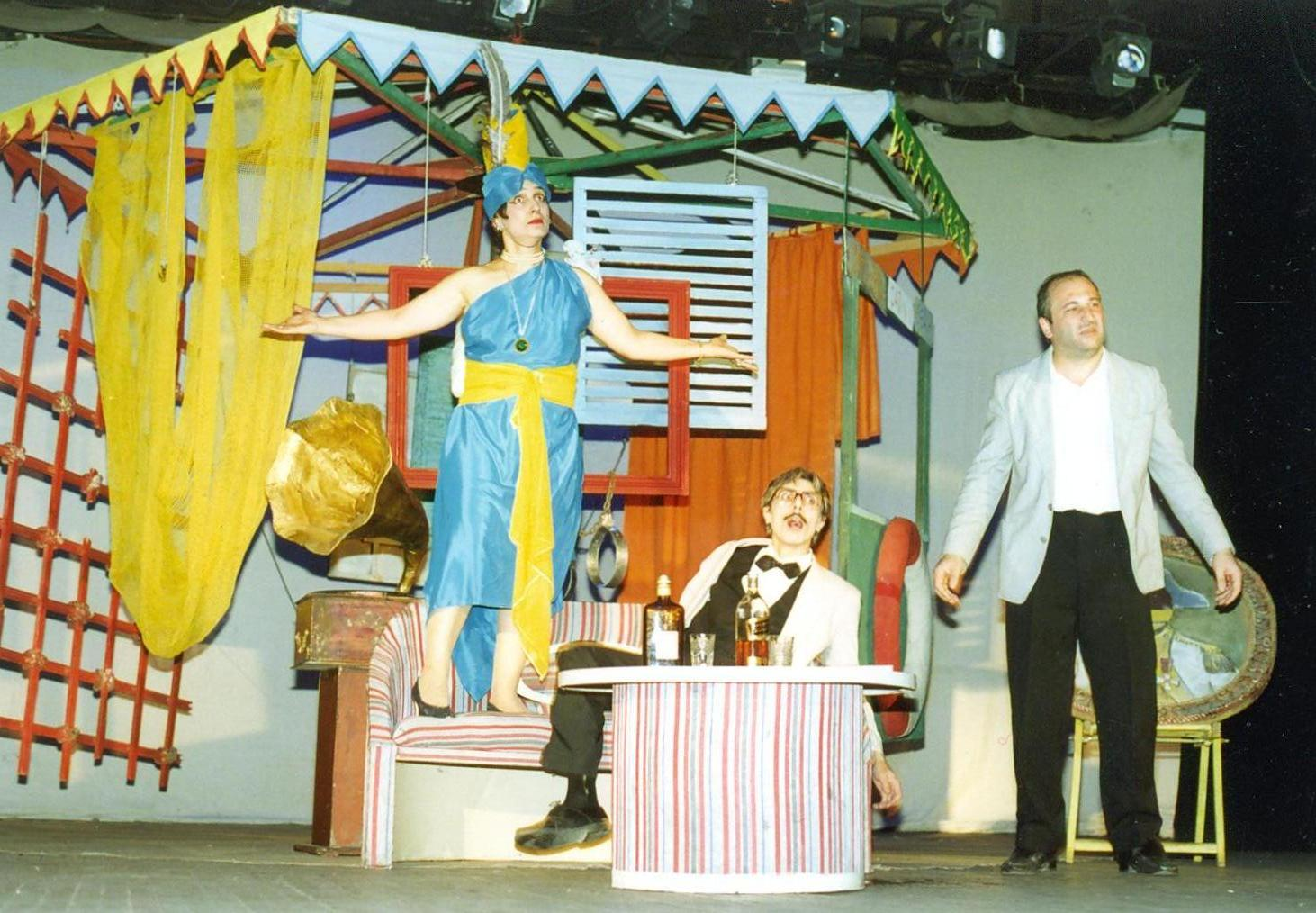
“Ungrateful men”

1983 – Marina "Finding Joy" Viktor Rozov

1983 – Princess “The Twelve months” Samuil Marshak

1986 – Presenter “Blue Horses on Red Grass” Mikhail Shatrov

1987 – Ninuccia “Christmas at the Cupiello's” Eduardo De Filippo

1989 – Lisa “Save our souls” Anahit Aghasaryan

1991 – Sorrentino “Widows’ Comforter” G. Marotta and B. Randone

=== The “Metro” Theatre ===
1995 – Eva “Ungrateful men” ("Love till death") Aldo Nicolaj

1995–1996 – Mary “Willy, Titi, Jig” Anahit Aghasaryan

=== The “Mher Mkrtchyan” Artistic Theatre ===
2004 – Graciela “Love rebuff to the man sitting in armchair” Gabriel García Márquez

2009 – Filumena “Filumena Marturano” Eduardo De Filippo

=== The Theatre of Yerevan State Institute of Theatre and Cinematography ===
2012 – Mother “The Mother” Karel Čapek

== TV performances ==
1982–1983 – Lusik “Barsegh aga and others” Hagop Baronian

1983 – Policeman “Brave Nazar” L. Miridzhanyan

1984 – Janet “In the name of land and sun” Ion Druţă

1984 – Mary “God help us” Jackson

1984 – Masha "Look, who's come!" Vladimir Arro

1984 – Varya “Anton and Others” Aleksei Kazantsev

1986 – Hasmik “Aralez” Aghasi Ayvazyan

1989 – Nargiz “Leaven” Avetis Aharonyan

1994 – Vera “The bench” Alexander Gelman

== Radio performances ==
1983 – Hasmik “Peak of courage” Lalayants

1983 – Anna “Groom from forest” Hrachya Kochar

1983 – Nene “The Memoir of A Cross-Stealer” Raffi

1984 – Gladiator “Stranger” Chalikyan

1984 – Dulcinea del Toboso “Don Quixote” Miguel de Cervantes

1986–1987 – Prince “The Prince and the Pauper” Mark Twain

1991 – Swan “The Laughing Matter” William Saroyan

== TV programs ==
1992–1997 – Comic miniatures

1992–1997 – “Voice of the Greats”

== TV movies ==
1996 – Lala “Our yard 1”

1997 – Seller at flower store “Favourite songs 1”

1998 – Café owner “Favourite songs 2”

2005 – Lala “Our yard 3”

2021 – Lala “Our yard 25 year later”

== TV series ==
2010 – Lala “Our yard”

2015-2016 – “With the Whole Family”

2016-2017 – “Golden School”

2021 – “Unfinished Road”

2022 – “Guests from the past”

== Production ==
=== Performances ===
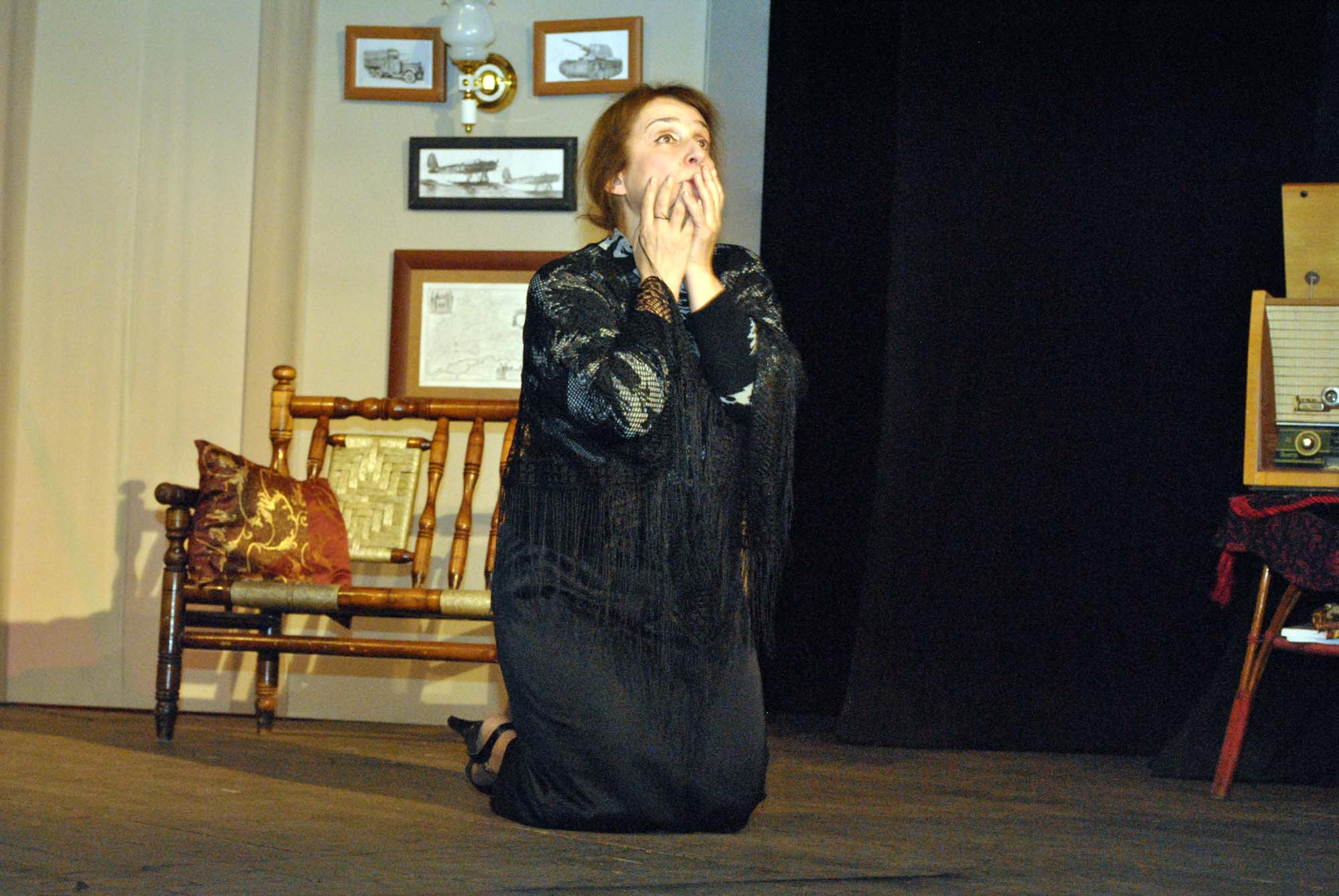
"The Mother"

2000 – “Fairy tales” Hovhannes Tumanyan

2001 – “Prometheus Bound” Aeschylus

2002 – “Musical Farce” Lala Mnatsakanyan

2007 – “Funny miniatures” Hagop Baronian

2012 – “The Mother” Karel Čapek

=== Authoress TV program ===
1997 – “You bet” Comedy program

1998–2001 – “What's new?” Comedy musical program

2002–2003 – “Lala & Harut” Comedy program

2004–2007 – “To be continued” TV serials-miniatures

=== Yeralash “Gzhuk” comedy TV show ===
2008 – “No lie, No truth”

2008 – “The Master and Margarita”

2009 – “Hidden talent”

2010 – “Football”

2011 – “The Present”

National Cinema Center of Armenia

== Prizes and awards ==
1977 – First award for the republican competition of readers

1978 – All-union competition of masters of artistic word named after Yakhontov

2004 – International festival of mono-performances “Armmono2” – award in nomination “Artistic skills” for Gabriel Garcia Marques play “Love reproof to the man sitting in armchair” or “Happy marriage like hell...”

2004 – Given an academic rank of associate professor in the specialty “dramatic art” and “cinematography”

2005 – Kyiv International festival of mono-performances “Vidlunnya” – awards in nominations “Best actress” and “Audience sympathy” for Gabriel Garcia Marques play “Love reproof to the man sitting in armchair” or “Happy marriage like hell...”

2006 – Honored Artist of Armenia

2008 – Given an academic rank of “professor” in the specialty “dramatic art” and “cinematography”

2012 – "Belaya Vezha" International Theatre festival in Brest – “Audience sympathy” for Karel Chapek play "The Mother"
