= Ashot Ghazaryan =

- Աշոտ Ղազարյան
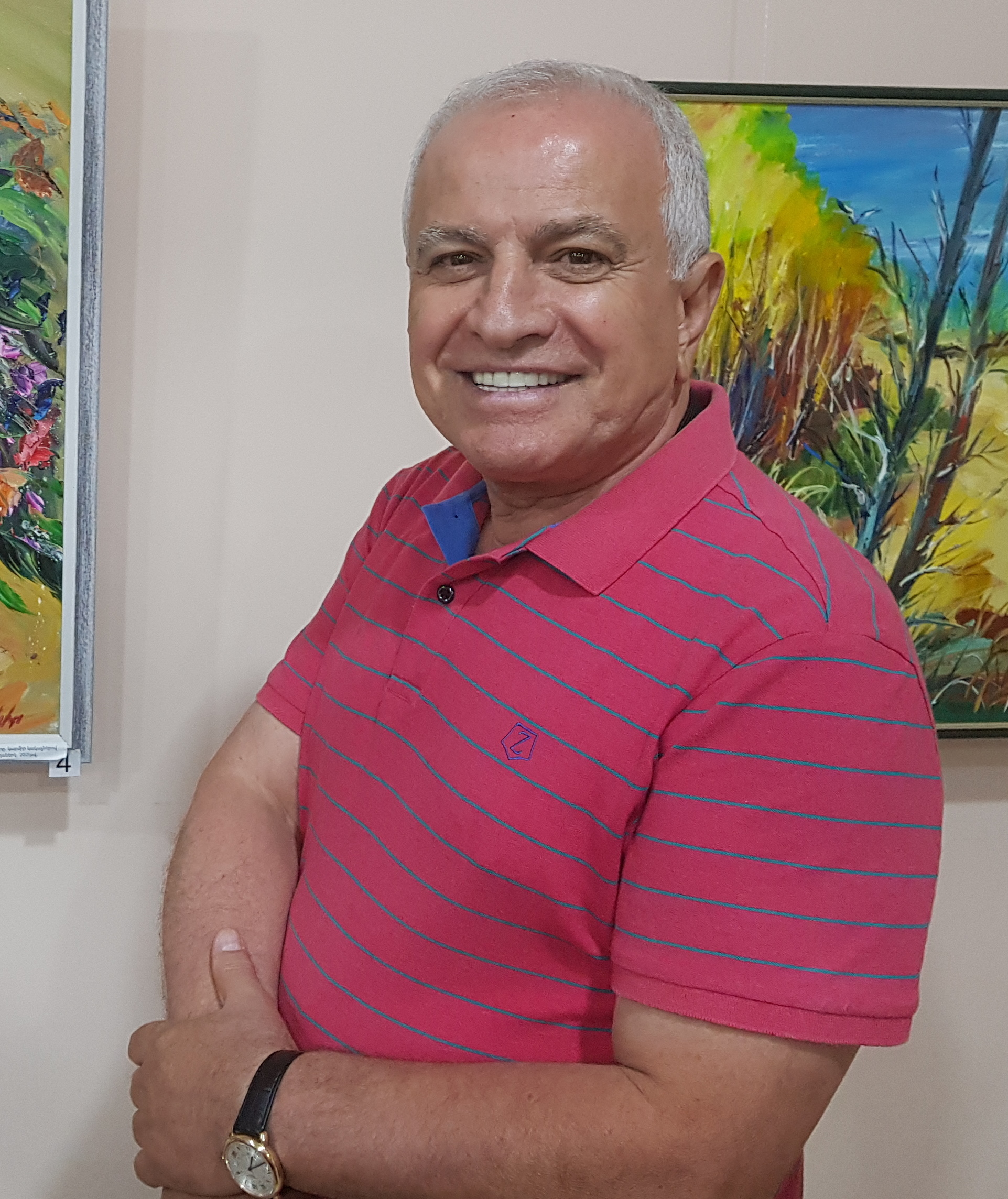
- Born: 15 May 1949 (age 77); Yerevan, Armenian SSR, Soviet Union
- Education: Yerevan Academy of Fine Arts
- Occupations: Actor, singer, showman, presenter, man of honour
- Years active: 1967–present
- Height: 166 cm (5 ft 5 in)

Ashot Ghazaryan (Armenian: Աշոտ Սուրենի Ղազարյան; born 15 May 1949), is an Armenian singer, showman, presenter and actor. He is an honored artist of Armenia since 2014.

== Early life and education ==
Ghazaryan was born on 15 May 1949 in Yerevan. He finished the secondary school named after Yeghishe Charents in 1967. From 1968 till 1973, he studied at the Yerevan Academy of Fine Arts.

== Working life ==
In 1967–1968 and 1975–1976 he worked at Hrachya Ghaplanyan Drama Theatre as an actor. From 1973 till 1974, he also worked at Sundukyan State Academic Theatre.

== Selected filmography ==
- 1969 — Shore of Youth
- 1979 — Blue Lion
- 1980 — Brave Nazar (Armenian: Քաջ նազար)
- 1987 — Illusion
- 1988 — Three of us
- 1989 — Which? (Armenian: Որ)
- 1993 — Sister from Los Angeles
- 2009 — Cinderella (Armenian: Մոխրոտիկ)
- 2016 — 3 Weeks in Yerevan
- 2019 — The Last Teacher
- 2019 — Honest Thieves

=== Humor and satire ===
- 1996 — Our Yard (Armenian: Մեր բակը)
- 1998 — Our Yard 2 (Armenian: Մեր բակը 2)
- 1998 — Ashot Ghazaryan 1
- 1999 — Ashot Ghazaryan 2
- 1999 — 50
- 1999 – Armenicum UPSA
- 1999 – Zspanak 2 (Spring 2)
- 2000 — Ashot Ghazaryan 3
- 2001 — The Best (Armenian: Լավագույնը)
- 2001 — Hello, I'm Staying (Armenian: Բարև, ես մնում եմ)
- 2001 — Ashot Ghazaryan 4
- 2002 — Watermelon
- 2002 — Benefice
- 2002 — Ashot Ghazaryan 5
- 2003 — Ashot Ghazaryan 6
- 2003 — Anniversary Evening
- 2003 — Humor and Song
- 2004 — Song of Our Days
- 2004 — Ashot Ghazaryan 7
- 2005 — Ashot Ghazaryan 8
- 2005 — Our Yard 3 (Armenian: Մեր բակը 3)
- 2006 — Ashot Ghazaryan 9
- 2007 — Evening of Humor (Armenian: Հումորի երեկո)
- 2007 — Ashot Ghazaryan 10
- 2007 — Ashotapatum
- 2008 — Ashot Ghazaryan 11
- 2021 — Our Yard: 25 Year Later (Armenian: Մեր բակը 25 տարի անց)

=== Broadcast ===
- 2007–2008 — Golden Clarnet (Armenian: Ոսկե կլառնետ)
- 2008–2009 — Saturday Evening (Armenian: Շաբաթ երեկո)
- 2010–2011 — Ashot Ghazaryan Invites You (Armenian: Աշոտ Ղազարյանի հրավիրում է)
- 2012–2013 — My Talented Family (Armenian: Իմ տաղանդավոր ընտանիքը)
- 2022–2025 — with Ashot Ghazaryan (Armenian: Աշոտ Ղազարյանի հետ)

=== Series ===
- 2010 — Our Yard (Armenian: Մեր բակը)
- 2019–2020 — Born without address (Armenian: Անհասցե ծնվածները)
- 2020–2021 — Sari Girl (Armenian: Սարի աղջիկ)
