= The Voice in the Wilderness =

1991 film

- Directed by: Vigen Chaldranyan
- Written by: Aghasi Ayvazyan
- Starring: Vigen Chaldranyan
- Release date: 1991
- Running time: 132 minutes
- Country: Soviet Union
- Language: Armenian

Voice in the Wilderness (Armenian: Ձայն բարբառոյ..., romanized: Dzayn barbaro...) is a 1991 Soviet-Armenian drama film directed by Vigen Chaldranyan. It was entered into the 18th Moscow International Film Festival.

== Cast ==
- Vigen Chaldranyan as Martiros
- Marine Ghukasyan as Colombina / Woman from East / Cornelia / Fortuneteller
- Mikael Pogosyan as Tomazo (as Mikael Poghosyan)
- Karen Dzhanibekyan as Yunus
- Ara Stepanyan as Old Armenian pilgrim
- Vladimir Msryan
- Rafael Kotanjyan
- Rudolf Gevondyan as Mustafa (as Rudolf Ghevondyan)
