= Hrant Tokhatyan =

Armenian actor, film producer and voice actor

- Born: 10 January 1958 (age 67); Yerevan, Armenian SSR, Soviet Union
- Occupation(s): Actor, Comedian, Announcer, Producer
- Years active: 1981–present
- Height: 166 cm (5 ft 5 in)
- Spouse: Irina Danielyan (divorced) Louisa Nersisyan
- Children: 3 (2 with Irina, 1 with Louisa)

Hrant Arami Tokhatyan (Armenian: Հրանտ Արամի Թոխատյան, born 10 January 1958) is an Armenian actor, comedian, announcer, and producer. Tokhatyan studied at the Yerevan State Institute of Foreign Languages from 1976 to 1981.

== Family ==
Hrant Tokhatyan was born in the family of first class motor mechanic Aram Tokhatyan and forest management engineer Yevgenia Tokhatyan. Tokhatyan has two sons from previous marriages and a daughter in his current marriage with Chamber Theater actress Louisa Nersisyan.

== Career ==
In 1976, Tokhatyan received an invitation from the Chamber Theater, where he worked for 15 years. In 1991, together with Ruben Jaghinyan and Karen Ghazaryan he founded “Sharm” Holding LLC, where he appears as a director to date. Currently, Hrant Tokhatyan is actively engaged in cinema, as well as theater performances, cooperating with a number of Armenian, Russian and foreign directors, producers, theater personalities and film studios. Tokhatyan is busy not only in his homeland, but also in the Russian Federation. Simultaneously, Tokhatyan participates in philanthropic and patriotic projects, among which are the large-scaled campaign of the charity foundation “Donate life” (at the head of the RA first lady Rita Sargsyan), annual fundraising marathon, organized by “Hayastan” All-Armenian Fund, as well as road construction works in cooperation with Hayk Marutyan and Vazgen Asatryan in the near-border village Haterk in Martakert region of Artsakh, etc. Hrant Tokhatyan is also a member of the Council of Elders of Yerevan from the Republican Party, being actively engaged in the country’s social life, and appearing as a member of the initiative aimed at the preservation of buildings and constructions in Yerevan. Establishment of a children’s theater is Tokhatyan’s primary objective.

== Awards ==
Medals and Awards that were granted to him are:

- Winner of the World Festival of Youth and Students (1985)
- Laureate of Lenin Komsomol of the first degree (1989)
- Winner of the second degree in the international theater festival Le Theatre De Monde (1989)
- Honorary Diploma of the President of the Nagorno Karabakh Republic.
- Certificate of Merit of the Minister of Defense of the Nagorno-Karabakh Republic, 2002.
- Honored Artist of Armenia (2006)
- Honorary Diploma of the Egyptian Children's Festival entertaining films of 2006.
- Medal Andranik Ozanian (Ministry of Defence of Armenia, 2008)
- Vazgen Sargsyan Medal (Ministry of Defence of Armenia, 2010)
- World Armenian Entertainment Awards Most Demanded Artist Award (2015)

== Filmography ==
Film
Year	Title	Role	Notes
1981	Avtomeqenan taniqi vra		
1996	Our Yard	Hrant	
1997	Khatabalada		
1998	Our Yard 2	Hrant	
2000-2006	Our Alphabet		
2005	Our Yard 3	Hrant	
2006	Big Story in a Small City	Grigor Janoyan	
2009	Taxi Eli Lav A		
2012	Lost & Found in Armenia	Alexan	
2013	Grandfather 005	Robert	
2014	Anahit	Serob	
2016	Everything About Men		
2016	Earthquake	Precinct	
2016	Wonderland		
2019	How I Became Russian (Chinese: 战斗民族养成记; Russian: Как я стал русским)	Ruben	
2021	Our Yard: 25 Year Later	Hrant	

Television and web
Year	Title	Role	Notes
2002	Armenian Radio (Armenian: Հայկական Ռադիո; Russian: Армянские Радио)		TV Program
2004	My Big Armenian Wedding	Aram	Mini-series
2005-2006	Armenian Version (Armenian: Հայկական Տարբերակ)		TV Program
2006-2007	100 Version (Armenian: 100 Տարբերակ)		TV Show
2007	2 Stars (Armenian: Երկու աստղ)	with Shushan Petrosyan	TV Show
2009	Our Alphabet (Armenian: Մեր այբբենարանը)		TV Series
2010	Our Yard (Armenian: Մեր բակը)	Hrant	TV Series
2015	Grandfather 005	Robert	
2017-2021	Raid	Aram Hrantovich	
2017	The Ivanovs vs. The Ivanovs	Hamlet Oganyan	
2017-2018	Little Big Shots (Armenian: Մեծ փոքրիկներ)		
2021	Small Stars (Armenian: Փոքրիկ աստղեր)	with Tamara Petrosyan	
2022	Big Small Stars (Armenian: Մեծ փոքրիկ աստղեր)	with Tamara Petrosyan	
