= Vigen Chaldranyan =

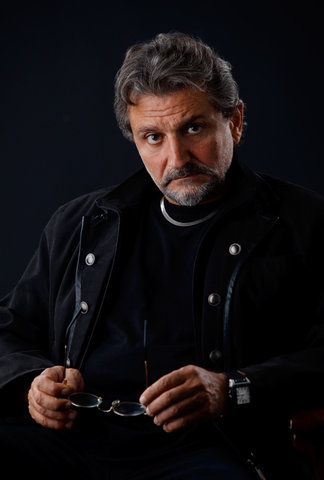
- Born: Vagharshak Chaldranyan; December 26, 1955 (age 69); Yerevan, Soviet Armenia
- Occupation(s): Film Director, Screenwriter, Editor, Actor, Art Director, and producer
- Years active: 1975-

Vigen (Vagharshak) Chaldranyan (Armenian: Վիգեն (Վաղարշակ) Հակոբի Չալդրանյան, born 26 December 1955 in Yerevan) is an Armenian Film Director, Screenwriter, Editor, Actor, Art Director, and Producer.

== Education and career ==
- 1977 - graduated from the Yerevan Fine Arts and Theatre Institute.
- 1981 - graduated from the VGIK (Yefim Dzigan's master-class).

== Career ==
- 1981-85 - worked in the theatre.
- Since 1988 - a film director at Armenfilm Studio. Starring in many films.

== Filmography ==
Year	Title	Director	Writer	Producer	Actor	Editor	Art Director
1975	A Place under the Sun				Yes		
1977	Head of Revcom				Yes		
1978	The Golden Smiles				Yes		
1979	Tales				Yes		
1981	Hotel Grandma				Yes		
1983	Anush				Yes		
1985	April				Yes		
1988	Breath				Yes		
1990	Wind of Oblivion				Yes		
1991	Dzayn barbaro...	Yes	Yes		Yes		Yes
1997	Lord Have Mercy	Yes	Yes	Yes	Yes	Yes	Yes
2001	Symphony of Silence	Yes	Yes	Yes			
2007	The Priestess	Yes	Yes	Yes	Yes		Yes
2009	Maestro	Yes	Yes	Yes	Yes		Yes
2013	The Voice of the Silence	Yes	Yes	Yes	Yes		Yes
