= Armenia TV =

- Country: Armenia
- Headquarters: Yerevan

Programming
- Picture format: 1080p (HDTV) 16:9

History
- Launched: 1997

Links
- Website: www.armeniatv.am

Availability

Terrestrial
- Digital terrestrial television: Channel 2

Armenia TV (Armenian: Արմենիա հեռուստաընկերություն, romanized: Armenia herustaënkerut'yun), is a television channel based in Armenia. In 2012, Armenia TV became the first TV channel in Armenia to launch Full HD broadcasting. By the first half of 2020, Armenia TV was the highest rated among news, fiction movies, TV series, comedy, and music shows.

== History ==
Armenia TV was founded in 1997 by Gerard Cafesjian and Bagrat Sargsyan. Broadcasting was launched on 13 January 1998 in 24-hour regime.

In 2012, followed by technical modernization, broadcasting was tested and was officially launched in 2013.

In 2016, Armenia TV released the first Armenian 4K TV show – "Ancient Kings".

In 2019, the owner of 100% shares is Artur Janibekyan – founder and general producer of Comedy Club Production and his family, the co-owner of the TV company, head of business development Robert Hovhannisyan.

In November 2019, Armenia TV announced technical modernization and plans to launch 4K format.

By 2020, Armenia TV's program list included TV shows, TV series, situation comedy shows, news shows, Armenian and international movies.

== Staff ==
Incomplete list of Armenia TV team members, involved in various TV shows, programs and movies:

- Nazeni Hovhannisyan
- Mkrtich Arzumanyan
- Hayk Marutyan
- Andranik Harutyunyan
- Rafael Yeranosyan
- David Babakhanyan
- Robert Mavisakalyan
- Hamlet Ghushchyan
- Ashot Araratyan
- Gagik Mkrtchyan
- Armen Petrosyan
- Hovhannes Azoyan
- Sos Janibekyan
- Khoren Levonyan
- Sofi Mkheyan
- Sos Janibekyan
- Diana Grigoryan
- Narine Sultanyan
- Syuzi Shahbazyan
- Vache Tovmasyan
- Tigran Gevorgyan
- Armush
- Zara Sahakyan
- Charents
- Garik Papoyan
- Aram MP3
- Vahagn Grigoryan
- Karen Babajanyan
- Hrant Tokhatyan
- Lala Mnatsakanyan
- Rafael Kotanjyan
- Artavazd Yeghoyan
- Julieta Stepanyan
- Hasmik Karapetyan
- Rafael Ghazanchyan
- Louisa Nersisyan
- Vahe Beglaryan
- Karine Burnazyan
- Luiza Ghambaryan
- Gayane Aslamazyan
- Arpi Vanyan
- Eva Khachatryan
- Ani Galstyan
- Araksya Melikyan
- Irina Danielyan
- Lernik Harutyunyan
- Stepan Ghambaryan
- Zhora Hovhannisyan
- Grigor Danielyan
- Gor Hakobyan
- Mihran Tsarukyan
- Arpi Gabrielyan
- Vahe Ghazaryan
- Erna Elizbaryan
- Sona Torosyan
- Lili Hover
- Eduard Kalantaryan
- Diana Malenko
- Artak Vardanyan
- Sima Bagdasaryan
- Lusine Tovmasyan
- Avo Khalatyan
- Satenik Hazaryan, etc.
- Sargis Bazinyan
- Davit Mardyan
- Elen Sargsyan
- Shushanna Tovmasyan
- Ani Yeranyan
- Ani Petrosyan
- Ani Kocharyan
- Ashot Ghazaryan
- Harutyun Movsisyan
- David Sargsyan
- Robert Gasparyan
- Karen Alikhanyan
- Artyom Karapetyan
- Ani Avetyan
- Emma Manukyan
- Telman Khachatryan
- Aleksandr Khachatryan
- Ira Harutyunyan
- Vruyr Harutyunyan
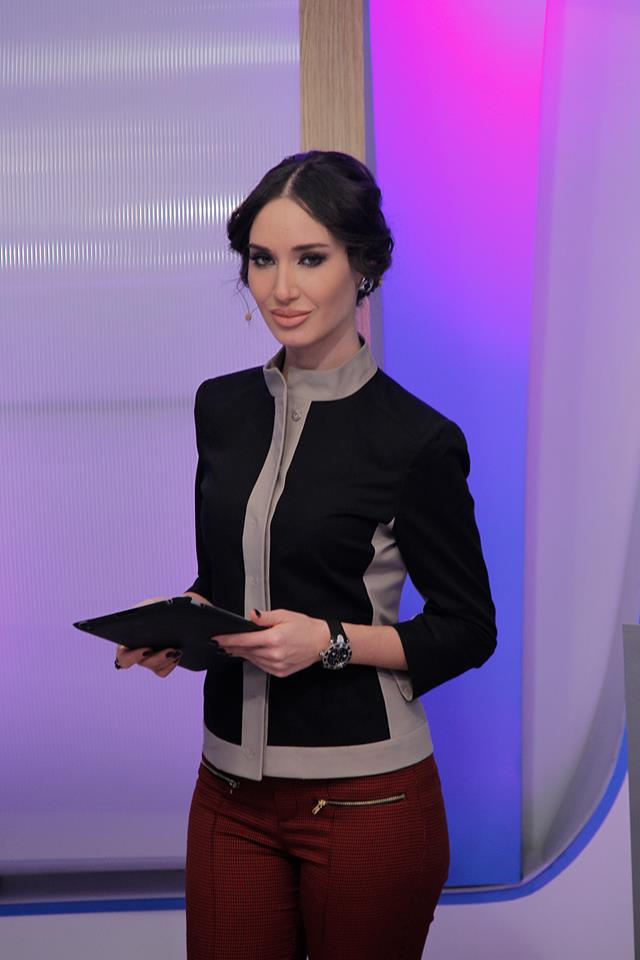
Nazeni Hovhannisyan

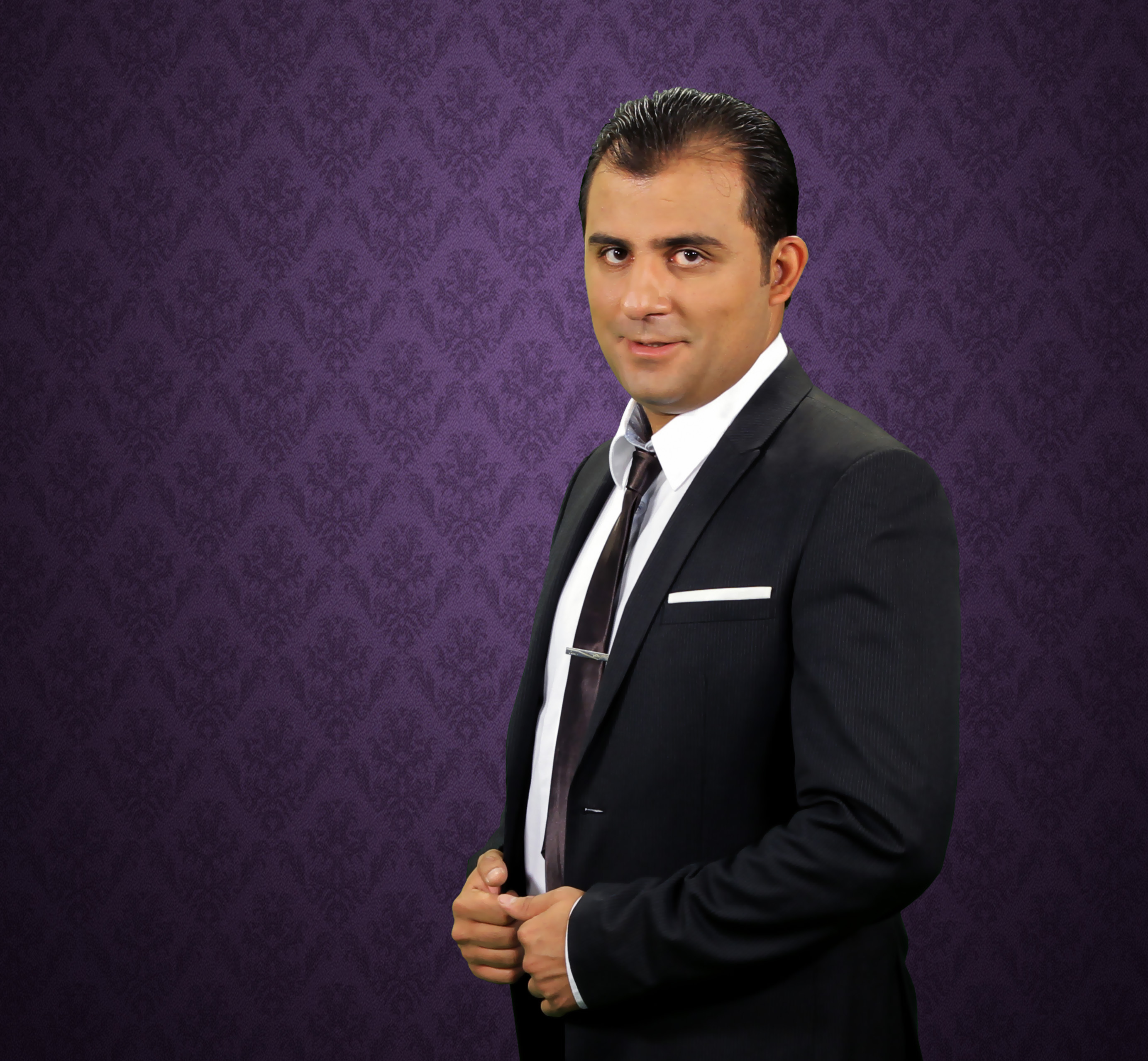
Grigor Danielyan

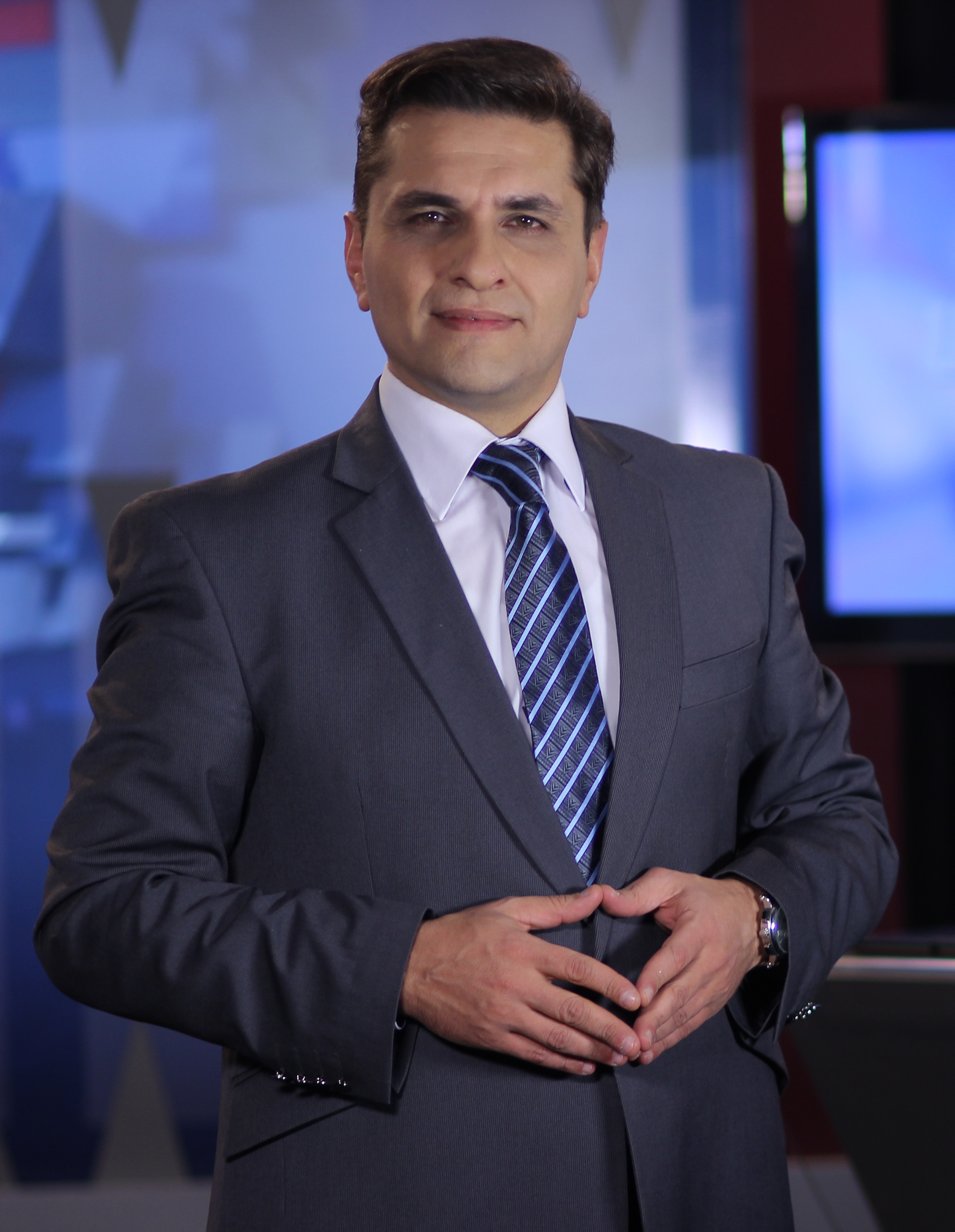
Vahe Ghazaryan

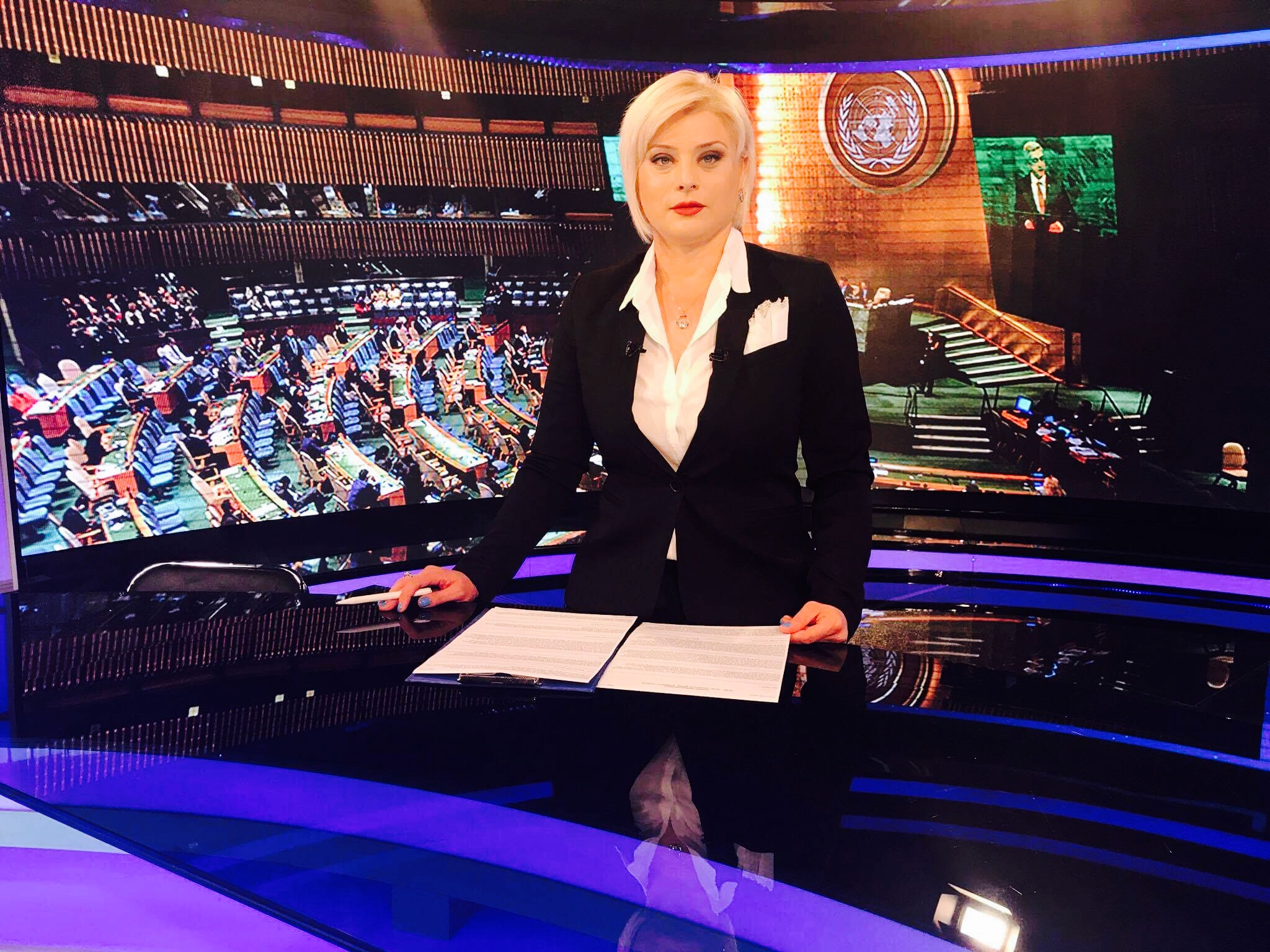
Erna Elizbaryan

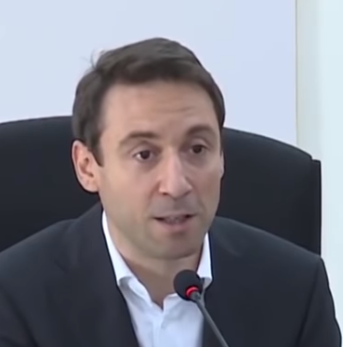
Hayk Marutyan

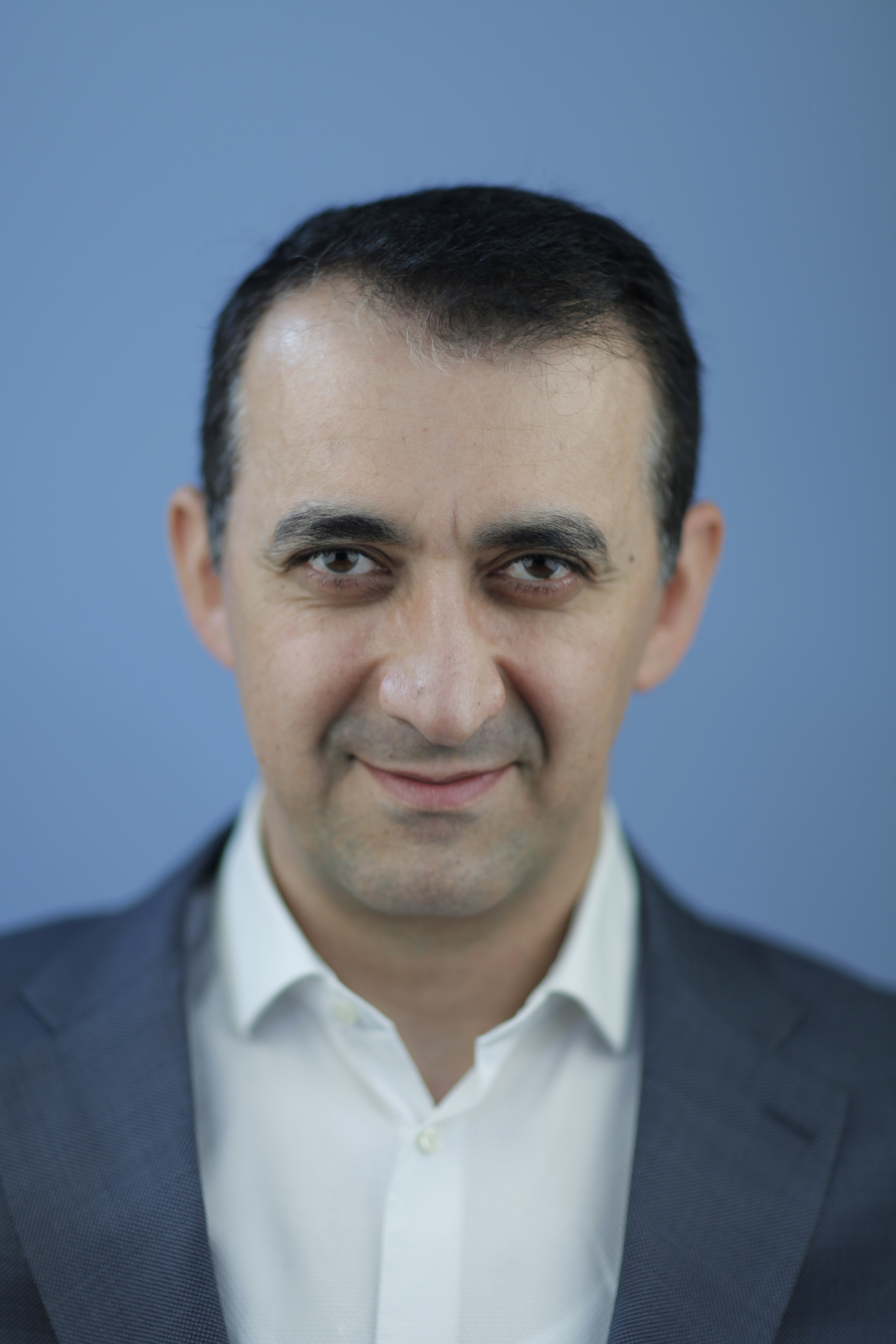
Mkrtich Arzumanyan

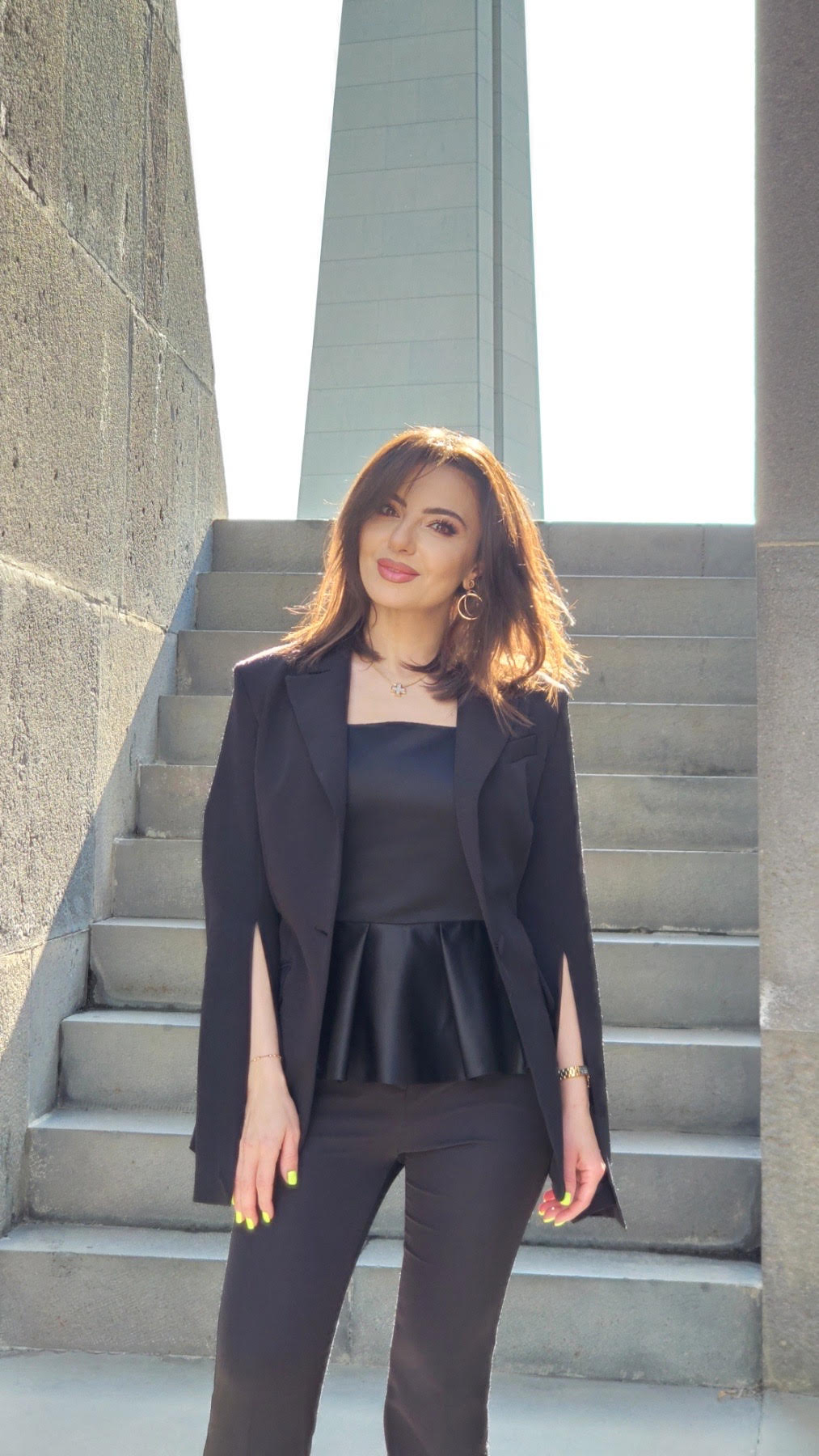
Diana Grigoryan

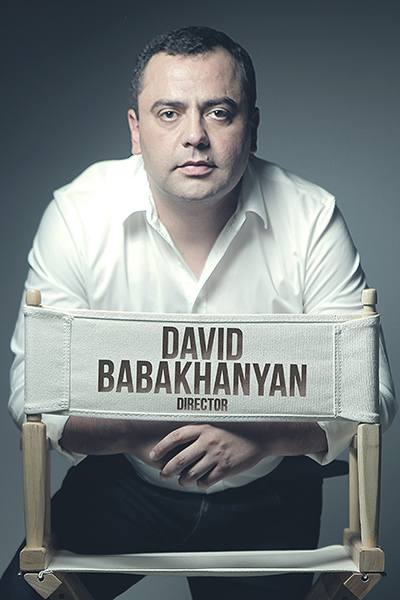
David Babakhanyan

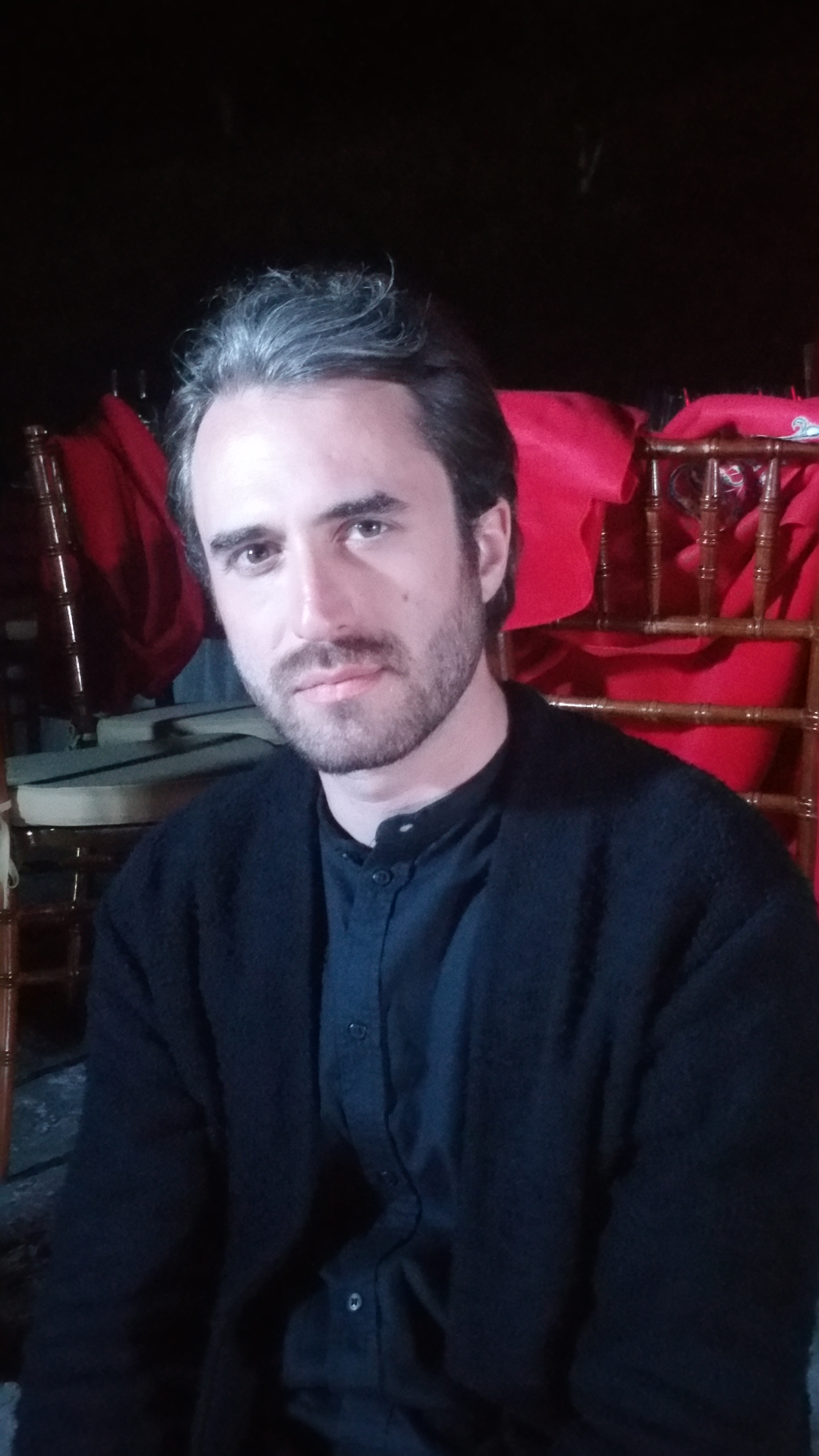
Sos Janibekyan

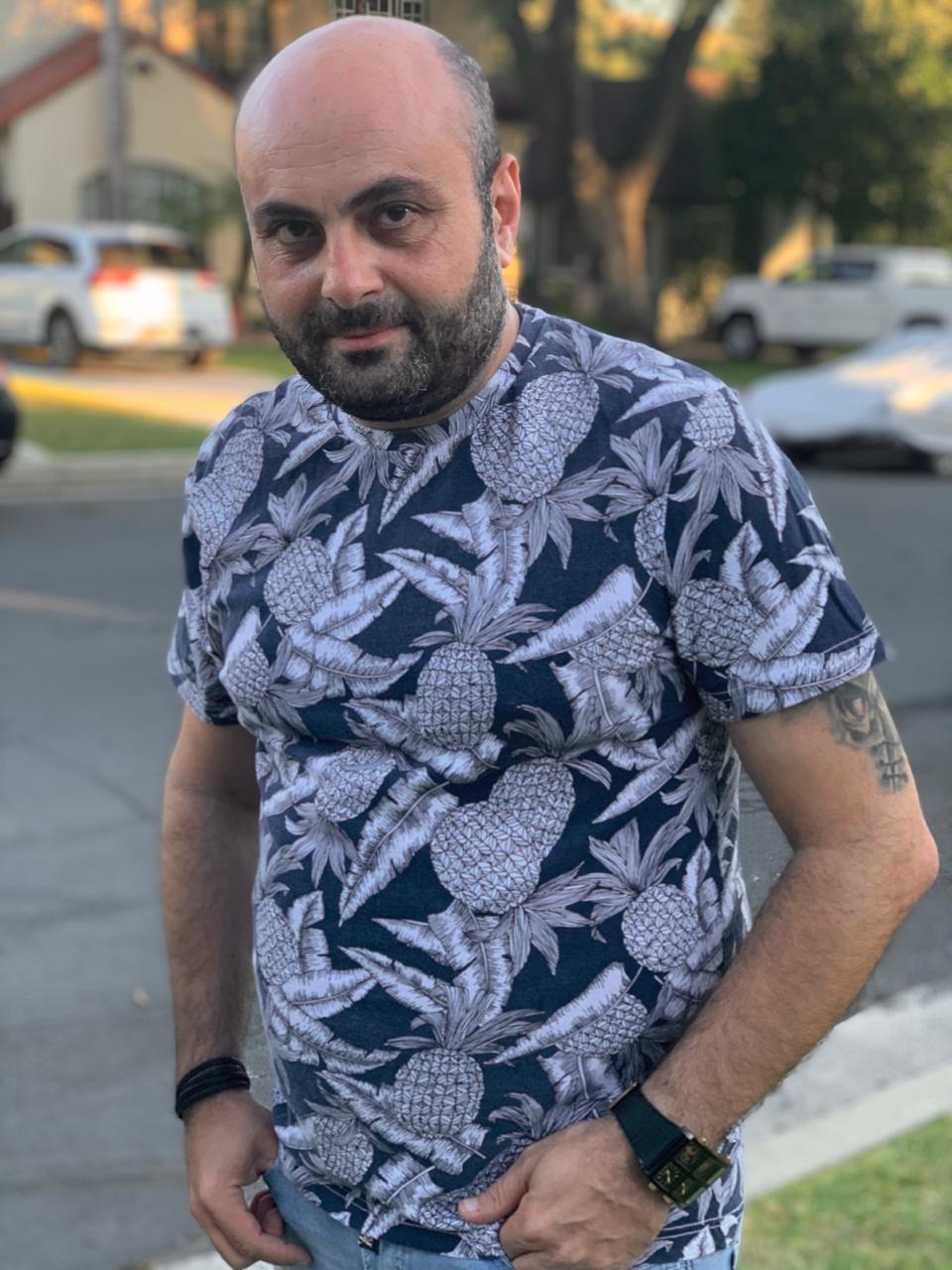
Armen Petrosyan (Mench)

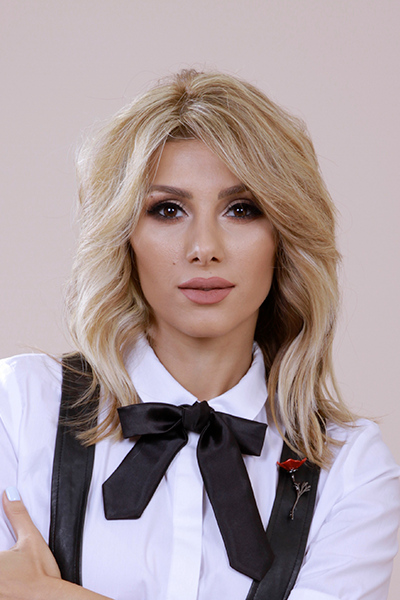
Sofi Mkheyan

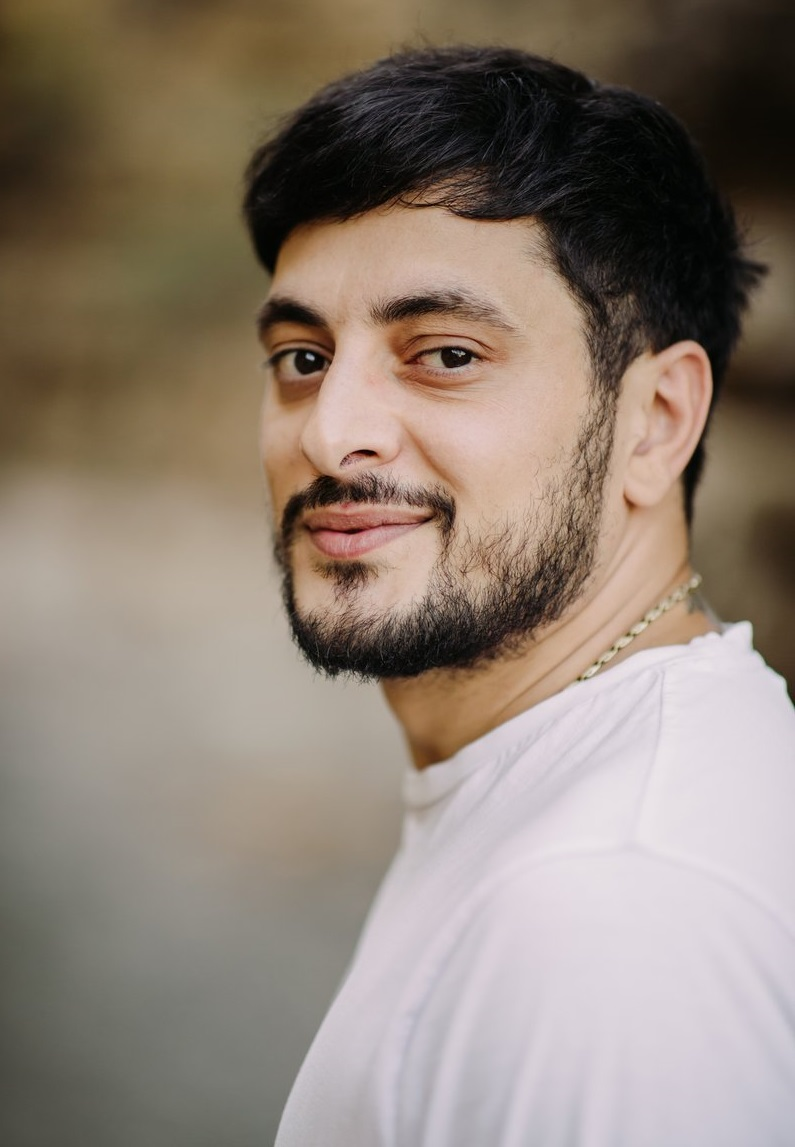
Gor Hakobyan

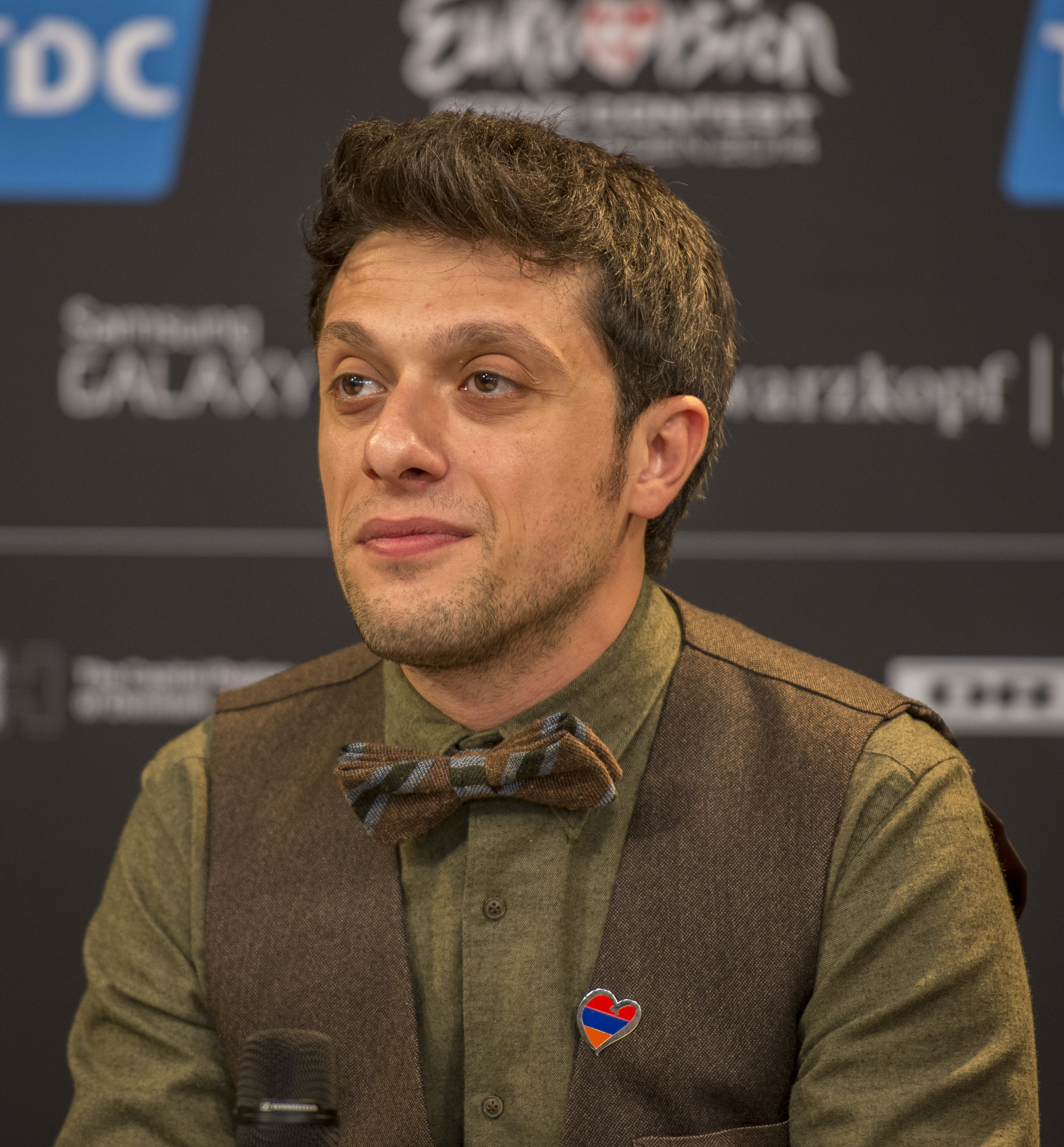
Aram MP3

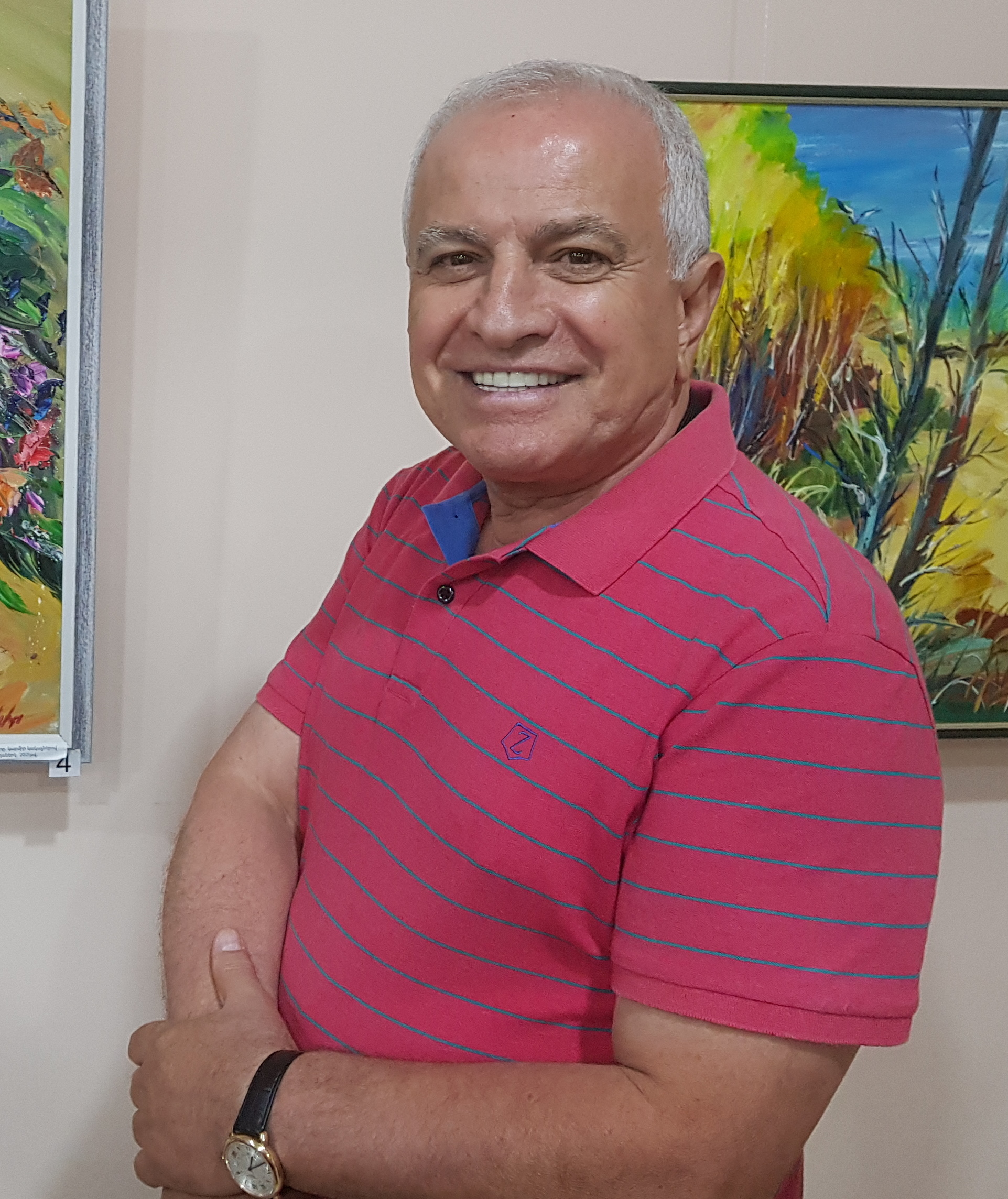
Ashot Ghazaryan

== International Projects ==
Armenia TV is the rights owner of broadcasting Champions League, UEFA Nations League, Euro 2020 and World Football Tournament Qualification games in Armenia. In June 2019, Armenia announced purchase of license for Euro 2020. International partners of Armenia TV include Walt Disney Company, Universal Studios, 20th Century Fox, Warner Brothers, Sony, Talpa, Endemol, TV Globo, etc. Armenia TV implemented the following international formats – "The Voice of Armenia", "The Brainiest", "What? Where? When?", "Deal or No Deal", "Fort Boyard", etc.

== Armenia Premium ==
On 14 September 2015, Armenia TV in cooperation with Ucom, launched 6 new cable channels, available to Ucom users. The channels did not include advertisements, TV shows were broadcast one day earlier, as well as some shows were released never included in original Armenia TV.

Image	Name	Description
	Premium	Armenia Premium channel, broadcasting exclusively produced shows, movies and sitcoms.
	Hay Kino	Armenian movies channel – from Armenian National Film Center.
	Jan TV	Armenian music channel.
	Comedy	Armenian comedy channel – including TV programs, series, sketches, performances and other shows.
	Cineman	International movies channel.
	Tuntunik	Kids channel.

== See also ==
- Television in Armenia
