= Hima kimana =

"Hima Kimana/Will know now"

Single by Mihran Tsarukyan
- Released: December 31, 2015
- Recorded: 2015
- Genre: Dance-pop; house
- Length: 4:06
- Songwriter(s): Edgar Aleksanyan; Svetlana Bosnoyan
- Producer(s): Karen Amyan

Mihran Tsarukyan singles chronology
"Anhnar e" (2015)	"Hima Kimana/Will know now" (2015)	"Ti Moya" (2016)

"Hima kimana" (Armenian: Հիմա Կիմանա, English: Will know now) is a song by Armenian singer Mihran Tsarukyan. The song was written by Svetlana Bosnoyan, with production handled by the "DUETRO" Studio. The song has created for Armenian sitcom Full House, as the end of season 3. It was released as a single on December 31, 2015, after the last episode of Full House Season 3. It has approximately 10 million views on YouTube.

Music Video
In Video clip
Ani Yeranyan
Arpi Gabrielyan
Gor Hakobyan
Grigor Danielyan
Mardjan Avetisyan
Armen Mench Petrosyan
Garik Sephkhanyan

== See also ==
- Full House (Armenian TV series)
