= Armen Petrosyan (actor) =

Armenian actor and broadcaster (born 1975)

Mench
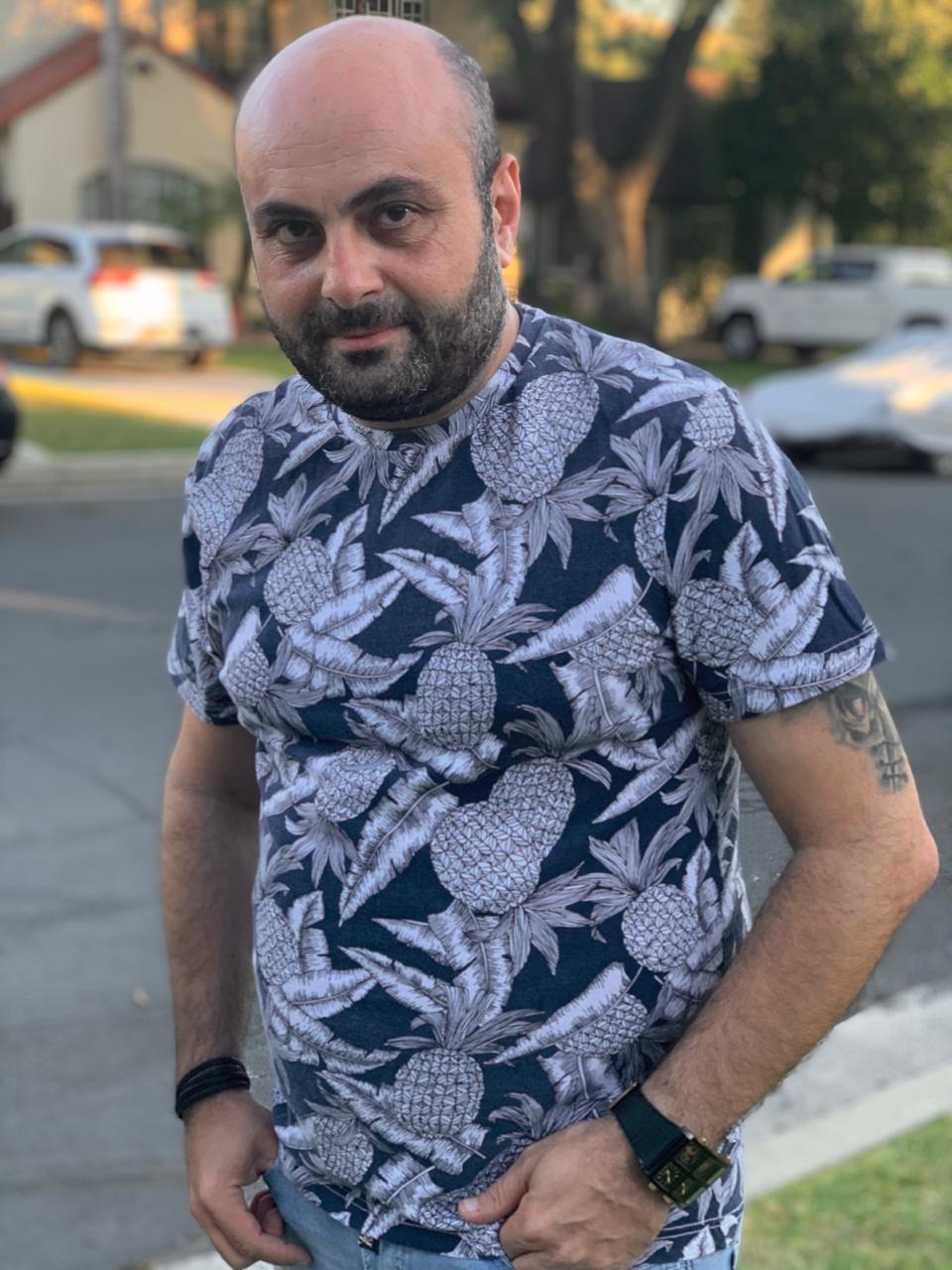
- Armen Petrosyan
- Born: Armen Petrosyan; 26 September 1975 (age 50); Yerevan, Armenian SSR, Soviet Union
- Education: Armenian State University of Economics
- Occupations: Actor, producer, broadcaster
- Years active: 1994–present
- Website: menchpetrosyan.com

Armen Ashoti Petrosyan (Armenian: Արմեն Աշոտի Պետրոսյան, born 26 September 1975), also known by his nickname Mench (Armenian: Մենչ), is an Armenian actor, producer and broadcaster. He is known for his role as Sergey on Full House. He was a broadcaster of Bluff, 7.5, Evening Cocktail, and Super Duet in 2007–2014. He was also a producer of Full House.

== Biography ==
Armen Petrosyan was born on 26 September 1975 in Yerevan. In 1998, he graduated from the Armenian State University of Economics.

== Career ==
- 2002–2005 – General producer of Hay TV
- 2003–2005 – Author and host of the program "Evening cocktail"
- 2003–2007 — "Bluff" co-author of the program and host
- 2006 – Producer of "Super Duet" music project
- 2006–2009 – Founder and actor of the humorous play "7.5"
- 2009 – Participant of the international TV show Fort Boyard
- 2014–2015 – Host-producer of the comedy show "Let's Agree"
- 2015–2018 – Producer of New Year programs of Armenia TV
- 2016–2017 – Producer of entertainment programs of Armenia TV
- 2016–2019 – Director of Radio Jan
- 2018 – Host and producer of the TV program "Mench Challenge"
- 2020 – Producer of the sitcom "Hars chka"

== Filmography ==
Television and web
Year	Title	Role	Notes
2008–2014	Yere1	Minister Vipoyan, Razmik, Laris (as a woman)	Main Cast (250+ episodes)
2014–2019	Full House	Sergey	Guest (Season 1, 9), Recurring Cast (Season 3–8)

Music Video
Year	Title	Artist
2015	Hima kimana	Mihran Tsarukyan
