= Arpi Gabrielyan =

Armenian model, presenter, singer, actress, (born 1988)

- Born: Arpine Gabrielyan; November 18, 1988 (age 37); Yerevan, Armenian SSR, Soviet Union
- Education: Yerevan State Institute of Theatre and Cinematography
- Occupations: Actress, singer, presenter, model
- Years active: 2001–present
- Height: 163 cm (5 ft 4 in)
- Spouse: Mihran Tsarukyan

Arpine Suriki "Arpi" Gabrielyan (Armenian: Արփինե Սուրիկի «Արփի» Գաբրիելյան, born on November 18, 1988), is an Armenian presenter, model, singer and actress. Her debut music video was released in 2015. She is known for her roles as Lika on Full House, Sara on Scotch & Whiskey, Zara on Super Mother.

== Personal life ==
In December 2019, Gabrielyan married singer and actor Mihran Tsarukyan, who was her playmate in Full House. In July 2020, their son Robert was born.

== Awards and nominations ==
Year	Award	Category	City	Result
2016	Pan Armenian Entertainment Awards	The Most Viewed Song (Anhnar e)	Los Angeles	Won

== Filmography ==
Film
Year	Title	Role	Notes
2015	Scotch & Whiskey	Sara	Lead Role
2015	Super Mother	Zara	Lead Role
2015	Vorogayt (Trapped)	Gayane	

Television and web
Year	Title	Role	Notes
2009–2011	Show News	Herself	With Hakob Hakobyan
2011–2014	Pop Dictionary	Herself	With Mher Baghdasaryan
2014–2019	Full House	Lika Gabrielyan	Main Cast
2015 March 6	Hungry Games	Herself	With Hrachuhi Utmazyan
2025–	Mardameky	Natalya	Main Cast

== Discography ==
=== Songs ===
- 2010 – "Sere" (Love)
- 2014 Dec – "New Year" (featuring with Full House band` Mihran Tsarukyan, Ani Yeranyan, Grigor Danielyan, Gor Hakobyan)
- 2015 – "Anhnar e" (It's impossible, featuring Mihran Tsarukyan)
- 2015 Dec – "New Year" (featuring with Full House band` Mihran Tsarukyan, Grigor Danielyan, Mardjan Avetisyan, Ani Yeranyan, Gor Hakobyan, Movses Karapetyan)

Music Video
Year	Title	Artist
2015	Hima Kimana	Mihran Tsarukyan
2016	Gna-Gna	Mihran Tsarukyan
2017	Siraharvel Em	Mihran Tsarukyan
