= Mardjan Avetisyan =

Armenian actress

Marjan Avetisyan
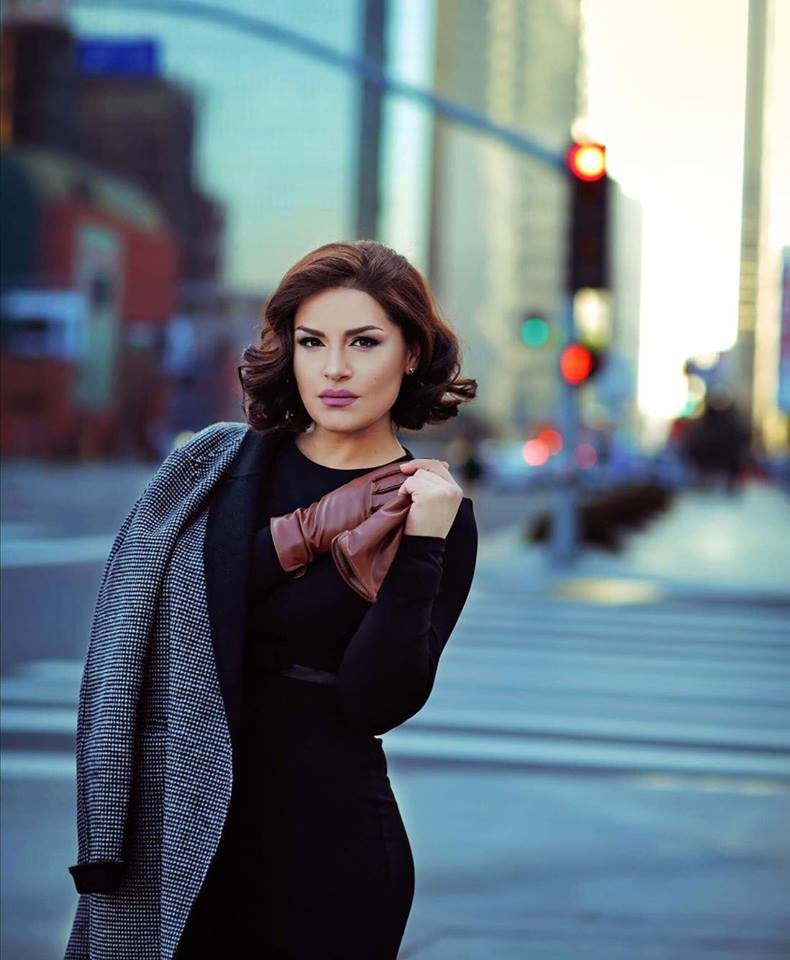
- Born: Marjan Avetisyan; July 9, 1982 (age 43); Metsamor, Armenian SSR, Soviet Union
- Occupation: Actress
- Years active: 2007–present
- Height: 168 cm (5 ft 6 in)

Marjan Avetisyan (Armenian: Մարջան Ավետիսյան, born on July 9, 1982), is an Armenian actress. She is known for her roles as Miss Tamara on Full House, Lilith on "Vorogayt" (Trapped).

== Filmography ==
Film
Year	Title	Role	Notes
2013	A Millionaire Wanted		
2015	Trap (Vorogayt)	Lilith	
2016	Earthquake	-	
2017	Yeva	-	

Television and web
Year	Title	Role	Notes
2014–2017	Full House	Miss Tamara	Main Cast
2014	Ransom (Prkagin)		Main Cast (16 episodes)

== Discography ==
=== Songs ===
- 2015 Dec — "New Year" (featuring with Full House band` Mihran Tsarukyan, Grigor Danielyan, Gor Hakobyan, Ani Yeranyan, Gor Hakobyan, Moso Karapetyan

Music Video
Year	Title	Artist
2015	You're my sunshine	Aram MP3
2015	Hima kimana (Mihran Tsarukyan song)	Mihran Tsarukyan
2015	"Mayrik"	Mihran Tsarukyan
