= Gor Hakobyan =

Armenian singer and actor (born 1988)

Gor Hakobyan Գոռ Հակոբյան
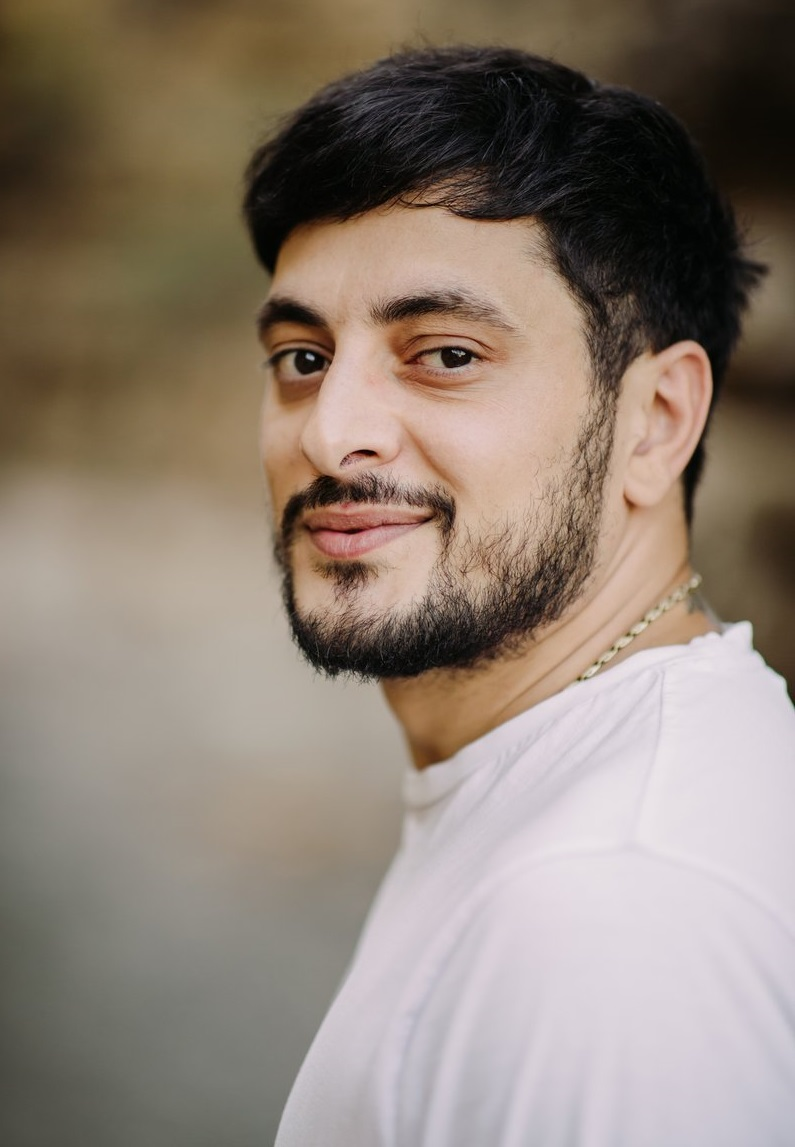

Background information
- Born: Gor Hakobyan; January 14, 1988 (age 38); Kapan, Armenian SSR, Soviet Union
- Genres: Rap, pop
- Occupations: musical artist, Armenian singer, rapper, actor, tv host
- Instrument: Voice
- Years active: 2009–present
- Label: Gor Hakobyan Music Production
- Website: instagram.com/gorhakobyanofficial

Gor Hakobyan (Armenian: Գոռ Հակոբյան; born January 14, 1988), is a musical artist, Armenian singer, rapper, actor and TV Host. His first video clip was released in 2014 (Տոնածառ ջան տոնածառ, My Christmas Tree Christmas Tree). He is known for his role as Feliks "Felo" on Full House (Armenian TV series). He was a guest of White corner on November 5, and a guest for Name that Tune on 2015 December 9. He was also a broadcaster of AntiVirus (show).

== Biography ==
Gor Hakobyan was born on January 14, 1988, in the city of Kapan. At the age of 3, in 1991, he moved to Gyumri with his family. In 2004 he graduated from 37 secondary school in Gyumri. In 2010 he graduated from the acting department of Vanadzor branch of Yerevan State Institute of Theatre and Cinematography. In 2018 he founded Gor Hakobyan Music production recording studio. He is married and has three sons.

== Filmography ==
Film
Year	Title	Role	Notes
2015	Aramma	Aram	Main Role

Television and web
Year	Title	Role	Seasons
2014–2019	Full House	Felix "Felo"	1–9
2019	Full Yere1	Felix "Felo"	1
2020–2021	No bride	Gor	1–2
2021	To the camp	Hrach	3
2022	Heght of love	Alik	1

As himself
Year	Title	Notes
2015	6th sense	Guest

== Discography ==
=== Album ===
- "Inadu"(2021)

=== Singles and songs ===
- 2013 Mar – Петрос Петросян
- 2013 Sep – "LoQsh" (featuring with Armen)
- 2013 Feb – "Hip hop" (featuring with Sencho R.L.)
- 2014 Dec – "Tonatzar jan, Tonatzar" (My Christmas Tree Christmas Tree)
- 2014 Apr – "Verjers" (Lately, featuring with HAMO B.I.G.)
- 2014 Dec – "New Year" (featuring with Full House band` Arpi Gabrielyan, Mihran Tsarukyan, Ani Yeranyan, Grigor Danielyan)
- 2014 Jun – "Selfi" (Selfie)
- 2015 Dec – "New Year" (featuring with Full House band` Mihran Tsarukyan, Grigor Danielyan, Mardjan Avetisyan, Ani Yeranyan, Arpi Gabrielyan)
- 2016 Aug – "Na e" (She is)
- 2016 Dec – "Im axchik" (My girl)
- 2017 Apr – "Sirtn im" (My heart)
- 2018 Apr – "Ush lini, nush lini"
- 2018 Jul – "Amara" (It's summer)(featuring with Christina Yeghoyan)
- 2018 Dec – "Milionic1nes"
- 2019 Jul – "Chemuchum"
- 2019 Sep – "Gisher e" (featuring with Ayser Davtyan)
- 2020 Apr – "Kneres" (Sorry)
- 2020 Aug – "Inadu" (featuring with Gevorg Martirosyan)
- 2020 Aug – "Imanam" (featuring with Narek Mets Hayq)
- 2021 Feb – "Zatsepila"
- 2021 Mar – "Hamoya" (featuring with Artyom Karapetyan)

Music video
Year	Title	Artist	YouTube views
2016	Na e (She is)	Gor Hakobyan	7,3 mln view
2017	Sirtn im (My heart)	Gor Hakobyan	1,7 mln view
2017	Sirts srtit	Gor Hakobyan	19 mln view
2018	Ush lini, nush lini	Gor Hakobyan	8.4 mln view
2018	Amara (It's summer)	Gor Hakobyan feat Christina Yeghoyan	20 mln view
2019	Chemuchum	Gor Hakobyan	763 thousand view
2020	Kneres (Sorry)	Gor Hakobyan	2.8 mln view

== See also ==
- Guess the tune-Nick Yeghibyan, Narine Dovlatyan, Gor Hakobyan -First Channel of Armenia
- Gor Hakobyan feat. Artyom Karapetyan – "Hamoya" Sounds European
