= Countdown (Armenian TV series) =

Armenian TV series

- Հետհաշվարկ
- Genre: psychological thriller; drama
- Developed by: Yelena Arshakyan
- Starring: Ani Yeranyan; Sos Janibekyan; Khoren Levonyan; Kristina Kiuyumchyan; Guj Manukyan; Samvel Sargsyan; Vahe Ziroyan; Davit Grigoryan; Gevorg Grigoryan
- Country of origin: Armenia
- Original language: Armenian
- No. of seasons: 1
- No. of episodes: 24

Production
- Production locations: Yerevan, Armenia
- Running time: 36-40 minutes
- Production company: Ucom

Original release
- Network: Armenia Premium
- Release: October 21, 2017 – January 7, 2018

Countdown is an Armenian psychological thriller, drama television series developed by Yelena Arshakyan. The series premiered on Armenia Premium on October 21, 2017. Since then, the series has been airing on Saturdays and Sundays at 21:00. The cinematographer of the series is Nelson Sargsyan. The series takes place in various places of Armenia.
