= Diana Galoyan =

Armenian economist (born 1980)

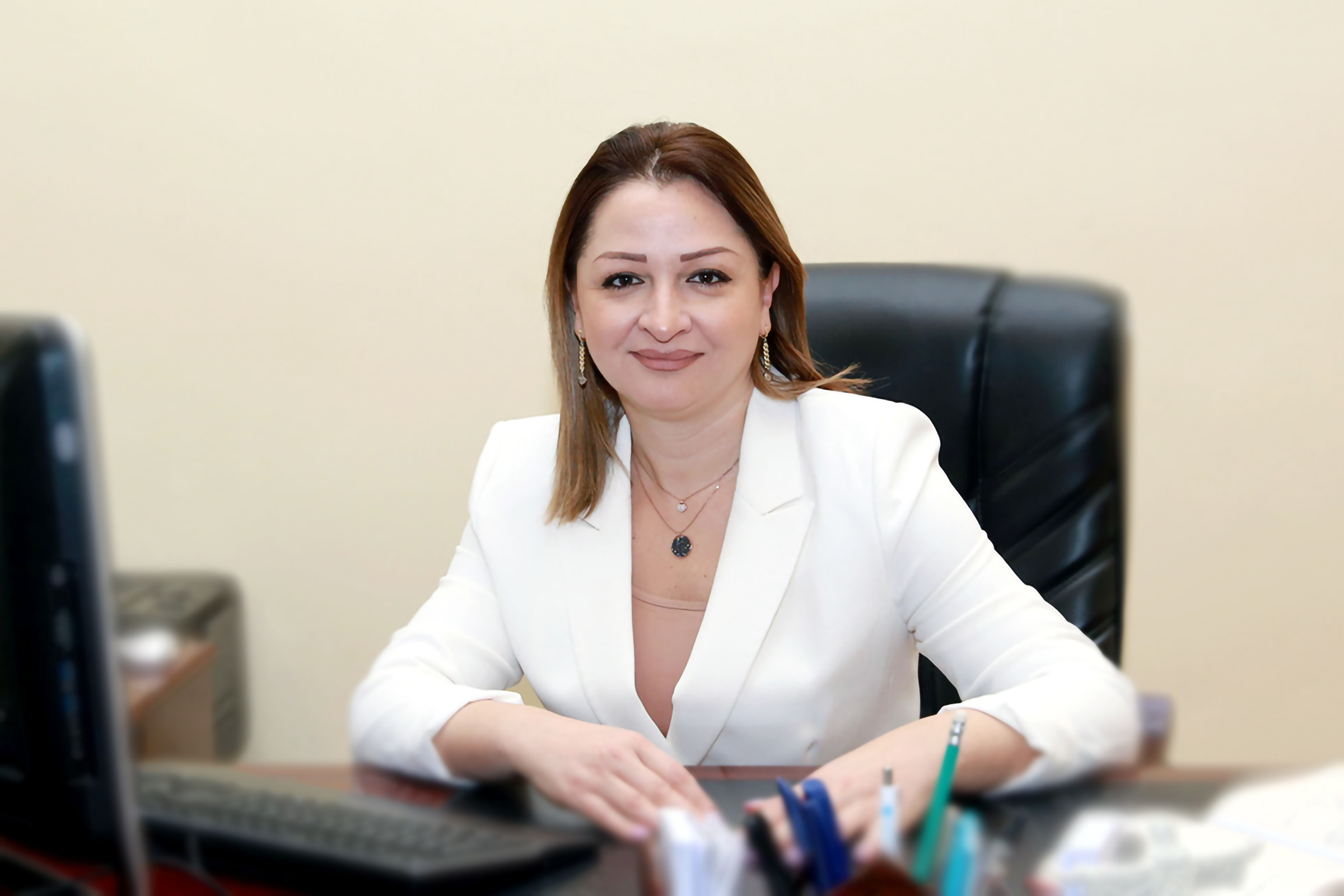
- Born: Diana Robert Galoyan; January 4, 1980 (age 46); Yerevan, Armenia
- Education: Armenian State University of Economics
- Title: Doctor of Economics, professor

Diana Robert Galoyan (Armenian: Դիանա Ռոբերտի Գալոյան; born January 4, 1980, in Yerevan), Armenian Economist, Doctor of Sciences /Economics/ Professor․

== Biography ==
=== Education ===
1996-2001: World Economics, Faculty of General Economics at Yerevan State Institute of Economics, /Diploma of Excellence/, 2002: part-time PhD study at the Armenian State University of Economics.

She has successfully defended PhD thesis in 2004 and was awarded PhD degree in economics. In 2014, she has defended doctoral dissertation and was awarded the scientific title of Doctor of Sciences /Economics/. In 2018 she was awarded the scientific title of Professor by the decree of Higher Qualification Committee of the RA. Diana Galoyan has authored about 60 scientific publications.

=== Work activity ===
Since 2005: assistant professor at the Chair of International Economic Relations and since 2006 as an associate professor.

2008-2012: senior researcher at the Institute of Economics after M. Kotanyan of the National Academy of Sciences of Armenia /part-time/. 2013-2016: lector at the Center for European Studies at Yerevan State University. 2014-2017: lector at British Business School in Armenia. 2017: head of the Chair of International Economic Relations at Armenian State University of Economics.

On May 13, 2019: vice-rector for academic affairs at Armenian State University of Economics. From August 22, 2019, to July 1, 2020: acting rector of Armenian State University of Economics. On July 17, 2020: she was elected rector in the competition announced for the vacant position of ASUE rector, and on December 22, 2020, was approved as ASUE rector by the RA Government decree.

She has participated in a number of international research programs, attended professional trainings in CIS and EU countries. She is an international expert at the Friedrrich Ebert Stiftung (FES) Regional Office for Cooperation and Peace (Austria).

Fluent in Russian and English.

== Family ==
She has one son.
