= Garik Sephkhanyan =

Armenian actor and screenwriter

- Born: Garik Sephkhanyan; August 13, 1983 (age 42)
- Occupations: Actor, scriptwriter
- Years active: 2008–present
- Spouse: Syune Hambardzumyan

Garik Sephkhanyan (Armenian: Գարիկ Սեփխանյան, born on August 13, 1983), is an Armenian actor and screenwriter. He is known for his role as barman and cafe waiter Ruben on Full House (Armenian TV series), Garik, Makich, Hayro on Yere1. He is also a screenwriter of Full House. He is married to Syune Hambardzumyan

== Filmography ==
Television and web
Year	Title	Role	Seasons
2008–2014	Yere1	Garik, Makich, Hayro	1–10
2014–2019	Full House	Ruben	1–9
2019	Full Yere1	Ruben	1
2019-2021, 2023	To the camp	Lyudvig	1-4
2021	School of stars	Aghas	1
2021	Popcorn		1
2022	Heght of love	Rafo	1
2022-2024	Surprise	Frunz	1-4
2023-2025	Bolola	Mayis Partevyan	4
2024	To the camp - Special squad	Lyudvig	
2025	Mall-napped	Vardan	
2026	Full House: Landing	Ruben	
2026	Emoji sketch show		1

Music Video
Year	Title	Artist
2015	Hima kimana (Mihran Tsarukyan song)	Mihran Tsarukyan
