= Eduard Kalantaryan =

Armenian sports commentator (born 1980)

- Born: May 25, 1980 (age 45); Tbilisi, Georgia
- Occupations: Journalist, Sports commentator
- Employer: PAMG
- Spouse: Narine Zakharyan
- Children: Natalie Kalantaryan, David Kalantaryan

Eduard Hrachi Kalantaryan (born 25 May 1980) works as a sports commentator in Public Television of Armenia.

== Biography ==
In childhood Eduard had uneasy character, but his love towards sport has been discovered since childhood. His father has had great influence on it, as he is a great fan of sport. And that was of the reasons why Eduard played tennis for 16 years. After returning from the army, he decided not to continue his career, as he didn't see any future in it. Then one of his friends made a suggestion to him, to work in the news department of Public Television.

From 2004 to 2013 he worked in Public Television as an editor-commentator in the departmend of Sport. He has commented Olympic Games, football and other competitions from different kinds of sports. Since 2013 he has been working in Armenia and ATV TV stations as a sports commentator.

In ATV, he comments the matches of La liga. In Armenia TV, he works as a sports commentator on the programs (Ժամը) and "Live football". He also comments UEFA Champions League matches in Armenia TV and Premium Armenia. From 10 June - 10 July 2016, Eduard Kalantaryan commented EURO-2016 matches in Armenian Public Television.

== Personal life ==
In 1996 he finished number 121 secondary school, situated in Yerevan. From 1997 to 2001 he studied in the Armenian State Institute of Physical Culture and received the qualification of the coach-pedagogue. In his opinion, in his relationships with his elder sister has helped him a lot, as he was the youngest in the family. In the family Eduard has been the youngest child. In 2007 he married Narine Zakharyan. He has two children, Natalie who was born on 12 August 2008, and David, who was born on 24 September 2015.
