= AntiVirus (web series) =

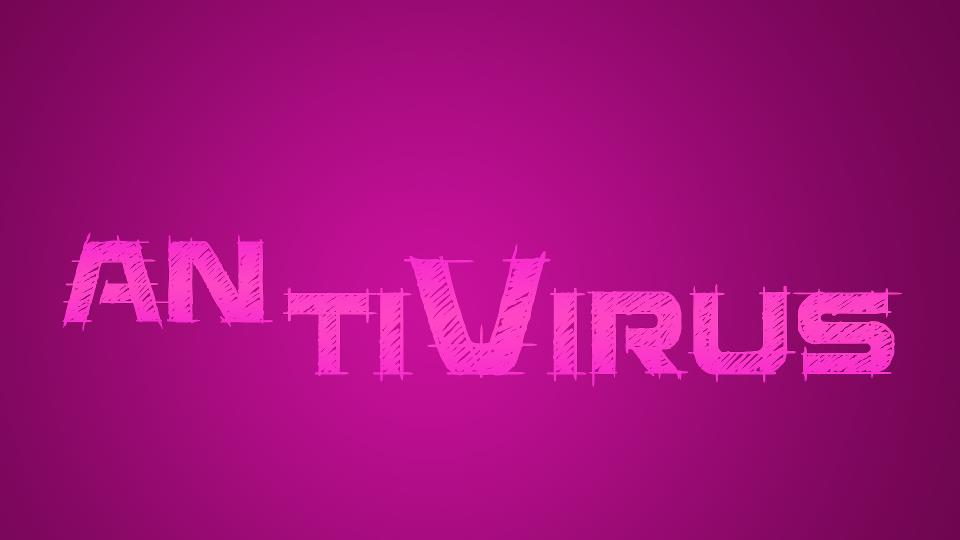
- Title card
- Genre: Comedy
- Presented by: Gor Hakobyan
- Country of origin: Armenia
- Original language: Armenian

Production
- Producer: Hayk Barseghyan
- Production locations: Gyumri, Armenia

Original release
- Network: ArmAntivirus
- Release: June 8, 2012 – June 1, 2014

antiVirus (Armenian: անտիՎիռուս) is an Armenian online show on YouTube, first aired on June 8, 2012. It is the first video blog in Armenia. It criticizes the negative phenomenons and the behavior of certain groups of the Armenian society they consider bad. Their goal is to "show the society what is the problem and how it can be solved". The show is hosted by Gor Hakobyan, directed by Hayk Barseghyan and promoted by Vahagn Tadevosyan, all three young man from Gyumri, Armenia's second largest city known for its humor.

The show has no traditional days of release. Every episode is uploaded to YouTube on random basis. It is also promoted in blognews.am and asekose.am, which are one of the most visited Armenian websites. As of December 16, 2012, their YouTube videos have a total of 1,181,790 views, unprecedented figure for a show in Armenia, a country of 3 million.

Soon this show aired on Kentron TV.

== Episodes ==
=== 2012 episodes ===
#	Episode	Date
1	Armenian Serials	Jun 8, 2012
2	Behind The Scenes	Jul 13, 2012
3	Social Networks	Jun 13, 2012
4	Police	Jun 16, 2012
5	Drivers	Jun 19, 2012
6	The Gays	Jun 22, 2012
7	Superstition	Jun 26, 2012
8	Sects	Jun 28, 2012
9	Disgusting Girls	Jul 2, 2012
10	Bad Comment Crasher	Jul 5, 2012
11	News	Jul 9, 2012
12	Social Networks (Part 2)	Sep 17, 2012
13	Bad Doctors	Jul 14, 2012
14	Disgusting Boys	Jul 21, 2012
15	"Red Apple"	Jul 31, 2012
16	Armenia Or Yerevan	Aug 9, 2012
17	Bad Parents, Children	Aug 15, 2012
18	Educational System	Sep 16, 2012
19	Bad Husband	Sep 23, 2012
20	Elections	Sep 27, 2012
21	The Fanats	Sep 30, 2012
22	Young People	Oct 7, 2012
23	Human's Bad Lines	Oct 14, 2012
24	TV Products	Oct 18, 2012
25	Ecology	Oct 20, 2012
26	2012	Oct 27, 2012
27	Xeramil Safarov	Nov 4, 2012
28	Banks	Nov 17, 2012
29	Lgc Weddings	Nov 25, 2012
30	Casino	Dec 2, 2012
31	Police (Part 2)	Dec 9, 2012
32	"Dark Ages"	Dec 16, 2012
33	New Year	Dec 27, 2012

=== 2013 episodes ===
#	Episode	Date
34	Ursula ?...?	Jan 6, 2013
35	Village	Jan 13, 2013
36	Bad Comment Crasher II	Jan 20, 2013
37	Army	Jan 27, 2013
38	Last Chance	Feb 3, 2013
39	Students	Feb 10, 2013
40	Armenian Rap	Feb 17, 2013
41	Stars	Mar 2, 2013
42	Hard life	Mar 3, 2013
43	8 March	Mar 10, 2013
44	Burial Procedure	Mar 17, 2013
45	Freedom	Mar 24, 2013

== Songs ==
- GOR feat Sencho R.L.-Hip hop
- GOR - "antiBiotik pro"
- GOR - tonatsar jan tonatsar
- HAMO B.I.G. feat GOR - "verjers"
- GOR - Selfie
