= Diana Grigoryan =

Armenian screenwriter and TV personality (born 1982)

Diana Grigorian
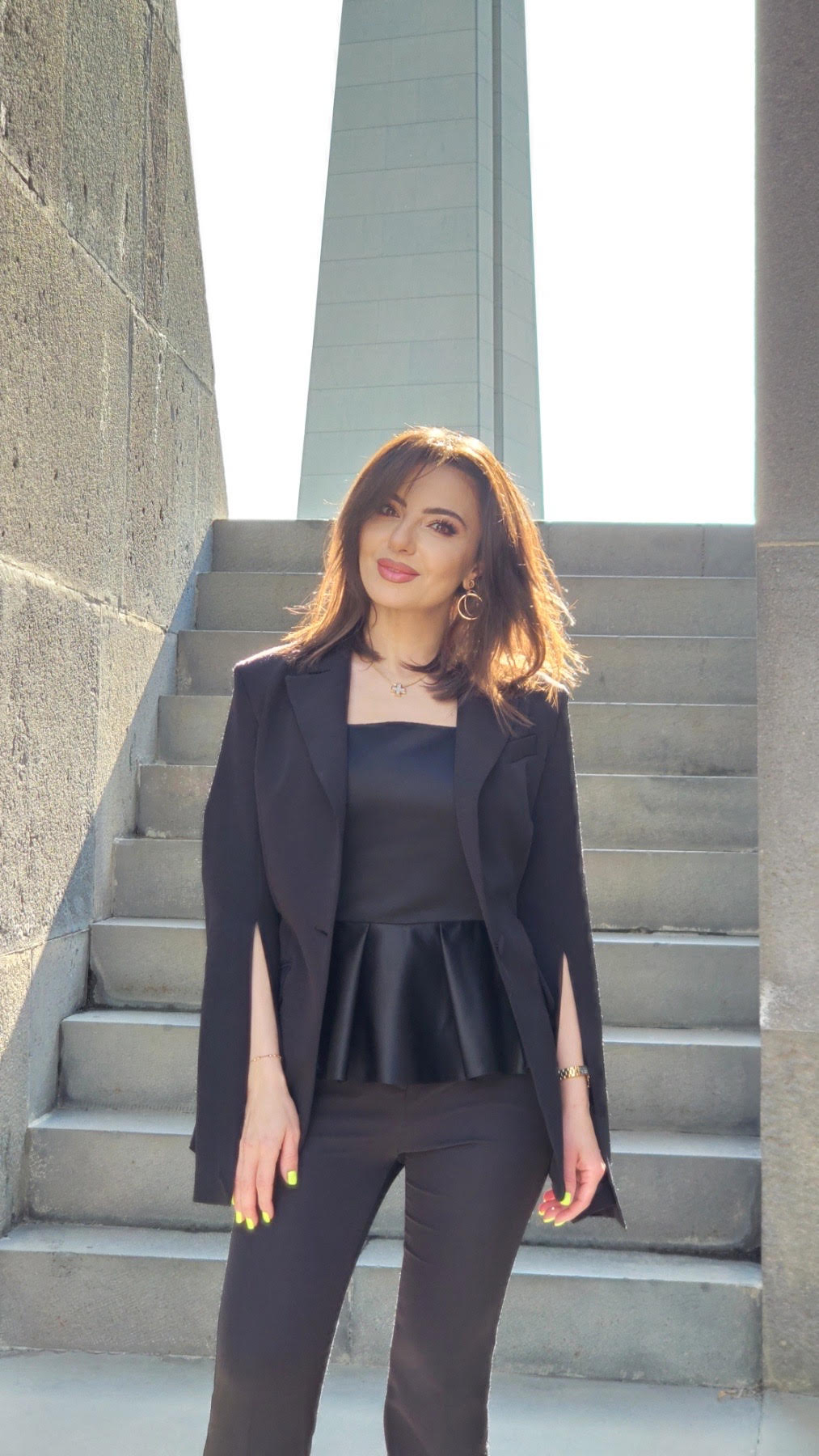
- Born: April 11, 1982 (age 44)
- Occupations: Producer, story writer, actress, TV host
- Years active: 1999 – current

Diana Gori Grigoryan (Armenian: Դիանա Գոռի Գրիգորյան; born April 11, 1982) is an Armenian producer, story writer, actress, and TV host at Armenia TV.

== Biography ==
Diana Grigoryan was born in 1982. She graduated from Yerevan State School No. 82 in 1998. Same year she entered Hrachya Acharyan State University, graduating it in 2003, receiving Bachelor of Jurisprudence.

Since 1999 Diana Grigoryan joined Armenia TV as author and host of "Bumerang" show. In 2004, she launched "My Big fat Armenian Wedding" show aired up to 2007, becoming one of the most discussed and rated shows on Armenian television.

Since 2007, Diana Grigoryan started her career as screenwriter of TV series, broadcast on Armenia TV.

Diana Grigoryan is married to Arsen Sarkisian and has 2 children, Alla and Sharels.

Grigoryan is often publicly criticized and ridiculed for the quality of her soap operas on TV. Shows based on her script, among others, often feature scenes of murder, assault, profanity and misogyny with "no artistic value whatsoever".

== Filmography ==
"The Prisoners of Fate" (Armenian: "Ճակատագրի գերիները") 2007–2008 Armenia TV, 28 episodes

"The Swollen Madmen" (Armenian: "Շփացած Խելագարները") 2009 Armenia TV, 60 episodes

"Masquerade" (Armenian: "Դիմակահանդես" ) 2009–2010 Armenia TV, 250 episodes

"Hard Life" (Armenian: "Դժվար Ապրուստ") 2011–2013 Armenia TV, 510 episodes

"Relative enemy" (Armenian: "Հարազատ Թշնամի") 2013–2015 Armenia TV, 503 episodes

"The leaders" (Armenian: "Առաջնորդները") 2015–2017 Armenia TV, 434 episodes

"Pomegranate Seed" (Armenian: "Նռան Հատիկ") 2017–2019 Armenia TV, 380 episodes

"A Found Dream" (Armenian: "Գտնված երազ") 2019 Armenia TV

"Born without address" (Armenian: "Անհասցե ծնվածները") 2019–2020 Armenia TV, 283 episodes

"Mountain Girl" (Armenian: "Սարի Աղջիկ") 2020-2021 Armenia TV, 125 episodes

"Swear" (Armenian: "Երդում") 2021-2022 Armenia TV, still playing 215 episodes

"Blind World" (Armenian: "Կույր Աշխարհ") 2022-2023 Armenia TV, still playing 210 episodes

"Cinderella's Dreams" (Armenian: "Մոխրոտի Երազները") 2023-2024 Armenia TV, still playing 322 episodes

"The Last Bell" (Armenian: "Վերջին զանգ") 2025 Armenia TV, still playing 253 episodes

"Survive battle" (Armenian: "Գոյամարտ") 2026 Armenia TV, from January 26

== TV shows ==
Author and Host of "Boomerang" (Armenian: "Բումերանգ") Musical and Entertainment TV Show, 1999–2003 Armenia TV

Author and Host of "My Big fat Armenian Wedding" (Armenian: "Իմ մեծ, չաղ, հայկական հարսանիքը") Cultural entertainment TV Show, 2004–2008 Armenia TV

Author and Host of "Out of the Braces" (Armenian: "Փակագծերից դուրս") Talk Show, 2013 Armenia TV

Author and Host of "Eyes of the Armenian" (Armenian: "Հայի աչքեր") charitable TV Show, 2015 Armenia TV

Author and Host of "Know more" (Armenian: "Իմացի՛ր ավելին") TV Show, 2019–present Armenia TV
