= Full House (Armenian TV series) =

Armenian television sitcom

- Ֆուլ Հաուս
- Genre: Sitcom; Romance
- Developed by: Armen Petrosyan
- Starring: Mihran Tsarukyan; Arpi Gabrielyan; Gor Hakobyan; Ani Yeranyan; Grigor Danielyan
- Composer: Duetro Studio
- Country of origin: Armenia
- Original language: Armenian
- No. of seasons: 9
- No. of episodes: 231

Production
- Producer: Armen Petrosyan
- Production locations: Yerevan, Armenia
- Running time: 25–36 minutes
- Production company: Armenia TV Company

Original release
- Network: Armenia TV
- Release: 4 October 2014 – 5 June 2019

Related
- Domino (Armenian TV series)

Full House (Armenian: Ֆուլ Հաուս) is an Armenian television sitcom. Developed by Armen Petrosyan, it premiered on Armenia TV on 4 October 2014, and ended 5 June 2019. There was a movie that came out on January 29, 2026, which lasts one hour and thirty-five minutes, directed by Armen Petrosyan. The series takes place in Yerevan.

== Series overview ==
Seasons	Number of episodes	Originally aired and ended	
Seasons	Number of episodes	First aired	Last aired
1	27	4 October 2014	31 December 2014
2	24	9 March 2015	27 May 2015
3	33	14 September 2015	31 December 2015
4	24	14 March 2016	15 June 2016
5	25	10 October 2016	31 December 2016
6	24	13 March 2017	31 May 2017
7	25	9 October 2017	31 December 2017
8	25	8 October 2018	31 December 2018
9	24	18 March 2019	5 June 2019

== Cast and characters ==
=== Main characters ===
Actor	Character	Seasons								
Actor	Character	1	2	3	4	5	6	7	8	9
Grigor Danielyan	Mushegh Danielyan	1	2	3	4	5	6	7	8	9
Gor Hakobyan	Felix Danielyan	1	2	3	4	5	6	7	8	9
Mihran Tsarukyan	Arsen Grigoryan	1	2	3	4	5	6	7	8	9
Arpi Gabrielyan	Lika Gabrielyan	1	2	3	4	5	6	7	8	9
Ani Yeranyan	Tatevik Yeranyan	1	2	3	4	5	6	7		

=== Recurring characters (more than one season) ===
- Mardjan Avetisyan portrays Tamara Avetisyan (seasons 1–9), an Authorized person by the owner of Full House. Tigran and Goharik's aunt is in love with Mushegh.
- Garik Sephkhanyan portrays Ruben Sepkhanyan (seasons 1–9), "Full House" Cafe's barman, waiter.
- Moso Karapetyan portrays Hrach Gabrielyan (seasons 1–9), Boxer, Cousin of Lika. Lives in United States.
- Lernik Harutyunyan portrays Gagas (seasons 1–2, 5–8), Yana and Eva's brother, Hrach's friend.
- Armen Petrosyan portrays Sergey Petrosyan (seasons 1, 3–9), The broker who lied to the boys and girls.
- Chistina Yeghoyan portrays Zara Yeghoyan (seasons 5–9), "Full House" café's waiter. Tamara's friend's daughter.
- Aida Karapetyan portrays Margo (seasons 5–6), Mushegh's mother-in-law, Ishkhan's grandmother.
- Mkrtich Arzumanyan portrays Ishkhan Danielyan (seasons 6–8), The father of Mushegh and the uncle of Felix.
- Ella Tarunts portrays Ella (seasons 1 and 3), Arsen's mother.
- Aghas Manukyan portrays Kamo (seasons 8–9), Mushegh's driver.

=== Recurring characters (only one season) ===
- Mariam Melikyan portrays Yana (season 1), Arsen's girlfriend and model.
- Anati Saqanyan portrays Ruzanna "Ruzan" (season 1), Manager of the "Full House" café.
- Lilit Haroyan portrays Eva (season 2), Lika's friend, whose girls are "used" to control Arsen.
- Adriana Galstyan portrays Ella Galstyan (season 3), A new tenant.
- Eva Khachatryan portrays Nora Khachatryan (season 3), A new tenant.
- Davit Aghajanyan portrays Tigran Avetisyan (season 2), Tamara's nephew. Director of "Full House" café (season 2).
- Marinka Khachatryan portrays Mane Yeranyan (season 4), Tatev's sister, who came from Stepanakert.
- Gevorg Martirosyan portrays Davit (season 4), Mane's boyfriend and classmate.
- Arman Hovhannisyan portrays Ishkhanik Danielyan (season 5), as Mushegh's son.
- Lili Karapetyan portrays Lilit (season 5), a designer, Felix's classmate and girlfriend.
- Hayk Petrosyan portrays Sevak (season 6), as Lika's boyfriend.
- Tamara Petrosyan portrays Nara Isahakovna (season 6), helps Sergey get Tamara to file for divorce, and is a psychologist-psychotherapist.
- Elen Asatryan portrays Knarik Asatryan (season 7), Reporter
- Gosh Hakobyan portrays Gosh (season 7), Actor, The boy in the TV series with Tatev
- Shogher Tovmasyan portrays Liza (season 8), Hairdresser, Felo's fake girlfriend.
- Levon Sargsyan portrays Abulik Yeghoyan (season 8), as Zara's brother. The director of a part of the "Full House" hotel.
- Maga Harutyunyan portrays Nana (season 8), the hairdresser, as Lisa's close friend.
- Arus Tigranyan portrays Goharik Avetisyan (season 9), as Tamara's brother's daughter.
- Jora Hovhannisyan portrays Arin (season 9), A Persian-Armenian who came to Armenia and intends to buy a house.
- Ani Kocharyan portrays Ruzanna (season 9), Zara and Abulik's mother, and Ruben's mother-in-law. The director of the "Full House" hotel.

== Season 1 (2014) ==
Two student girls decide to rent an apartment. Finding a cheap apartment for rent, they come to an agreement with the real estate agency and pay the 1-year rent. Moving to an apartment, the girls are surprised. Three men live in that house. It turns out that the same agent, under the same conditions, rented the apartment to those three boys as well. Realizing that the agent had deceived them and that no one was going to leave the apartment, they decided to stay and make the lives of those on the other side unbearable.

=== Cast ===
- Grigor Danielyan as Mushegh Danielyan
- Gor Hakobyan as Felix Hakobyan
- Mihran Tsarukyan as Arsen Grigoryan
- Arpi Gabrielyan as Lika Gabrielyan
- Ani Yeranyan as Tatevik Yeranyan

==== Recurring ====
- Marjan Avetisyan as Tamara Avetisyan
- Garik Sepkhanyan as Ruben Sepkhanyan
- Moso Karapetyan as Hrach Gabrielyan
- Anati Sakanyan as Ruzanna
- Mariam Melikyan as Yana
- Lernik Harutyunyan as Gagas

==== Guest ====
- Armen Petrosyan as Sergey Petrosyan (1/1)
- Stella Harutyunyan as customer (1/7)
- Lucie Hayrapetyan as Sara (1/8-9)
- Varda as himself (1/10)
- Sargis Tashchyan as Samo (1/10)
- Hasmik Abrahamyan as Lilit (1/17)
- Suren Pahlevanyan as Artak (1/18)
- Elizaveta Podobriaeva as Tania (1/19)
- Artsrun Harutyunyan as Mr. Babken (1/21)
- Sargis Grigoryan as himself (1/23)
- Artyom Hakobyan as himself (1/24)
- Ella Tarunts as Ella (1/25)

== Season 2 (2015) ==
The fight for an apartment continues in Full House. Each side tries to make the other side leave the apartment. Felix continues to fight for Tatev's love, but there is someone who makes his struggle more difficult. Tamara continues to pursue Mushegh. Tamara's nephew Tigran is coming to Armenia, whom his father sent to Armenia to get married. Arsen decides to put aside his personal life and pursue his career. But everything changes when Eva appears in his life

=== Cast ===
- Grigor Danielyan as Mushegh Danielyan
- Gor Hakobyan as Felix Hakobyan
- Mihran Tsarukyan as Arsen Grigoryan
- Arpi Gabrielyan as Lika Gabrielyan
- Ani Yeranyan as Tatevik Yeranyan

==== Recurring ====
- Marjan Avetisyan as Tamara Avetisyan
- Garik Sepkhanyan as Ruben Sepkhanyan
- Moso Karapetyan as Hrach Gabrielyan
- Davit Aghajanyan as Tigran Avetisyan
- Lilit Haroyan as Eva
- Lernik Harutyunyan as Gagas

==== Guest ====
- Hayk Harutyunyan as himself
- Roland Poghosyan as dog owner (2/6)
- Tsovinar Martirosyan as Melan (2/8)
- Adriana Galstyan as Margarita (2/15)
- Arsen Safaryan as himself (2/17)
- Anna Vanetsyan "Anchok as Ani (2/18)
- Garik Martirosyan as himself (2/20)
- Narek Haykazyan as Vardan (2/21-22)
- Artur Avagyan as pizza's delivery man (2/23)

== Season 3 (2015) ==
The rental period of the house expires in one day. The boys have accumulated a lot of money throughout the summer, and so have the girls. They will leave the apartment with great joy because they will finally get rid of each other. However, Tamara realizes that if the "Full Housers" leave the apartment, she will lose her love, Mushegh. Therefore, she takes an extreme step and steals the money they collected throughout the summer so nobody can leave the apartment. After that, the Full Housers stay in that apartment, but they encounter another problem.

=== Cast ===
- Grigor Danielyan as Mushegh Danielyan
- Gor Hakobyan as Felix Hakobyan
- Mihran Tsarukyan as Arsen Grigoryan
- Arpi Gabrielyan as Lika Gabrielyan
- Ani Yeranyan as Tatevik Yeranyan

==== Recurring ====
- Marjan Avetisyan as Tamara Avetisyan
- Garik Sepkhanyan as Ruben Sepkhanyan
- Moso Karapetyan as Hrach Gabrielyan
- Eva Khachatryan as Nora Khachatryan
- Adriana Galstyan as Ella Galstyan
- Armen Petrosyan as Sergey Petrosyan
- Ella Tarunts as Ella

==== Guest ====
- DJ Smoke (3/1)
- Martin Mkrtchyan as himself (3/7)
- Sone Silver as Nara (3/7)
- Lia Zakharyan as Alina (3/13)
- Mkhitar Avetisyan as Vanik (3/17)
- Harout Pambukhchyan (Dzakh Harout) as himself (3/21)
- Artavazd Yeghoyan as himself (3/21)
- Rafayel Yeranosyan as Bendeks (3/25)
- Grigor Sukiasyan as Wedding organizer (3/29)
- Razmik Amyan as himself (3/29)
- Vika Martirosyan as herself (3/29)
- Hovhannes Grigoryan as Arkadi (3/31)
- Vahe Manaseryan as Koryun (3/32)

== Season 4 (2016) ==
The people of Full House live under one roof, and everything seems fine. But it can not last long because the apartment owner who wants to sell it has appeared. Tamara comes to the rescue, buys the apartment, and rents it out to the Fullhousians on other terms. But it is not only that. Tatev's younger sister Mane is coming to Yerevan from Artsakh and will settle temporarily in Full House. No one can imagine how much of a headache Mane can cause to everyone.

=== Cast ===
- Grigor Danielyan as Mushegh Danielyan
- Gor Hakobyan as Felix Hakobyan
- Mihran Tsarukyan as Arsen Grigoryan
- Arpi Gabrielyan as Lika Gabrielyan
- Ani Yeranyan as Tatevik Yeranyan

==== Recurring ====
- Marjan Avetisyan as Tamara Avetisyan
- Garik Sepkhanyan as Ruben Sepkhanyan
- Moso Karapetyan as Hrach Gabrielyan
- Marinka Khachatryan as Mane Yeranyan
- Gevorg Martirosyan as Davit
- Armen Petrosyan as Sergey Petrosyan

==== Guest ====
- Vladimir Mkhitaryan as Samvel (4/1)
- Armen Dallaqyan as Aram (4/8)
- Hayk Grigoryan as Rmbo (4/8)
- Karine Khachatryan as Lida (4/8)
- Lala Khachikyan as Varduhi (4/10)
- Hrach Muradyan as himself (4/15)
- Artur Avagyan as operator (4/15)
- Hakob Hakobyan as presenter (4/15)
- Gevorg Kalemdaryan as Chugun (4/16)
- Armen Navasardyan as Vilen (4/18)

== Season 5 (2016) ==
It turns out that the people of Full House accidentally return at the same time after leaving the apartment and unexpectedly find out that the apartment was bought by Diaspora Armenians. Solving this problem, Tamara hands over the apartment to the Fullhousians again, this time on such terms that the Fulhousians agree to live on the same floor again completely free. Mushegh, who didn't like that idea at all, wants to leave the apartment at all costs. But Mushegh's son suddenly appears. Meeting his only heir 14 years later, it becomes Mushegh's main task to prove to his son that he can be a caring father.

=== Main Cast ===
- Grigor Danielyan as Mushegh Danielyan
- Gor Hakobyan as Felix Hakobyan
- Mihran Tsarukyan as Arsen Grigoryan
- Arpi Gabrielyan as Lika Gabrielyan
- Ani Yeranyan as Tatevik Yeranyan

==== Recurring ====
- Marjan Avetisyan as Tamara Avetisyan
- Garik Sepkhanyan as Ruben Sepkhanyan
- Moso Karapetyan as Hrach Gabrielyan
- Armen Petrosyan as Sergey Petrosyan
- Arman Hovhannisyan as Ishkhanik Danielyan
- Christina Yeghoyan as Zara Yeghoyan
- Lili Karapetyan as Lilit
- Aida Karapetyan as Margo

==== Guest ====
- Mher Nahapetyan as Sipan (5/1)
- Mayda Boshgezenyan as Piruz (5/1)
- Levon Abgaryan as Levon (5/17)
- Aram MP3 as himself (5/19)
- Gayane Aslamazyan as Luiza (5/22)
- Lernik Harutyunyan as Gagas (5/23)

== Season 6 (2017) ==
After living with Sergey for months after the marriage and patiently enduring his unbearable whims, Tamara decided to separate from Sergey, sharing with him his property, which amounts to 1 million dollars.

=== Main Cast ===
- Grigor Danielyan as Mushegh Danielyan
- Gor Hakobyan as Felix Hakobyan
- Mihran Tsarukyan as Arsen Grigoryan
- Arpi Gabrielyan as Lika Gabrielyan
- Ani Yeranyan as Tatevik Yeranyan

==== Recurring ====
- Marjan Avetisyan as Tamara Avetisyan
- Garik Sephkhanyan as Ruben Sepkhanyan
- Moso Karapetyan as Hrach Gabrielyan
- Armen Petrosyan as Sergey Petrosyan
- Christina Yeghoyan as Zara Yeghoyan
- Hayk Petrosyan as Sevak
- Tamara Petrosyan as Nara Isahakovna

==== Guest ====
- Armen Kushkyan as Investigator (6/1)
- Lernik Harutyunyan as Gagas (6/9,16)
- Arsen Grigoryan (Aso) as himself (6/9)
- Arsen Grigoryan (Mro) as himself (6/9)
- Arsen Grigoryan (Romance) as himself (6/9)
- Sergey Tovmasyan as Ono (6/10)
- Vasil Sargsyan as Mr. Grigoryan (6/10)
- Gagik Shamshyan as himself (6/11)
- Mkrtich Arzumanyan as Ishkhan Danielyan (6/13)
- Aida Karapetyan as Margo (6/15)
- Andranik Hakobyan as Hakob (6/17)
- Tatev Sargsyan as Inga (6/19, 23)
- Sos Janibekyan as Mika (6/20)
- Mher Khachatryan as Garik (6/20)
- Marieta Khojayan as Silva (6/21)
- Edgar Kocharyan as Karo (6/21)
- Artashes Aleksanyan as Sevak's father (6/24)

== Season 7 (2017) ==
After living together for years, this time the Fulhousians were allowed to arrange their lives as they imagined. Mushegh and Tamara got married secretly from relatives and lived carefree in Tamara's house. Unlike Mushegh and Tamara, Felix and Tatev went on a honeymoon after their wedding. Returning from the tour, Felix and Tatev are surprised after learning that Lika will continue to live in their house. This is not the only surprise, however. Everything turns upside down when Mushegh's father, Ishkhan appears and changes the lives of all our heroes.

=== Main Cast ===
- Grigor Danielyan as Mushegh Danielyan
- Gor Hakobyan as Felix Hakobyan
- Mihran Tsarukyan as Arsen Grigoryan
- Arpi Gabrielyan as Lika Gabrielyan
- Ani Yeranyan as Tatevik Yeranyan

==== Recurring ====
- Marjan Avetisyan as Tamara Avetisyan
- Garik Sephkhanyan as Ruben Sepkhanyan
- Christina Yeghoyan as Zara Yeghoyan
- Armen Petrosyan as Sergey Petrosyan
- Mkrtich Arzumanyan as Ishkhan Danielyan
- Elen Asatryan as Knarik Asatryan
- Gosh Hakobyan as Gosh
- Moso Karapetyan as Hrach Gabrielyan

==== Guest ====
- Erik Karapetyan as himself (7/4)
- Davit Hakobyan as Mos (7/5)
- Karen Boksyan as himself (7/6)
- Mher Alabegyan as Sahak (7/7)
- Hovhannes Hovhannisyan as Onik (7/8)
- Grigor Gabrielyan as Tatev's aunt's husband (7/8)
- Hayk Mirzoyan as Nver (7\9)
- Vladimir Poghosyan as Karen (7/10, 21)
- Bosson as himself (7/15)
- Sargis Hakobyan as Gosh’s uncle
- Lernik Harutyunyan as Gagas (7/20, 22)
- Seyran Novikyan as Sargis (7/24)

== Season 8 (2018) ==
After marrying Tamara, the situation in Mushegh's life has changed and they are waiting for the birth of their first child. After Felix's and Tatev's divorce, Felix fell into a deep depression and drowned his grief by drinking alcohol. The situation in the lives of Ruben and Zara has also changed. After marriage, Zara's father bought a hotel and gave it to them. And Arsen and Lika return to Armenia from the United States telling everyone that their return is temporary.

=== Main Cast ===
- Grigor Danielyan as Mushegh Danielyan
- Gor Hakobyan as Felix Hakobyan
- Mihran Tsarukyan as Arsen Grigoryan
- Arpi Gabrielyan as Lika Gabrielyan
- Mardjan Avetisyan as Tamara Avetisyan

==== Recurring ====
- Garik Sephkhanyan as Ruben Sepkhanyan
- Christina Yeghoyan as Zara Yeghoyan
- Armen Petrosyan as Sergey Petrosyan
- Moso Karapetyan as Hrach Gabrielyan
- Aghas Manukyan as Kamo
- Levon Sargsyan as Abulik Yeghoyan
- Shogher Tovmasyan as Liza
- Maga Harutyunyan as Nana

==== Guest ====
- Lernik Harutyunyan as Gagas (8/4)
- Spitakci Hayko as himself (8/16)
- Mkrtich Arzumanyan as Ishkhan Danielyan (8/19)
- Alice Meliksetyan as Masha (8/24)

== Season 9 (2019) ==
It turns out that Mushegh owes a large amount of money to the state and in case of non-payment he will be held criminally liable. Tamara's brother helps Mushegh, but the latter's greed gives way and he loses the whole amount to the casino. The failures follow one another and on the day when everyone has to leave the apartment, Goharik, Sargis's daughter, who has been living in Mushegh and Tamara's house for a long time, suddenly appears. There is a problem to hide the fact of selling the apartment from Goharik.

=== Cast ===
- Grigor Danielyan as Mushegh Danielyan
- Gor Hakobyan as Felix Hakobyan
- Mihran Tsarukyan as Arsen Grigoryan
- Arpi Gabrielyan as Lika Gabrielyan
- Mardjan Avetisyan as Tamara Avetisyan

==== Recurring ====
- Garik Sephkhanyan as Ruben Sepkhanyan
- Christina Yeghoyan as Zaran Yeghoyan
- Moso Karapetyan as Hrach Gabrielyan
- Aghas Manukyan as Kamo
- Arus Tigranyan as Goharik Avetisyan
- Jora Hovhannisyan as Arin
- Ani Kocharyan as Ruzanna

==== Guest ====
- Arman Hovhannisyan as himself (9/10)
- DJ Efo as himself (9/10)
- Artur Hakobyan as Bdeshkh (9/16)
- Armenchik as himself (9/23)
- Silva Hakobyan as himself (9/24)
- Anushik Arakelyan as Sona (9/24)
- Armen Petrosyan as Sergey Petrosyan (9/24)

== Awards and nominations ==
Year	Award	Category	City	Result
2016	Pan Armenian Entertainment Awards	Best Comedy	Los Angeles, CA	Won
