= Navur =

Navur Նավուր
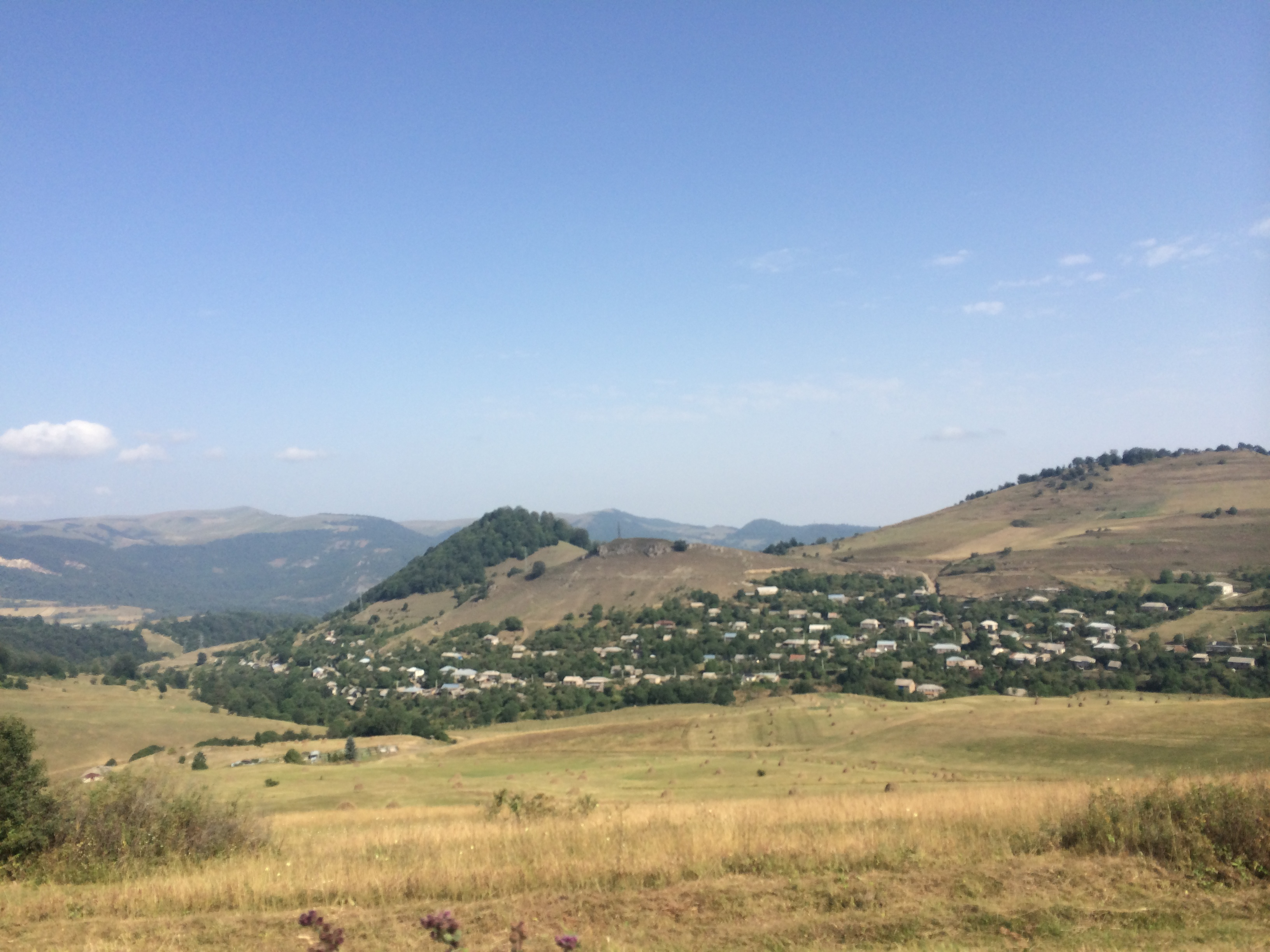
- A view of Navur

- Location within Armenia Location within Tavush
- Coordinates: 40°51′41″N 45°19′3″E
- Country: Armenia
- Province: Tavush
- Municipality: Berd

Population (2011)
  - Total: 1,065
- Time zone: UTC+4 (AMT)

Navur (Armenian: Նավուր) is a village in the Berd Municipality of the Tavush Province of Armenia.

== Gallery ==
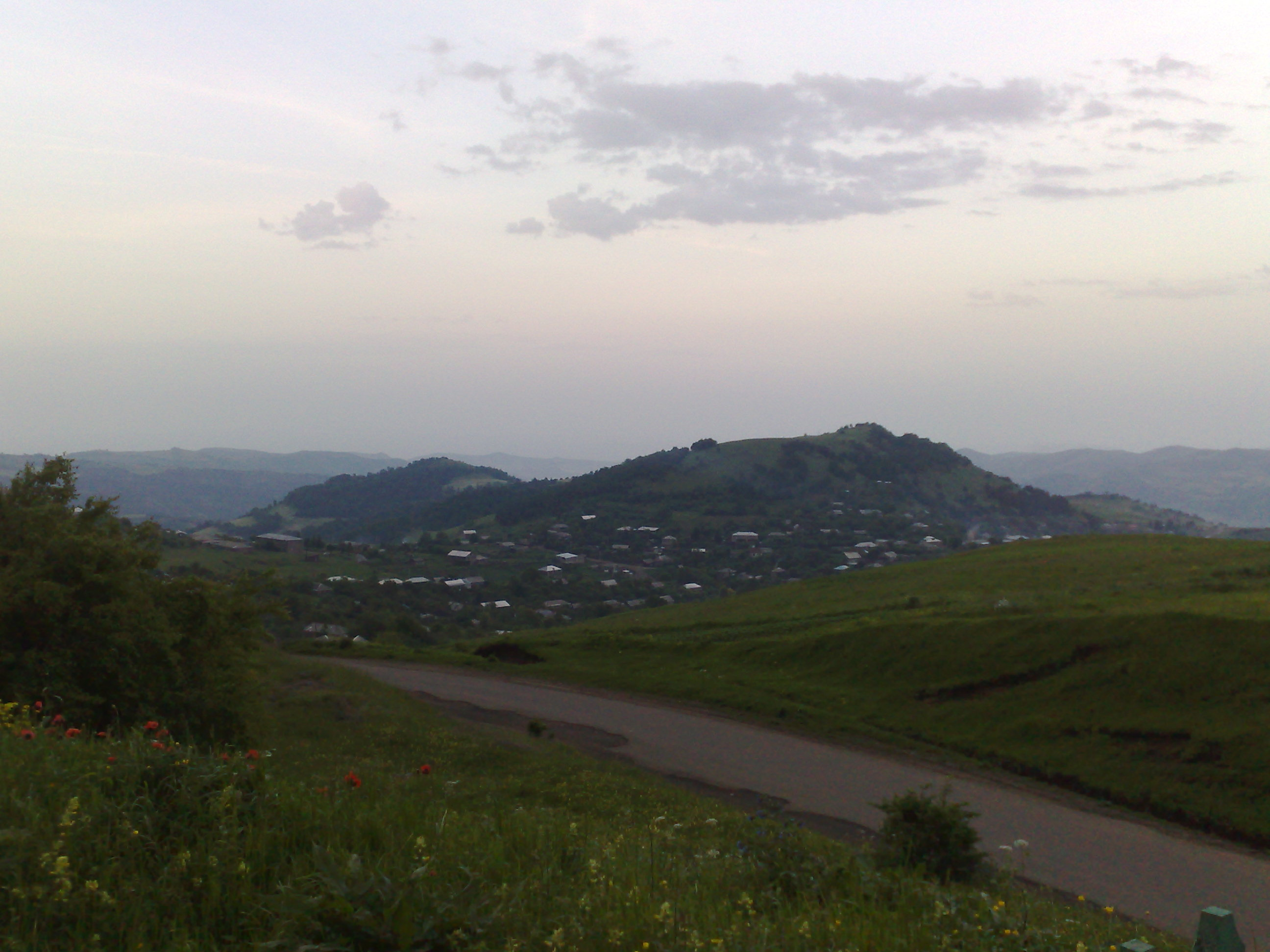
A view of Navur

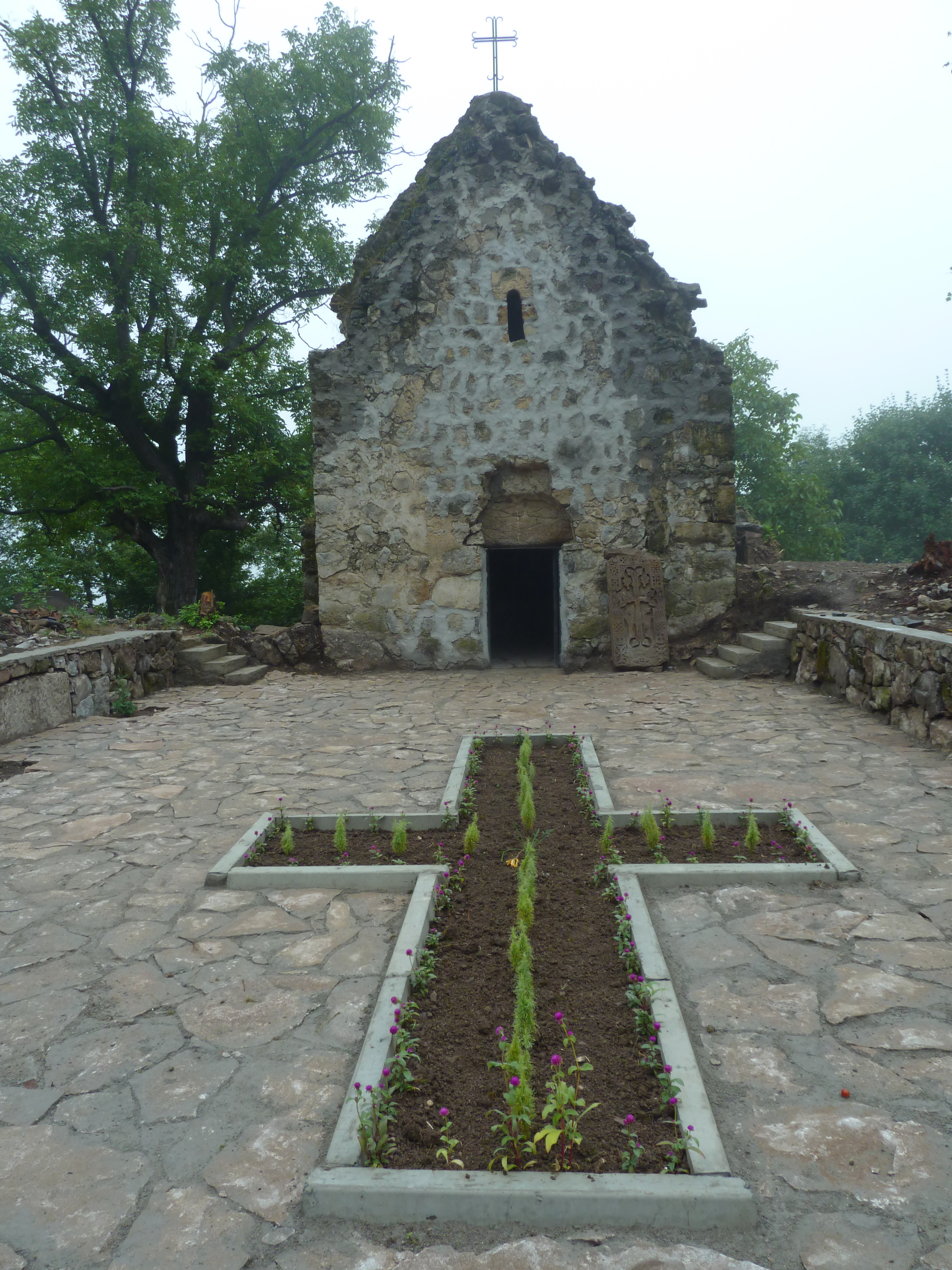
Mariam Mayri Vank in Navur

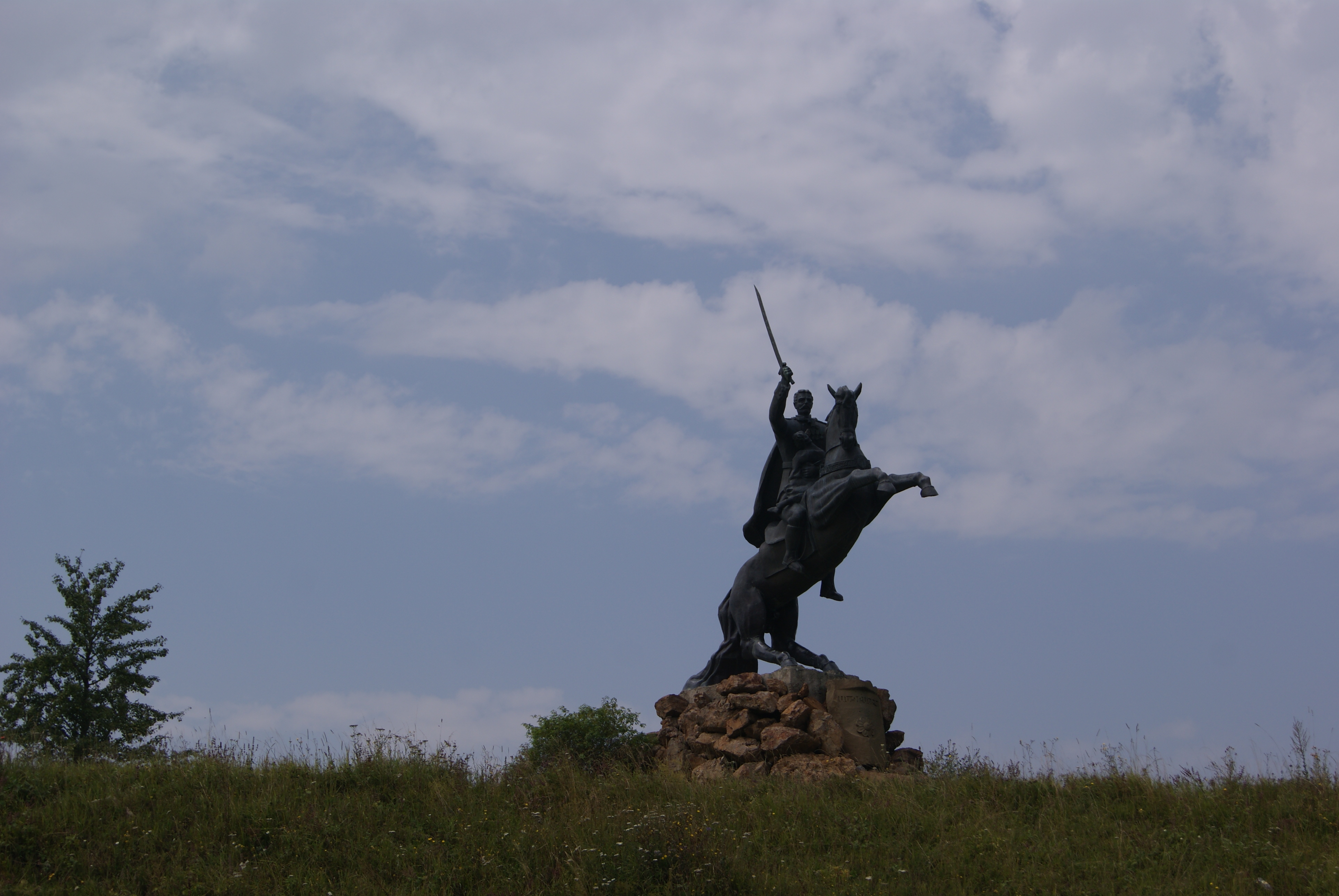
Statue of General Andranik in Navur

== Notable people ==
- Lernik Harutyunyan, actor
