= Canticle of Canticles (TV series) =

- Երգ Երգոց
- Presented by: Khoren Levonyan (2010–2020, 2022-2025), Hrant Tokhatyan (2013)
- Country of origin: Armenia

Production
- Executive producer: Hrachya Keshishyan
- Producer: Anna Grigoryan
- Production location: Yerevan
- Running time: 80–107 minutes

Original release
- Network: Armenia 1
- Release: 7 February 2010 – 22 June 2025

Canticle Of Canticles is a weekly one-hour musical program hosted by an Armenian presenters Khoren Levonyan and Hrant Tokhatyan, and airing on Yerevan-based Public Television company of Armenia. The project mainly focuses on the Armenian folk music – from medieval canticles to bard songs of the late 1980s.

== Awards and nominations ==
| Year | Award | Category | City | Result |
|---|---|---|---|---|
| 2017 | Swallow Music Awards | Best Music Program | Yerevan | Won |
