= Lernik Harutyunyan =

Armenian actor

Lernik Harutyunyan/Լեռնիկ Հարությունյան
- Born: Lernik Harutyunyan; May 16, 1981 (age 43); Navur, Tavush Province Armenian SSR, Soviet Union
- Education: Yerevan State Institute of Theatre and Cinematography
- Occupation: Actor
- Years active: 2005–present

Lernik Harutyunyan (Armenian: Լեռնիկ Հարությունյան, born on May 16, 1981) is an Armenian actor. He is known for his role as Armoosh on Lost & Found in Armenia. He was also featured in German, Persian and French films.

== Filmography ==
Film
Year	Title	Role	Notes
2006, 2021	Big Story in a Small City	Smoking Man	
2012	Lost & Found in Armenia	Armooush	
2012	Poker.Am		
2014	The Knight's Move		Short

Television and web
Year	Title	Role	Notes
2011	Money is Required (Պահանջվում է գումար)		Main Cast
2012-2013	Brothers (Եղբայրներ)	Levon	Recurring cast
2014–2015, 2017	Full House (Armenian TV series)	Gagaz	Recurring cast (8 episode)
2015	Chein Spasum	Himself	
