= Khoren Levonyan =

Armenian actor

Khoren Levonyan / Խորեն Լևոնյան
- Born: September 16, 1983 (age 42); Yerevan, Armenian SSR, Soviet Union
- Occupations: Presenter, Actor
- Spouse: Emma Azizyan

Khoren Levonyan (Armenian: Խորեն Լևոնյան; born September 16, 1983), is an Armenian presenter and actor. In 2017, Levonyan was awarded with the title of Honored Artist of Armenia. He is the presenter of AMPTV musical program titled Canticle Of Canticles. He is also the grandson of actor and director Khoren Abrahamyan.

== Filmography ==
- Big Story in Small City (2006)
- Don't Be Afraid (2007)
- Nothing Will Remain (2007)
- A Killed Dove (2008)
- Taxi "Still Good" (2009)
- The Memoirs of the Cross Thief (2010)
- Canticle of Canticles (2010-present)
- Five Brides (2011)
- Poker.Am (2012)
- Garegin Nzhdeh (2013)
- Love Odd (2015)
- Countdown (2017)
- The Path of Our Dream (2017)
- The Last Teacher (2019)
- Unknown Subscriber (2019)
- Anatolian History (2019)
- Masked Singer (Armenia) (2021)
- The other side of the Medal (2024)
- Grand Hotel (2024)
- Vazgen: The Last Sparapet (2025)
- Robbery in Armenian Style (2025)
- Precious Boys (2025)
