= Eva Khachatryan =

Armenian actress

- Born: Eva Khachatryan; December 13, 1990 (age 35); Yerevan, Armenian SSR, Soviet Union
- Education: Yerevan State Institute of Theater and Cinema
- Occupation: Actress
- Years active: 2006–present

Eva Khachatryan (Armenian: Էվա Խաչատրյան; born December 13, 1990), is an Armenian actress. She is known for her roles as Nora on Full House (Armenian TV series), and "Rita" on "Brothers (Armenian TV series).

== Filmography ==
Film
Year	Title	Role	Notes
2012	Poker.am		
2015	Four Buddies and the Bride (North-South)	Karine	
2017	Super Mother 2	Syuzi	Recurring cast

Television and web
Year	Title	Role	Notes
2011	Money is Required (Պահանջվում է գումար)		Main cast
2012	Dreams (Անուրջներ)	Sofi	Recurring cast
2012-2013	Brothers (Եղբայրներ)	Rita	Main cast
2014	Mother (Մամա)	Sara	Recurring cast
2014	Crossing Traces (Խաչվող Հետքեր)	Lana	Recurring cast
2015	Full House (Armenian TV series)	Nora	Recurring cast (season 3)
2015	The Guardian of Light (Լույսի Պահապանը)		Recurring cast
2016	Carte blanche (Քարտ բլանշ)	Sara	Main cast
2016–2018	Station (Կայարան)		Main cast
2018	To the landing (Դեպի վայրէջք)	Vika	Recurring cast
2019	Black mines (Սև հանքեր)	Meri	Main cast
2019	Death squad (Մահվան Ջոկատ)	Anush	Main cast
2021	Bloody bet (Արյունոտ խաղադրույք)	Dina	Main cast
2025	Օպերացիա Հովաշեն	Margo	Main cast

As herself
Year	Title	Notes
2017	3/OFF	Contestant
