= Gevorg Martirosyan =

Armenian singer and actor

- Born: Gevorg Martirosyan; Yerevan, Armenia
- Occupation(s): Actor, Singer
- Years active: 2010–present

Gevorg Martirosyan (Armenian: Գևորգ Մարտիրոսյան), is an Armenian singer and actor. His first video clip was released in 2012 (You are and I am). He has also participated in The Voice of Armenia in the group of Tata Simonyan. He was a guest of "Guess the tune" on 27 October 2015. In 2016 he also made his acting debut in Full House (Armenian TV series) (Season 4).

== Filmography ==
Television and web
Year	Title	Role
2016	Full House	Davit

== Discography ==
=== Singles ===
- 2012 Nov- "Du es Es em"
- 2012 Dec- "Snorhavor" (featuring with Armo)
- 2013 Feb- "New paths"
- 2013 Apr- "Earthly Angel "
- 2013 Jun- "Halala"
- 2013 Dec- "You are my life"
- 2014 May- "I am lucky"
- 2015 Mar- "Jan Jan" (Russian)
- 2015 Oct- "Wedding Day"
- 2016 Jul- "Duy Duy" (featuring with Mets Hayk)
