= Mihran Tsarukyan =

Armenian singer and actor (born 1987)

Mihran Csarukyan
- Born: Mihran; September 22, 1987 (age 38); Yerevan, Armenian SSR
- Occupations: Actor, singer
- Years active: 2005–present
- Spouse: Arpi Gabrielyan

Mihran Roberti Tsarukyan (Armenian: Միհրան Ռոբերտի Ծառուկյան, born September 22, 1987), is an Armenian singer and actor. His debut music video was released in 2011. He is known for his roles as Arsen on Full House, and Gor on the Armenian TV series Hard Life.

== Career ==
=== 2006–2007: Hay Superstar ===
In 2006, Tsarukyan became a contestant in season 2 of Hay Superstar, the Armenian version of Pop Idol. In the contest, he placed third and was disqualified on July 23.

== Personal life ==
In December 2019, Tsarukyan married presenter and actress Arpi Gabrielyan, who was his playmate in Full House. In July 2020, their son Robert was born.

== Filmography ==
Television and web
| Year | Title | Role | Notes |
|---|---|---|---|
| 2011–2013 | Hard Life | Gor | Main cast (510 episodes) |
| 2014–2019 | Full House | Arsen Grigoryan | Main cast (231 episodes) |
| 2019 | Fake Mama | Tom | Main cast |
| 2021 | Fake Papa | Tom | Main cast |
| 2021 | Fake Village Headman | Tom | Main cast |
| 2022 | Heir 80 | | Main cast (48 episodes) |
| 2023 | No money | | Main cast |
| 2024 | Treasures of Hopar | | Main cast |
| 2025– | Mardameky | Sevak | Main cast |

== Discography ==
=== Singles and songs ===
| Year | Title | English translation | Album |
|---|---|---|---|
| 2010 | "Asa te ur es" (Ասա թե ուրես) | Tell me where are you? | Non-album singles |
| 2010 | "Khostum" (Խոստում) | Promise | Non-album singles |
| 2011 | "Havata" (Հավատա) (for Hard Life TV series) | Believe | Non-album singles |
| 2011 | "Te inchu em kez sirum" (Ինչու եմ քեզ սիրում) (featuring Lilit Hovhannisyan) | Why do I love you | Non-album singles |
| 2011 | "Siro kino" (Սիրո կինո) | Love movie | Non-album singles |
| 2012 | "Kprkem" (Կփրկեմ) | Will save | Non-album singles |
| 2012 | "Gol" (Գոլ) | Goal | Non-album singles |
| 2013 | "Te kuzes" (Թե կուզես) | I you want | Non-album singles |
| 2013 | "Mi nayir" (Մի նայիր) | Don't look | Non-album singles |
| 2014 | "Srtis uzatze" (Սրտիս ուզածը) | Wanting of my heart | Non-album singles |
| 2014 | "Full House" (for Full House comedy TV series) | – | Non-album singles |
| 2014 | "Ov imanar" (Ով իմանար՞) | Who knew? | Non-album singles |
| 2014 | "New Year" (featuring with Full House band` Arpi Gabrielyan, Gor Hakobyan, Ani Yeranyan, Grigor Danielyan) | – | Non-album singles |
| 2015 | "Tznundd Shnorhavor" (Ծնունդդ շնորհավոր) | Happy Birthday to you | Non-album singles |
| 2015 | "Lyubi Minya Vsegda" (Люби меня всегда) (Russian) | Love me forever | Non-album singles |
| 2015 | "Mayrik" (Մայրիկ) | Mother | Non-album singles |
| 2015 | "Serdze moyo" (Cердце мое) (Russian) | My heart | Non-album singles |
| 2015 | "Anhnar e" (Անհնար է) (featuring Arpi Gabrielyan) | is impossible | Non-album singles |
| 2015 | "New Year" (featuring with Full House band` Arpi Gabrielyan, Gor Hakobyan, Ani Yeranyan, Grigor Danielyan) | – | Non-album singles |
| 2015 | "Hima Kimana" (Հիմա Կիմանա) | Will know soon | Non-album singles |
| 2016 | "To moya" (ты моя) | You my | Non-album singles |
| 2016 | "Full House" (for Full House comedy TV series, with Gevorg Martirosyan) | – | Non-album singles |
| 2016 | "Sirt unem" (Սիրտ ունեմ) | I have heart | Non-album singles |
| 2016 | "Gna – Gna" (Գնա Գնա) | Go – Go | Non-album singles |
| 2016 | "Tonir" (Տոնիր) | Celebrate | Non-album singles |
| 2016 | "De zhpta" (Դե Ժպտա) (Aram MP3, Iveta Mukuchyan, Anahit Shahbazyan, Roland, Erik, Christine Pepelyan, Yana & Mkrtich Arzumanyan) | Smile | Non-album singles |

== Awards and nominations ==
| Year | Award | Category | City | Result |
|---|---|---|---|---|
| 2016 | Pan Armenian Entertainment Awards | The Most Viewed Song (Anhnar e) | LA | Won |
