= Armenian State University of Economics =

Economics school in Yerevan, Armenia

- Հայաստանի պետական տնտեսագիտական համալսարան
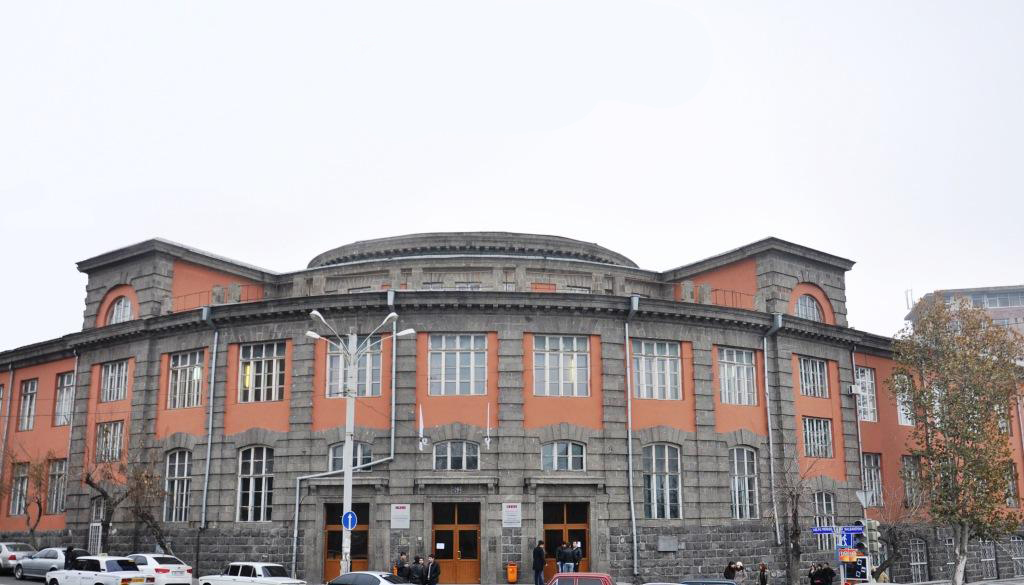
- Motto: We Are Changing
- Type: Public
- Established: 1975; 51 years ago
- President: Ruben Hayrapetyan
- Location: (Armenia) Yerevan, Armenia; 40°11′04″N 44°31′30″E
- Campus: Urban
- Website: asue.am
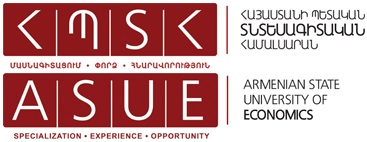

University rankings

Regional – Overall
- QS Emerging Europe and Central Asia: 241-250 (2022)

The Armenian State University of Economics (ASUE) (Armenian: Հայաստանի պետական տնտեսագիտական համալսարան) is a state-owned university of economics in Yerevan, the capital Armenia, founded in 1975.

== History ==
The faculty of Economics within the Yerevan State University was founded in 1930. In 1975 it was formed as an independent unit named Yerevan Institute of National Economy, and later as Yerevan State University of Economics.

In 1995 the university launched the new academic year in a new building at Nalbandyan 128. Only one of the departments is in Zeitun District.

In 2006 the university was renamed Armenian State University of Economics, a state non-commercial organization.

About 30.000 alumni have graduated from the university. Six departments of the university have a total of 31 chairs (21 professional and 10 non-professional).

There are one Corresponding Member of the National Academy of Sciences of Armenia, 35 Doctors of Sciences, Professors, 141 Doctors, Associate Professors, 87 Assistant Professors, 103 lecturers and mare that 60 specialists part-time teachers. The university has 7000 students with 18 specialties and many specializations.

The university implements bachelor's full-time degrees since 2005, and part-time since 2004, full-time master's degrees since 2009, as well as part-time. Full and part-time degree courses are implemented by a credit system.

The university also organized postgraduate studies (both part-time and full-time). Since the 2010-2011 academic year post-graduate studies have also passed credit system.

ASUE has educational and scientific relations with:

- Rostov State University of Economics (Russian Federation),
- Tomas Bata University in Zlin (Czech Republic),
- Tbilisi State University of Economic Relations (Georgia),
- Sankt-Petersburg State University of Economics and Finance (Russian Federation),
- Swansea Metropolitan University (Wales).

== Faculties ==
As of 2017, the university is home to the 6 following faculties:

- Faculty of Management

The main areas of study at the faculty of management are Business Management, Public and Municipal Management, Crisis Management, Tourism Management, Economics and Management of Enterprises, Labor Economics, Labor Law, etc.

- Faculty of Regulation of Economy and International Economic Relations

The faculty offers specializations in Theory of Economics, which was previously studied at the faculty of management, International Economic Relations, Macroeconomic Policy and Forecasting, Environmental Economics and Land-Property relations.

- Faculty of Finance

Banking, Insurance, Security Market Analysis, Customs management, Public and Corporate Finance are specializations that students get at the faculty.

- Faculty of Marketing and Business Organization

Disciplines studied at the faculty are Marketing, Commerce, Business Organization, Food Commodity Research and Quality Expertise, Non-food Commodity Research and Quality Expertise.

- Faculty of Computer Science and Statistics

Areas of study at the faculty are Statistics, Actuarial and Financial Mathematics, Information Systems, Electronic Business and Mathematical Methods and Models in Economics.

- Faculty of Accounting and Auditing

The faculty prepares graduates specialized in Accounting, Auditing and Taxation.

== Branches ==
=== Gyumri, Armenia ===
Gyumri Branch of ASUE was established in 1997. The branch had one department and two specialties (Finance and Credit, Accounting and Auditing). It is situated on Leningradyan street. The branch has specialties and specializations in (only full-time) Management (bachelor's degree), Finance (bachelor's and master's degree), Commerce (bachelor's degree), Business Organization (master's degree), International Economic Relations (bachelor's degree), and Accounting according to branches (bachelor's and master's degree).

About 500 students study at Gyumri branch of Armenian State University of Economics.

A two-level education system was started in the 2004-2005 academic year.

Educational process is organized according to the educational standards of ASUE by two level Bachelor's program and credit system. Mid term exams and tests are also organized.

The University has auditoriums, laboratories with computers, and internet access.

In 2000 an agreement was signed with the Department of Economics, Moscow State University. According to the agreement the best students of second year can continue their education at the Department of Economics, Moscow State University.

=== Yeghegnadzor, Armenia ===
The branch was established in 2007. First admission was in 2008 in the specialties of Finance, International Economic Relations and Management and Tourism Management. As of 2011-2012 the branch has 100 students.

The branch has a library, a computer auditorium is under construction.

Members of the Student council and other students are involved in volunteer and paid work. Due to the faculty and students of the branch and by the support of local and international organizations the Center of Youth Initiatives was established. The activities of the center involve students and young people of the city of Yeghegnadzor and neighboring municipalities.

The branch cooperates with local and international organizations, such as Sustainable Development Foundation, German GIZ, and with the Embassy of the United States in Armenia.

Annually 35-40% percent of students are granted scholarships on competitive basis.
