= Ani Yeranyan =

Armenian broadcaster and actress (born 1991)

- Born: Ani Yeranyan; 4 February 1991 (age 34); Yerevan, Armenia
- Education: Yerevan State Institute of Theatre and Cinematography
- Occupation(s): Actress, broadcaster, singer
- Years active: 2006–present
- Height: 168 cm (5 ft 6 in)

Ani Vardani Yeranyan (Armenian: Անի Վարդանի Երանյան, born on 4 February 1991) is an Armenian broadcaster and actress. She is known for her roles as Tatevik on Full House (Armenian TV series), Arevik on A Millionaire Wanted.

== Filmography ==
-
Year	Title	Role	Notes
2013	Chicago-Tzakhkatzor transit	Srbuhi	
2010	A Millionaire Wanted	Arevik	
2015	A Game by My Rules	Eva	

Television and web
Year	Title	Role	Notes
2010–2013	Top 10	Herself	
2010–2012	Anna	Ani	
2011–2012	Hot 10	Herself	
2012–2013	The General's Daughter	Nare	Main Cast
2014–2017	Full House (Armenian TV series)	Tatev	Main Cast
2017	Countdown	Marie / Arsine	Main Cast

As herself
Year	Title	Notes
2014	6th sense	Guest
2012	Found Dream	Guest

Music Video
Year	Title	Artist
2023	Im Mam	
2019	Не говори о любви	
2018	Only you	
2015	Hima Kimana	Mihran Tsarukyan
2015	Anavart Trichq	Christine Pepelyan
2008	Yes Qez Sirum Em	
2006	Sirel	
