= Grigor Danielyan =

Armenian singer and actor

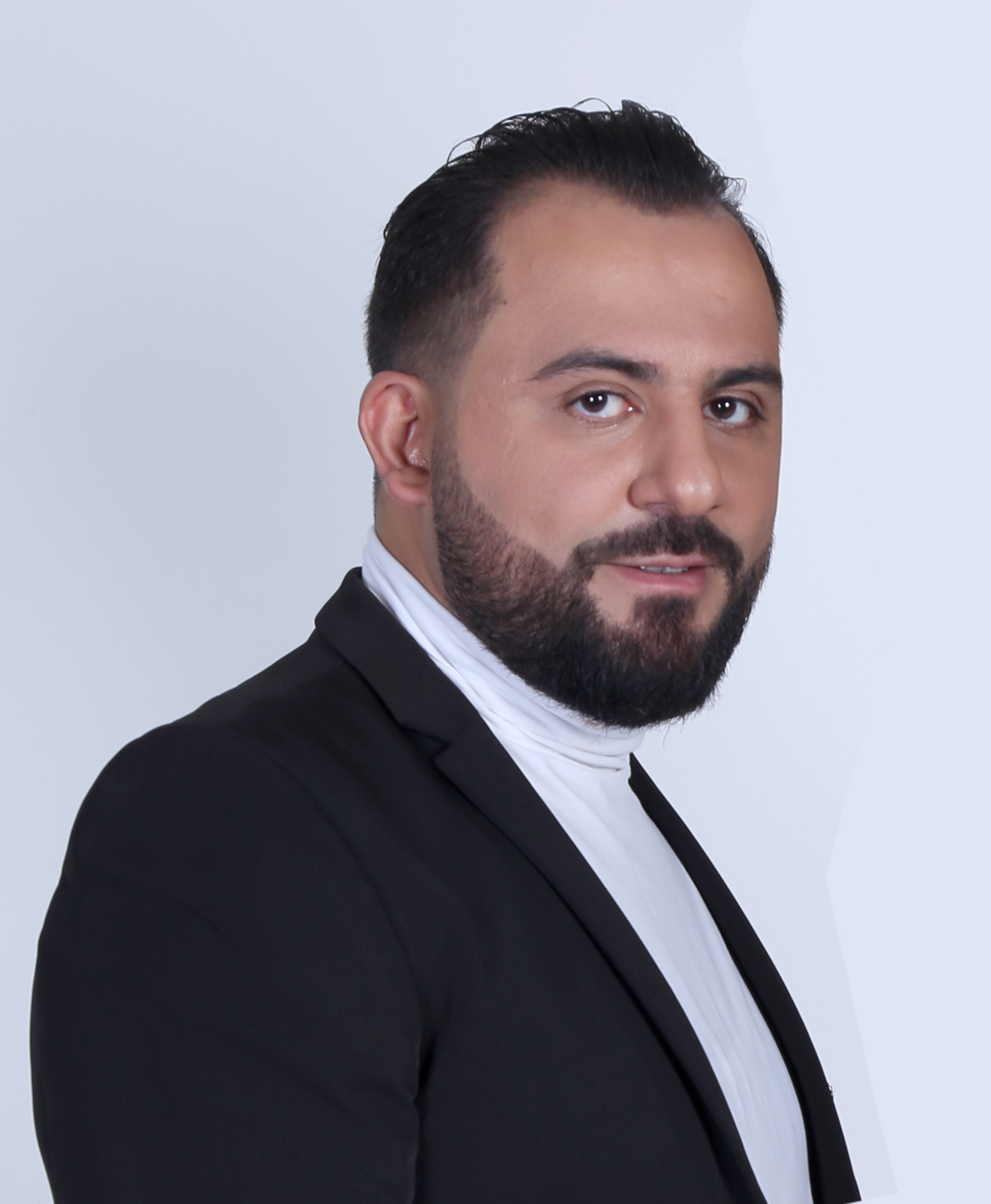
- Born: 11 January 1984; Yerevan, Armenian SSR, Soviet Union
- Education: Yerevan State Economic Institute
- Occupations: Actor, singer, scriptwriter, producer
- Years active: 2004–present
- Height: 180 cm (5 ft 11 in)
- Spouse: Hripsime Yelinyan

Grigor Alberti Danielyan (Armenian: Գրիգոր Ալբերտի Դանիելյան, born on January 11, 1984), is an Armenian scriptwriter, producer, singer and actor. He has been working for Armenia TV company since 2004.

== Biography ==
Grigor Danielyan was born on January 11, 1984, in Yerevan. In 2000 he graduated from "Quantum" college. In 2000-2005 he studied at the Yerevan State Institute of Economics. During his student years he played in the "Nar-Khoz" КВН team of the university. From 2003 to 2005, he assumed the position of the Chairman of the Culture Committee of the Student Council of the University.

In 2005-2007, being a member of the "Ararat" team, he played in the "Premier League" of the Moscow КВН and represented Armenia. He is one of the founders of the Armenian Student "КВН". He has worked as an editor in the league since 2004.

In 2006-2008 he worked at "Ararat FM" radio station, hosted the "Morning Yerevan" program. He performs mainly in the humorous genre. He has been working for Armenia TV since 2006. He is the author, actor, screenwriter and producer of a number of projects.

He is married to singer Hripsime Yelinyan and has two sons, Alberto and Roberto.

TV shows & Series
Year	Title	Seasons	Role
2006-2008	"P.S. club" Standup Show	4 seasons	Stand upper
2008-2014	"Yere1" TV show	10 seasons	Various roles
2014–2019	Full House (Armenian TV series)	9 seasons	Mushegh
2019	"Full Yere1"	1 season	Mushegh / Melo
2019–2021, 2023	"To The Camp" TV series	4 seasons	Koryun
2020-2021	"No Bride" TV series	2 seasons	Hamlet
2021	"Popcorn" Joke show	1 season	Various roles
2022-2024	"Surprise" TV series	4 season	Grish

== Filmography ==
Films
Year	Title	Role
2021	Once upon in school	Vardanyan
2022	Women in black	Amalyan
2024	To the Camp - Special Squad	Koryun
2025	Mall Napped	Hrant
2026	Full House - Landing	Mushegh

== Discography ==
Songs
Year	Title	Singer	Music	Lyrics
2008	"GJVUM EM" I go crazy	Grigor Danielyan ft Hripsime Yelinyan	Vardan Vardanyan	Grigor Danielyan
2010	"Ereqov" With three	Grigor Danielyan ft Hripsime Yelinyan	Grigor Danielyan	Felix Khachatryan
2012	"Pare Mer" Our dance	Grigor Danielyan ft Hripsime Yelinyan	Kiriakos Papadopoulos	Felix Khachatryan
2014	"Et Dardzir" Come back	Grigor Danielyan ft Hripsime Yelinyan	Grigor Danielyan & Emmanuel	Grigor Danielyan
2017	"Im Harstutyun" my wealth	Grigor Danielyan ft Hripsime Yelinyan	Richard Madlenyan	Grigor Danielyan & Richard Madlenyan
2018	"Happy Birthday"	Grigor Danielyan ft Hripsime Yelinyan	Gor Hakobyan	Grigor Danielyan
2020	"Ezaki" Unique	Grigor Danielyan ft Hripsime Yelinyan	Gor Hakobyan	Grigor Danielyan
2021	"Im srtov a na" I like her	Grigor Danielyan ft Hripsime Yelinyan	Richard Madlenyan	Grigor Danielyan
2025	"Erani mez"	Grigor Danielyan ft Hripsime Yelinyan	Grigor Danielyan	Grigor Danielyan
2025	'Qari pes"	Grigor Danielyan ft Hripsime Yelinyan	Grigor Danielyan	Grigor Danielyan
2025	'Hayrs Mayrs"	Grigor Danielyan ft Hripsime Yelinyan	Grigor Danielyan	Grigor Danielyan
