= List of programs broadcast by Armenia TV and Armenia Premium =

This is a list of television programs which are currently, formerly, or are soon to be broadcast on Armenia TV and Armenia Premium.

== Current programming of Armenia TV ==
=== News and information ===
- News Hour
- Sharp Angle (2012-present)
- Sharp Angle: Special Incidents (2014-present)

=== Dramas ===
- Flight (2016-2019)
- What Name Shall I Give This Love? 2 (2017-2018)
- Pomegranate Seed (2017-2019)
- Brothers (2017, repetition)
- Born without address (2019-2020)
- A Found Dream (2019)
- Mountain Girl (2020-2021)
- Swear (2021-2022)
- Blind World (2022-2023)

=== Sitcoms ===
- Domino (2015-2017)

=== Game shows ===
- 3/OFF (2017-2018)
- Sing If You Can (2019-2021)

=== Reality/other ===
- What? Where? When? (2002-present)
- The Voice of Armenia (2012-2014, 2017)
- R-Evolution (2013-present)
- Comments (2014-present)
- Nane (2014-present)
- Duty Section (2014-present)
- 01-99 (2014-present)
- Prescription (2017-present)
- Post Factum (2017-present)
- Formula Club (2017-present)
- Broadcast Queen (2017-present)
- Know more (2019-present)
- Noah's number (2023-present)

== Former/reran programming of Armenia TV ==
- Family Moments (1998-2000)
- Motor show-2000 (since 1998)
- Boomerang (1999-2003)
- Discovery (2000-2008)
- Evening with Hakob Rubinyan (2000)
- How are you friend?
- The day
- The opposite opinions
- Cities of the world
- Internet
- 24 frames per second
- Our City
- Zarmanazan
- Nanor show
- TV Kitchen
- Armenia-Diaspora
- Bernard Show (2001-2009)
- Blitz (2002-2007)
- Kargin Haghordum (2002-2009)
- Exclusive (2003-2008)
- Yo-Yo (2004-2009)
- My Big fat Armenian Wedding (2004-2008)
- Blef (2005-2008)
- Neighbours (2006-2010)
- P.S Club (2006-2008)
- Dil kam No Dil (2006-2008)
- Furor (2006)
- One Film Story (2006-2007)
- Unhappy Happiness (2007-2010)
- The Prisoners of Fate (2007-2008)
- Super Duet (2007)
- Kargin Multer (2007)
- National Star (2007)
- Yere1 (2008-2014)
- 32 Teeth Club (2009-2013)
- Masquerade (2009-2010)
- The Swollen Madmen (2009)
- Our Alphabet (2009)
- Fort Boyard (2009)
- Kargin Serial (2010-2013)
- Where is my Man? (2010-2011)
- Our Yard (2010)
- Hard Life (2011-2013)
- What Name Shall I Give This Love? (2011-2012)
- Money is Required (2011)
- Comments (2011/2012-2017)
- Don't lie to Me (2012)
- Tnpesa (2013-2015)
- Own Enemy (2013-2015)
- Out of the Braces (2013)
- Full House (2014-2019)
- Brainiest (2015-2017, 2019)
- The Leaders (2015-2017)
- Eyes of the Armenian (2015)
- The Azizyans (2017-2020)
- Crime and Punishment
- Armenian's eyes
- Armenians by Origin
- The Blbulyans (2021-2023)

== Special Current programming of Armenia Premium ==
=== Dramas ===
- Countdown (2017-2018)

=== Children's programming ===
- Children of the Orchestra (2017-2018)

=== Comedy shows ===
- Stand Up (2016-2021)

=== Sitcoms ===
- Golden School (2017-2018)
- Coocoorooz (2019)

=== Comedy shows ===
- Stand Up (2016-2021)

=== Game shows ===
- Sing If You Can (2019-2021)

== Special Former/reran programming of Armenia Premium ==
- Change (2016-2017)
- Ancient Kings (2016-2017)
- The Desirable Groom (2016-2017)
- The Azizyans (2016-2020)
- The Million in a Trap (2017)
- To a Dream (2017)
- To the Landing (2017)
- Purgatory (2017)
- The Deer Path (2017)
- Bought Happiness (2017)

== See also ==
- Television in Armenia
