= List of Armenian films of the 2010s =

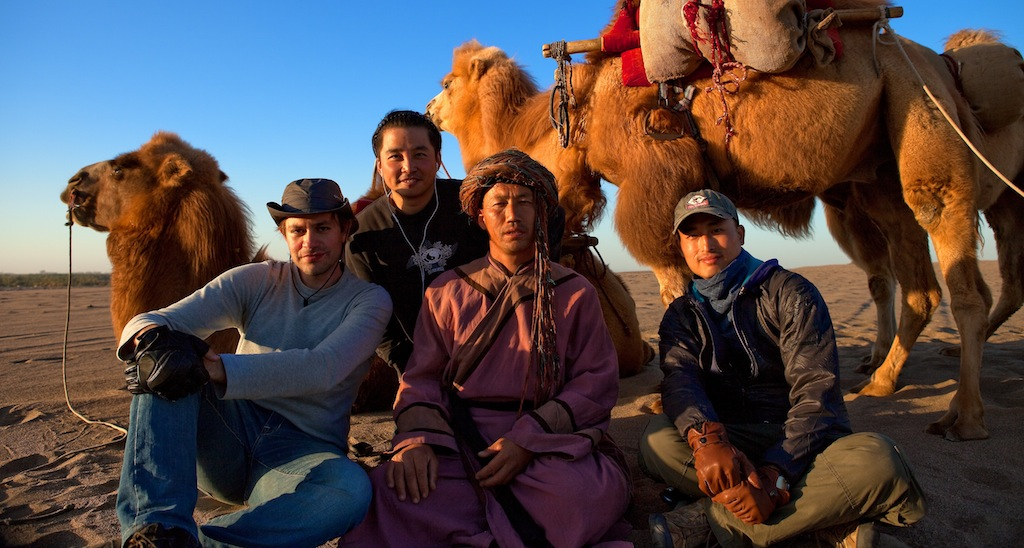
Andin: Armenian Journey Chronicles

This is a list of films released in the 2010s produced in Armenia or directed by Armenians or about Armenia or Armenians, ordered by year of release.

Title	Director	Cast	Genre	Notes
2010
2011
Sunrise over Lake Van	Artak Igityan; Vahan Stepanyan	Jean Pierre Nshanyan	drama	The film was screened at the 2011 Golden Apricot International Film Festival.
Joan and the Voices	Mikayel Vatinyan	Armine Anda	drama	The film had its world premiere at the 2011 Busan International Film Festival.
Ala-bala-nica	Arman Marutyan; Vahagn Khachatryan	Hayk Marutyan; Mkrtich Arzumanyan; Nazeni Hovhannisyan; Levon Harutyunyan	comedy	
2012
Եթե բոլորը If Only Everyone	Nataliya Belyauskene	Michael Poghosyan; Yekaterina Chitova	drama	The film was selected as the Armenian entry for the Best Foreign Language Oscar at the 85th Academy Awards, but it did not make the final shortlist.
Lost & Found in Armenia	Gor Kirakosian	David Sheridan; Jamie Kennedy; Angela Sarafyan	comedy	
Poker.Am	David Babakhanyan	Hovhannes Azoyan; Misho; Lili Elbakyan; Ani Petrosyan; Khoren Levonyan; Roland Gasparyan; Shorena Begashvili; Louisa Nersisyan	comedy	
2013
Paradjanov	Serge Avedikian; Olena Fetisova	Serge Avedikian; Yuliya Peresild; Zaza Kashybadze	drama, romance	
The Knight's Move	Gor Kirakosian	Hovhannes Azoyan; Mkrtich Arzumanyan; Asel Sagatova; Tamara Petrosyan	comedy	
2014
Andin: Armenian Journey Chronicles	Ruben Giney		epic documentary	
Anahit	David Sahakyants; Lyulya Sahakyants	Mkrtich Arzumanyan; David Babayan; Nazeni Hovhannisyan	animation	
Super Mother	Arman Marutyan; Vahagn Khachatryan	Hayk Marutyan; Ani Khachikyan	comedy	
2015
North-South	Vazgen Muradyan; David Babakhanyan	Diana Malenko; David Tovmasyan	comedy	
Love Odd	Arman Marutyan; Vahagn Khachatryan	Sergey Harutyunyan; Hayk Marutyan	comedy	
2016
Apricot Groves	Pouria Heidary Oureh	Hovhannes Azoyan; Samvel Sarkisyan; Maro Hakobyan	romance	
Earthquake	Sarik Andreasyan		drama	
Life and Fight/The Line	Mher Mkrtchyan	Samvel Tadevosyan; Ani Khachikyan; Hayk Petrosyan; Samvel Topalyan; HT Hayko	drama	
Run Away or Get Married	Hayk Kbeyan	Iveta Mukuchyan; Mkrtich Arzumanyan	comedy	
The Promise	Terry George	Oscar Isaac; Charlotte Le Bon; Christian Bale; Angela Sarafyan	historical drama	Historical drama film about the Armenian Genocide
2017
Yeva	Anahit Abad		drama	
Super Mother 2	Arman Marutyan; Vahagn Khachatryan	Vigen Tadevosyan; Ani Vardanyan	comedy	
2018
Taniel	Garo Berberian	Sean Bean; Tigran Gaboyan; Yegya Akgun	arthouse film noir	Taniel is a mult award-winning short film, about the last months of the Armenian poet Daniel Varoujan, filmed in the Film Noir style. The film has won more than 15 awards globally, screening in New York, Sydney, Vienna, London amongst others.
Agent 044	Hayk Kbeyan	Mkrtich Arzumanyan; Hayk Sargsyan; Mariam Adamyan; Armen Margaryan; Mariam Davtyan; Makar Galstyan	detective, comedy	
