= Hayko Mko =

Armenian comedy group

Hayko Mko (Armenian: Հայկո Մկո) was an Armenian comedian duo made up of Hayk Marutyan (known as Hayko) and Mkrtich Arzumanyan (known as Mko). They are best known from Kargin Haghordum and Kargin Serial, two popular comedy shows starring Hayko and Mko as main actors. Currently, they do not work together.

== Early years ==
=== Hayko ===
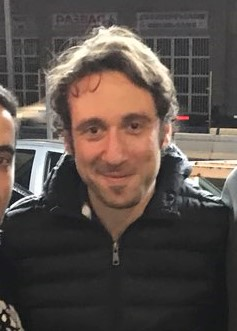
Hayk Marutyan (Hayko)

Hayko is Hayk Marutyan (Armenian: Հայկ Մարության), born 18 December 1976, Yerevan). From first through 7th grade, he went to the School #83 and continued his education in Anania Shirakatsi Seminary, where he spent his 8th, 9th and 10th grades. From 1992-1997, he went to the State Engineering University. From 1995-2002, he was a member of the Armenian Project (Russian: Армянский проект) KVN team of the same university. Hayko worked for Sharm Holding from 1996 to 2002 as a scriptwriter, director. As an actor, he played in 220 Volt (1996), Valyur (1996), Our Yard (1996), Our Yard 2 (1998), Tuyn Kaset (2000), Urish Kaset (2000), Banda (2000), and Komertsion Nerkayatsum (2001). He was the Mayor of Yerevan, having been elected in 2018 and served until 2021.

=== Mko ===
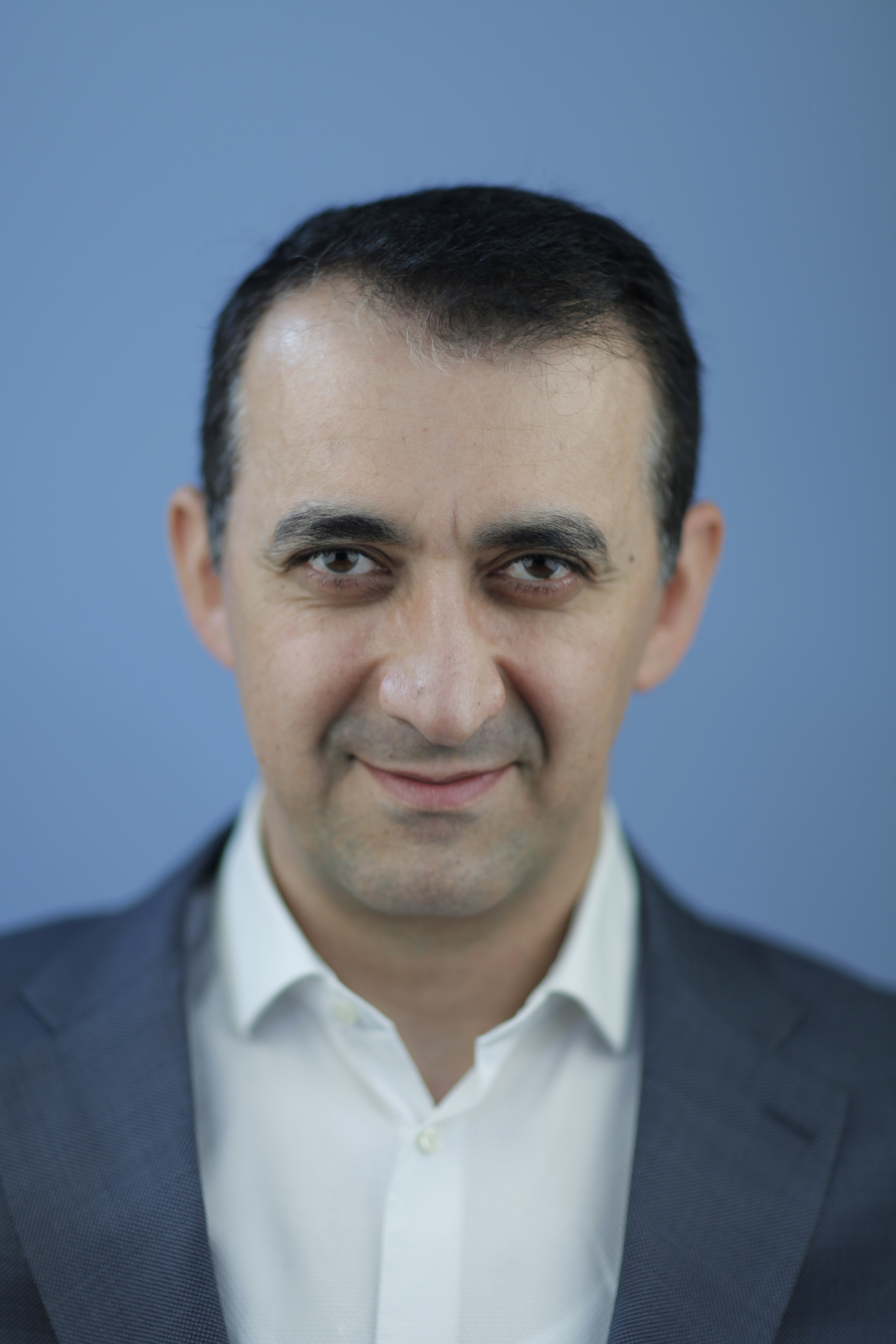
Mkrtich Arzumanyan (Mko)

Mko is Mkrtich Arzumanyan (Armenian: Մկրտիչ Արզումանյան, born 10 August 1976, Gyumri). He went to School #23 and School #14 of Gyumri. From 1992-97, he went to the Gyumri branch of the State Engineering University. From 1995-1996, he played in universities and from 1997-2002, in the 'Armenian Project' (Russian: Армянский проект) KVN team. In 2002, Mko was included in the 21st century team of KVN and participated in a jubilee game in Moscow.

Mko worked for Sharm Holding from 1996 to 2002 as a scriptwriter. As an actor, he played in 220 Volt (1996), Valyur (1996), Our Yard (1996), Our Yard 2 (1998), Tuyn Kaset (2000), Urish Kaset (2000), and Banda (2000).

The duo became very well-known with Kargin Haghordum (Armenian: Կարգին հաղորդում; Cool Program) that had a seven-year run from 2002 to 2009 as an Armenian comedy TV show airing in Armenia on the Armenia TV channel. It was one of the most popular and successful comedy shows in post-independent Armenian history.

== Works ==
- 1996: 220 Volt
- 1996: Vaylur
- 1997: Our Yard
- 1998: Our Yard 2
- 2000: Tuyn Kaset
- 2000: Urish Kaset
- 2000: Banda
- 2003-2009: Kargin Haghordum
- 2006, 2007, 2009: 7.5 (in 2009, with 32 Atam), theatrical performance
- 2007-2009: Kargin Multer
- 2010-2013: Kargin Serial
- 2011: Alabalanica
- 2011: No Comment, theatrical performance
- 2013-2015: Tnpesa (Mko only)
- 2013: The Knight's Move (Mko only)
- 2014: Super Mother (Hayko only)
- 2014: Gosha (Mko only)
- 2015: Love Odd (Hayko only)
- 2015: North-South (Mko only)
- 2016: Run Away or Get Married (Mko only)
- 2016-2020: The Azizyans (Hayko only)
- 2017: Full House (Mko only)
- 2017: Super Mother 2 (Hayko only)
- 2018: Agent 044 (Mko only)
- 2019: Large to Small (Mko only)
- 2019: Fake Mama (Mko only)
- 2020: For Honor (Mko only)
- 2020: Fluffy Toy (Mko only)
- 2021: Fake Papa (Mko only)
- 2021: Fake Village Headman (Mko only)
- 2023: Agent 044: Operation Garni (Mko only)
