= Mkrtich Arzumanyan =

Armenian actor and comedian

- Մկրտիչ Արզումանյան
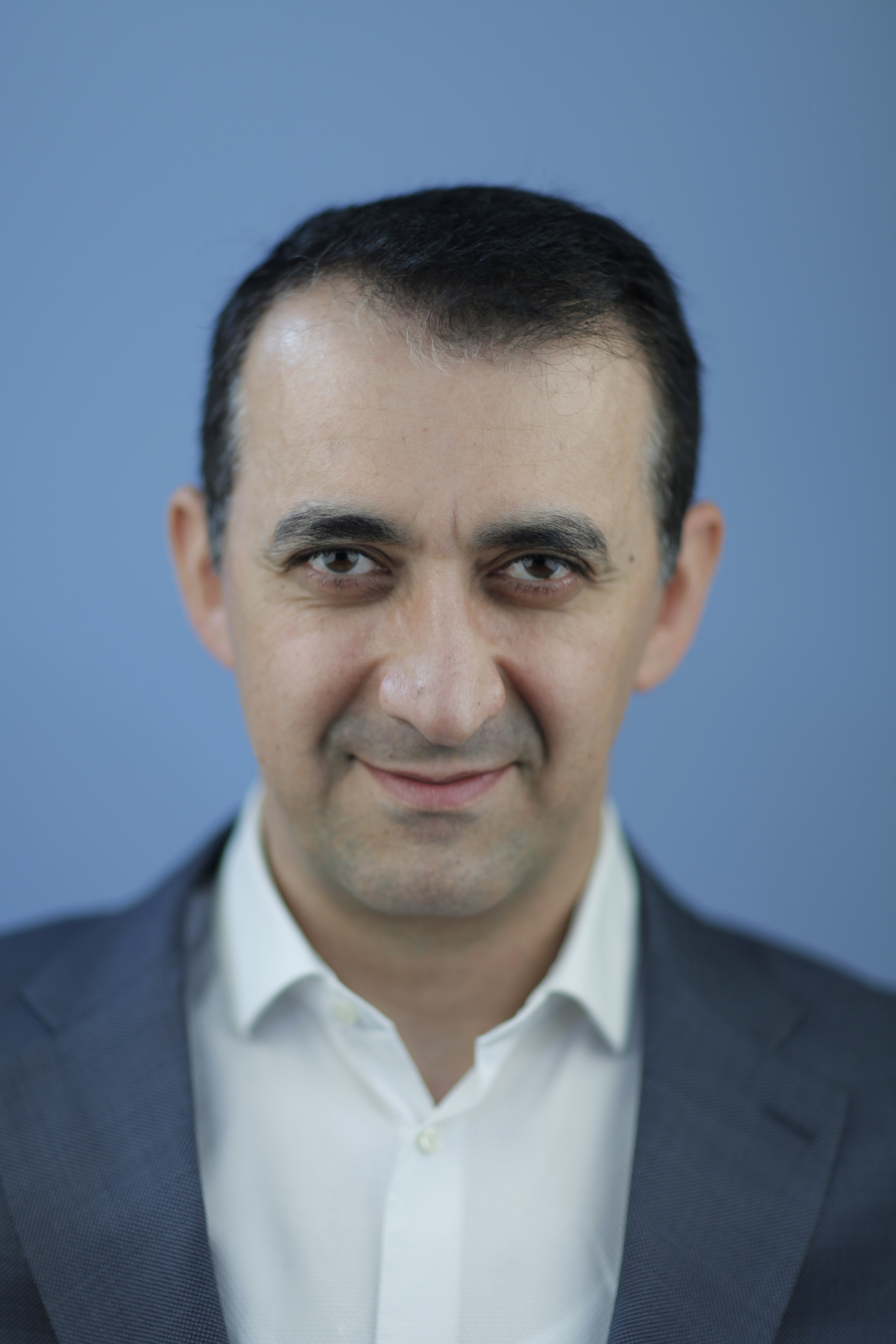
- Born: Mkrtich Arzumanyan; August 10, 1976 (age 49); Gyumri, Armenian SSR, Soviet Union
- Citizenship: Armenian
- Occupations: Actor, humorist, showman, scriptwriter, producer
- Years active: 1996–present
- Height: 6 ft 3 in (191 cm)

Mkrtich Aleksani Arzumanyan (Armenian: Մկրտիչ Ալեքսանի Արզումանյան; born August 10, 1976), better known as Mko (Armenian: Մկո) is an Armenian actor, humorist, showman, screenwriter, and producer. He is known from the comedy duo "Hayko Mko" (with Hayk Marutyan). The duo's most famous shows were Kargin Haghordum and Kargin Serial. Due to these, he is widely known as Kargin Mko (Armenian: Կարգին Մկո).

== Education ==
Mkrtich studied at the Russian school N23 after N.K. Krupskaya in Gyumri. After the devastating earthquake of 1988 he moved to school N14. In 1993 he entered the State Engineering University Of Armenia (Gyumri branch). In the third year of university studying, he was included in the KVN team of SEUA Gyumri branch, after which the "New Wave" KVN Group was formed, «Армянский проект» KVN; KVN team of Armenia is formed based on the teams' best players. He worked as an actor, TV host, scriptwriter, producer, and director.

== Filmography ==
Mkrtich starred in more than 10 movies and TV shows. The first movie which he starred in was "Our Yard" (Armenian: Մեր բակը) in 1996. The first television broadcast which he starred in was a humorous project called "220 Volt" of "Sharm Holding", which has been followed by "Mut Patmutyun" project. In 2002, he started his career in "Kargin Haghordum" comedy program, which has been followed by "Kargin Serial" where he has played the role of Adik (Arkadi Karagyozyan). The famous TV show lasted 6 seasons. In 2013 he began starring in "Tnpesa" sitcom.

=== Roles ===
Film
Year	Name of Movie	Role	Genre	Director	Playmates
2018	Agent 044	Hansel Brutents	Detective, Comedy	Hayk Kbeyan	Hayk Sargsyan; Mariam Adamyan; Armen Margaryan; Mariam Davtyan; Makar Galstyan
2016	Run Away or Get Married	Arshavir Khojoyan, Aghasik Khojoyan	Comedy, Adventure	Hayk Kbeyan	Iveta Mukuchyan
2015	North-South (Հյուսիս-Հարավ)	Lambert Khachaturovich	Comedy	Davit Babakhanyan	Sos Janibekyan; David Tovmasyan; Mikael Abrahamyan; Hayk Margaryan; Diana Malenko; Sona Shahgeldyan
2015	«11։44»		Drama	Artak Zilfimyan	Armen Jigarkhanyan; Sos Janibekyan; Rafael Qotanjyan
2014	Anahit	Andok	Cartoon, Family, Adventure	David Sahakyants; Lyulya Sahakyants	Nazeni Hovhannisyan; Rafael Qotanjyan; Hrant Tokhatyan; Shushan Petrosyan
2013	The Knight's Move (Քայլ ձիով)	Felix Balayan	Comedy, Adventure	Gor Kirakosyan	Hovhannes Azoyan; Asela Sagatova; Sos Janibekyan; Levon Harutyunyan
2013	Grandfather 005	Aaron Schultz	Comedy	Arkadi Grigoryan; Mher Mkrtchyan	Sergey Shakurov; Vaghtang Kikabidze; Hrant Tokhatyan
2011	Alabalanica	Tsolak Karpich	Comedy	Vahagn Khachatryan; Arman Marutyan	Hayk Marutyan; Nazeni Hovhannisyan; Levon Harutyunyan; Hasmik Gharibyan
2009	New Year's Movie	Militonyan	Comedy, Musical	Edgar Baghdasaryan	Hovhannes Azoyan; Julieta Stepanyan; Vigen Stepanyan; Hasmik Karapetyan; Armen Petrosyan; Forsh
2000	Banda	Voskan	Comedy	Vahe Khachatryan	Hayk Marutyan; Hayk Khachatryan; Aramo; Mark Saghatelyan
1998	Our Yard 2 (Մեր բակը 2)	Mko	Musical, Comedy	Mikael Dovlatyan	Hrant Tokhatyan; Ashot Ghazaryan; Lala Mnatsakanyan; Armen Khostikyan
1996	Our Yard (Մեր բակը)	Mko	Musical, Comedy	Mikael Dovlatyan	Hrant Tokhatyan; Ashot Ghazaryan; Lala Mnatsakanyan; Armen Khostikyan; Aram Asatryan

Television
Year	Title	Role	Notes
2014–2019	Full House	Ishkhan	
2014	Grandfather 005	Detective	
2013–2015	Tnpesa	Koryun Anoushavanich, Anoushavan granpa	
2010–2013	Kargin Serial	Arkadi Karagyozyan (Adik)	
2007	Kargin Multer	Different Roles	
2002–2009	Kargin Haghordum	Different Roles	
