= Purgatory (disambiguation) =

Purgatory is, in Roman Catholic and other religious teachings, a temporary state of the dead.

Purgatory may also refer to:

== Literature ==
- Purgatorio (Purgatory), the second part of Dante's Divine Comedy
- Purgatory (drama), a 1938 play by William Butler Yeats
- Purgatory (2000 AD), a Judge Dredd comics spinoff story
- Purgatori, a Chaos! Comics character
- Purgatory (comics), a supervillain from DC Comics

== Film and television ==
=== Film ===
- Purgatory, a 1998 Russian television film by Alexander Nevzorov
- Purgatory (1999 film), an American Western fantasy television film directed by Uli Edel
- Purgatory (2007 film), a Spanish short film
- Purgatory, Colorado, a fictional town in the 1971 film Support Your Local Gunfighter!
- Purgatory (1988 film), starring Tanya Roberts
- Purgatory (2026 film), a comedy-drama film directed by Lindsay Lanzilotta

=== Television ===
- Purgatory (TV series), a 2017–2018 Armenian mystery drama series
- "Purgatory" (Arrow), an episode
- "Purgatory" (Law & Order: Criminal Intent), an episode
- "Purgatory" (Third Watch), an episode
- Purgatory (Wynonna Earp), a fictional town in which the series is set

== Music ==
=== Artists ===
- Purgatory (band), an Indonesian heavy metal band
- Iced Earth, previously named Purgatory, an American heavy metal band

=== Albums ===
- Purgatory (Borealis album) or the title song, 2015
- Purgatory (The Tossers album) or the title song, 2003
- Purgatory (Tyler Childers album) or the title song, 2017
- Purgatory (Despised Icon album), 2019

=== Songs ===
- "Purgatory" (song), by Iron Maiden, 1981
- "Purgatory", by Kim Petras from Turn Off the Light, 2019

=== Opera ===
- Purgatory, a 1958 opera by Hugo Weisgall based on Yeats's drama
- Purgatory, a 1966 opera by Gordon Crosse based on Yeats's drama

== Other uses ==
- Purgatory Correctional Facility, the county jail of Washington County, Utah, US
- Purgatory Resort, a ski area in Colorado, US
- Purgatory Chasm State Reservation, a geologic state park in Sutton, Massachusetts
  - Purgatory Conglomerate, a geologic unit named for Purgatory Chasm

== See also ==
- St. Patrick's Purgatory, an ancient pilgrimage site on Station Island in Lough Derg, County Donegal, Ireland
- Purgatorio (disambiguation)
- Purgatoire (disambiguation)
- Pugatory, an animated webseries created by Marzia Kjellberg
