= Tovuz =

Tovuz may refer to:

- Tovuz, Armenia
- Tovuz District, Azerbaijan
- Tovuz, Azerbaijan
