= Ani Lupe =

Armenian actress (born 1984)

- Born: Ani Grigoryan; June 15, 1984 (age 40); Yerevan, Armenian SSR, Soviet Union
- Education: Yerevan State Institute of Theatre and Cinematography
- Occupation: Actress
- Years active: 2004–present

Ani Grigoryan (Armenian: Անի Գրիգորյան, born on June 15, 1984), better known by her stage name Ani Lupe (Անի Լուպե), is an Armenian actress. She is known for her role as Ruzan Azizyan on The Azizyans.

== Life ==
Grigoryan was born in Yerevan on June 15, 1984. She finished her school in 2001 and in the same year she began studying at the Yerevan State Institute of Theatre and Cinematography. During her studying, she also worked at Yerevan State Institute of Musical Chamber Theater as an actress. In 2009, she began her working at Yerevan State Institute of Chamber Theater. She has played in many presentations, such as Kabare, Neron and Shat Love Story.

== Filmography ==
Television and web
Year	Title	Role	Notes
2016–2020	The Azizyans	Ruzan Azizyan	Main Cast

== Awards and nominations ==
Year	Award	Category	City	Result	Ref
2013	Artavasd Awards	The Best Young Actress	Yerevan	Won	
