= Ruben Muradyan =

Armenian ballet dancer, presenter and actor

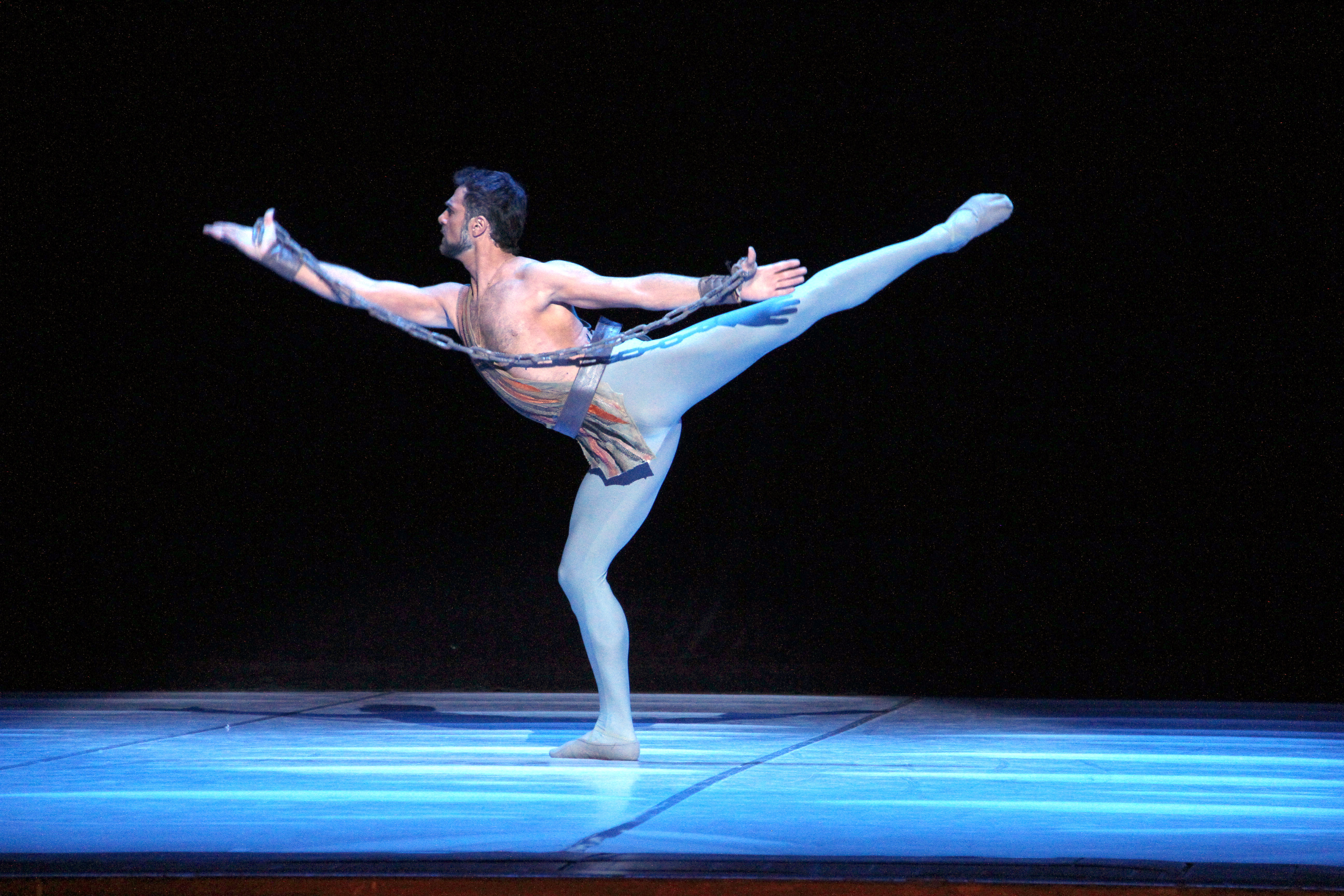
- Muradyan in the Spartacus ballet in 2015
- Born: April 14, 1989 (age 36); Apaga, Armenia
- Education: Yerevan State Institute of Theatre and Cinematography
- Occupations: Ballet dancer; actor
- Years active: 2004–present
- Height: 192 cm (6 ft 4 in)
- Children: 2

Ruben Artavazdi Muradyan (Armenian: Ռուբեն Արտավազդի Մուրադյան, born 14 April 1989) is an Armenian ballet dancer, presenter and actor. He is a leading soloist with the Yerevan Opera Theatre and an Honored Artist of Armenia (2016).

== Early life and career ==
Muradyan was born on 14 April 1989, in the village of Apaga, Armavir Province. In 1999–2007, he studied at the Yerevan State Dance College. In 2006–2011, he studied at the Yerevan State Institute of Theatre and Cinematography. Since 2004 he has been working at the Yerevan Opera Theatre as a leading soloist.

Muradyan has toured the USA with the Bolshoi Theatre of Moscow and has appeared on the Spartacus ballet as Spartacus. He has also toured Spain, Italy, France, Russia and Qatar.

In 2014, Muradyan starred as the love interest of singer Lilit Hovhannisyan in the music video for "De El Mi". In 2016, he appeared in two Armenia TV series Honeymoon and Ancient Kings. In 2016, he was awarded with Honored Artist of Armenia. Since 2019, Murdayan has been hosting the morning program Morning of Light (Aravot luso) on Public Television Company of Armenia. In 2021, he starred in the series The Mechanics of Happiness along with actress Nazeni Hovhannisyan.

== Personal life ==
Muradyan is married and has a daughter and a son.

== Accolades ==
Year	Ceremony/Award	Notes
2007	Joinville Dance Festival	third place, bronze medal
2008	2nd Yury Grigorovich International Contest	first place, golden medal
2010	Movses Khorenatsi medal	
2016	Honored Artist of Armenia	

== Filmography ==
Television series
Year	Title	Role
2016–2017	Honeymoon	Arman
2016–2017	Ancient Kings	Mushegh
2021	The Mechanics of Happiness	Ruben
