= Ralph Yirikian =

Armenian businessman

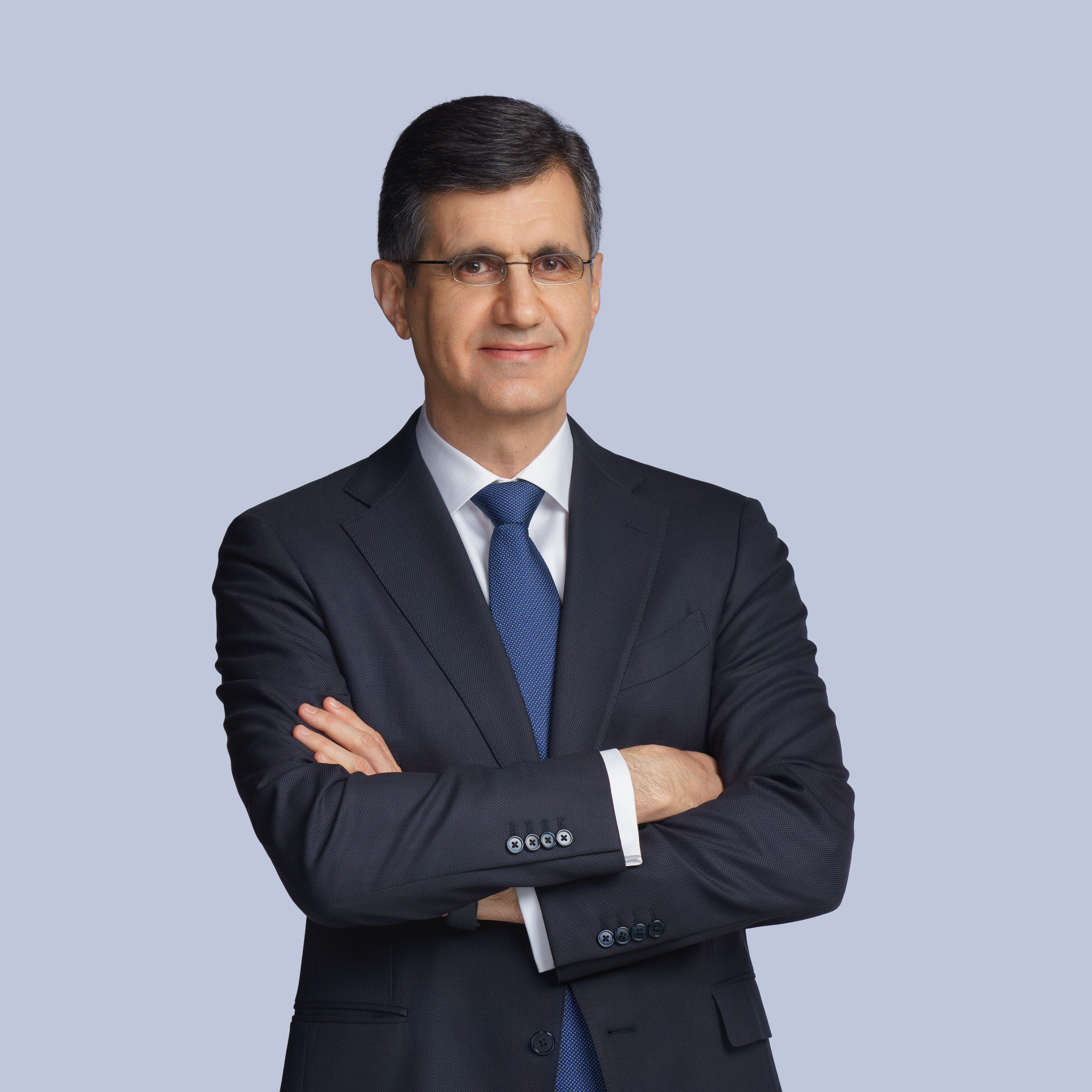
- Born: November 16, 1967 (age 58); Beirut, Lebanon
- Education: American University of Beirut
- Known for: General Director at Ucom; Former General Director of VivaCell-MTS

Ralph Yirikian (Armenian: Ռալֆ Յիրիկյան; born November 16, 1967) is an Armenian businessman who is the current General Director of Ucom, and was formerly the General Director of VivaCell-MTS (MTS Armenia CJSC), a 2005 startup company which became Armenia's leading telecommunications operator and one of the top taxpayers. As reported, he left the company in 2022 to concentrate on his own business.

== Early life and education ==
Ralph Yirikian was born on November 16, 1967, in Beirut, Lebanon. With his younger twin brothers and sister, he grew up in Beirut. He grew up during the Lebanese Civil War.

Yirikian graduated from the American University of Beirut with a bachelor's degree in economics in 1991. In 1992, he received a second bachelor's degree from the university, this time in business administration.

== Business career ==
From 1991 to 1992, Yirikian worked at AUB's Jafet Library as an assistant in the Archiving and Documentation Department, and later as a computer operator at the Lebanese George Matta Establishment. In 1993, he worked as an executive secretary of Al Maha Group Holdings in Qatar, and as an assistant management consultant at Nasser, Ghattas and Co, in Cyprus.

From 1994 to 1996, Yirikian was the Head of the Administration and Personnel Department at Al Maha Group Holdings. From 1997 to 1999, he was the head of the Administration and Customer Service Department at Nasser, Ghattas and Co. Between 1999 and 2001, Yirikian was the head of the Administrative Unit at the Lebanese telecommunications company LibanCell. From February 2002 till July 2004, he was the General Manager of Karabakh Telecom.

=== General Director at VivaCell-MTS ===
Ralph Yirikian was the VivaCell-MTS General Manager, from November 2004 to June 2022.

VivaCell grew quickly and in 2007, the company's only shareholder, Fattouch Group, agreed to sell 80% of its shares to Mobile TeleSystems PJSC (MTS), the largest mobile operator in the Commonwealth of Independent States and the Russian Federation. As of today, VivaCell-MTS (MTS Armenia CJSC) shareholders are 80% MTS Group (Mobile TeleSystems PJSC) and 20% - Lebanese Fattouche Group. Yirikian stayed as the General Manager of VivaCell-MTS after the acquisition by MTS. He oversaw the company's rollout of the country's first 3G network based on UMTS/HSPA (Universal Mobile Telecommunications System / High Speed Packet Access) technology in Armenia. On December 20, 2010, VivaCell-MTS launched the first 4G/LTE network in Armenia.

=== New culture of management ===
Yirikian described his management style as one in which he urged his employees to take responsibility and make their own decisions.

=== General Director of Ucom ===
In March 2023, Yirikian was appointed the General Director of Ucom.

== List of Scientific degrees, state awards (medals) ==
- Order of Honor from the President of the RA
- Second-class Medal of Services to the Motherland by the decree of the President of Armenia Serzh Sargsyan to Ralph Yirikian
- “Movses Khorenatsi” Medal from the President of the Republic of Armenia.
- Mesrop Mashtots Decoration of Order from the President of the Nagorno-Karabakh Republic
- “Anania Shirakatsi” medal from NKR President
- Marshal Zhukov Decoration of Honor from The Russian Federation President
- Governmental medal of the Russian Federation after Valeri Bryusov
- “Presidency Shield of the Republic of Lebanon” Order awarded by the President of the Republic of Lebanon General Michel Suleiman
- Memorable medal of the RA Prime Minister
- Commemoration Medal from the Prime Minister of the Nagorno-Karabakh Republic to Ralph Yirikian
- “Grigor Lusavorich” decoration of honor from the Catholicos of all Armenians
- Medal of Honor of the National Assembly of RA
- “Garegin Njdeh” decoration of honor from the Minister of Defense of RA
- Mantashyants Diamond Decoration of Honor on behalf of the RA Ministry of Culture and Golden Apricot Film Festival
- Mantashyants Knight Silver Decoration of Honor
- Peter the Great Decoration of Honor of the 1st Degree
- Golden Medal awarded by the Armenian National Olympic Committee
- Mantashyants Knight Golden Decoration of Honor from the Golden Apricot Film Festival
- Diploma on awarding with medal and honorary title of the honored engineer of Russia by the Presidency of the Russian Engineering Academy
- Tigran II Medz Medal
- “Mantashyants Knight” Platinum Medal
- “Hagop Meghapart” medal
- Admiral Isakov Medal from the Ministry of Defense of RA
- “Vazgen Sargsyan” medal of the RA Ministry of Defense
- Medal “20 years of RA Armed Forces” from the RA Ministry of Defense
- “Andranik Ozanyan” medal from the RA Ministry of Defense
- “Drastamat Kanayan” medal from the Ministry of Defense of the Republic of Armenia
- Gold medal of the Ministry of culture of RA
- Diploma and «Grigor Narekatsi» medal from the RA Ministry of Culture
- Golden Medal of the Ministry of Environmental Protection of the RA awarded by the decree of the Minister
- Golden Medal of the Ministry of Education and Science
- Gold Medal of the RA Ministry of Agriculture “For the Development of Agriculture”
- “Poghos Nubar” Medal from the RA Ministry of Diaspora
- Medal of the RA Minister of Transport and Communication
- Gold Medal of the RA Ministry of Sport and Youth Affairs
- “Medal of the Nagorno-Karabakh Republic Defense Army” from the Minister of Defense of the Nagorno-Karabakh Republic
- Police medal in appreciation of cooperation
- Medal “Military Support” from the RA Chief of Police
- “Emblem of Yerevan” Golden Medal awarded by the Major of Yerevan
- Gold Medal of the Mayor of Yerevan
- Ararat region Medal and Certificate
- Golden medal of the National Academy of Sciences of Armenia
- Medal of the Union of Theatrical Actors of Armenia
- “Crusader” Golden Medal from the Council of “Crusader” NGO
- Medal “Devoted to Compassion” awarded by the Board of Trustees of the Armenian Foundation of Fridtjof Nansen
- Medal “Catholicos of All Armenians Vazgen I” awarded by Mashtots educational and cultural foundation
- Gold Medal of the Armenian Genocide Museum-Institute
- Medal of Honor from the World Committee of the Pan-Armenian Games
- Medal “Pilot-Cosmonaut of the USSR, twice Hero of the Soviet Union, Viktor Vasilyevich Gorbatko”
- Golden medal “Arno Babajanian Prize Laureate”
- Gold medal and diploma from the Union of Manufacturers and Businessmen (Employers) of Armenia
- Gold Meal of ArSU
- A medal after Avrora Mardiganyan from the Armenian Genocide Museum-Institute
- “Golden Aragats” medal from the “Eurasia” Charity Public Organization
- Woodrow Wilson Medal of the Fist Order from the Presidium of the National Academy of Sciences of the Western Armenia
- Medal of honorary citizen of Stepanakert city, Nagorno Karabakh
- Medal “The First Cosmonaut of the Earth Yu. A. Gagarin” from the Russian Federation of Cosmonautics
- Armenian Armed Forces Emblem
- Coin of Artashes I from the Minister of Defense of RA
- Title of Honorary Doctor of Goris State University awarded by the Scientific Council
- Title of Honorary Doctor of the Armenian Branch of Russian Academy of Natural Sciences
- Honorary title of Academician of the European Academy of Natural Sciences (Hannover, Germany)
- A degree of Honorable Professor of the Armenian State Institute of Physical Culture, by the decision of the scientific council of the Institute
- Honorary Citizen of Vanadzor
- Ralph Yirikian awarded with the title of “Honorary Citizen of Yerevan” by the decision of Council of Elders of Yerevan
- Title of Honorary citizen of the Nagorno Karabakh Republic Martakert town
- Man of the Year title awarded by the Armenian Bone Marrow Donor Registry Charitable Trust
- Honorary diploma of the Great Friend of the National Center of Oncology
- Title of Honorary Member of the Presidium of the National Academy of Consumers of Armenia
- Award “The National Beacon of Corporate Responsibility” in the frames of the awarding ceremony for the “Best Brand of the Year”
- “Person of the year” award in the category of “Voluntary Community Work” from the London Board of Trustees of Tekeyan Cultural Union
- Award “Friend of TV”
- “Award for creating appropriate working conditions for disabled people and for employing them” from Mission East and Huysi Kamurj (Bridge of Hope) NGOs, and the RA Ministry of Labor and Social Affairs
- Certificate “Best Customer Experience” from the National Association of Consumers
- Winner in the “Best public figure of the Year” nomination, “AS” awarding ceremony, ‘Analitika’ Center
- “Mercury” award according to the decision of the Chamber of Commerce and Industry of the Republic of Armenia
- “Business Personality of the Year” Award to Ralph Yirikian (3-rd Armenian Trade Network Awards Ceremony)
- “Business Leadership Award” established by the American University of Armenia School of Business and Management
- Certificate of honorary citizen of Shushi city, Nagorno Karabakh
- Certificate of honorary citizen of Yeghegnadzor city, Vayots Dzor region
- Certificate of honorary citizen of Urtsadzor, Ararat region
- Certificate of honorary citizen of Zovaber, Gegharkunik region
- Certificate of honorary citizen of Dilijan city, Tavush region
- Certificate of honorary citizen of Movses, Tavush region
- Certificate awarded by the Armenian Astronomical Society for outstanding support to astronomy. The certificate is awarded in the frame of the International Year of Astronomy
- Certificate awarded by “Iravunk” newspaper as the best business figure in Armenia, awarded for considerable contribution to the development of the sphere of communication in Armenia
- Environmental Merit Award from World Land Trust
- Special certificate from the National Association of Consumers
- Certificate of honorary citizen of Yeghegnadzor city, Vayots Dzor region
- Special certificate of excellence from Logos EXPO, in recognition of high-quality services rendered to the population of Armenia
- Certificate “Advocate of the HIV/AIDS issue from the Advocacy Group on AIDS
- "Philanthropist of the Year" certificate, political-social award "AS"
- Certificate by the International Informatization Academy, Montreal Headquarters, Canada (in General Consultative Status with Economic and Social Council of the United Nations), to Ralph Yirikian – the Honorary Member of the Academy, to remain in good standing by fulfilling the responsibilities of membership
- Diploma of Foreign Member of the Russian Academy of Engineering
- Honorary Diploma to Ralph Yirikian from the President of the Russian Federation’s International Academy of Engineering B. V. Gusev
- Gratitude award for the donation to the Museum-Institute of the Armenian Genocide
- Certificate of recognition from The International Union for Conservation of Nature, National Committee of the Netherlands (IUCN NL)
- Certificate from Foundation for Preservation of Wildlife and Cultural Assets (FPWC)

== Family ==
Ralph Yirikian is married and has one daughter and one son.

== Filmography ==
As himself
Year	Title	Notes
2017	Nice Evening (Լավ Երեկո)	Special guest
