= Alis Kaplandjyan =

Armenian actress

Alis Kaplandjyan/Ալիս Կապլանջյան
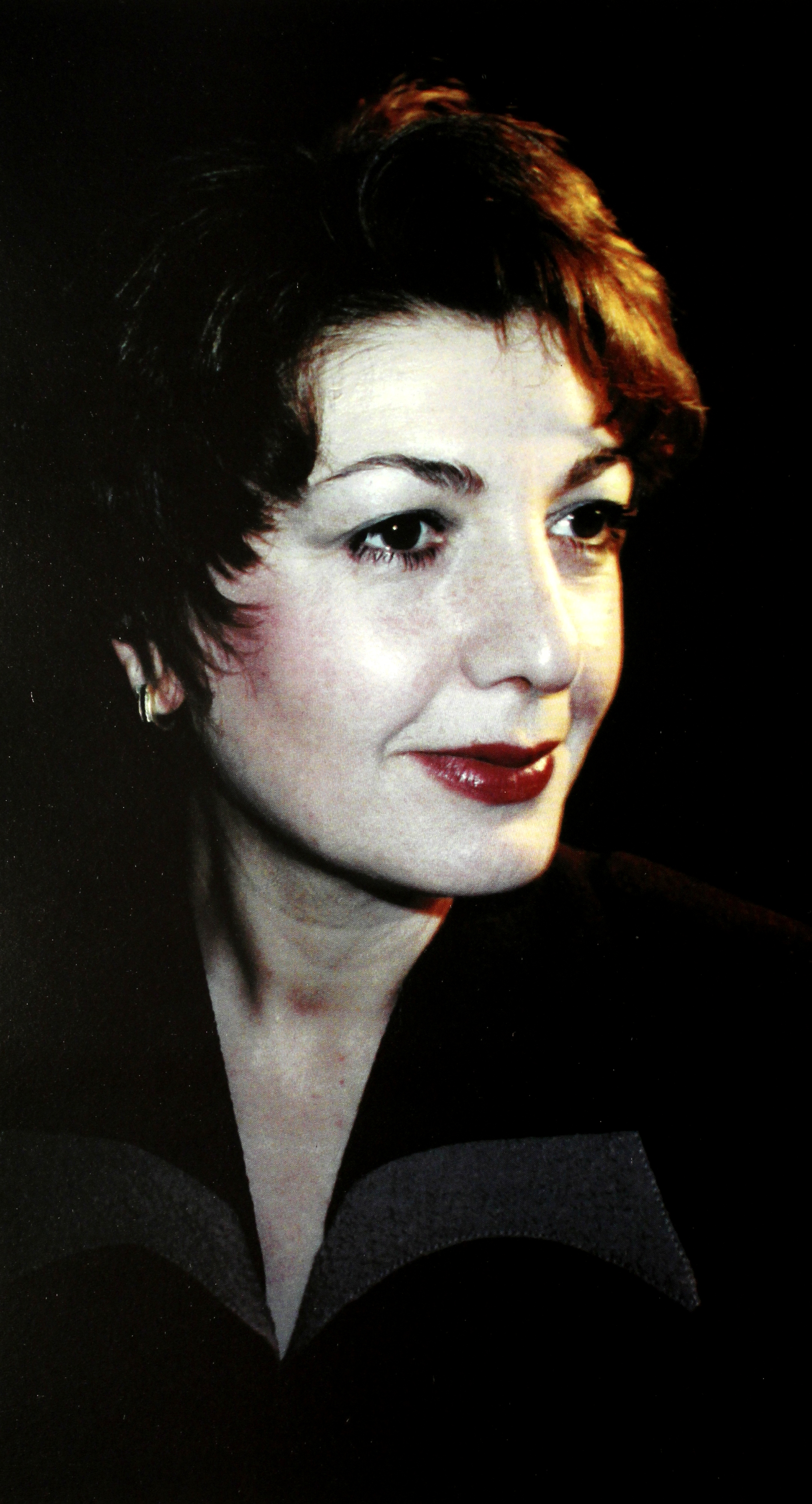
- Born: Alis Kaplandjyan/Ալիս Կապլանջյան; December 1, 1951 (age 73)
- Education: Yerevan State Institute of Fine Arts and Theater
- Occupation: Actress
- Years active: 1977–present
- Spouse: Aleqsandr Khachatryan

Alis Kaplandjyan (Armenian: Ալիս Կապլանջյան, born December 1, 1952), is an Armenian actress.

== Biography ==
Alis Kaplandjyan was born in Yerevan. Between 1969 and 1973 she studied at the Yerevan Fine Arts and Theater Institute. From 1973 to 1991 she was involved as an actress at Sundukyan National Academic Theater in Yerevan. During that time, she played many roles in the theater and at the same time starred in more than 10 films at Hayfilm Studio.

== Filmography ==
Film
Year	Title	Armenian title	Role
1977	Revolutionary Committee Chairman	Հեղկոմի նախագահը	
1977	"Bow for the day coming"	Խոնարհվիր վաղվա օրվան	
1978	"Star of hope"	Հուսո աստղ	episod
1979	"Blue Mavrikie"	Կապույտ Մավրիկի	artist
1977	"Revolutionary Committee Chairman"	Հեղկոմի նախագահ	
1984	"The horseman whom they were waiting for"	Հեծյալը, որին սպասում էին	Madam Shahverdyan
1986	"As long as we live ..."	Քանի դեռ ապրում ենք...	
1987	"Way to David of Sasun"	Ճանապարհ դեպի Սասունցի Դավիթ	Arus
2002	"Alicia"	Ալիսիա	Mariam

Television and web
Year	Title	Armenian title	Role
2010	Return	Վերադարձ	
2009	Price of life	Կյանքի գինը	
2012	American History	Ամերիկյան պատմություն	
