= Purgatoire =

Purgatoire means purgatory in French. It may refer to:

- Purgatoire River, a river in southeastern Colorado, United States
- Purgatoire Formation, a geological unit named for the river
- Purgatoire River track site, a significant preservation of dinosaur trackways

== See also ==
- Purgatory (disambiguation)
- Purgatorio (disambiguation)
