= Aleksandr Khachatryan =

Armenian actor

Aleqsandr Khachatryan/Ալեքսանդր Խաչատրյան
- Born: Aleqsandr Khachatryan/Ալեքսանդր Խաչատրյան; November 7, 1947 (age 79); Yerevan, Armenian SSR, Soviet Union
- Education: Sundukyan State Academic Theatre
- Occupation: Actor
- Years active: 1973–present
- Spouse: Alis Kaplandjyan

Aleksandr Khachatryan (Armenian: Ալեքսանդր Խաչատրյան; born November 7, 1947), is an Armenian actor. He is known for his role on The Leaders.

== Film studios ==
Aleksandr Khachatryan has acted in many films of Film studios of the Soviet Union.

- Armenfilm
- Mosfilm
- Lenfilm
- Belarusfilm
- Tajikfilm

== Filmography ==
Film
| Year | Title | Role | Notes |
|---|---|---|---|
| 1973 | The Cliff (Ժայռ) | Alexander | |
| 1974 | "Canyon of the abandoned tales" (Լքված հեքիաթների կիրճը) | —N/a | |
| 1974 | "Solid rock" (Կարծր ապար) | —N/a | |
| 1976 | "Baghdasar divorces from His Wife " (Բաղդասարը բաժանվում է կնոջից) | Kipar | |
| 1977 | "Revolutionary Committee Chairman" (Հեղկոմի նախագահ) | —N/a | |
| 1977 | "Forefather" (Նահապետ) | —N/a | |
| 1983 | "The boss" (Տերը) | —N/a | |
| 1985 | "An Apple Garden" (Խնձորի այգին) | Artush | |
| 1987 | "Commander Mkhitar" (Մխիթար Սպարապետ) | —N/a | |
| 1987 | "At the bottom" (Հատակում) | —N/a | |
| 1987 | "Way to David of Sasun" (Ճանապարհ դեպի Սասունցի Դավիթ) | —N/a | |
| 2008 | "Hollywood Confidential" | Alex Popov | |
| 2014 | "Our heart's home" (Մեր սրտի տնակը) | —N/a | |
| 2016 | "The Last Inhabitant" | —N/a | |
| 2025 | In the Land of Arto | | Le Pays d'Arto. It will open Locarno on 6 August. |

Television and web
| Year | Title | Role | Notes |
|---|---|---|---|
| 2009 | Price of life | —N/a | |
| 2010 | Return | —N/a | Recurring Role |
| 2012-2013 | American history | —N/a | Main Role |
| 2015–present | The Leaders (Armenian TV series) | —N/a | Main Role |
