= Apaga, Armenia =

Village in Armavir, Armenia

Apaga Ապագա
- Location within Armenia
- Coordinates: 40°05′46″N 44°15′04″E
- Country: Armenia
- Marz (Province): Armavir

Area
  - Total: 8.27 km^{2} (3.19 sq mi)
- Elevation: 820 m (2,690 ft)

Population (2011)
  - Total: 1,853
  - Density: 224/km^{2} (580/sq mi)
- Demonym: Apagetsi
- Time zone: UTC+4 ( )
  - Summer (DST): UTC+5 ( )
- Postal code: 1117
- Area code: +374 (23)

Apaga (Armenian: Ապագա, lit. 'future'; until 1935, Verin Turkmenlu) is a town in the Armavir Province of Armenia.

== Notable people ==
- Ruben Muradyan, Armenian ballet dancer, presenter and actor

== See also ==
- Armavir Province
