= Ucom =

Telecommunication company in Armenia

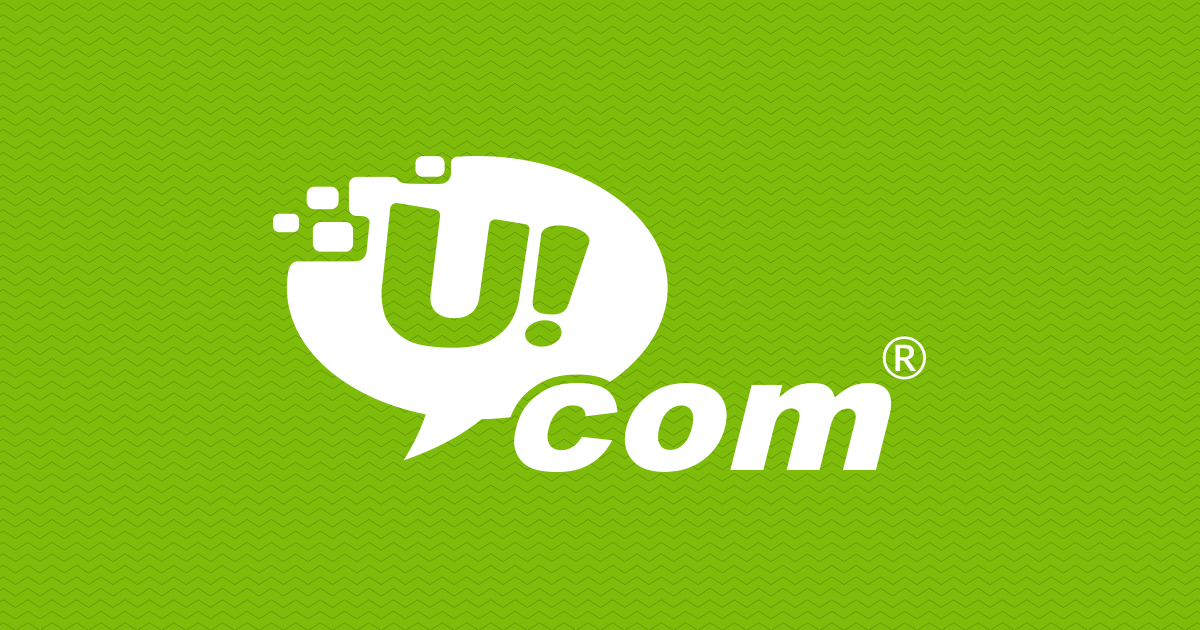
- Industry: Telecommunications
- Founded: 2009
- Founder: Hayk Yesayan
- Headquarters: Yerevan, Armenia
- Area served: Armenia
- Services: Fixed Line, Mobile Telephony, Cable television, and Broadband
- Owner: Ucom
- Website: www.ucom.am

Ucom is a mobile network operator and internet service provider in Armenia.

== History ==
Ucom was founded in 2009. Ucom provides its Internet services through its own fiber-optic channel connecting Armenia with Georgia. This allows the company to provide transit internet to the Middle East.

In 2013, the company received a license to provide public mobile internet services, and in 2015 acquired a 100% stake in Orange Armenia, thus entering the Armenian mobile market. Following this, the company launched the 4G+ network in Armenia, which acted as a supplement to the company's combined services, providing customers with the complete "4 in 1" package of IPTV, fixed and mobile phone services, and internet service.

In 2017, during the Customer Advisory Board meeting that took place in San Francisco at the initiative of Calix, Ucom and Calix announced the introduction of NG-PON2 (New Generation Passive Optical Network) technology in Armenia, which would enable Ucom to upgrade the bandwidth speed from 1 gigabit/sec in its fixed network to 10 gigabits/sec. With the construction of the NG-PON2 network, it was possible to provide higher quality services, speed, security and new services.

In April 2017, Ucom and FORA-BANK Joint-Stock Commercial Bank (part of Tashir Group) signed a partnership agreement for projects including the full range of telecommunications services, covering the entire territory of Armenia as well as its most remote regions. The implementation of the investment program defined by the agreement allowed expanding 4Play offers and 4G+ network in the country. Future plans include expansion of operations, especially in Russia, which would allow Ucom to become a leading pan-Armenian telecommunications operator.

Ucom has also been active in the field of corporate social responsibility, implementing a number of programs aimed at the development of children, particularly in the sphere of education. With the support of the company, computer engineering laboratories were opened in some Armenian schools, promoting the development of the ICT sector. The company also supports vulnerable groups in society by continuing to implement the "Let's Keep Children in Families" SMS charity project, which provides families with resources that allow parents to create a stable source of income and release their children from the care of state institutions. The company also implements the "Bringing Sight to Armenian Eyes" program, within the framework of which quality ophthalmological services are provided to the regional residents of Armenia free of charge.

== Labour strike ==
On April 9, 2020, a publication with the title "BREAKING. Ucom management staff resign" appeared in the press and quickly spread throughout the Armenian network. According to the publication, the entire management of Ucom as well as the entire technical staff (around five dozen) had resigned.

=== Cause of controversy ===
According to several media reports, the controversy was caused by a confrontation between Ucom's 3.17% shareholder and at the time Director General Hayk Yesayan and the rest of the Ucom shareholders, the complete and detailed list of which is publicly available since 2019 via Ucom Prospectus.

At the Board of Directors’ meeting held on April 14, 2020, the head of the executive organ was changed 1, and Ara Sergei Khachatryan was appointed Director General. He was registered as Director at “Ucom” CJSC in the Agency of the State Register of Legal Entities of the RA Ministry of Justice.

No quantitative changes have taken place both in the shares and shareholders of “Ucom” CJSC. Around 500 employees including top and mid-level management of the “Ucom” CJSC submitted dismissal applications, but at the crisis management skills and efforts of the newly appointed Director General, most of staff returned to regular execution of their job responsibilities.

=== Further developments ===
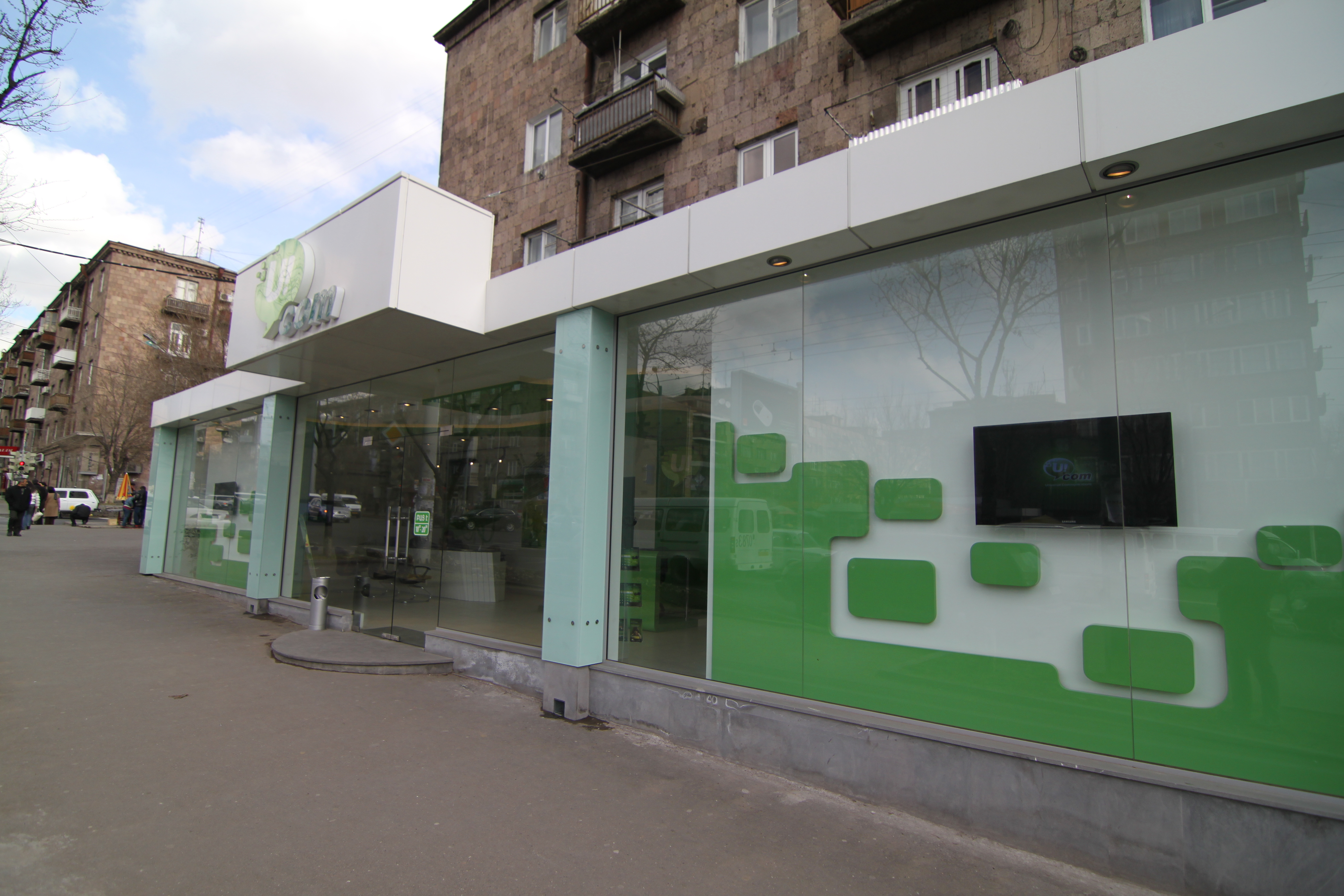
A Ucom store in Yerevan

Hayk and Alexander Yesayan announced that they have no intention to sell their share of the company and have intentions to purchase the other 94% of the company shares, for which they offered around US$17 million. The Board of Directors did not respond to the offer.

As of May 14, 2020, 1160 Ucom employees kept on ensuring company's regular operations as far as in addition to their duties they have temporarily taken over the functions of the colleagues resigned. In total, 520 employees specialized in different areas have resigned as per their own application, the retention process for many of them was underway at the time. Business processes were optimized, the preference was given to the internal resources and employees were promoted internally while being entrusted the positions of the heads of various departments, senior specialists and coordinators.2

== Staff ==
=== Current ===
- Gurgen Khachatryan – chairman of the Board of Directors
- Ralph Yirikian – Director General
- Arina Arustamyan - Commercial Director

=== Previous ===
- Hayk Yesayan – Director General
- Alexandr Yesayan – Deputy Director General, Head of Development
- Aram Barseghyan – Commercial Director
- Karen Shaboyan – Head of Sales

== See also ==
- List of mobile network operators in Europe
