= Purgatorio (disambiguation) =

Purgatorio is the second part of Dante's Divine Comedy. It may also refer to:

- Purgatorio (album), 2004 Tangerine Dream album
- The third movement of Gustav Mahler's Symphony No. 10 (Mahler), left incomplete at the time of his death.

== See also ==
- Purgatory (disambiguation)
- Purgatoire (disambiguation)
