= Levon Harutyunyan =

- Born: Levon Vrami Harutyunyan; 13 December 1927; Tovuz, Soviet Armenia
- Died: 2007 (aged 79–80); Yerevan, Armenia
- Occupations: Biologist, professor, writer, journalist

Levon Vrami Harutyunyan (Armenian: Լևոն Վռամի Հարությունյան; 13 December 1927 – 2007) was an Armenian biologist, University Professor, journalist, publicist, writer and science populariser, founder of Yerevan Haybusak University. Established in 1990, the Haybusak University became one of the first private universities in Armenia. He received numerous decorations for his work including Anania Shirakatsi medal from the President of Armenia.

== Life and career ==
Levon Vrami Harutyunyan was born 13 December 1927 in the village of Tovuz in the Tavush Province of Soviet Armenia.

Harutyunyan studied and graduated from the Armenian Agricultural Institute (now known as Armenian National Agrarian University) in 1953. From 1956 to 1978, Harutyunyan worked at the National Academy of Sciences under its botany department. Meanwhile, in 1971, he became a member of the Union of Journalists of Armenia. In 1990, he founded the Yerevan "Haybusak" Institute (now Yerevan "2Haybusak" University) upon which he became leading rector. Thereafter, in 1994, he became the president of the scientific-educational association "Harutyun". In 1995, Harutyunyan became the head chairman of Biology and Biology Teaching Methods at the Yerevan State Pedagogical University. In 2006, he was nominated as the President of International Academy of Education. He was the head of the department of science within the academy.

"I've done what I could. Let others do even more so."

— Levon Harutyunyan

Harutyunyan authored more than 400 research papers, about 400 essays, non-scientific journal articles, over 50 monographs, handbooks, method manuals and dictionaries. His notable publications (via Haybusak University Press) include Phytotherapy, Entertaining Botany, A Journey to the Hiding Places of Nature, The Nature of Armenia and Ways of its Preservation and Enrichment, and The Gardener's Encyclopaedia. He was involved with the landscaping of Yerevan and has authored several books on landscape preservation.

== Family ==
Harutyunyan and his wife Silva Aslikian had two daughters (Anahit and Anna) and one son (Suren).

== Awards and titles ==
Among some of Harutyunyan's awards and titles include:

- 2007 – Member of International Informatization Academy (www.iia.ca)
- 2003 – Anania Shirakatsi Gold Medal awarded by the President of RA
- 2002 – Member of International Pedagogical Academy
- 1983 – Award by State TV and Radio Emissions Committee. Award by the Republican Nature Preservation Council
- 1983 – Title of Professor
- 1971 – Member of the Union of Journalists of Armenia
- 1970 – Doctor of Biology thesis defense
- 1961 – PhD thesis defense

== Publications ==
Some of his publications include:

- "Hayastani Dendrofloran". Yerevan. 1985. Luis hratarakchutyun (in Armenian)
- "Partizagortsi hanragitaran". Nahapet hrat. Haybusak hratarak. Yerevan 2005 (in Armenian)
- "Arcaxi Floran". Yerevan, 2007, Nahapet hrat (in Armenian)
