= Aida Babajanyan =

Armenian-Georgian actress and dancer (born 1958)

- Born: Aida Babajanyan; December 22, 1958 (age 67); Akhaltsikhe, Samtskhe-Javakheti, Georgian SSR, Soviet Union
- Occupations: Actress, dancer
- Years active: 1998–present

Aida Babajanyan (Armenian: Աիդա Բաբաջանյան, born December 22, 1958), is an Armenian actress and dancer who was born in the Georgia SSR. She is known for her roles on Own Enemy, and on The Leaders.

== Filmography ==
Film
Year	Title	Role	Notes
2007	Psikhopat	—N/a	
2007	"Return of immoral son"	—N/a	

Television and web
Year	Title	Role	Notes
2008	Unhappy happiness	—N/a	Main Role
2008-2009	Vorogayt 1 (Trapped)	—N/a	Recurring Role
2009-2010	Vorogayt 2 (Trapped)	—N/a	Recurring Role
2010	Masquerade	—N/a	Recurring Role
2010-2012	Hard Life	—N/a	Main Role
2013-2015	Own Enemy	—N/a	Main Role (504 episodes)
2015–present	The Leaders (Armenian TV series)	—N/a	Main Role
