= Change (Armenian TV series) =

- Չեյնջ
- Genre: sitcom
- Starring: Hovhannes Azoyan; Armen Margaryan; Artur Nalbandyan; Aleksandra Samolienko; Mariam Melikyan; Ani Kocharyan; Lilit Haroyan; Ani Petrosyan; Seiran Navikyan
- Country of origin: Armenia
- Original language: Armenian
- No. of seasons: 2
- No. of episodes: 48

Production
- Production locations: Yerevan, Armenia
- Running time: 29-32 minutes

Original release
- Network: Armenia Premium
- Release: November 1, 2016 – June 22, 2017

Change is an Armenian sitcom television series. The series premiered on Armenia Premium on November 1, 2016. Since then, the series has aired on Tuesdays and Thursdays at 21:00. The last episode aired on June 22, 2017.

The series took place in Yerevan, Armenia.
