= Nice Evening =

- Genre: talk show
- Written by: Robert Martirosyan; Van Grigoryan; Gurgen Mnatsakanyan
- Directed by: Arman Sargsyan
- Creative director: Arman Sargsyan
- Presented by: Aram MP3; Garik Papoyan
- Country of origin: Armenia
- Original language: Armenian

Production
- Producer: Arman Mitoyan
- Cinematography: Karen Stephanyan
- Editor: Shahen Sardaryan
- Running time: 39-42 minutes

Original release
- Network: Armenia 1
- Release: October 27, 2017 – December 31, 2019

Nice Evening (Armenian: Լավ Երեկո) is an Armenian late night talk show hosted by Aram MP3 and Garik Papoyan. The series premiered on Armenia 1 on October 27, 2017 and ended on December 31, 2019. The series aired on Fridays at 21:35. It was generally structured around humorous monologues about the day's news, guest interviews, comedy sketches and music performances. Guests of the show included Marcus Miller, Nikol Pashinyan, Hovhannes Azoyan, Hayk Marutyan, Sebu Simonian, Arto Tunçboyacıyan, Nazeni Hovhannisyan, and Ralph Yirikian.

== Notable episodes ==
=== Episode 1 ===
The episode aired on October 27, 2017. Guests of the show were Armenian actor and producer Hayk Marutyan and Armenia's honored artist Sergey Armen Smbatyan. The episode has approximately 625,000 views on YouTube.

=== Episode 2 ===
The episode aired on November 3, 2017. Guests of the show were Armenian politician, journalist, eventual Prime Minister Nikol Pashinyan and American jazz composer Marcus Miller. The episode has approximately 753,000 views on YouTube.

=== Episode 3 ===
The episode aired on November 10, 2017. Guests of the show were former minister of education and science Armen Ashotyan and Armenian actor Hovhannes Azoyan. The episode has approximately 606,000 views on YouTube.

=== Episode 4 ===
The episode aired on November 17, 2017. Guests of the show were Russian singer Yelena Yesenina and Armenian-American singer, songwriter Sebu Simonian. The episode has approximately 349,000 views on YouTube.

=== Episode 5 ===
The episode aired on November 24, 2017. Guests of the show were Armenian musician Arto Tunçboyacıyan and Armenian-American singer, songwriter Armen Abgar Muradyan. The episode has approximately 253,000 views on YouTube.

=== Episode 6 ===
The episode aired on December 1, 2017. Guests of the show were Armenian presenter Nazeni Hovhannisyan and Armenian manager Ralph Yirikian. The episode has approximately 664,000 views on YouTube.

=== Episode 7 ===
The episode aired on December 8, 2017. Guests of the show were Armenian singer-politician Shushan Petrosyan and three-time former world champion Arthur Abraham. The episode has approximately 454,000 views on YouTube.

=== Episode 8 ===
The episode aired on December 15, 2017. Guests of the show were Armenian gynecologist Georgi Poghosyan and Georgian singer Dato Khujadze. The episode has approximately 307,000 views on YouTube.
