= Lika Salmanyan =

Armenian actress

- Լիկա Սալմանյան
- Born: Lika Salmanyan Լիկա Սալմանյան; 1997 (age 27–28); Yerevan, Armenian SSR, Soviet Union
- Education: Yerevan State Institute of Theatre and Cinematography
- Occupation: Actress
- Years active: 2012–present

Lika Salmanyan (Armenian: Լիկա Սալմանյան), is an Armenian actress. She is known for her recurring role as Anoushik on 3D Love and Emka on Own Enemies.

== Filmography ==
Television and web
Year	Title	Role	Notes
2012–2013	3D Love	Anoushik	Recurring cast
2013 – March 30, 2015	Own Enemy	Emily (Emka)	Main cast (504 episodes)
2015	Domino (Armenian TV series)	Lilit	Recurring cast (season 1)
2016-2017	Ancient Kings		Recurring cast
