= Lilit Haroyan =

Armenian actress (born 1990)

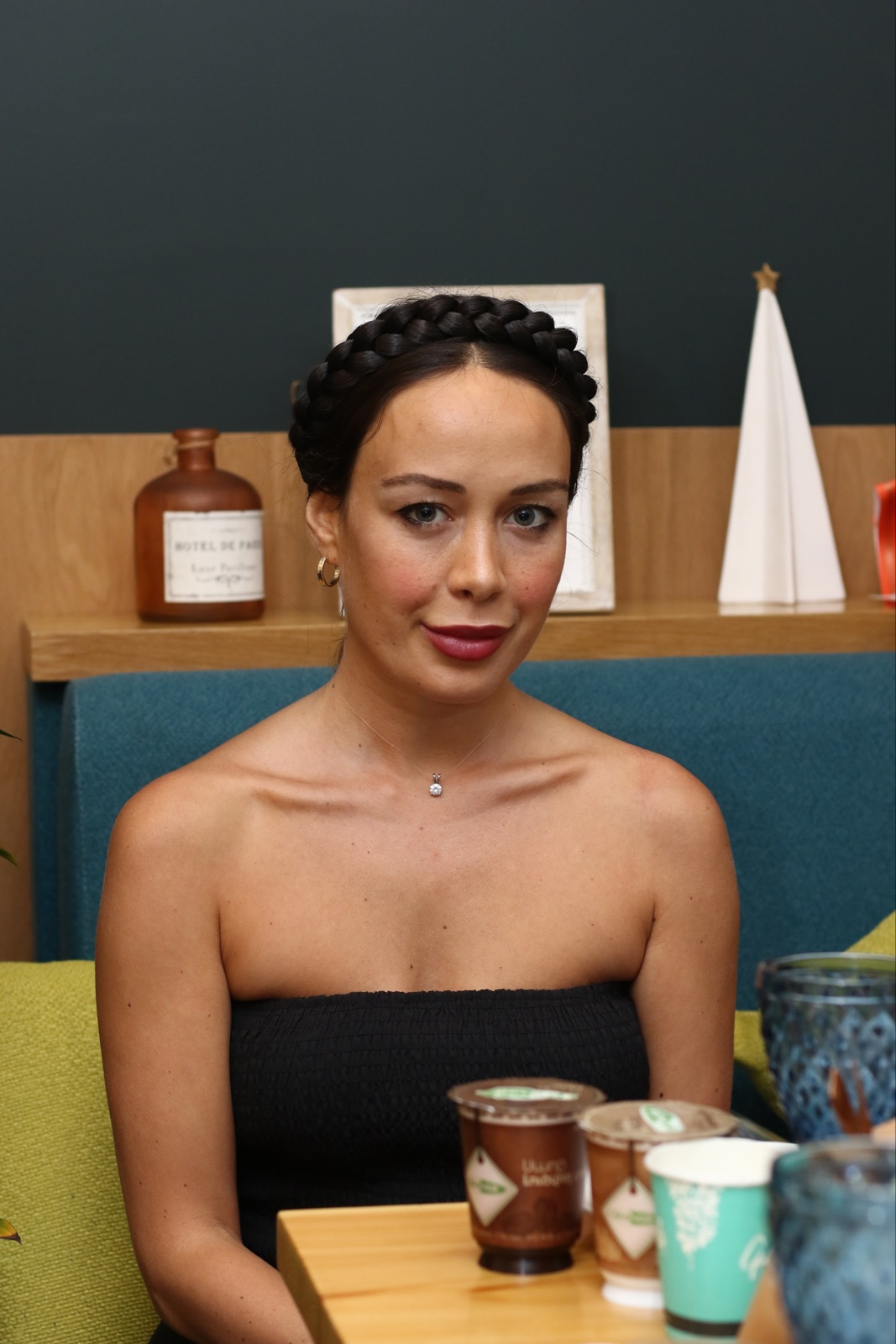
- Lilit Haroyan
- Born: 12 April 1990 (age 36); Yerevan, Armenia (Armenian SSR)
- Education: Yerevan State University
- Occupation: Actress
- Years active: 2016–present
- Known for: Full House

Lilit Haroyan (Armenian: Լիլիթ Հարոյան; born 12 April 1990) is an Armenian actress, television presenter, psychologist and yoga international trainer. She is best known for her role as Eva on TV-series Full House

== Career ==
=== Yoga ===
Lilit Haroyan started practicing yoga in 2012, attending "Luys" (Light) yoga studio. Along with her studies, she worked as a yoga teacher in the same studio. In parallel with the work, she passed various yoga trainings. Lilit became an International Yoga Teacher in 2015, studying at the Armenian Yoga Federation school, Kashmir Shaivism Yoga School in India (teacher: Amit Raina).

=== Psychologist ===
After graduating from the university in 2015, she founded the Aura psychological center, which offers a number of psychological services and trainings.

=== Host ===
Lilit Haroyan has been a presenter since 2011, hosting Bari Luys, Hayer (Good Morning Armenians) program on Armenia TV. In 2017, she hosted Aravot TV program on "A-TV". Since March 1, 2021, she has been running the Yoga page of the Bari Luys, Hayer program on Armenia TV.

=== Actress ===
Lilit Haroyan started her acting career in 2015, starring in the second season of the Full House comedy project (she played the role of Eva). In 2016–2017, she starred in the TV series Change as Flora. In 2017, the actress played the role of Katerina in the TV series Qavaran (Purgatory). In 2021, she starred in the sitcom Fake Papa as a yoga teacher.
