= The Leaders (TV series) =

Armenian television series

- Առաջնորդները
- Genre: Drama; Romance
- Developed by: Diana Grigoryan
- Starring: Diana Grigoryan; Karen Aslanyan; Aida Babajanyan; Janna Butulyan; Ara Deghtrikyan; Aleqsandr Khachatryan; Meri Makaryan; David Tadevosyan; Albert Safaryan; Narine Dilanyan; Stephan Ghambaryan; Narine Dilanyan
- Country of origin: Armenia
- Original language: Armenian
- No. of seasons: 1
- No. of episodes: 227

Production
- Producer: Diana Grigoryan
- Production locations: Yerevan, Armenia
- Running time: 40 minutes

Original release
- Network: Armenia TV
- Release: September 21, 2015

The Leaders is an Armenian romantic drama television series. The series premiered on Panarmenian TV on September 21, 2015. The TV series has also aired in Kazakhstan. The series takes place in Yerevan, Armenia.
