= Kargin Serial =

- Also known as: Կարգին սերիալ
- Genre: Comedy
- Directed by: Hrant Avetisyan
- Starring: Hayk Marutyan; Mkrtich Arzumanyan; Areg Galoyan
- Composer: APRICOTA
- Country of origin: Armenia
- Original language: Armenian
- No. of seasons: 6
- No. of episodes: 145

Production
- Executive producer: Arman Marutyan
- Cinematography: HayFilm
- Camera setup: Film; Multi-camera
- Running time: 25 minutes
- Production companies: Kargin Studio, Sahakyants Animation Studio

Original release
- Network: Armenia TV
- Release: October 12, 2010 – June 16, 2013

Kargin Serial (Armenian: Կարգին սերիալ; Good Show) is an Armenian sitcom which aired on the Armenia TV channel from October 2010 to June 2013.

== Plot ==
Sitcom is revolved around live of Karagyozyans brothers, Vardan (Hayk Marutyan) and Arkady (Mkrtich Arzumanyan) and the latter's son Aramik (Areg Galoyan). Vardan is a bachelor who sells houses under classical piano music for a living, by the way leading a hedonic lifestyle. When Adik's wife Nona (Angela Sargsyan) decided to divorce him, she kicked him out of house, as a result of which Adik comes to Vardan's house in despair. Periodically, the two brothers' mother Seda (Arshaluys Avetisyan) visits to the Vardan, who always justifies visits when dealing with the neighboring building. Cleaning in Vardan's apartment is provided by Jemma (Zhenya Mkrtumyan), a cleaner with a criminal past, known by the nickname "The Destroyer".

In the third season, Adik decides to open its own communistic party under name "Young Socialist International Marxists" for coming elections, and appears on a political show, after which Vardan decides to force him to close it. After explaining Vardan that party was opened for getting reasonable amount of money from European Communist parties, they engage new members to join it. But soon after a vice-minister Karlen Karlenich (Mkrtich Arzumanyan) wins in the elections, and the funding money is donated into Seda's "Dim Green" party, estimated as €50,000.

In the fourth season, Vardan makes a permanent girlfriend Monica (Rippi), whom he wants to marry. During the latter's stay in his house, he regularly tortures Arkady and plots against him, regularly cheating on Vardan with his lover. However, in the end, Seda and Arkady expose her, and suddenly it turns out that she is pregnant.

The fifth season begins with Adik's release from prison, where he gained fame after saving the life of the "Punisher" from Shengavit. First 16 episodes he lives with Georgy Mirzoyan (Hovhannes Azoyan) in Vardan's house, then Vardan returns from the US, after receiving his apartment back through his casino.

In the sixth season, Vardan buys a restaurant near their house and hires Arkady to work there for 0 drams. In the process, Emmanuella (Anna Babayan) is accepted there, and Adik falls in love with her. Later it turns out that she is the daughter of the wealthy Ashot Ter-Abrahamyan (Sergey Magalyan). In the end, Arkady receives an inheritance of $2 million and marries Emmanuella.

== Series overview ==
Season	Episodes	Originally released	
Season	Episodes	First released	Last released
1	32	October 12, 2010	December 30, 2010
2	26	March 15, 2011	July 7, 2011
3	9	December 21, 2011	January 24, 2012
4	30	March 14, 2012	June 10, 2012
5	24	October 14, 2012	January 5, 2013
6	24	March 17, 2013	June 16, 2013

== Cast ==
=== Main cast ===
- Hayk Marutyan as Vardan, a bachelor, home broker, dangler.
- Mkrtich Arzumanyan as Adik, Vardan's brother, a male nurse with extremely low wage and lives off his brother in his house.
- Arshaluys Avetisyan as Seda, mother of Vardan and Adik, has been married 4 times.
- Areg Galoyan as Aramik, Adik's son, a student.
- Zhenya Mkrtumyan as Jemma, Vardan's maid with a criminal past.
- Andranik Harutyunyan as Halal, Vardan's friend, lives in the same district.
- Rafael Yeranosyan as Zulal, Vardan's other friend, and best friend of Halal, lives in the same district.
- Anna Babayan as Emmanuella (Eva), Adik's new wife
- Karen Mirijanyan as Shahen Liparitovich, Seda's former husband, doctor

=== Recurring characters ===
- Rippi as Monika, Vardan's ex-wife (on Season four, main cast, on Season five, recurring character).
- Hasmik Gharibyan as Sofa, a crazy young lady, Vardan's girlfriend (on Season one and two, main cast, on Season five, recurring character).
- Angela Sargsyan as Nona, Adik's ex-wife (on Season one and two).
- Hovhannes Azoyan as Georgi Mirzoyan, philosophy doctor (season five)
- Sergey Magalyan as Ashot Ter Abrahamyan, Evas (Emanuella) father (season six)

== Comparison and similar shows ==
Many people have found similarities between Kargin Serial and an American sitcom Two and a Half Men. In an interview, Mkrtich Arzumanyan has accepted that Kargin Serial's format is based on another television show, but also added that it is adapted to Armenian reality.
