= Own Enemy =

- Հարազատ Թշնամի
- Genre: drama; Romance
- Starring: Guj Manukyan; Sargis Hakobyan; Spartak Patvakanyan; Tatevik Adumyan; Irina Harutyunyan; Aram Hovhannisyan; Janna Butulyan; Davit Mardyan; Luiza Ghambaryan; Aida Babajanyan; Anush Margaryan; Hayk Chomoyan; Lika Salmanyan; Davit Tadevosyan
- Country of origin: Armenia
- Original language: Armenian
- No. of seasons: 1
- No. of episodes: 504

Production
- Production locations: Yerevan, Armenia
- Running time: 35-40 minutes

Original release
- Network: Armenia TV
- Release: 2013 – March 30, 2015

Own Enemy is an Armenian romantic drama television series. The series premiered on Armenia TV on 2013. The series takes place in Yerevan, Armenia.

== Premise ==
TV series about human destiny, friends that became enemies and about their descendants. Due to cases and events in the background people may become friends and enemies. Enemies, who share bread together, but deep inside they are evil and tactical. A person can't control the time., but each of us is mighty to fight against the evil.
