= Purgatory Conglomerate =

Geologic formation in Rhode Island

- Stratigraphic range: Carboniferous (Pennsylvanian)
- Type: Formation
- Unit of: Narragansett Bay Group; Informal: Rhode Island Group (RI)

Lithology
- Primary: "near metamorphic" conglomerate

Location
- Region: New England (Rhode Island)
- Country: United States

Type section
- Named for: Purgatory, Middletown, Newport, RI

Dating to the Carboniferous period, the Purgatory Conglomerate is a geologic formation in Rhode Island.

== Purgatory Chasm ==
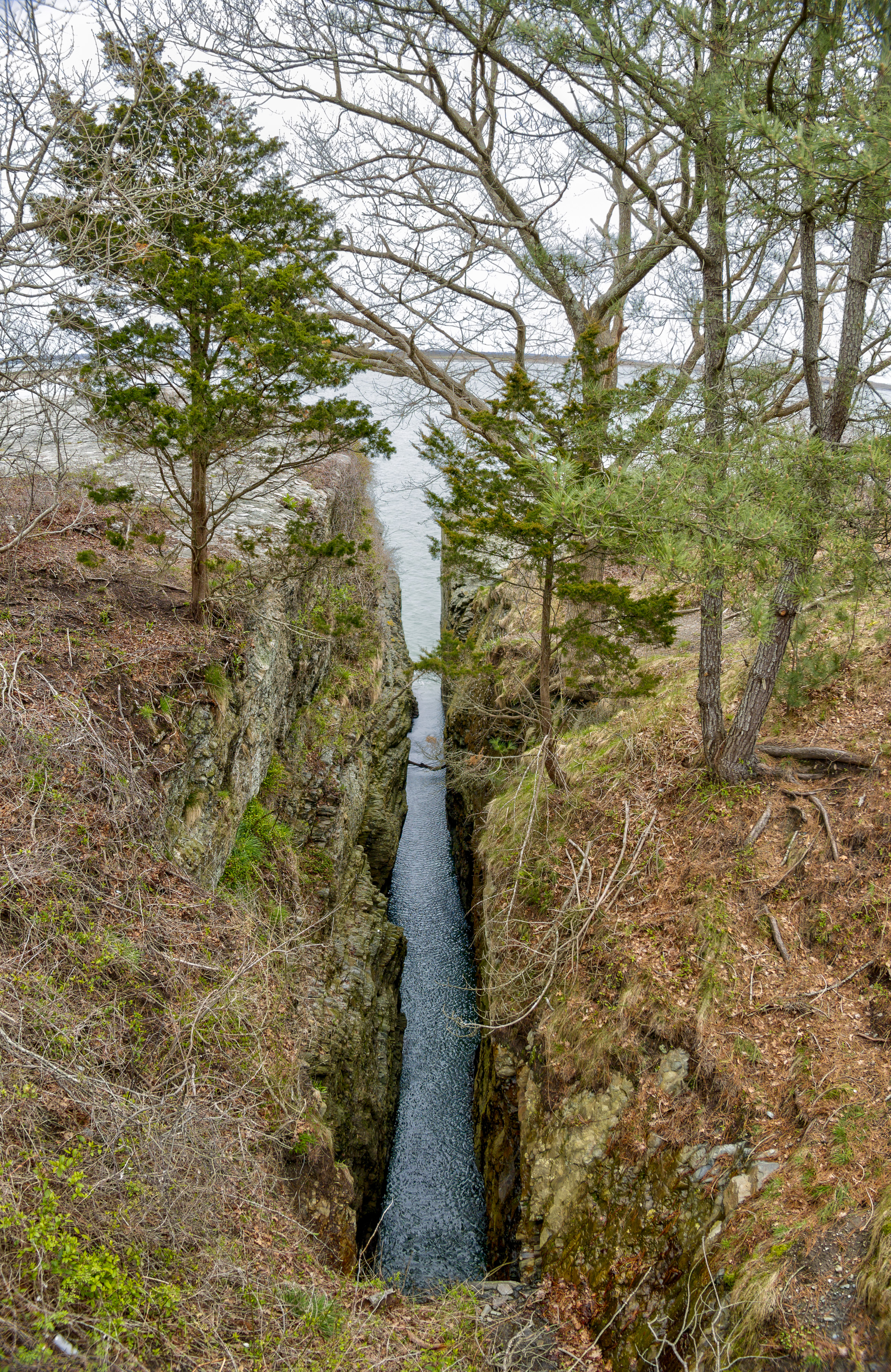
Purgatory Chasm in Middletown

Purgatory Chasm, at the intersection of Tuckerman Avenue and Purgatory Road in Middletown (often mis-identified as being in Newport), is a narrow cleft on the east side of Easton Point which splits the Purgatory Conglomerate in a dramatic fashion. The chasm is 120 feet long, 10 feet wide at the top, and over 150 feet deep.
