= Apricot Groves =

2016 Armenian-Iranian film

- Directed by: Pouria Heidary Oureh
- Written by: Pouria Heidary Oureh
- Produced by: Shirin Fashandi; Farid Ghazinia; Babak Hamidian; Pouria Heidary Oureh; Tabassom Heidary; Pardis Mozayyan Esfahani; Ali Sadraie; Amir Kazem Sadraie
- Starring: Pedram Ansari; Narbe Vartan
- Cinematography: Ashkan Ashkani
- Edited by: Ehsan Vaseghi
- Music by: Garegin Arakelyan
- Production company: Three Gardens
- Distributed by: TAAT FILMS
- Release date: 2016
- Running time: 78 minutes
- Countries: Armenia; Iran
- Languages: Armenian; English; Persian

Apricot Groves (Armenian: Ծիրանի Պուրակներ, romanized: Tsirani Purakner, Persian: باغ های زردآلو, romanized: Bagh-haye Zardaloo) is a 2016 Armenian–Iranian drama film directed by Pouria Heidary Oureh. The film is one of the most internationally appeared film in the history of Armenian cinema, with dozens of international film festival selections.

== Development ==
In an interview with CivilNet, director Pouria Heidary Oureh stated that after being initially provided support by Armenian film authorities, the support was withdrawn following the completion of the film:

[T]he main problem is, like, we made this film with National Cinema Center of Armenia, and this what you do when you go to other country to make movie. You usually go to official organization to make a film, and that's what we did, and this is actually the right thing to do in any other country you go. So, we went there, we gave them our script, and they read it, they said they really liked it, and we started making the movie. When we finished the movie, they told us that we're not allowed to put their name in our film. Which is, like, maybe like, if we're doing it in any other countries, they would've put it in the contract that you have to put our name in the beginning and the end of the film. So, when the movie finished, which they're supposed to support us for screening the film in theatres, and introduce us to the local film festivals, and this is never happened.

== Plot ==
Aram, an Iranian Armenian youth who has immigrated to the United States in childhood, visits Armenia for the first time to propose to an Armenian girlfriend Aram met and lived with in the United States. Aram sees many cultural, religious, and national differences on the one-day trip, but more difficult obstacles remain, such as a gender-affirming surgery in neighboring Iran.

== Cast ==
- Narbe Vartan as Aram
- Pedram Ansari as Vartan
- Hovhannes Azoyan as Arman
- Allison Gangi as Bride
- Samvel Sarkisyan as Father
- Maro Hakobyan as Mother
- Araik Sargsyan as Uncle
- Azadeh Esmaeilkhani as Nurse
- Tigran Davtyan as Duduk Player
- Ara Karagyan as Barber
- Edgar Manucharyan as Bartender
- Saeed Bojnoordi as Immigration Officer

== Reception ==
At the 2017 Arpa International Film Festival, the film was nominated for Best Screenplay, Best Director and Best Feature Film. During that same year's Pomegranate Film Festival, the film was nominated for Best Feature Film.

== Screenings and censorship ==
=== 2017 Golden Apricot Yerevan International Film Festival ===
Filmmakers who had submitted their work to be screened at the 2017 Golden Apricot Yerevan International Film Festival in an off-competition program entitled, "Armenians: Internal And External Views,” were informed by event organizers that the screening of the program had been cancelled, without elaborating on a reason for this decision. Activists took to social media to criticize the event cancellation, with some claiming that two LGBT+-themed films — Apricot Groves and Listen to Me: Untold Stories Beyond Hatred — were the reason for the cancellation.

Atom Egoyan and Arsinée Khanjian, prominent Armenian Canadian figures in cinema, denounced this cancellation, stating that it was "dismaying to see a festival that we both proudly advocated for within the international film community in the name of films and filmmakers that spoke of such urgent human rights issues can be suppressed, especially when these ideas need to be discussed and brought to light." An open letter signed by filmmakers, LGBT+ activists, politicians and others stated that "This institution which is accepted by the Armenian society should not block and hinder the development of Armenian cinematography." LGBTQ+ rights organization Pink Armenia called the cancellation "not only discrimination against Armenian LGBT community, and violation of freedom of expression and freedom to create, but also a slap to Armenian cinematography[.]" The European Union's Eastern Partnership Civil Society Forum called on Armenian authorities to fulfill their international commitments, stating that "The incident has a negative impact on the reputation of the country and runs contrary to the process of Armenia's joining the Creative Europe programme."

=== Other screenings ===
Following the Golden Apricot cancellation, the film was screened at the 2017 Arpa International Film Festival in Los Angeles. This screening was applauded by GALAS LGBTQ+ Armenian Society.

The film was screened at the 2017 Pomegranate Film Festival in Toronto.
