= Sunrise over Lake Van =

2011 film

- Directed by: Artak Igityan; Vahan Stepanyan
- Written by: Armen Vatyan
- Starring: Jean Pierre Nshanyan
- Cinematography: Rouben Shahbazyan
- Release date: 13 July 2011 (Yerevan IFF)
- Running time: 93 minutes
- Country: Armenia
- Language: Armenian

Sunrise over Lake Van (Armenian: Վանա ծովուն արշալույսը; Vanatzovun Arshaluyse) is a 2011 Armenian drama film directed by Artak Igityan and Vahan Stepanyan. The film was screened at the 2011 Golden Apricot International Film Festival.

== Cast ==
- Jean Pierre Nshanyan as Tigran
- Aren Vatyan as Gevorg
- Arevik Martirosyan
- Gunisigi Zan as Elise
- Karen Dzhangiryan as Karapeth
