= Yerevan State Institute of Musical Chamber Theater =

Yerevan State Institute of Musical Chamber Theater, (Armenian: Երևանի պետական կամերային երաժշտական թատրոն), is a state university and higher education institution based in Yerevan, the capital Armenia. In 1987, the university was founded by David Zalyan as the Yerevan State Junior Musical Theater. He was also appointed its creative director. According to the order of the Republic of Armenia's ministry of culture, youth affairs and sport it was renamed State Musical Chamber Theater.
