= Gor Kirakosian =

American film director

Gor Karoyi Kirakosian (born May 27, 1981) is an Armenian-American director, producer, and screenwriter known for his comedy films, such as Big Story in Small City, Lost and Found in Armenia, Ticket to Vegas, The Knight's Move, and Honest Thieves.

== Directing career ==
Kirakosian was born in 1981 in Yerevan, Armenia. He came to the United States with his family when he was eleven, settling in Glendale, California. After graduating from John Marshall High School, he went onto attend the Art Center of Design in Pasadena. Kirakosian graduated in the top five percent of his class. As a student he completed a short film I Hate the Story of Romeo & Juliet and a feature film Big Story in a Small City, which was screened in Armenia, Russia, Los Angeles, Toronto and Buenos Aires. The film, which Kirakosian co-wrote, directed and edited, was well-received, and won six international film festival awards, including “Best Foreign Film” at the Beverly Hills Film Festival, “Best Film” at the DeadCenter Film Festival, “Best Comedy Film” at the Armenian Comedy Awards.

Graduating with honors, Kirakosian received his Bachelor of Fine Arts in 2006. During his time in the various production stages of his features, Kirakosian still found time to direct many music videos for the Armenian entertainment market. In 2006, Kirakosian won “Best Music Video” at the Armenian Music Awards for Mihran's “Just Like That.”

In Los Angeles, Kirakosian directed 13 episodes of the Armenian comedy show titled Demq Show which won “Best TV Entertainment Show” in 2001 at the Armenian Music Awards. He also directed a stage shows Armenian Demq Awards, Demq TV, Demq Show VS. Vitamin Club, Demq Comedy Overdose, Circus Demq Soleil and Demq Telethon which won “Best Comedy Stage Show” in 2007 at the Armenian Comedy Awards.

In 2012, Kirakosian finished his second feature film, Lost and Found in Armenia, a fish-out-of-water comedy starring Jamie Kennedy and Angela Sarafyan. The film received “The Audience Choice Award” at the Pomegranate Film Festival, and “Achievement in International Cinema” at the Arpa International Film Festival. The film was released in United States, Russia, Georgia and Armenia. In Armenia, Lost and Found in Armenia broke the record for remaining on the big screens the longest, holding its place on the screens for more than 5 months.

Kirakosian's next project, the action comedy Ticket to Vegas, was shot in the summer of 2012 in the United States starring both Russian and high-profile American actors, including Danny Trejo. It was intended for the Russian film market. In early 2013, Ticket to Vegas was released on more than 1,200 screens in Russia, played for seven weeks and was the second-highest earner in the box office.

His next film, The Knight’s Move was released in November 2013. The film, shot in Kazakhstan and Armenia, showcases the beauty and unique culture of both countries. The Knight’s Move was released in Kazakhstan, Russia & Armenia. The film received “Best Feature Film” at the Pomegranate Film Festival.

As of June 2017, Kirakosian is working on three different projects: Family Business, a full English-language film to be produced in America, and two Armenian films, Operation Jazzve and Once Upon a Time, which will be the first Armenian fairy tale film.
