= David Babakhanyan =

Armenian film director (born 1975)

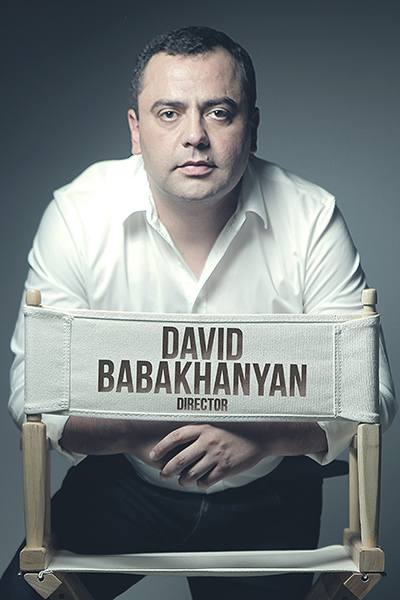
- Born: July 2, 1975 (age 51); Yerevan, Armenian SSR, Soviet Union
- Occupations: Film director, screenwriter, producer
- Years active: 1995–present

David Aleksandri Babakhanyan (Armenian: Դավիթ Ալեքսանդրի Բաբախանյան, born July 2, 1975) is an Armenian film director, producer and screenwriter. His career began in 1995, in cooperation with "Sharm Holding", as a screenwriter. He has cooperated with channels Armenia TV and Armenia 1 (Public Television of Armenia). Since 2012, he has been the general director at Armenia TV. He is a producer, screenwriter and director of a significant number of Armenian films and TV series.

== Biography ==
David Babakhanyan was born on July 2, 1975, in Yerevan, Armenia (then part of the Soviet Union).

After graduating from the secondary school No. 149 in 1992, David entered Yerevan State Medical University, traineeship on dermatovenereology. After graduating from the university he served as a medical officer in the national army.

In 1995, early in his career, Babakhanyan cooperated with "Sharm Holding" as a screenwriter. In 2003, he started cooperating with Armenia TV.

From 2003 to 2008, he was the director of the most popular Cool Program (a show of comic sketches).

In 2009, he began cooperating with Armenia 1. A year later he initiated and brought to life a youth TV-series School of Angels. In 2001 he directed "The carousel of life" — short TV novels show.

Since 2010, in cooperation with "Sharm Holding", David Babakhanyan started production of his trilogy of "A Millionaire Wanted", "The Fiancé from Circus" and "Poker.am". In 2010, he directed A Millionaire Wanted movie.

In 2011, he became director of The Fiancé from Circus. Then in 2012, he filmed Poker.AM which critics considered one of the best films in the Armenian comedy genre. The film set a record at the cinemas. The film budget was estimated 300–400 thousand dollars.

Since 2012, he has been the general director at Armenia TV, producing and co-authoring a list of shows.

Later on, he created the most successful and popular sitcoms in recent times, which include Husband of Convenience in 2013 (as a producer), Full House in 2014 (as a co-author) and Domino in 2015 (as a producer).

In 2015, Babakhanyan filmed North-South (also known as Four Buddies and The Bride) comedy which attracted audiences of all ages, thus strengthening his leading position in the comedy genre. It is the first film in Armenia where 3D-animation and visual effects were used to such a large scale and volume.

In 2019 he was a co-producer of a music video by Timati and Nazima, shot in Armenia.

In 2019 - 2020, as Armenia TV general director he cooperated with Associated Television International (USA) and Academy Films (Armenia), finally concluding with production of "The death squad" and "Caravan" TV movies.

Since 2021, David Babakhanyan is teaching Filmmaking at Russian-Armenian University.

== Filmography ==
Project	Role	Description	Year
Our Yard	Screenwriter	Musical comedy	1996
Kargin Haghordum (Cool Program)	Director	Humorous sketches	2002–2009
Kargin Multer (Cool Cartoons)	Producer		2007–2009
Unhappy Happiness	Producer	TV novel	2007
Eleven	Producer	TV series of horror genre	2008
Carousel of Life	Producer	Multi-series TV project	2009
School of Angels	Producer	TV series	2010
Beware of Money	Producer	TV series	2010
A Millionaire Wanted	Director, screenwriter, co-owner	Comedy	2010
Psychics	Author, producer	TV project	2011
The Fiancé from Circus	Director, screenwriter	Comedy	2011
Poker.AM	Director, screenwriter	Comedy	2012
Offside	Producer	Multi-series fiction film	2013
Tnpesa (Husband of Convenience)	Producer	Sitcom	2013-2015
Full House	Co-author	Sitcom	2014-2019
Domino	Producer	Sitcom	2015-2017
North-South	Director, screenwriter	Comedy	2015
Caravan	Author	TV series	2017
The Death Squad	Author	TV series	2019

== Links ==
- David Babakhanyan at IMDb
- David Babakhanyan page in KinoPoisk
