= Purgatory (TV series) =

- Քավարան
- Genre: drama mystery
- Written by: Anahit Jakhsuvaryan
- Starring: Mkhitar Melkonyan; Sergey Tovmasyan; Artur Petrosyan; Lilit Haroyan; Edgar Sargsyan; Shushan Ericyan; Meri Hakobyan; Karlos Muradyan; Irina Harutyunyan; Vahe Ziroyan; Samvel Piroyan; Grigor Baghdasaryan
- Country of origin: Armenia
- Original language: Armenian
- No. of seasons: 1
- No. of episodes: 20

Production
- Producer: Ara Baghdasaryan
- Production company: Ucom

Original release
- Network: Armenia Premium, Armenia TV
- Release: January 29 – March 30, 2017

Purgatory is an Armenian mystery drama television series. The series premiered on Armenia Premium on March 6, 2017. The series premiered on Armenia TV on 29 January 2017. It is the most googled Armenian television series.

The series takes place in Arinj.

== Premise ==
The main character of television series is Krist, who is a rich and successful businessman. One year, he became tired of celebrating New Year the same way every year. At that time he gets an offer from a travel agency to celebrate New Year in Dadidzor. But neither Krist nor twelve other vacationers can imagine what waits for them in there. The happy celebration turns into a severe trial and all twelve people trapped, needing to find a way out.
