= Kargin Haghordum =

- Genre: Comedy
- Directed by: David Babakhanyan
- Starring: Hayk Marutyan; Mkrtich Arzumanyan
- Country of origin: Armenia
- Original language: Armenian

Production
- Camera setup: Film; Multi-camera
- Running time: 20 minutes
- Production companies: Kargin Studio; Eskiz Studio

Original release
- Network: Armenia TV
- Release: September 6, 2003 – December 26, 2009

Kargin Haghordum (Armenian: Կարգին հաղորդում; Wholesome Program) is an Armenian comedy television show airing on the Armenia TV channel. It was one of the most popular and successful comedy shows in post-independent Armenian history. The show consisted of few-minute-long sketches which were usually about cheating of married couples, social problems in Armenia, football, World War II, etc.
