= Ancient Kings =

- Հին Արքաներ
- Genre: Historical; Drama
- Starring: Murad Janibekyan; Djan Nshanyan; Arman Nshanyan; Shake Tukhmanyan; Shogher Tovmasyan; Anna Grigoryan; Artur Nalbandyan; Lika Salmanyan
- Country of origin: Armenia
- Original language: Armenian
- No. of episodes: 24

Production
- Producers: Armen Arzumanyan; Ruben Mkhitaryan; Davit Babakhanyan
- Running time: 28-30 minutes
- Production company: Armenia TV

Original release
- Network: Armenia Premium, Armenia TV
- Release: November 5, 2016 – February 4, 2017

Ancient Kings is an Armenian historical drama television series. The series premiered on Armenia Premium on November 5, 2016. The cinematographer of the series is Hrach Manucharyan. The series also was shown on Armenia TV till 26 January 2018. The series takes place in various places of Armenia.
