= The Azizyans =

- Ազիզյանները
- Genre: sitcom
- Developed by: Robert Martirosyan: Van Grigoryan
- Starring: Hayk Marutyan; Ani Lupe; Boris Baghdasarov; Robert (Skum) Baghramyan; Mari Petrosyan; Stephan Hovhannisyan; Ishkhan Gharibyan; Satenik Hazaryan; Suren Arustamyan
- Composer: Hayk Petrosyan
- Country of origin: Armenia
- Original language: Armenian
- No. of seasons: 7
- No. of episodes: 143

Production
- Executive producer: Arman Marutyan
- Producer: Hayk Marutyan
- Production locations: Yerevan, Armenia
- Running time: 23-26 minutes
- Production company: Armenia TV Company

Original release
- Network: Armenia TV
- Release: October 31, 2016 – February 16, 2020

The Azizyans (Armenian: Ազիզյանները) is an Armenian sitcom television series developed by Robert Martirosyan and Van Grigoryan. The series premiered on Armenia Premium on October 31, 2016. However, the series was not available to the public until Armenia TV started airing the sitcom from October 10, 2017. The last episode aired on February 16, 2020. The series takes place in Yerevan, Armenia.

== Series overview ==
Season	Episodes	Originally released	
Season	Episodes	First released	Last released
1	24	October 31, 2016	February 1, 2017
2	24	April 3, 2017	May 20, 2017
3	24	October 16, 2017	December 31, 2018
4	24	January 7, 2019	March 13, 2019
5	23	March 19, 2019	June 4, 2019
6	12	October 11, 2019	December 31, 2019
7	12	January 27, 2020	February 16, 2020

== Premise ==
Hayk Marutyan plays the character of Garnik Azizyan – a clothes store seller, who is the only one working in the family. Mrs. Azizyan is lazy enough to perform the duties of a housewife. The problems of the father of the family don’t bother his 3 children – his daughter, who is internet-addicted and is active in all social networks; his unemployed eldest son, who is a complete loser, and his youngest son, who is a schoolboy.

== Cast and characters ==
- Hayk Marutyan portrays Garnik Azizyan
- Ani Lupe portrays Ruzan Azizyan
- Boris Baghdasarov portrays Azat Azizyan
- Mari Petrosyan portrays Mari Azizyan
- Stepan Hovhannisyan portrays Levon Azizyan
- Ishkhan Gharibyan portrays Alik Rshtuni
- Satenik Hazaryan portrays Irina Rshtuni
- Suren Arustamyan portrays Emil
