= HT Hayko =

Armenian rapper (born 1985)

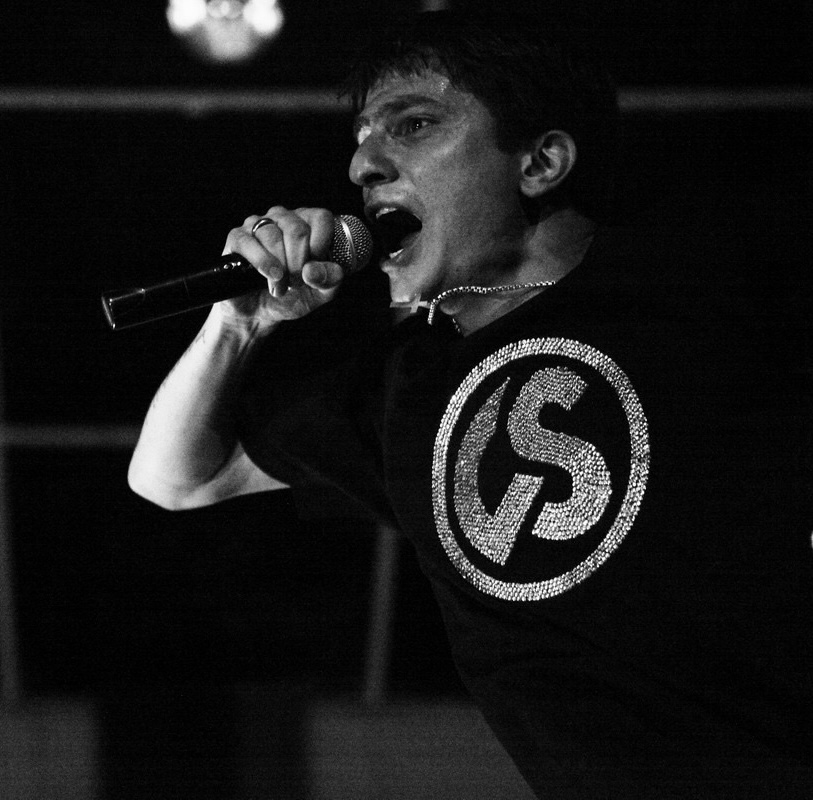
- HT Hayko in 2010

Background information
- Born: Hayk Margaryan; June 28, 1985 (age 40); Yerevan, Armenian SSR, Soviet Union
- Genres: Hip-Hop, rap
- Years active: 2001–2013
- Label: HT Music Production
- Website: Official YouTube; Official Instagram

Hayk Yurii Margaryan (Armenian: Հայկ Յուրիի Մարգարյան; born June 28, 1985), better known by his stage name HT Hayko (Armenian: ՀՏ Հայկո), is an Armenian rapper from Yerevan, Armenia.

== Early life ==
Hayk Margaryan was born on June 28, 1985, in Yerevan. He graduated from School No.55 after Chekhov. He then went to Sayat-Nova Musical School, where he learned how to play piano and trumpet. Later, Hayk graduated from the State Engineering University as an electrician.

== Career ==
HT Hayko started his music career in 2001, when he founded the Hay Tgheq (Armenian: Հայ Տղեք, literally "Armenian Guys") group with Misho. It was the first ever rap group in Armenia. Together they released two albums, eight music videos, and held concerts in Armenia as well as other countries. It dissolved in 2007. Since then, Misho and HT Hayko work separately.

=== AntiSystem ===
On May 15, 2012, a song named AntiSystem was uploaded on HT Hayko's YouTube channel. It is a political hip hop influenced by the Mashtots Park Movement. It especially inspired the youth to take actions against injustice in Armenia. The song also talked about the dismissing of Suren Zolyan as president of Yerevan State Linguistic University, which was protested by hundreds students. After one month, the video gained more than 50,000 views.

== Discography ==
=== Hay Tgheq albums ===
- Hay Tgheq (Armenian: Հայ Տղեք) (2004)
- A Drop of Honey (Armenian: Մի կաթիլ մեղր) (2006)

=== Solo albums ===
- Passed Stage (Armenian: Անցած էտապ) (2008)
- Quansh (Armenian: Քուանշ) (2009)
