= Tnpesa =

- Տնփեսա
- Genre: Comedy drama
- Developed by: Armen "Mench" Petrosyan
- Starring: Mkrtich Arzumanyan; Shushanna Tovmasyan; Hovhannes Azoyan
- Composer: Duetro Studio
- Country of origin: Armenia
- Original language: Armenian
- No. of seasons: 4
- No. of episodes: 96

Production
- Executive producer: David Babakhanyan
- Producer: Harut Khalafyan
- Production locations: Yerevan, Armenia
- Editors: Vazgen Ghazaryan; Arkadi Manukyan
- Running time: 25-32 minutes
- Production company: Armenia TV Company

Original release
- Network: Armenia TV
- Release: October 9, 2013 – May 30, 2015

Tnpesa (Armenian: Տնփեսա; "Husband of Convenience") is an Armenian comedy drama television series developed by Armen Petrosyan. The series aired on Armenia TV from October 9, 2013 to May 30, 2015, and takes place in Yerevan.

== Series overview ==
Season	Episodes	Originally released	
Season	Episodes	First released	Last released
1	25	October 9, 2013	February 2014
2	24	May 1, 2014	July 27, 2014
3	23	October 18, 2014	December 31, 2014
4	24	March 10, 2015	May 30, 2015

== Series synopsis ==
=== Season 2 ===
Koryun Anushavanich tells Manuk that he is free to go home. They agree that in the nearest future, Manuk should introduce them with his parents. But suddenly, Koryun's childhood friend Vilen visits him with his son David; last 15 years they have been living abroad. At the sight of Koryun, David changes his mind and postpones meeting Manuk's parents.

=== Season 3 ===
Manuk and Anush return from their honeymoon. Koryun Anushavanich has a surprise for the bride and the groom. He gives them one of his businesses, and trusts Manuk with the position of his chief accountant. It seems to Manuk, that everything is getting better, but it only seems to him.

=== Season 4 ===
Partners of Koryun Anushavanch entrap Koryun and steal his entire fortune. When Koryun is totally hopeless, someone appears and promises Koryun to get him back all the loss. All the members of family know about the misfortune of Koryun, except Anushik, who will become a mother in 3 months. The family members should do everything to keep her away from worries. But the problem gets more complicated when a Real Estate Agent appears who wants to sell Koryun's mansion, which is under a pledge, at any price.

== Cast and characters ==
- Hovhannes Azoyan portrays Manouk, Husband of convenience. (Seasons 1-4)
- Mkrtich Arzumanyan portrays Koryun Anoushavanich and Anoushavan granpa (Seasons 1–4), Father of Anoushik (as Koryun), grandfather of Anoushik (Anoushavan granpa)
- Shushanna Tovmasyan portrays Anoushik (Seasons 1-4), Girlfriend of Manouk (Season 1), Wife of Manouk (Seasons 2-4)
- Vahagn Galstyan portrays Sargis (Saqo) (Seasons 1–4)
- Hasmik Verdyan portrays Anna (Season 4)
- Alina Martirosyan portrays Edita (Seasons 1-3), Ex-wife of Koryun
- Naira Shahiryan portrays Rima (Seasons 1-4), Worker for Koryun
- Lusine Arshakyan portrays Silva (Seasons 1-4), Worker at home as a cooker
- Carlos Muradyan portrays Davith (Seasons 2), Friend of Anoushik
- ????? portrays Saqo (Seasons 3), New worker
- Vanik Mkrtchyan portrays Mr Misak (Seasons 3), Father of Manouk
- Tigran Gyulumyan portrays Ashot (Seasons 4), Broker
