= Tavush (village) =

Tavush Տավուշ
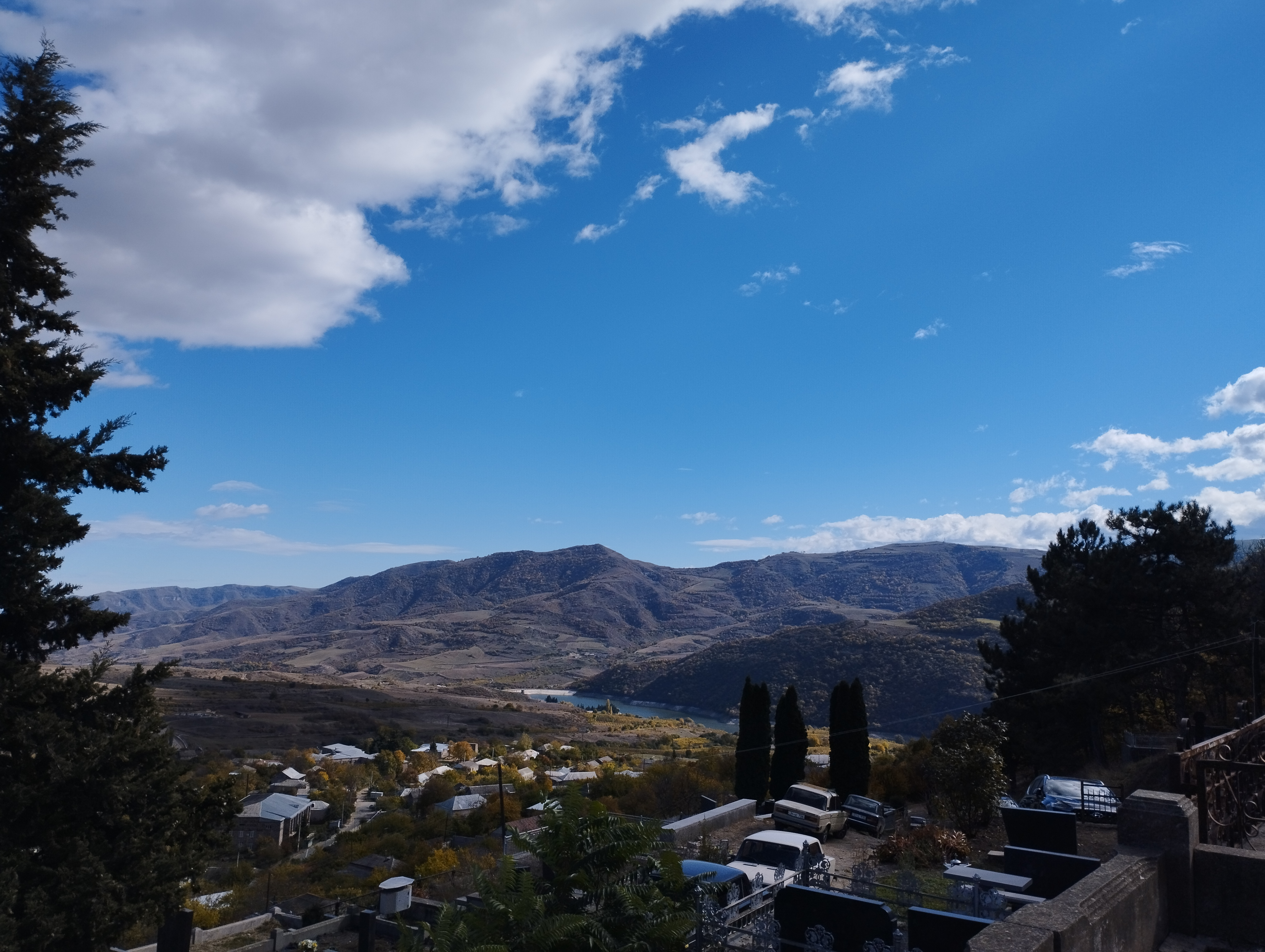
- A view of Tavush village

- Location within Armenia Location within Tavush
- Coordinates: 40°54′52″N 45°24′04″E
- Country: Armenia
- Province: Tavush
- Municipality: Berd

Population (2011)
  - Total: 1,454
- Time zone: UTC+4 (AMT)

Tavush (Tovuz, Tauz, Touzkend, Armenian: Տավուշ) is a village in the Berd Municipality of the Tavush Province of Armenia.

== History of name ==
First time, the name of village was written in "History of Armenia" by Movses Khorenatsi, in legend of Vardges Manuk. There it was called Tuhq. By historian Artashes Shahnazaryan in old times people called village in that way.

== Gallery ==
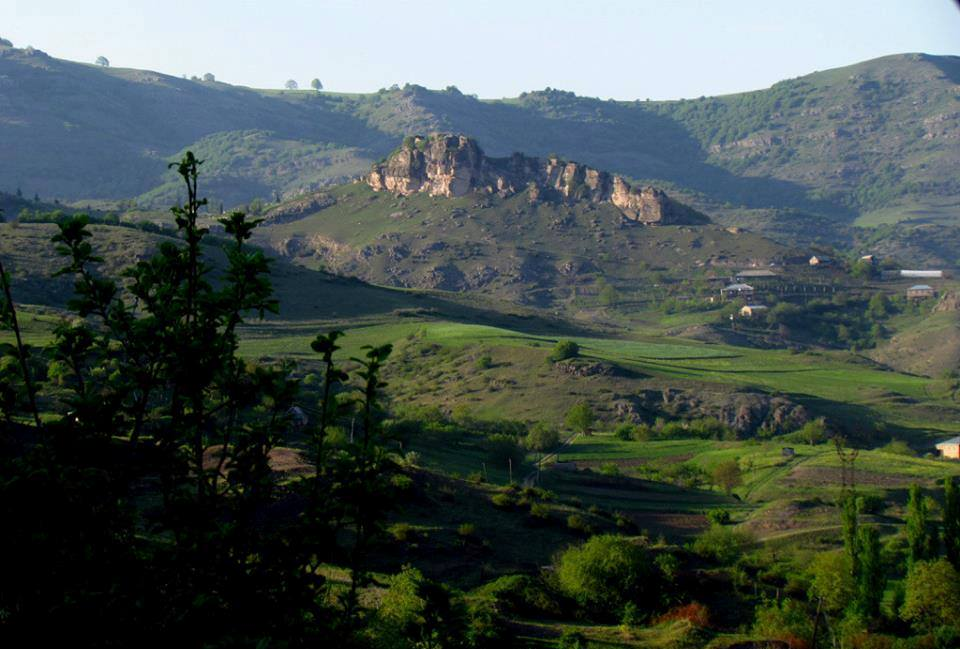
Scenery around Tavush

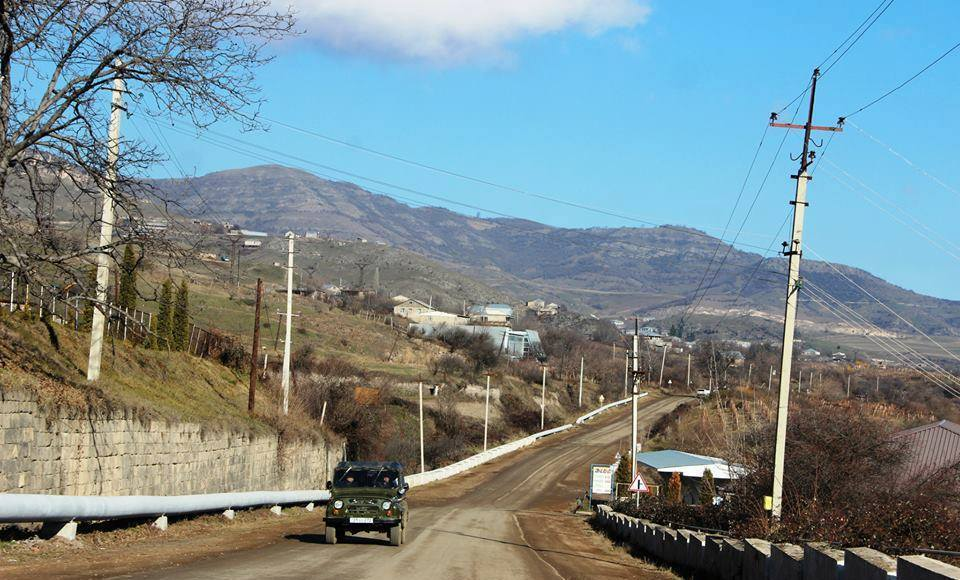
Street in Tavush

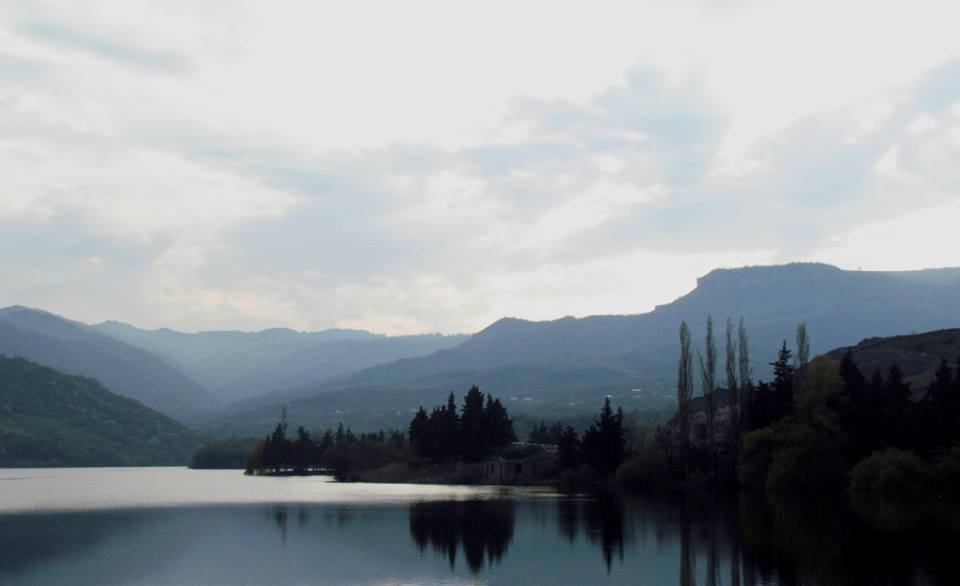
Tavush reservoir

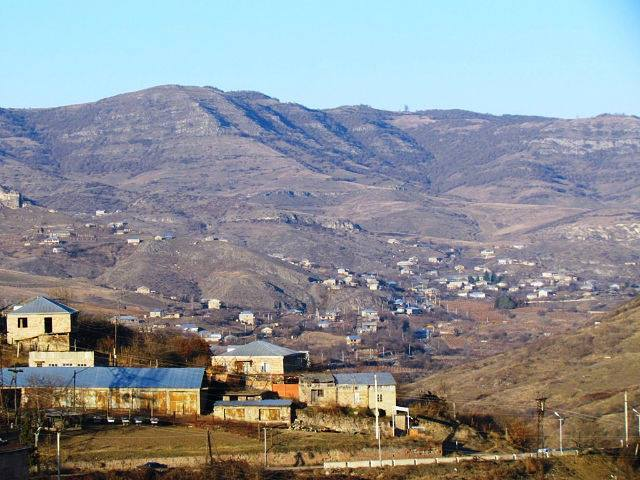
A view of Tavush
