= Misho =

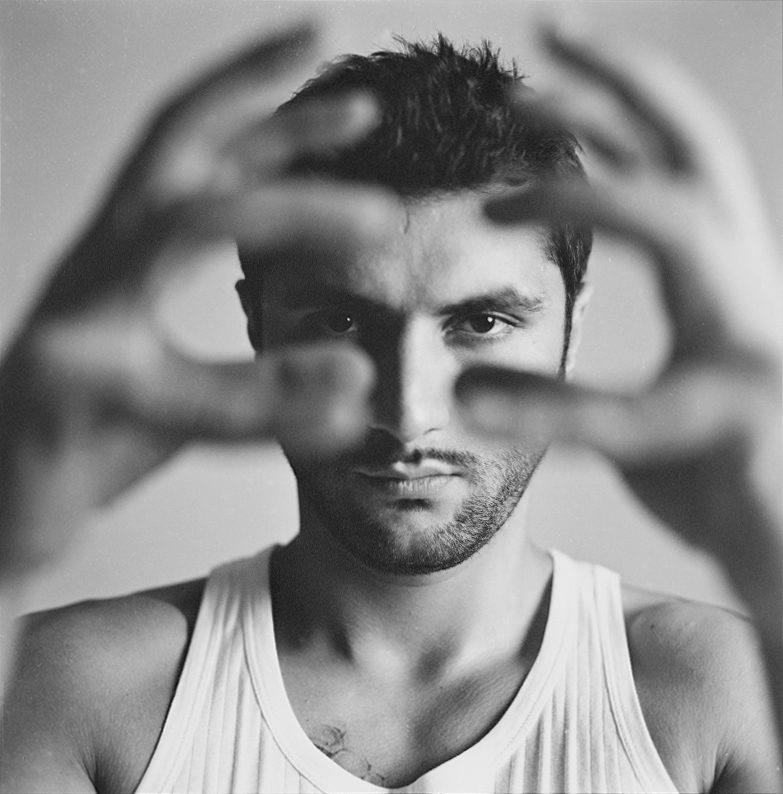

Background information
- Born: Mikayel Abrahamyan; December 24, 1984 (age 41); Yerevan, Armenian SSR, Soviet Union
- Genre: Hip hop
- Years active: 2000–present
- Label: Hay Team Production

Logo
- Website: misho.am

Mikayel Valerii Abrahamyan (Armenian: Միքայել Վալերիի Աբրահամյան; born December 24, 1984), known professionally as Misho (Armenian: Միշո), is an Armenian rapper. One of the first representatives of rap in Armenia.

== Early life ==
Mikayel Abrahamyan was born on December 24, 1984 in Yerevan to a family of doctor and teacher from the Republic of Artsakh. He was involved in basketball during his late school and college years. In 2009, he graduated from the Yerevan State Medical University and received his medical license as a doctor.

== Musical career ==
Misho became interested in rap music in his high school years. He had started writing poetry at the age of 14, when he first listened to hip-hop music. He was fascinated by how music and poetry could go together, and so he realized he wanted to do that himself. In 2000, with his childhood friends Yoj, Hamo, and his cousin Sash, Misho formed a group called "Selected from...." where he first experimented with creating hip-hop music in the Armenian language. They wrote songs both in Literary Armenian and Russian. A year later, the group dissolved, without any apparent reason.

In 2001, Misho met HT Hayko, with whom two years later their first single came out called "Hay tghen tghaya" (Armenian: Հայ տղեն տղայա, meaning "Armenian Boy is a Boy") under the group name Hay Tgheq (Armenian: Հայ Տղեք, literally "Armenian Guys"). This was the first Armenian hip-hop group in Armenia. Hay Tgheq was formally dissolved in 2008, but by that time Misho had founded a new group called Hay Team (Armenian: Հայ Թիմ, literally "Armenian Team").

In 2007, Misho started his solo career with the release of his album, “Eka, Tesa, ...i” (Armenian: Էկա, տեսա, ...ի, meaning "I came, I saw, ..."). Misho established himself as a serious lyricist, bringing to light social injustices and taboos in his country. His body of work is unique not only in pioneering hip-hop music in Armenia, but also in his politically conscious lyrical content. Since then he’s released "Qaxaqe Xosuma, Lseq" (Armenian: Քաղաքը խոսում ա, լսեք..., meaning "The city is speaking, listen...") in 2009, "Inquam" with Garik also in 2009, "Im Lezun" (Armenian: Իմ լեզուն, meaning "My Tongue") in 2011, the "Mi Qani Hogi" (Armenian: Մի Քանի Հոգի, literally "A Few Souls") group project in 2013, "Btsaxndir" (Armenian: Բծախնդիր, meaning "Meticulous") in 2015, "Maraxux" (Armenian: Մառախուղ, meaning "Fog") in 2017, the "Mi Qani Hogi 2" (Armenian: Մի Քանի Հոգի 2, literally "A Few Souls 2") group project in 2018, and "Xchchvats Jur" (Armenian: Խճճված ջուր, meaning "Tangled Water") in 2020.

== Acting career ==
Misho’s success in music lead to various movie offers. In 2005 he had his first movie role appearance in “Our Yard 3” for which he also did the soundtrack with Hay Tgheq. In 2010 Misho was offered his first lead movie role in "A Millionaire Wanted". After the success of this film he was offered 2 more leads in "Poker.Am" (2012) and "North-South/Four Buddies and the Bride" (2015).

== Campaigns ==
Misho’s popularity with his music and acting career combined also made him the face of various campaigns. In 2012 Misho’s image was used for the AIDS campaign, the purpose of which was to ask for blood donations for those affected by the virus. Misho was also asked to hold a master workshop in Tumo Center for Creative Technologies, where he taught the children how to express themselves through the art of lyricism and rap. In 2015 VivaCell-MTS made Misho the face of their campaigns, shot 4 commercials with him, and commissioned him to write a song that would also serve as the soundtrack for their campaign called "Super BIT".

== Charity ==
After receiving his medical license, Misho continued to volunteer as a doctor alongside his musical career, helping children living in poverty, children with disabilities, and children in orphanages. He has also performed at various charity concerts, including Blood Drive in Yerevan in 2013, and a fundraiser in Brussels for needy families from Armenian villages in 2015. In 2014, Misho held concerts in various countries as part of the "Rap Help" (Rap Ognutyun) charity tour. He also organized a fundraiser for sick children in Armenia in 2017, among others.

== Personal life ==
In 2012 Misho met television producer, host and actress, Sona Oganesyan, in Los Angeles, California, and they got married in Yerevan, Armenia in 2015.

== Discography ==
Misho's albums since 2004.

=== Hay Tgheq albums ===
- Hay Tgheq (Armenian: Հայ Տղեք) (2004)
- A Drop of Honey (Armenian: Մի կաթիլ մեղր) (2006)

=== Solo albums ===
- I came, I saw, ... (Armenian: Էկա, տեսա, ...ի) (2007)
- The city is speaking, listen... (Armenian: Քաղաքը խոսում ա, լսեք...) (2009)
- Zero (Armenian: Զրո) (2010)
- My Tounge (Armenian: Իմ Լեզուն) (2011)
- Meticulous (Armenian: Բծախնդիր) (2015)
- Fog (Armenian: Մառախուղ) (2017)
- Tangled Water (Armenian: Խճճված Ջուր) (2020)

=== Collaboration albums ===
- Inquam (with Garik) (2009)
- Mi Qani Hogi (Armenian: Մի Քանի Հոգի) (as part of the group Mi Qani Hogi) (2013)
- Mi Qani Hogi 2 (Armenian: Մի Քանի Հոգի 2) (as a part of the group Mi Qani Hogi) (2018)
- 4 Remixes (2026)
