= Hovhannes Azoyan =

Armenian actor and presenter

- Հովհաննես Ազոյան
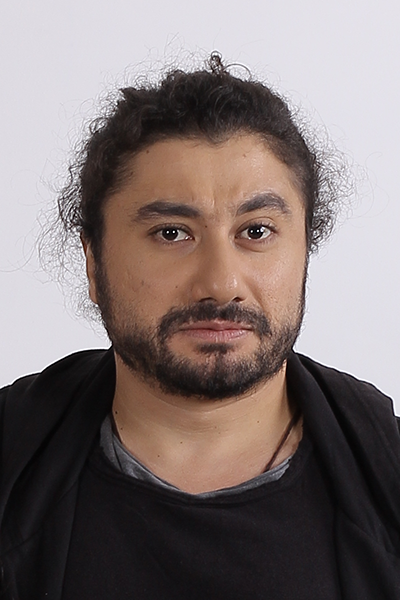
- Born: Hovhannes Azoyan; September 28, 1982 (age 43); Yerevan, Armenian SSR, Soviet Union
- Education: Armenian State University of Economics
- Occupations: Actor, Presenter
- Years active: 2002–present
- Height: 160 cm (5 ft 3 in)
- Spouse: Mery Azoyan

Hovhannes Arami Azoyan (Armenian: Հովհաննես Արամի Ազոյան; born September 28, 1982), is an Armenian actor and presenter. He is known for his roles as Manouk on Tnpesa, Narek on Groom from the Circus, and Tigran on A Millionaire Wanted.

Since 2003, he has worked for Armenia TV company, where he has been the host or participant of "Out of the Game", "Healthy Lifestyle Club", "Good Morning, Armenians", "Yere1", "Los Armenios", "Good Night, Armenians" and "Azoyan's Evening" projects.

== Filmography ==
Film
Year	Title	Role	Notes
2018	Hotel Gagarin	Aram	
2016	Apricot Groves	Arman	
2016	All-in for love	Davit Malkonyan	
2013	The Knight's Move	Tigran Vardanyan	Main Cast
2012	Poker.Am	Mushegh Petrosyan	Main Cast
2012	Open the Door	Armen	Main Cast
2011	Groom from the Circus	Narek	Main Cast with Ani Yeranyan
2010	A Millionaire Wanted	Tigran	Leading Role
2009	New Year's Movie		

Television
Year	Title	Role	Notes
2013-2015	Tnpesa	Manouk	Main cast (96 episodes)
2010-2013	Kargin Serial	Georgi	Recurring character (24 episodes)
2009-2014	Yere1	Nahapet	Main cast
2007	Kargin Multer		

As himself
Year	Title	Notes
2017	Nice Evening (Լավ Երեկո)	Special guest
