= Hayk Marutyan =

Armenian actor and politician (born 1976)

- Հայկ Մարության
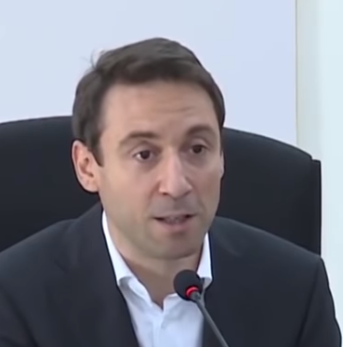
- Marutyan in 2018

58th Mayor of Yerevan
- In office 13 October 2018 – 22 December 2021
- Preceded by: Taron Margaryan; Kamo Areyan (acting)
- Succeeded by: Hrachya Sargsyan

Personal details
- Born: 18 December 1976 (age 49) Yerevan, Armenian SSR, Soviet Union
- Party: New Power
- Other political affiliations: Civil Contract (2018–2020); National Progress Party of Armenia (2023)
- Occupation: Actor, producer, politician

Hayk Hrachyayi Marutyan (Armenian: Հայկ Հրաչյայի Մարության; born December 18, 1976) is an Armenian actor, comedian, filmmaker and politician. He was the mayor of Yerevan from October 2018 to December 2021.

Marutyan rose to prominence as half of the comedy duo "Hayko Mko" (with Mkrtich "Mko" Arzumanyan) in the 2000s. They co-produced Kargin Haghordum (2002–09) and Kargin Serial (2010-13). Due to these, he is widely known as Kargin Hayko (Armenian: Կարգին Հայկո) to the Armenian public. He later starred in several comedy films, including Super Mother and Love Odd.

Marutyan became actively involved in civic activism during the presidency of Serzh Sargsyan. During the 2018 revolution he actively supported Nikol Pashinyan. He joined Pashinyan's Civil Contract party and was nominated as their candidate for mayor of Yerevan. He was elected mayor in a sweeping victory by garnering some 81.06% of the votes. Marutyan became the first mayor of Yerevan to be removed by a vote of no confidence by the Yerevan City Council in December 2021 amid political disagreements with the ruling government and Civil Contract party, which he left in December 2020.

In the run up to the 2023 Yerevan City Council election, Marutyan was nominated by the National Progress Party of Armenia as the party's mayoral candidate.

On 1 May 2024, Marutyan founded the New Power party. He was elected party Chairman.

== Life ==
Marutyan was born in Yerevan on December 18, 1976. He graduated from Anania Shirakatsy Lyceum and then continued his education at the Yerevan Polytechnic, graduating in 1997. He later served his mandatory military conscription at a special unit of the National Security Service until 1998.

Marutyan is married to Iva, a Czech national whom he met in 2004. They have 4 children Alice, Artur, Adele and Arman.

== Career ==
From the mid-1990s, Marutyan worked as a screenwriter, director, and an actor. In 2002, he founded Kargin Studio, producing the TV series Kargin Haghordum (2002–09) and Kargin Serial (2010-13). He starred with Mkrtich Arzumanyan (Mko).

== Political career ==
=== Activism ===
Marutyan participated in social and political movements from the early 2010s. In 2011 he supported the Mashtots Park Movement. In July 2013, he was among celebrities which participated in the public transportation fare increase protests. In April and May 2018, Marutyan supported opposition leader Nikol Pashinyan during the 2018 revolution.

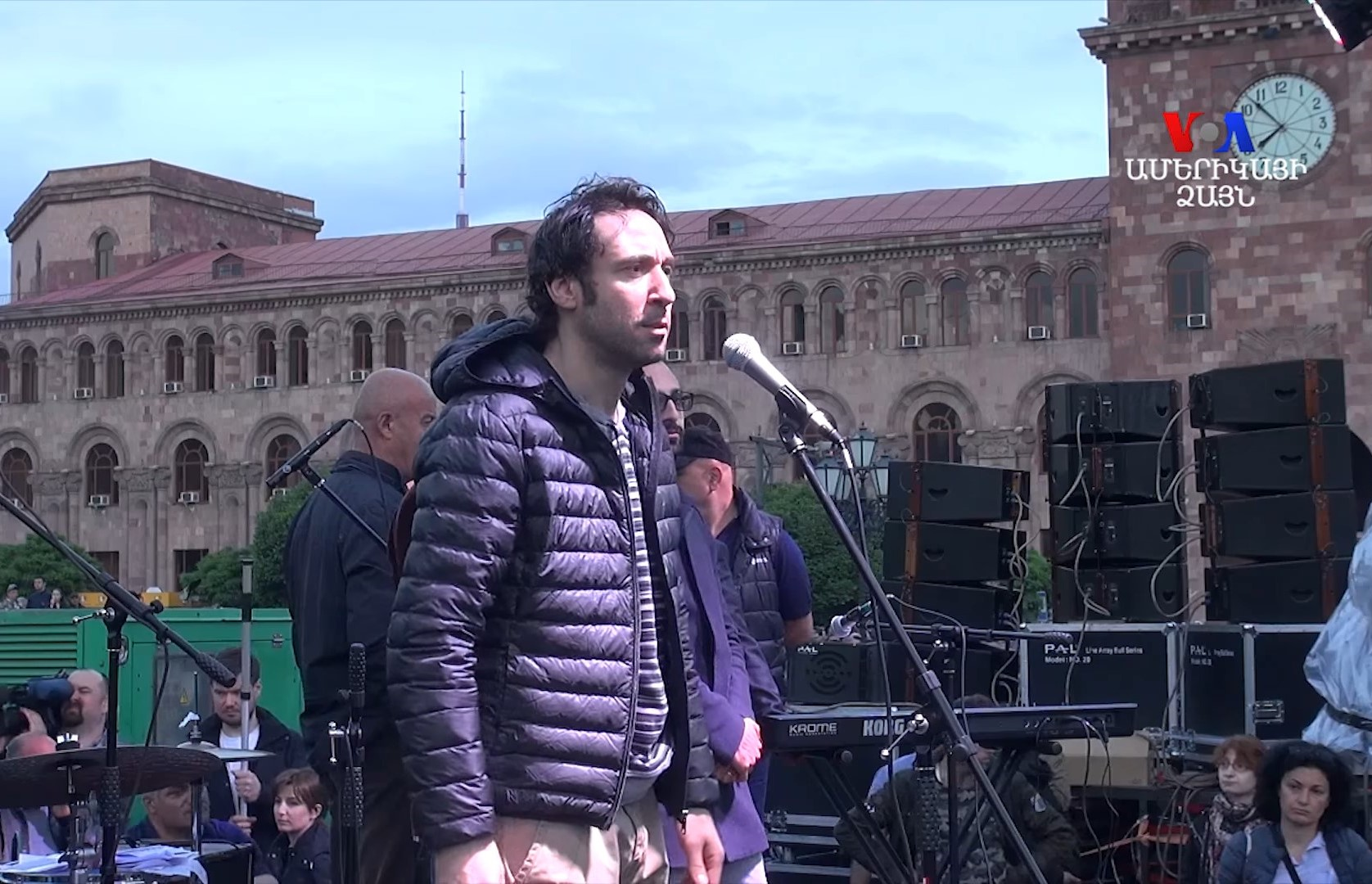
Marutyan during the Velvet Revolution in April 2018

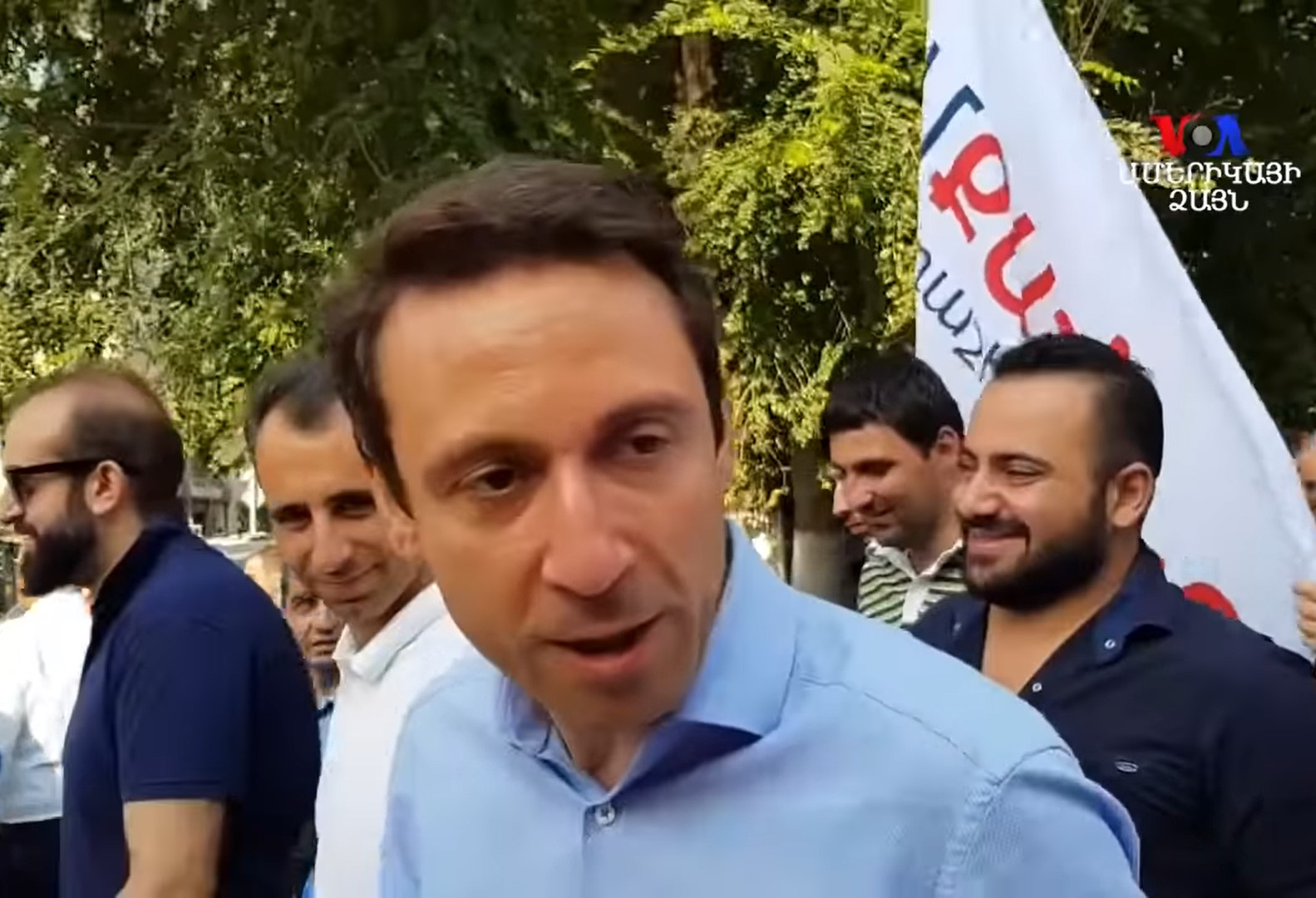
Marutyan campaigning for mayor in September 2018

=== Mayor of Yerevan ===
Election

On 30 July 2018, Marutyan was named by Civil Contract as their candidate for mayor of Yerevan after the resignation of Republican Taron Margaryan. He was elected the mayor of Yerevan on September 23, 2018. It was widely seen as, primarily, an electoral test for the post-revolutionary Pashinyan government. The alliance which Marutyan led was called My Step, a reference to the revolution. Apart from Pashinyan's Civil Contract, it included civil society members sympathetic to the revolution.

Waste management

Marutyan's first year in office was marked with a trash collection problem and a war of words with Sanitek, a Lebanese company responsible for the city's trash collection. According to The Armenian Weekly, the company was led by Nicholas Tawil, who served as its CEO. The situation culminated in Marutyan unilaterally terminating all contracts with the company in October 2019 after fining it several times. The company had effectively stopped operating in August 2019. In July 2019 Armenia's State Revenue Committee opened a criminal investigation against Sanitek. The Prosecutor General's Office announced in September 2019 that Sanitek and former city authorities had caused financial damage to Yerevan in the amount of AMD 5.3 billion ($11.1 million). Sanitek, in turn, alleged to be under "aggressive administrative pressure."

In April 2019, the Yerevan municipality set up a public-run agency to gradually replace Sanitek, which effectively occurred in September 2019.

Green spaces

Marutyan vowed to add more green spaces in Yerevan, including removing illegally built properties on formerly green spaces. In March 2019 two cafes near the Opera Theater were demolished to make way for a lawn and trees.

Transportation

Marutyan had vowed to replace Yerevan's public transportation system with a new one within two to four years. According to the reform plan, all marshrutkas will be taken off and replaced by 845 buses and 101 trolley buses.

== Filmography ==
Marutyan starred in more than 10 movies and TV shows. He worked for Sharm company from 1996 to 2002 as a scriptwriter, director. As an actor, he played in 220 Volt (1996), Valyur (1996), Our Yard (1996), Our Yard 2 (1998), Tuyn Kaset (2000), Urish Kaset (2000), Banda (2000), and Komertsion Nerkayatsum (2001). His most popular films are Super Mother and its sequel Super Mother 2, where he plays a woman, Karine Barseghyan.

=== Roles ===
Year	Name of Movie	Role	Genre	Director	Playmates
2017	Super Mother 2	Karine/Karen	Comedy	Arman Marutyan	Ani Khachikyan; Garik Papoyan
2016	The Azizyans	Garnik Azizyan	Comedy	Robert Martirosyan Van Grigoryan	
2015	Super Mother	Karine/Karen	Comedy	Arman Marutyan	Ani Khachikyan; Garik Papoyan
2015	Love Odd	Aram	Comedy	Vahagn Khachatryan; Arman Marutyan	Garik Papoyan
2011	Ala Bala Nica	Businessman Sevak	Comedy	Vahagn Khachatryan; Arman Marutyan	Mkrtich Arzumanyan
2010-2013	Kargin Serial	Vardan	Comedy	Hrant Avetisyan	Mkrtich Arzumanyan Areg Galoyan
2007	Kargin Multer	various	Comedy	David Sahakyants	Mkrtich Arzumanyan
2002-2009	Kargin Haghordum	various	Comedy	David Babakhanyan	Mkrtich Arzumanyan
2000	Banda	Yura	Comedy	Vahe Khachatryan	Mkrtich Arzumanyan; Hayk Khachatryan; Aramo; Mark Saghatelyan
1998	Our Yard 2	Kidnapper/Lav Tgha	Comedy	Mikael Dovlatyan	Hrant Tokhatyan
1996	Our Yard	Hayko	Comedy	Mikael Dovlatyan	Hrant Tokhatyan

== -References ==
Political offices
Preceded by Kamo Areyan (acting)	Mayor of Yerevan; 2018–2021	Succeeded by Hrachya Sargsyan
