= Levon Harutyunyan (actor) =

Armenian actor, presenter and playwright

- Լևոն Հարությունյան
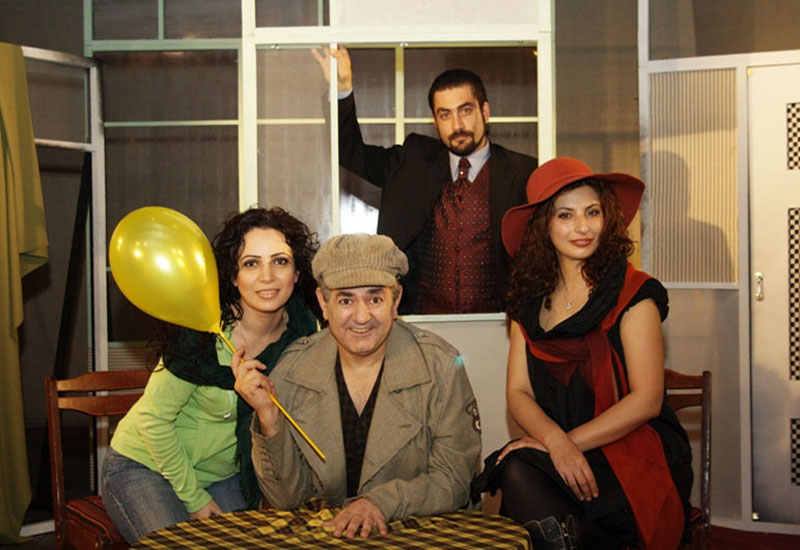
- Aralez Metro theater-studio, Levon Harutyunyan (sitting in the middle)
- Born: Levon Harutyunyan; January 19, 1967 (age 59); Sasunik, Aragatsotn Province Armenian SSR, Soviet Union
- Education: Yerevan State Institute of Theater and Cinema
- Occupations: Actor, Presenter, playwright
- Years active: 1990–present

Levon Harutyunyan (Armenian: Լևոն Հարությունյան; born January 19, 1967), is an Armenian actor, presenter and playwright.

== Career ==
He is known for his roles as Hakop on Lost & Found in Armenia, Zorik Karolovich on With the Whole Family, and Smbat on Thank you, Dad. In 1990, at the invitation of Nikolay Tsaturyan, he started working as an actor in "Metro" theater where he played in many performances.

Harutyunyan has been a member of several popular Armenian TV projects.

== Filmography ==
Film
Year	Title	Role	Notes
2017	Super Mother 2	Shef	
2016	Head of State		
2015	Love Odd	Leader	
2015	Give a Dream		
2014	Thank you, Dad	Smbo (Smbat)	
2014	Super Mother	Shef	
2013	The Knight's Move		
2013	Chicago Tzakhkatzor Transit		
2012	Lost & Found in Armenia	Hakop	
2012	Up and Down	Aram	Short
2011	Ala-bala-nica	Angel	
2011	Ashtray		
2009	Taxi Eli Lav A		
2008	Avenger		
2006	Unwritten Law		
2006	Big Story in a Small City	Police Officer	
2005	Our Yard 3	Lyova	
2004	My Big Armenian Wedding		
2003	Election	Armen	
2000-2006	Our Alphabet		

Television and web
Year	Title	Role	Notes
2017–present	Pomegranate Seed (Նռան հատիկ)		
2015	With the Whole Family (Ընտանյոք հանդերձ)	Zorik Karolovich	Main Cast (27 episodes)
2015	Chein Spasum	Himself	
2011-2012	Full Moon (Լիալուսին)	Arman	
2010	Successors (Наследники)		

As himself
Year	Title	Notes
2017	Hayastan Jan (Հայաստան Ջան)	Contestant

== Awards ==
- Stanislavski Award (1992)
- Best Male Actor (for "Uilli, Titti, Djig and the three of them are A girl") (1993)

== Performances ==
- "Aralez"
- "Topaz"
- "My sin" (Իմ մեղքը)
- "Djin-Djan" (Ջին-ջան)
- "Uilli, Titti, Djig and the three of them are A girl" (Ուիլլի, Թիթի, Ջիգ, և երեքն էլ մի աղջիկ).
