= Ani Khachikyan =

Ani Khachikyan may refer to:

- Ani Khachikyan (sprinter)
- Ani Khachikyan (actress)
