= Mashtots Park Movement =

Protest movement in Armenia

- Part of the Occupy movement
- Time for the Self-Determined Citizen, a Mashtots Park Movement poster
- Date: February 11, 2012 – May 1, 2012 (2 months, 1 week and 4 days)
- Location: Mashtots Avenue, Yerevan, Armenia; 40°10′54.9214″N 44°30′34.78″E
- Caused by: Preservation of public green areas, environmental purposes, civic activism, self-determination as citizens, against oligarchy
- Methods: Non-violent protest; Civil disobedience; Occupation; Picketing; Demonstrations; Internet activism

Parties
Environmentalists; 6 dismantling brigades of 10 people each	Government of Armenia: Police

Lead figures
Non-centralized leadership Tigran Khzmalyan; Andrias Ghukasyan	Serzh Sargsyan (President); Taron Margaryan (Yerevan Mayor); Vladimir Gasparyan (Police Chief)

Number
up to few hundred 300 activists (march to the Yerevan city hall, February 20, 2012)	

Mashtots Park Movement (Armenian: Մաշտոցի պուրակի շարժում), also known as #SaveMashtotsPark and OccupyMashtots began as a sit-in on February 11, 2012 in Mashtots Park, Yerevan. The protest was initiated by "This City Belongs to Us" civic initiative, and grew into a full-scale movement. The main issues were illegal or inadequate constructions, the destruction of trees and green zones in Yerevan, but now the questions of citizens' self-determination, fight against corruption and oligarchy, the prevalence of public interests over private have been raised. While the US occupy movements act against the bureaucratic system resulting in social and economic inequality, Mashtots Park Movement places itself in a different socioeconomic context - oligarchy, "people above the law" who, having economical and political resources, place their interests above those of the people.

== The beginning of the movement ==
=== Background ===
The roots of the Mashtots Park Movement can be traced back to the eco-activist movements of the late 2000s in Armenia. During this time, civic initiatives emerged to safeguard various endangered aspects of Armenian nature, such as Teghut forest, Trchkan waterfall, Kajaran, and more. Furthermore, urban initiatives in Yerevan fought for the preservation of the gardens, monuments, historical buildings and green zones.

=== Compensation for kiosks on Abovyan street ===
On January 18, 2011, Yerevan authorities began dismantling trade kiosks placed on downtown Abovyan Street. It was reported that as the kiosk owners had lease contracts and had made no breaches, the municipality had reached an agreement with them on the conditions of the dismantling - specifically, an agreement to compensate the dismantled kiosks by providing new ones on a new location.
While Yerevan Chief Architect Narek Sargsyan denied the rumors that the dismantled kiosks were to be moved to Aram Street, the municipality confirmed the news on January 30, 2011. Urban activists had staged a protest against the destruction of the green zone (later named Missak Manouchian Park) on the crossing of Mashtots Avenue and Aram Street in the center of Yerevan right besides Margaryan Maternity Hospital the previous day - January 29. Photographs show that the kiosk carcasses had already been assembled by that point - indicating an earlier date of construction.

=== Activist reaction ===
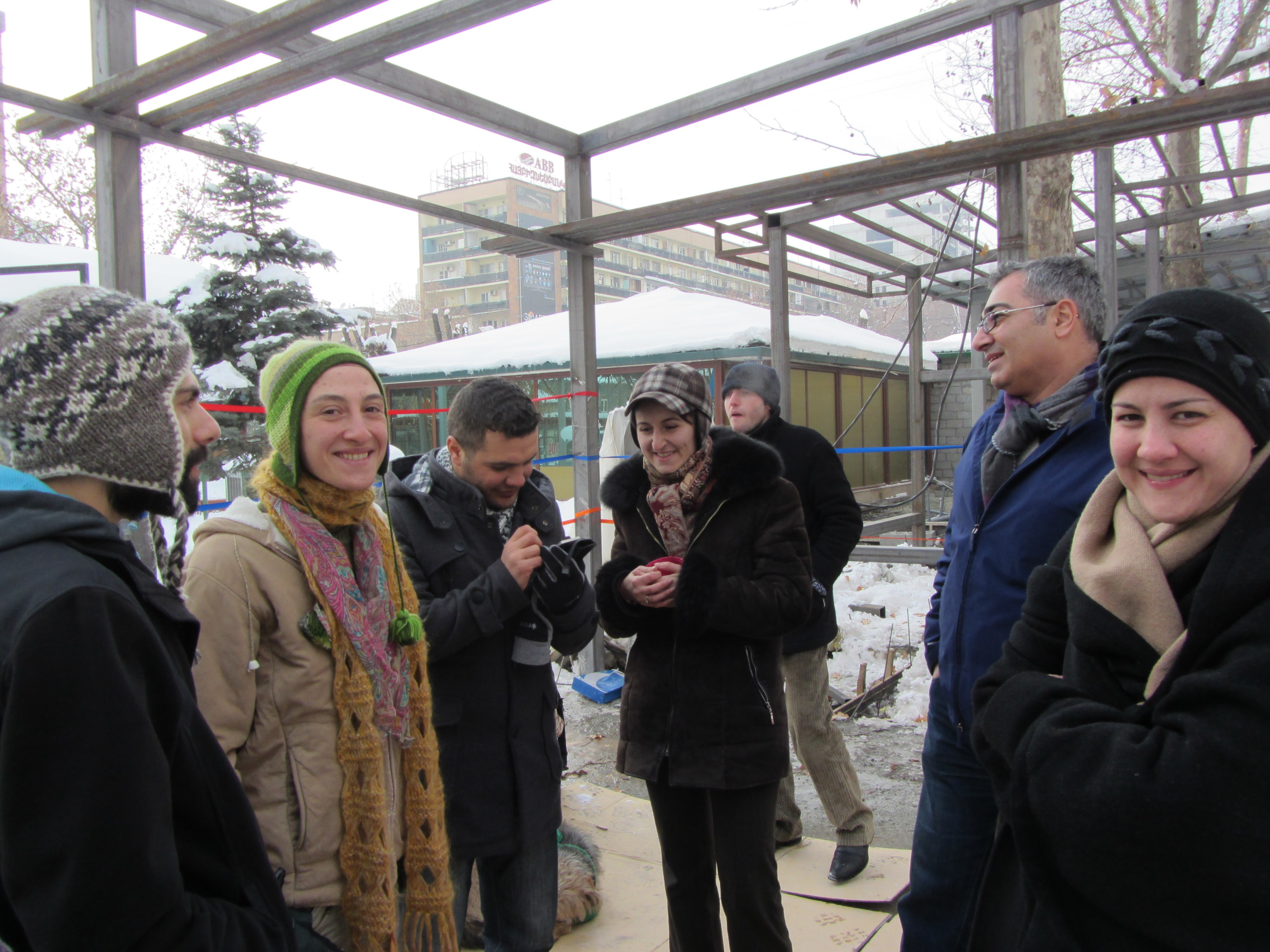
Mashtots Park Movement of 2012

Mashtots Park Movement was initiated by civic activists trying to save the park from being turned into a trade zone with kiosks. The area was quickly dubbed "Mashtots park", a name it is known to the public now. Starting from February 11, 2012, when the activists were denied legal explanation for the construction, dozens of them organized a sit-in to halt the construction and save the park.
A group of doctors from the nearby Polyclinic No. 2 and Yerevan State Medical University disapproved of the construction and its effects on the overall city health.
Activists started a petition to voice the public opinion and influence the city mayor Taron Margaryan. Some 10,000 people signed the petition.

== Escalation ==
=== First escalation: February 16–17 ===
In the morning of February 16, day 6 of the sit-in the protesters set a polyethylene cover on the kiosk carcass they were occupying to protect themselves from the abundant snow, and were approached by three civilians, presumably - associated with the construction, demanding to take the cover off.

We told them we did not break any laws. 1–2 minutes later the police approached us and said the same thing - without any justification - that we must take the cover off and stand under the snow. We immediately called different MPs and the Ombudsman's Office. Told them we were doing a peaceful picket and that they are depriving us of essential means of protecting ourselves from the snow

— Ruzanna Grigoryan, protester

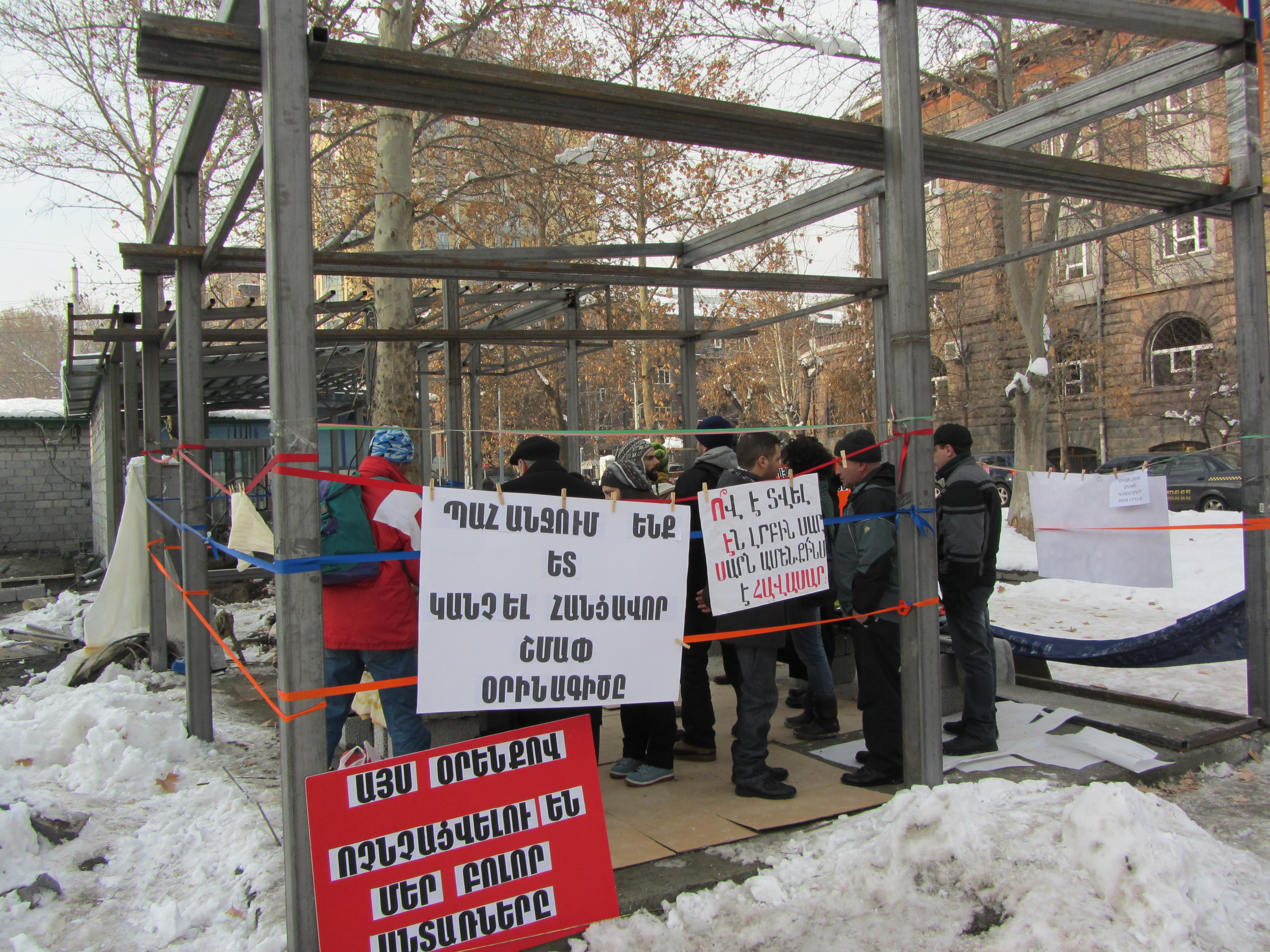
Kiosk carcass during the Mashtots Park Movement of 2012

Through the mediation of the RA Ombudsman's Office the cover remained intact.
Soon a concrete-mixing vehicle tried to enter Mashtots park to deliver concrete to the construction site. About 40 activists blocked the way of the truck to prevent it from reaching its destination, and the truck had to return because the concrete had become useless in the cold.

The police threatened to disperse the protest for violating public order, while the Ombudsman Office of Armenia interfered and argued that the peaceful protest did not violate public order.

The next day the police made an attempt to disperse the picket by forcefully evicting the protestors from the kiosk they were occupying and surrounded the construction site, blocking protesters' and reporters' entrance.
The concrete-mixing vehicle returned later - only to face some 100 protesters, some of which lay in front of the truck to block its movement.
The activists were told by Deputy Head of Yerevan Police Robert Melkonyan that a municipality representative would arrive at the park at 4PM to negotiate with them.

The activists' hopes put on the Municipality weren't justified either: as agreed, the response concerning the ongoing situation should have been received from the municipality. At 4PM no municipality officials appeared at the park. Instead, the Art Manager of the Yerevan Chamber Theater, Ara Yernjakyan - a member of the Yerevan Council of Elders - arrived to meet the protesters. The situation got tense, yet a normal dialogue was initiated.

Yernjakyan argued that all the buildings in the park were temporary, the protesters countered by showing the latter were of concrete and bricks while temporary buildings could not be fixed to the ground and/or be made of those materials. They also pointed how a boutique was erected around a tree with a hole made on the roof for the top of the tree.

Heritage Party MP Anahit Bakhshyan, also in the park, stated that the construction was capital and not moveable and carried out by Gardening CJSC (Կենտրոն-Կանաչապատում), an organization which is to deal with lawns and trimming trees and not construction. The replied to the mayor's statement "You can apply to the court if you need", saying "By the time we apply to the court, they will have completed the construction".

== Gallery ==
Photograph taken by one of the activists lying on the ground to prevent a concrete-mixing truck from entering Mashtots Park.

Mashtots Park activists protesting in front of the city hall of Yerevan, Armenia on 20 February 2012.

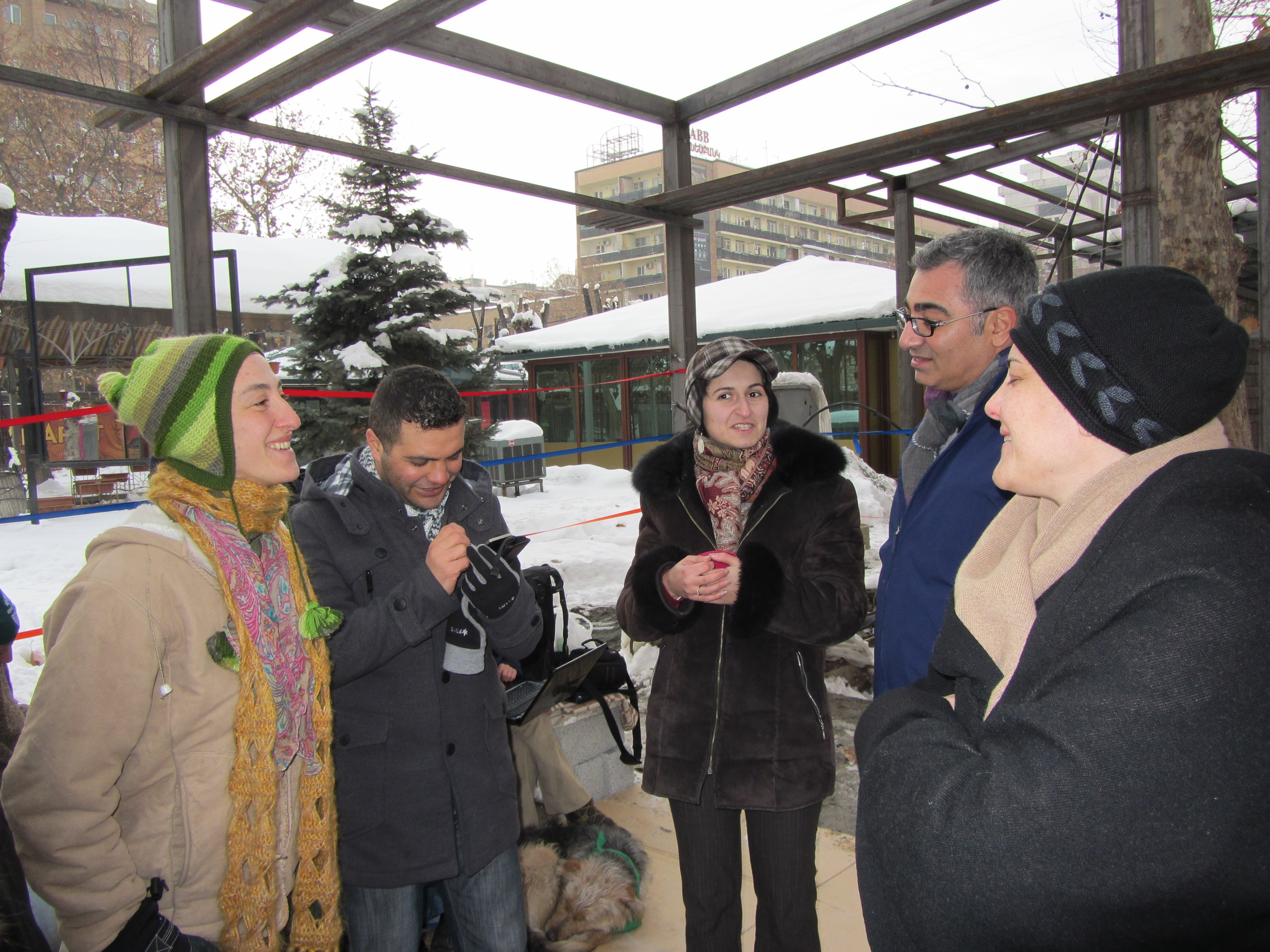
Mashtots Park during the protests

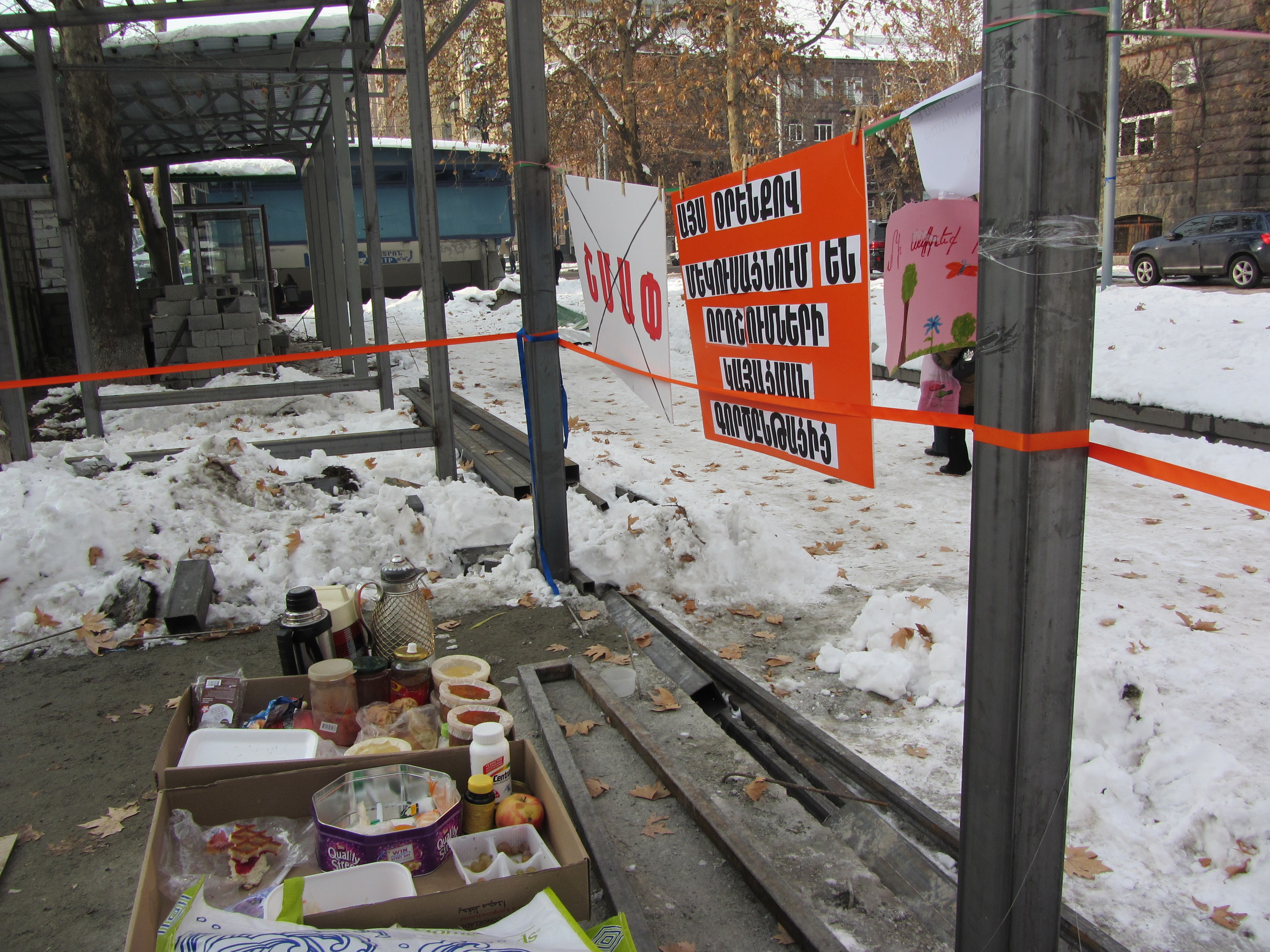
Mashtots Park during the protests

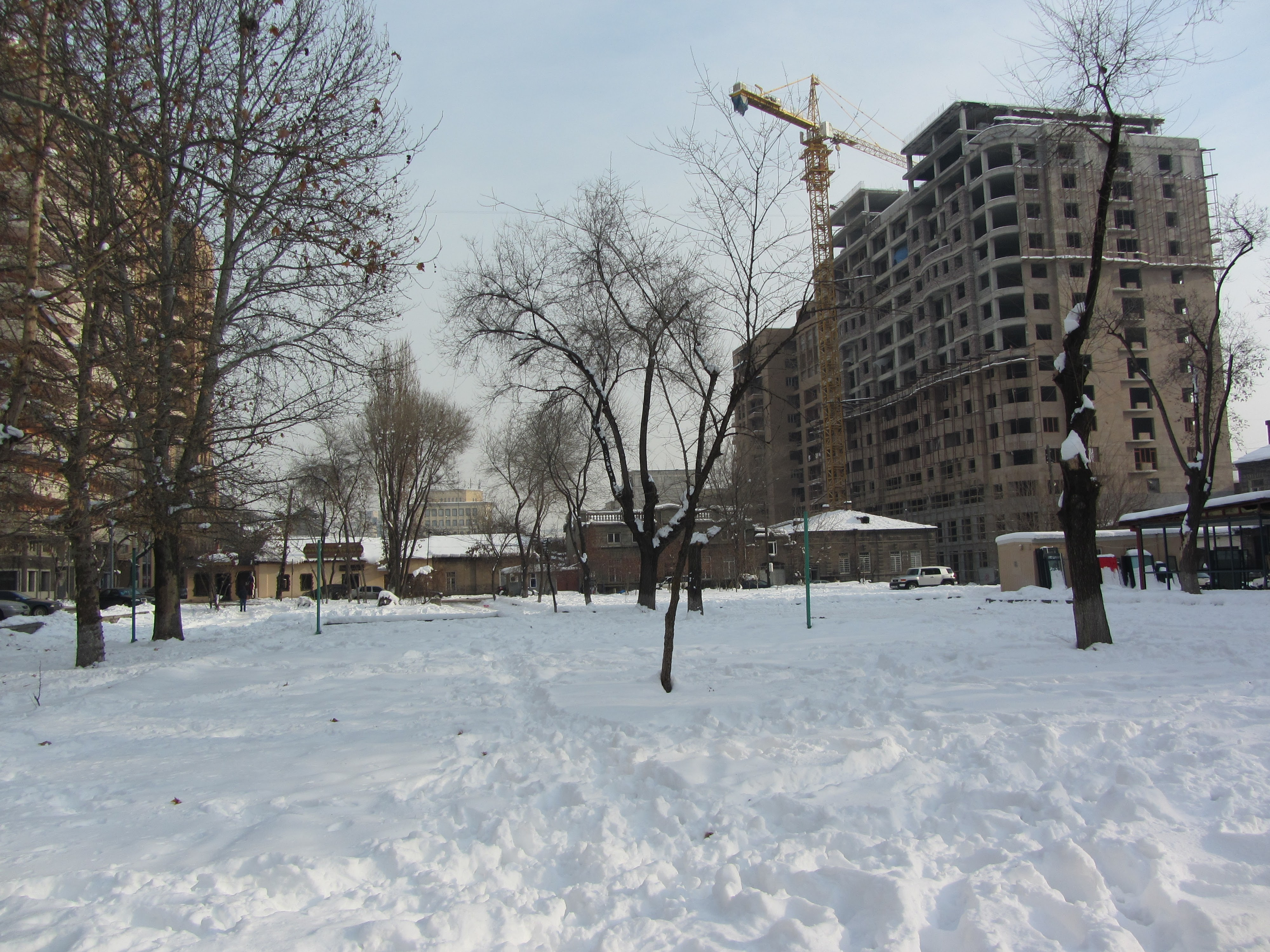
Mashtots Park during the protests

== See also ==
Occupy articles

- 99 Percent Declaration
- Law enforcement and the Occupy movement
- List of Occupy movement protest locations
- Occupy Our Homes
- Occupy Rose Parade

Other protests

- 2008 Armenian presidential election protests
- Occupy Wall Street protests
- 15 October 2011 global protests

Related articles

- Activism
- Empowered democracy
- Oligarchy
- Social peer-to-peer processes
- Waste management in Armenia
- List of protests in the 21st century

Related portals:
