= Kamo Areyan =

Armenian economist and politician(born 1957)

- Կամո Արեյան
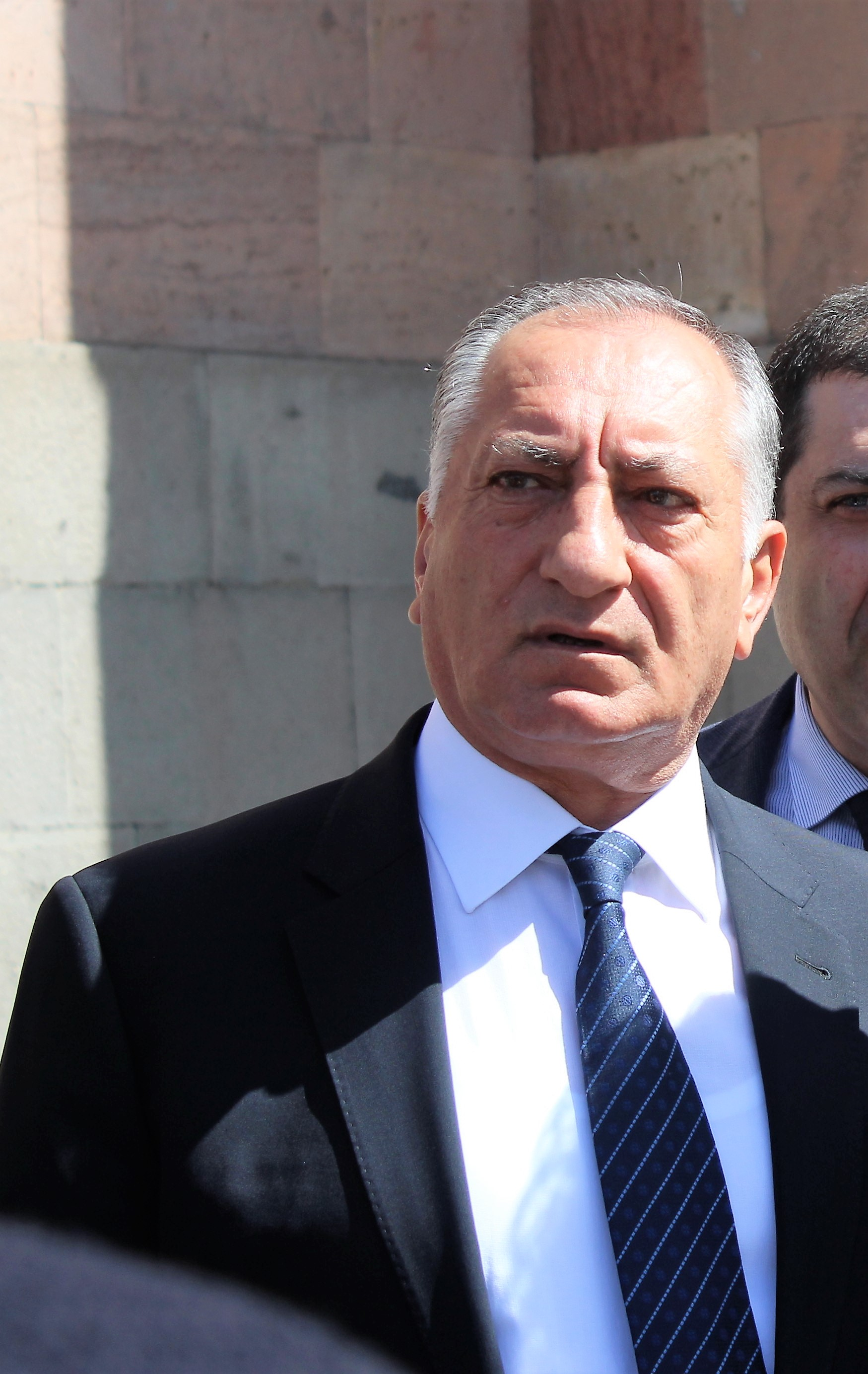
- Areyan in 2019

First Deputy Mayor of Yerevan
- In office 14 July 2003 – 19 October 2018
- Succeeded by: Hrachya Sargsyan

Mayor of Yerevan
- In office 9 July 2018 – 10 October 2018
- Preceded by: Taron Margaryan
- Succeeded by: Hayk Marutyan

Deputy Mayor of Yerevan
- In office 1997–2001

Mayor of Yerevan
- In office February 1998 – May 1998
- Preceded by: Vano Siradeghyan
- Succeeded by: Suren Abrahamyan

Personal details
- Born: 20 November 1957 (age 68) Nerkin Sasnashen, Armenia
- Spouse: Armenouhi Harutyunyan
- Children: Mher, Vahagn
- Education: Yerevan Institute of National Economy
- Occupation: Economist, politician

Kamo Areyan (Armenian: Կամո Արեյան; born 20 November 1957) is an Armenian economist and politician. After serving as Deputy Mayor for 15 years, Areyan became Chief Advisor to the Mayor, first under Hayk Marutyan, then under Hrachya Sargsyan. Sargsyan stepped down in March 2023, leaving the position of mayor vacant. Areyan is a member of the Republican Party of Armenia and served as party representative on the Yerevan City Council between 2013 and 2018.

== Early life ==
Areyan was born on 20 November 1957 in the village of Nerkin Sasnashen in the Aragatsotn Province of Armenia. He has at least one sister. He attended the Yerevan Institute of National Economy, then worked at the Academy of Sciences of the Armenian SSR's Institute of Economics until 1980, when he served for two years in the Soviet Army. He returned to his position at the Institute of Economics in 1982 and stayed there until 1995.

== Political career ==
In 1995, Areyan became a member of the National Assembly in Yerevan, a role he held for four years. During this time, he was a nonpartisan member of the Assembly's Standing Committee on Defence, National Security and Internal Affairs. He served as Deputy Mayor of Yerevan between 1997 and 2001, including nearly four months in early 1998 as Acting Mayor. He worked as the Deputy Minister of Territorial Administration from 2001 to 2002 and of its successor, the Ministry of Territorial Administration and Coordination of Industrial Infrastructures, from 2002 to 2003.

Areyan became the First Deputy Mayor of Yerevan in 2003, then again in 2009 and 2017. In May 2013, he was elected to the Yerevan City Council as a proportional representative of the Republican Party of Armenia. From 9 July to 10 October 2018, he served as Acting Mayor before being relieved from his position in the Mayor's office nine days later when his seat on the Council was voided due to the Republican Party no longer being represented. In November 2018, he was appointed to Chief Advisor to Mayor Hayk Marutyan. He remained in this role under Mayor Hrachya Sargsyan and the subsequent mayoral vacancy beginning in March 2023. Areyan is also a Council Member of the Menq Foundation for Popularisation of State and National Values.

Areyan was awarded the Anania Shirakatsi medal in 2007 and the 2nd degree medal Services to the Motherland for his political work in 2014.

== Personal life ==
His wife, Armenouhi Harutyunyan, co-owns the tourist company Armane Yekir with Areyan. Their eldest son, Mher, is a businessman and was awarded a scholarship from the Toronto chapter of the Armenian General Benevolent Union in 2011. Their younger son, Vahagn, is a private entrepreneur.
