= National Progress Party of Armenia =

Armenian political party

National Progress Party of Armenia Ազգային առաջընթաց կուսակցություն
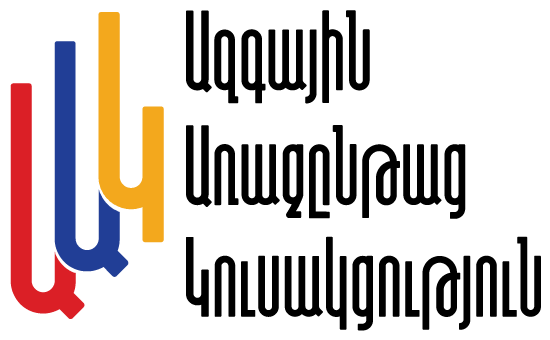
- Spokesperson: Hayk Grigoryan
- Founded: 2018
- Headquarters: Yerevan
- Ideology: Social liberalism Pro-Europeanism
- Political position: Centre-left
- National affiliation: National Democratic Pole
- Slogan: "It's time to build the country, national progress."
- National Assembly: 0 / 107
- Yerevan City Council: 14 / 65

Website
- npp.am

The National Progress Party of Armenia (Armenian: Ազգային առաջընթաց կուսակցություն, romanized: Azgayin arrajynt’ats’ kusakts’ut’yun) is a political party in Armenia, founded on 3 October 2018, by a group of political activists following the 2018 Armenian Velvet Revolution.

== History ==
Founders of the party included several activists from different civic and environmental movements, including the 2015 Electric Yerevan protests, among others. Most of these activists were also members of the movement called "We are this country," who marched to the president's palace in April 2016, under the slogan "We are with our soldiers."

The party officially launched its platform during its founding convention held on 3 October 2018, in Yerevan.

The party was the only political party running in the 2018 elections which was headed by a woman, Lusine Haroyan. Roughly 40% of party members are women.

In April 2019, Lusine Haroyan announced she was stepping down as leader of the party.

On 5 April 2021, the Board of the National Progress Party announced its decision to join the National Democratic Pole political alliance, following the on-going political unrest in the country.

Some members of the party cooperate with the New Power party.

During the 2024 Armenian protests, the party announced that they would not support the "Tavush for the Motherland" movement led by representatives of the former regime.

== Ideology ==
The party announced social liberalism as its principal ideology, however party members confirmed that the party is not explicitly socialist.

The party also advocates for the welfare state, increasing immigration, rural development, strengthening the middle-class and endorses a regulated market economy and the expansion of civil and political rights, including direct democracy and freedom of press.

In terms of foreign policy, the party supports the unification of Armenia and the Republic of Artsakh, developing stronger ties with Georgia, the European Union, United States, Iran, India, Japan and China while maintaining positive relations with Russia. However, the party believes that Armenia should withdraw its membership from the Eurasian Union and focus on both the Western integration and European integration of Armenia.

== Electoral record ==
On 9 December 2018, the National Progress Party participated in the 2018 Armenian parliamentary election. The party had 94 candidates across the country.

During the 2018 election campaign, the National Progress Party criticized Prime Minister-turned-revolutionary leader Nikol Pashinyan for abandoning the revolutionary agenda, including failure to reform the Constitution, the Electoral Code, the Law on Political Parties and failure towards instituting transitional justice before holding the snap elections. The National Progress Party advocated for abolishing the immunity of parliament members, Constitutional reforms and regional reforms and for greater human rights of citizens.

Following the 2018 election, the party won 4121 votes, or 0.33% of the popular vote. As this was less than the 5% minimum required, the party failed to gain any seats in the National Assembly. After the election results were announced, party members emphasized that they, as an extra-parliamentary force, will continue their activities and follow developments.

The party confirmed it would participate in the 2021 Armenian parliamentary elections as part of the National Democratic Pole alliance. Following the election, the National Democratic Pole received 1.49% of the popular vote, failing to gain any seats in the National Assembly.

The party participated in the 2023 Yerevan City Council election with former Mayor of Yerevan Hayk Marutyan nominated as the party's mayoral candidate. Following the election, the party won 18.89% of the vote, gaining 14 seats in the Yerevan City Council.

=== Parliamentary elections ===
Election	Leader	Votes	%	Seats	+/–	Position	Government
2018	Lusine Haroyan	4,121	0.33	0 / 132	0	▲11th	Extra-parliamentary
2021 (Note: As part of National Democratic Pole)	Hayk Grigoryan	18,976	1.49	0 / 107	0	▲8th	Extra-parliamentary

=== Local elections ===
==== Yerevan City Council elections ====
Election	Alliance	Mayor candidate	Votes	%	Seats in City Council
2023	none	Hayk Marutyan	44,266	18.89	14 / 65

== New constitutional movement ==
In 2019, the National Progress Party initiated the New Constitution movement by publishing its proposed Constitutional Amendments on its website and asked citizens to engage in the drafting and discussion process. This new form of "crowd-sourced" constitution development is similar to an initiative proposed in Iceland.

== See also ==
- Politics of Armenia
- Programs of political parties in Armenia
