= Pomegranate Seed =

Armenian drama television series

- Նռան հատիկ
- Genre: Drama; Romance
- Developed by: Diana Grigoryan
- Starring: Agnesa Shahnazaryan; Djulieta Stephanyan; Ruzan Mesropyan; Levon Haroutyunyan; Rudolph Ghevondyan; Ara Deghtrikyan; Movses Yeremyan; Roza Filberg; Hayk Chomoyan; Davit Mardyan; Arsen Levonyan
- Country of origin: Armenia
- Original language: Armenian
- No. of seasons: 1
- No. of episodes: 60

Production
- Producer: Diana Grigoryan
- Production locations: Yerevan, Armenia
- Running time: 38-40 minutes

Original release
- Network: Armenia TV, Panarmenian TV
- Release: September 11, 2017

Pomegranate Seed (Armenian: Նռան հատիկ, Nran hatik) is an Armenian drama television series. The series premiered on Armenia TV on September 11, 2017. Since then, the series airs every Mondays to Fridays at 21:45.

The series took place in Yerevan.

== Premise ==
Young Sophia's life is completely destroyed after she finds out that her boyfriend, a brave soldier and a hero, has died. Not only this news but also her father's suicide ravage Sophia's dreams and plans. Sophia's mother sold almost everything to pay her husband's debts. Moreover, she gave her two minor children to an orphanage because of the lack of normal living conditions. For living, she and her eldest daughter Sophia start working together in the governor's house as servants. In that house, Sophia meets the main villain of the film, who actually killed her boyfriend and destroyed her life.
