= Sasunik =

Village in Aragatsotn, Armenia

Sasunik Սասունիկ
- Location within Armenia Location within Aragatsotn
- Coordinates: 40°14′50″N 44°20′17″E
- Country: Armenia
- Province: Aragatsotn
- Municipality: Ashtarak
- Established: 1955

Population (2012)
  - Total: 4,102
- Time zone: UTC+4

Sasunik (Armenian: Սասունիկ) is a village in the Ashtarak Municipality of the Aragatsotn Province of Armenia. It was founded as a collective farm in 1955, and villagers were resettled from the old village of Sasunik in 1960.

== Gallery ==
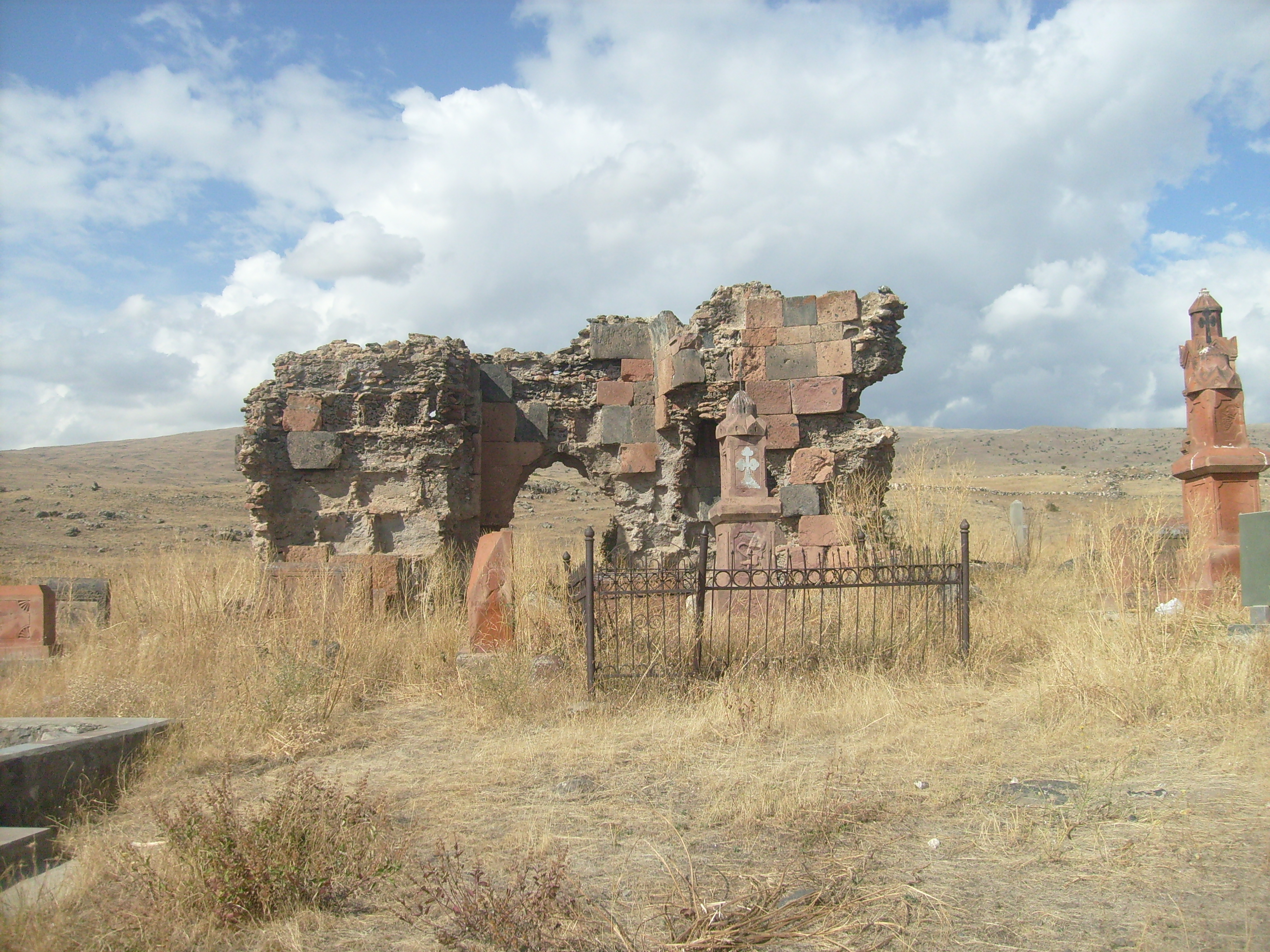
Church ruins, 7th-19th centuries

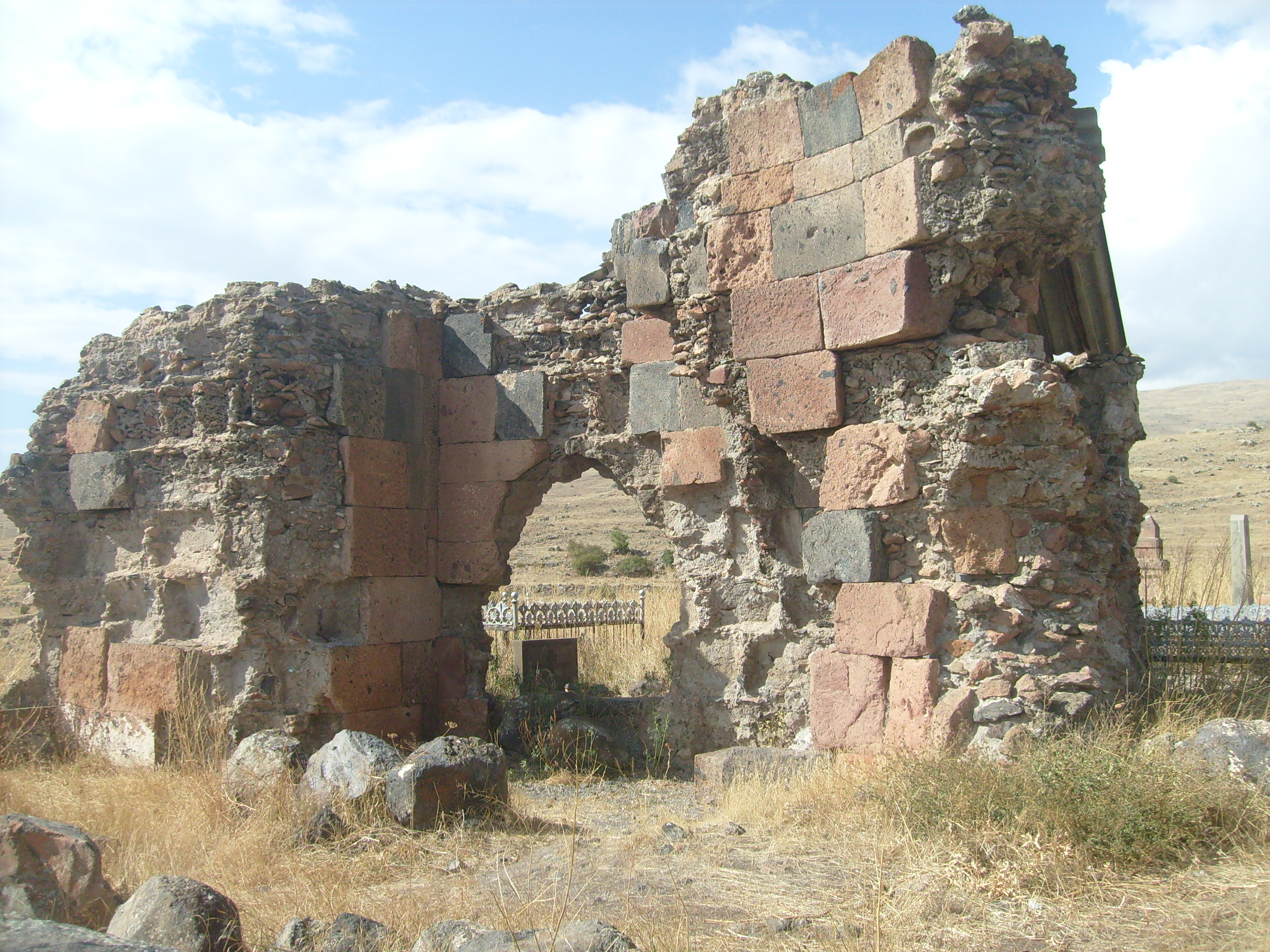
Church ruins, 7th-19th centuries

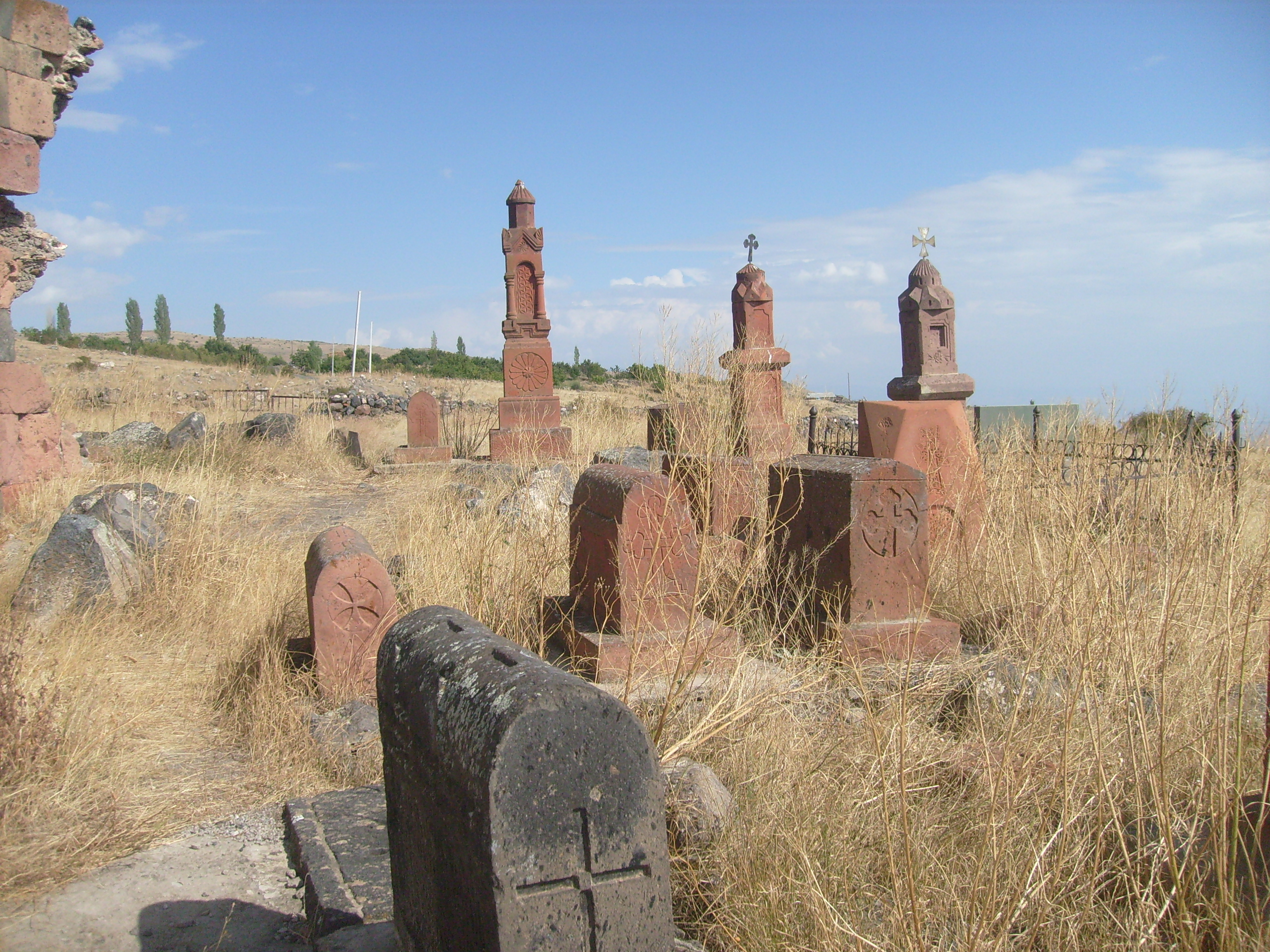
Cemetery adjacent to the church

== Notable people ==
- Levon Harutyunyan, Armenian actor, presenter and playwright
