= Love Odd =

2015 film

- Սիրո Գործակից
- Directed by: Arman Marutyan; Vahagn Khachatryan
- Written by: Arman Marutyan; Robert Martirosyan
- Produced by: Sergey Harutyunyan; Hayk Marutyan
- Starring: Hayk Marutyan; Garik Papoyan
- Production companies: Kargin Studio; Eskiz Studio
- Release date: October 22, 2015
- Running time: 104 minutes
- Country: Armenia
- Language: Armenian

Love Odd (Armenian: Սիրո Գործակից) is a 2015 Armenian adventure comedy film directed by Arman Marutyan and Vahagn Khachatryan and written by Marutyan and Robert Martirosyan, starring Hayk Marutyan and Garik Papoyan. It is a sports comedy.

== Plot ==
Two friends, Aram and Rafo, who have a joint business decide to raise money to save it. They decide to resort to fraud related to the women's tennis match in order to get out of the hopeless situation. One of them, who is in love with one of the tennis players however, wants to marry Aghvan's daughter, Piruz, who is a local authority. The romantic hero is persecuted and falls in love with Piruz, his father Aghvan, and the latter's wife, Zhanna, who tries to seduce the hero.

== Cast ==
- Hayk Marutyan as Aram
- Garik Papoyan as Rafo
- Eteri Voskanyan as Ani
- Armine Poghosyan as Piruz
- Rudolph Ghevondyan as Aghvan
- Luiza Nersisyan as Janna
- Jenya Mkrtumyan as Maret
- Khoren Levonyan as Bagrat
- Anna Harutyunyan as Iveta
- Levon Harutyunyan as Leader
- Armush
