= Waste management in Armenia =

Waste management history and processes

Waste management in Armenia is undergoing a transition to better recycling systems. There are more than 300 landfills and dumping grounds in the country, most of which are unregulated and the waste collection system is not well organized.

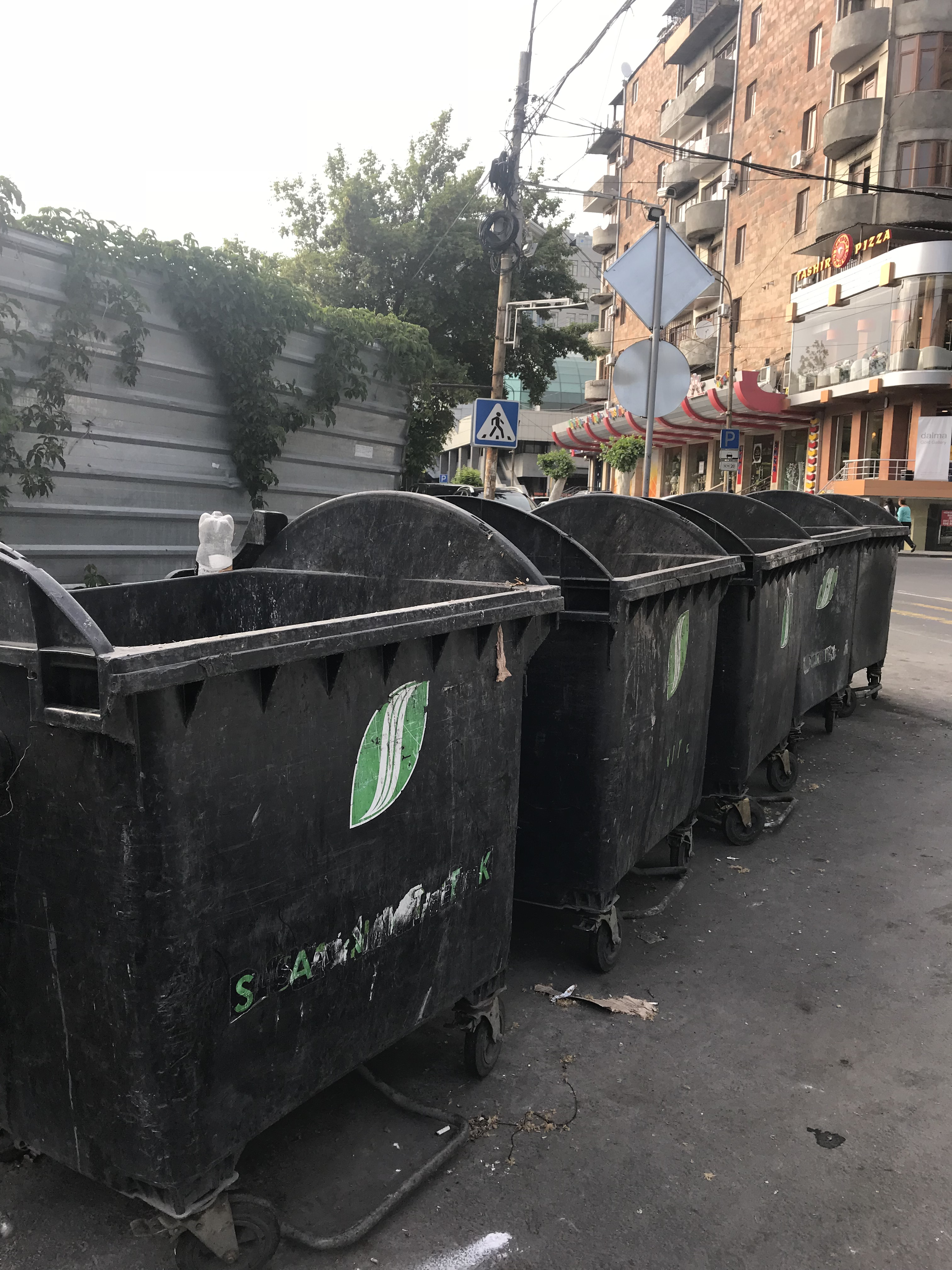
Sorted waste containers in Yerevan

On May 4, 2018, the government modifications to relevant legislation aimed at strengthening the responsibility for proper waste management.

== Waste Production ==
Armenia produces about 700,000 tonnes of waste every year, 6000 tonnes of which is recycled plastic waste. Packaging and single-use products contribute to the rapid increase of waste in Armenia and it takes nearly 40% of all the municipal waste in the country. Armenia generates approximately 350 tons of PET bottles every month and only 150-200 tons of it is recycled. Each individual in Yerevan produces around 300 kg of waste per year and a single person can produce approximately 19,760kg of waste in her/their/his lifetime (measured by the average life expectancy in Armenia which is 76 years). During holidays like Vardavar, Easter and New Year the numbers of waste production increases every year. Waste is mixed and it causes contamination, release of toxic substances and pollution of air, soil and water. The Methane gas produced from decomposing waste leads to greenhouse gas emissions and fires.

=== Food Waste ===
Food is the most wasted product in the country, and bread is the number one wasted food product. On the household level, main drivers of food waste are consumer behavior (overconsumption, poor planning), lack of education, information and awareness about waste impacts and waste reduction. Food waste is not just an environmental problem, but also an economic problem for individuals, because food waste directly impacts financial losses for households. Armenia lacks food waste addressing initiatives which will provide public awareness programs and policy interventions.

== Waste Collection and Disposal ==
Separation mainly exists in Yerevan with around 300 separation points installed in the city for plastic, paper, and glass. Because the collection system is not always organized to keep the waste separated, the separated waste gets mixed again during transportation. Separation is heavily dependent on residents’ participation, but it is still low in Armenia. Most separation happens after disposal by waste pickers who sort recyclable waste from bins and landfills. Outside of Yerevan, the separation infrastructure is very weak if it isn't absent fully.

The Armenian government is responsible for setting policies and regulations for waste collection, municipalities are responsible for organizing waste collection systems, eliminating illegal dumpsites and promoting recycling and separation, and regional authorities are responsible for monitoring waste collection and developing waste management options.

The waste collection and disposal system in Armenia is not very effective and well-functioning. In most regions, waste collection is inefficient. One of the reasons for this is old and outdated heavy containers. They are small in size and have no wheels. Another reason is old tracks which have poor compaction, poor monitoring, and no strict requirements for operators to report on how much waste has been collected. Because mostly waste is collected as mixed (unsorted) waste, recycling becomes difficult.

=== Landfills and Open Dumps ===
Landfills, especially sanitary landfills, are controlled places of waste disposal. There, waste is disposed of by packing it onto each other in thin layers. It is later covered with a layer of clay in order to stop water from entering and pieces of waste flying off and causing environmental issues. Open dumping, on the other hand, is a harmful municipal waste management practice. It is cost-efficient; however, it participates in water, soil, and air pollution by emitting toxins and hazardous substances into the environment.

Dumpsites in Armenia are open dumps. They are unregulated and sometimes not even legally designated as such. No waste sorting, recycling, or reuse takes place at any of them. Instead, garbage is dumped into a working area and then flattened using a bulldozer to create a layer of garbage 300 centimetres (120 in) thick. In 2019, the dumped rubbish in Armenia reached 590,000 tonnes, with Yerevan accounting for more than half of it, 310,000 tonnes. In July 2025, the Armenian government, in collaboration with the European Bank for Reconstruction and Development, launched the first sanitary landfills in Armenia’s Kotayk and Gegharkunik regions. However, the program was critiqued by the environmental activists because waste still does not undergo any proper sorting or recycling.

The Nubarashen landfill, located in Yerevan (40°6′24.19″N 44°32′49.26″E), is Armenia's largest waste disposal site. It receives almost all of the solid waste produced in the city of Yerevan and its suburbs, which is about 340 tons per day, or 102,000 tons per year. The site has accumulated over 7.5 million tons of domestic waste over 50 years.

== Cultural Attitudes ==
Public perception of waste disposal plays a significant role in waste management. In Armenia, this is evident in daily habits; practices like leaving a bunch of single-use plastic items in non-designated areas, especially after events, are a common issue.

In rural areas, the issues of cultural attitudes can be seen on a larger scale. For example, solid waste is often burned for heat with the reasoning that it burns faster and more efficiently than wood and generates more heat, completely disregarding the environmental effects.

=== Potential Economic Benefits ===
There is a huge economic benefit in using items made from recycled materials. For example, in 2020, a recycled plastic vase cost between $0.6–$1.9, while imported ones were about $1–$2.45. In another instance, an imported soap holder was about $0.33, but a recycled one could be less than half of that, $0.14.

The amount of waste produced in Armenia can potentially generate about $5-6 million, and 10-15 jobs per 1000 tons of waste.

=== Legislative Issues ===
Cultural views are also reflected in the legislation. There are issues, especially regarding the definition of ‘waste’. Because of the very narrow definition of ‘waste’ in the RA Legislation, some items that end up in trash cans cannot be considered waste, therefore, are treated the same way as items that have lost their original consumer intention.

== Waste Management Initiatives ==
Solid waste recovery is gaining popularity throughout different fields. As stated in the article, “Armenia is implementing major waste-management reforms” already, which is important because recycling has major economic, environmental, and health benefits.

As of 2019, there were more than 24 companies that recycle different types of waste, including 10 that recycle paper, 5 for plastic, 4 for glass, 5 for metals, and a few other smaller-sized organizations that recycle polyethylene. Clean Land is the first major company specializing in plastic and paper waste recycling, founded in 2009.

In 2021, a program of waste sorting was piloted in Yerevan. “... over 400 recycling bins were placed in 135 locations across Yerevan.” The Yerevan Municipality has also supported various ecological initiatives, such as the Green Green organization, which organizes cleanups, collects waste for recycling, and holds seminars, informing citizens of the importance of environmental issues.

Around 10 companies in Armenia produce wrapping paper, cardboard, and toilet paper, after recycling paper. However, some of those TP producers do not meet the sanitary requirements for recycling.

=== Reuse and Recycling ===
Starting May 2017 Innovative Solutions for Sustainable Development (ISSD) NGO is implementing waste management projects in Armenia ensuring the collection and recycling of Municipal Solid Waste in the involved communities. The biggest municipal solid waste management project of the NGO, "Recycle it," includes Yerevan, the capital city and has more than 500 partner organizations who recycle their waste within this project. The NGO organized more than 120 clean-ups and has more than 300,000 beneficiaries.

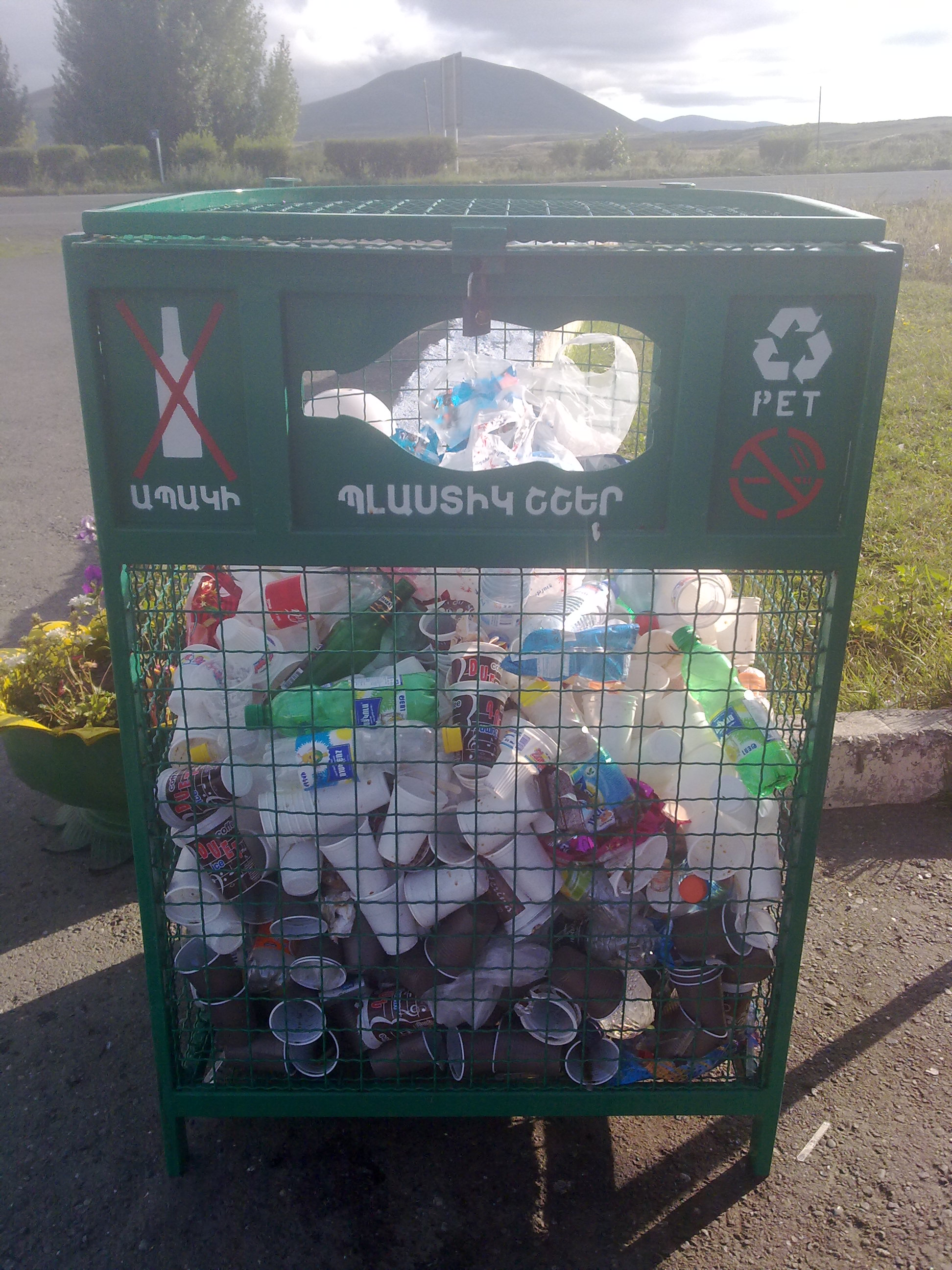
Waste container in Sevan

In recent years there have been several attempts initiated by public activists to address the waste management problem, such as the Toprak Petq Chi campaign (2016), translates as "I don't need a plastic bag",' that targets single-use plastic bags.

According to the Armenian Ministry of Environment the Armenian government has made additions to the Law "On Trade and Services" according to which the sale of single use plastic bags and sacks, their presence in retail trade facilities, will be banned since January 1 of 2027. For violation of this law, economic entities will receive a warning for first violation and will be fined 100,000-150,000 drams for repetitive violations.

Also recently, some recycling initiatives have started to take shape. Namely, Apaga, also known as ApagaCommunity CJSC, offers a paid pickup service, mirroring similar projects in more developed countries, though in these countries, recycling programs are taxpayer sponsored. Apaga enables individuals and organizations who take responsibility for their waste and want to participate, to voluntarily pay for a pickup service and get some rewards in return in the forms of discounts for individuals and green public relations (PR) for organizations.

In order to allow everyone to benefit from recycling, Apaga has also implemented new Smart Recycling Containers called SmartApaga Containers where anyone with their personal, unique QR code can dispose of their plastics and get ApagaCoins (in-app currency) to exchange for rewards from their rewards partners.

=== Hazardous Waste ===
There are 3 companies that hold permits from the Armenian Government to recycle lead batteries: Edmet, Metexim, and Minasyan Recycling Company. Yet, there is poor management of the process, that are usually mixed with household waste; thus, the hazardous components are not properly removed and can impact the environment.

=== Waste management in Yerevan ===
The municipal government of Yerevan, capital of Armenia, has made attempts to solve the problem for the city with a long term development plan, which includes three main phases:

1. In 2014, an international tender was announced for garbage collection. Two waste management companies were chosen: a Lebanese company called Sanitek, which was led by CEO Nicholas Tawil according to The Armenian Weekly; and two Armenian/Swedish Companies called Ecogroup and LL Miliconsult. Sanitek eventually secured a 10-year monopoly contract for all 12 districts of Yerevan after Ecogroup faced financial difficulties. However, in October 2019, Mayor Hayk Marutyan unilaterally terminated Sanitek's contract, citing service failures and the company's complete cessation of operations since August 2019.
2. In 2016 the Armenian parliament ratified a loan agreement signed with the European Bank for Reconstruction and Development (EBRD), for an €8 million loan to finance the construction of a solid waste landfill in Yerevan that will comply with EU regulations.
3. According to the municipal government of Yerevan, the next step is to introduce waste sorting and recycling practices with projects that meet European Union standards and regulations. In April 2019, the Yerevan municipality set up a public-run agency to gradually replace Sanitek, which effectively occurred in September 2019 with the arrival of new garbage trucks.
