= Against the Flow =

Against the Flow (Armenian: Հոսանքին Հակառակ) is an Armenian crime drama television series developed by Mher Mkrtchyan. The series premiered on Armenia 1 on September 25, 2017. The series main purpose is to find out who will go against the flow for principles and the common good. It was produced by Ruben Jaghinyan and Arman Mitoyan.

The series took place in Yerevan, Armenia.

== Cast and characters ==
- Babken Chobanyan portrays Armen
- Samvel Topalyan portrays Vova/Max
- Nazeni Hovhannisyan portrays Mary
- Samvel Tadevosyan portrays Tonikyan
- Ani Khachikyan portrays Lilith
- Aram Karakhanyan portrays Samvel Santrosyan
- Milena Avanesyan portrays Andgela
- Georgi Hovakimyan portrays Avet
- Artzrun Chobanyan portrays Karen
