= Super Mother 2 =

- Սուպեր մամա 2
- Directed by: Arman Marutyan; Vahagn Khachatryan
- Written by: Robert Martirosyan; Arman Marutyan
- Produced by: Hayk Marutyan; Sergey Harutyunyan
- Starring: Vigen Tadevosyan; Ani Vardanyan
- Production company: Kargin Studio
- Release date: 5 October 2017
- Country: Armenia
- Language: Armenian

Super Mother 2 (Armenian: Սուպեր մամա 2) is a 2017 Armenian adventure comedy film directed by Arman Marutyan and Vahagn Khachatryan and written by Marutyan and Robert Martirosyan. The film is a sequel to the 2015 film Super Mother and mostly has the same cast. The film was completed in 2017 and was available in Armenian theaters from October 5, 2017. In the Republic of Artsakh, the film premiered on October 8. The official trailer was uploaded by Kargin Studio to YouTube on September 16, 2017. Marutyan has also mentioned that the second movie is approximately twice more expensive than the first one.

== Plot ==
Karen and Sona continue their life together, however, Karen does not pay attention to his family. Sona's company's accountant steals a lot of money and manages to hide them. As Karen realizes that Sona may face criminal charges and possibly be imprisoned for the lost money, he hatches a plot to transform into Karine once more, tries everything to get the money back and reconcile with his wife. Menua, despite being the main villain of the first movie, helps Karen retrieve the money.

== Cast ==
- Hayk Marutyan as Karen and Karine Barseghyan
- Garik Papoyan as Menua and Monika
- Ani Khachikyan as Sona
- Levon Haroutyunyan as Shef
- Arman Martirosyan as Tigran
- Andranik Harutyunyan as Zoub
- Rafayel Yeranosyan as Zhme
- Arman Navasardyan as Ashot
- Eva Khachatryan as Syuzi
- Lili Elbakyan as Lilitik
- Arsine Navasardyan as Tsoghik
- Sepuh Apikyan as Manvel
- Hrach Muradyan as Vasak
- Inna Mamikonyan as Karchka
- Tatev Melqonyan as Hranush
- Ruzan Mesropyan as Seda
- Yelena Yesayan as Yeranuhi
- Ishkhan Gharibyan as Sargis
