= Super Mother =

- Directed by: Arman Marutyan; Vahagn Khachatrya
- Written by: Vardan Zadoyan; Hayk Marutyan
- Produced by: Arthur Baghiryan
- Starring: Hayk Marutyan; Ani Khachikyan
- Edited by: Hayk Marutyan
- Music by: Narek Ghaplanyan
- Production company: Kargin Studio
- Release date: March 8, 2015
- Country: Armenia
- Language: Armenian

Super Mother (Armenian: Սուպեր մամա) is an Armenian romantic comedy film written by Vardan Zadoyan and directed by Arman Marutyan and Vahagn Khachatryan, starring Hayk Marutyan and Ani Khachikyan. The film was completed in 2014 and was publicly released on March 8, 2015. The sequel, Super Mother 2, was released in 2017.

== Plot ==
A man (Karen) wants to earn some money. Randomly, he meets a boy named Tigran, with whom they agree on a deal. They pretend to be a mother and son to extort money from a famous organization, whom director is Sona.

== Cast ==
- Hayk Marutyan as Karen/Karine Barseghyan
- Garik Papoyan as Menua
- Ani Khachikyan as Sona
- Levon Haroutyunyan as Shef
- Samvel Sargsyan as Davit Sourenich
- Arman Martirosyan as Tigran
- Arpi Gabrielyan as Zara
- Andranik Harutyunyan as Zoub
- Rafayel Yeranosyan as Grandpa Zhme
- Arman Navasardyan as Ashot
- Armine Poghosyan as Noune
- Nerses Hovhannisyan as Tom
- Vruyr Harutyunyan as Usta Hrach
- Armen Sargsyan as Tyush
- Ashot Meloyan as Police officer
- Emma Baykova as little schoolgirl
- Astghik Poghosyan as little Karine
