= New Power (Armenia) =

Political party in Armenia

“New Power” Reformist Party «Նոր ուժ» ռեֆորմիստական կուսակցություն
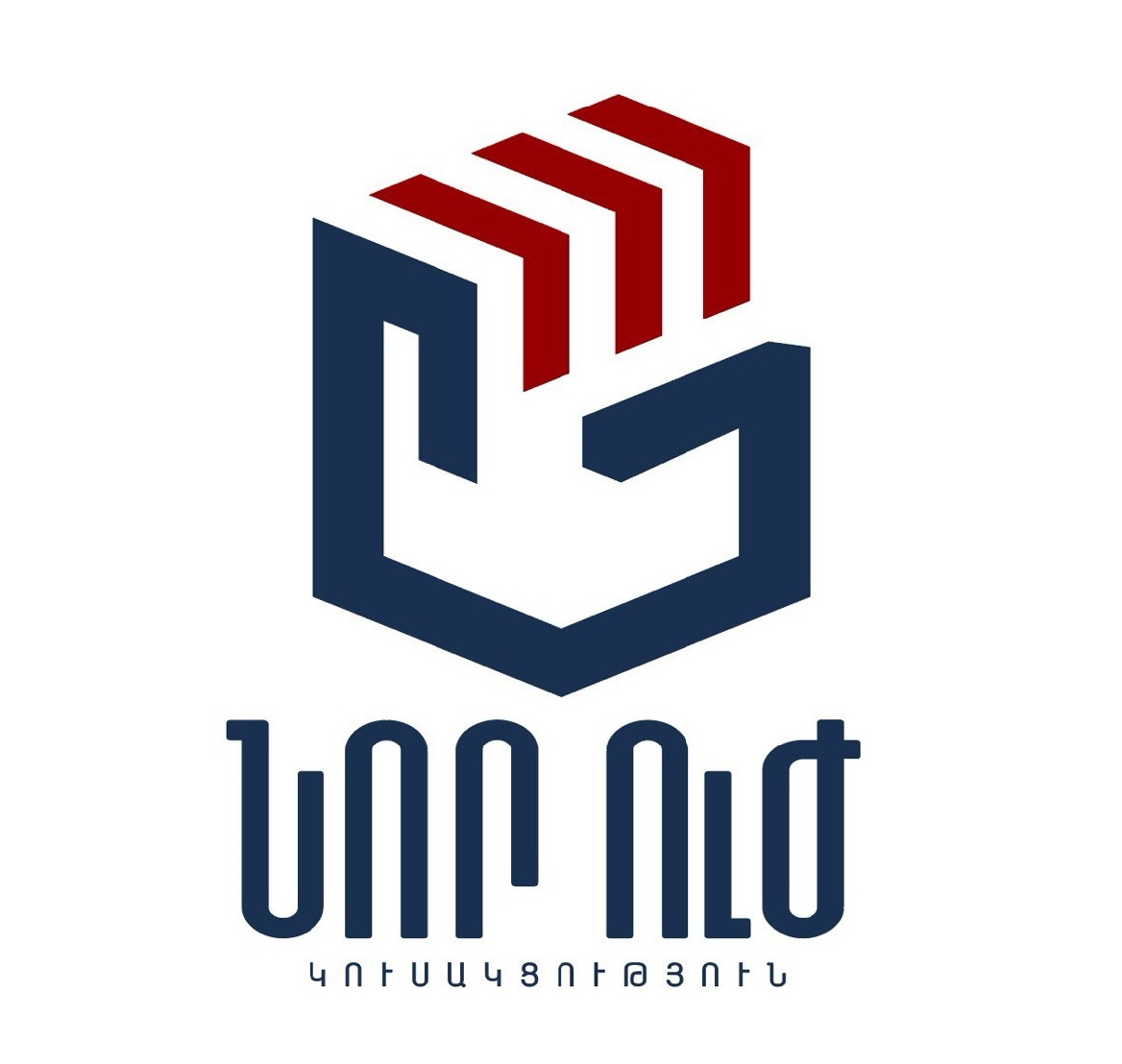
- Abbreviation: NPRP
- Leader: Hayk Marutyan
- President: Hayk Marutyan
- Founded: 1 May 2024
- Headquarters: Yerevan, Armenia
- Ideology: Social democracy Reformism; Pro-Europeanism
- Political position: Centre-left
- National Assembly: 0 / 107

Website
- newpower.am

“New Power” Reformist Party (Armenian: Նոր ուժ, romanized: Nor uzh), also known as New Force, is an Armenian political party that is headquartered in Yerevan. It is founded and led by the former Mayor of Yerevan, Hayk Marutyan.

== History ==
The party held its founding congress on 1 May 2024. Hayk Marutyan, a former member of Civil Contract, was nominated as party Chairman. Marutyan has been critical of prime minister Nikol Pashinyan's leadership and has called for the resignation of Pashinyan. Marutyan stated his intentions to possibly run in future elections. Marutyan also confirmed that the party may cooperate with the National Progress Party in the future.

During the 2024 Armenian protests, some speculated Marutyan and his party of cooperating with the opposition Armenia Alliance. However, on 6 August 2024, Marutyan stated that his political party would conduct operations separately from the Tavush for the Motherland movement.

The party has no political representation within the National Assembly and currently acts as an extra-parliamentary force.

== Ideology ==
The party is ideologically linked to European social democracy and supports Western values. "The party is social democratic, and we will cooperate with all forces sharing the same ideology. Meanwhile, we will not set restrictions on cooperation with forces that sincerely seek the development of the country," Marutyan told reporters. In regards to foreign policy, the party supports the expansion and deepening of integration programs with the European Union and with European countries in all possible directions and levels, as well as, the maintenance of cordial relations with Russia, the United States, India, and China. Marutyan also said, "We believe that Armenia and the Armenian people are inextricably linked with the European civilization by their value system."

The party also advocates for social justice, a strong welfare system, developing Armenia's free market economy, tackling corruption, strengthening relations with the Armenian Diaspora, and maintaining a balanced foreign policy.

== See also ==
- Programs of political parties in Armenia
