= Sanitek Armenia =

Armenian waste management company

Sanitek Armenia (Armenian: Սանիթեք Հայաստան) was a waste management company operating in Yerevan, Armenia, and a branch of Sanitek International Group, which was headquartered in Lebanon. Sanitek International was founded in September 2010 in Beirut by Nicholas Tawil, and Sanitek Armenia began operations in Yerevan in December 2014.

The company secured a 10-year monopoly contract to manage waste collection and sanitary cleaning for all 12 districts of Yerevan during the administration of former Mayor Taron Margaryan, in what was later described as "a legacy of Armenia's old regime" following the 2018 Velvet Revolution. After years of service quality issues and legal disputes, Yerevan Mayor Hayk Marutyan unilaterally terminated the contracts with Sanitek on October 3, 2019, citing systematic failures to fulfill contractual obligations and complete cessation of services since August 29, 2019.

== History ==
=== Founding and procurement (2010-2014) ===
Sanitek International was founded in Beirut, Lebanon in September 2010 by Nicholas Tawil. Prior to founding Sanitek, Tawil reportedly worked in defense contracting, including contracts with the United States Department of Defense in Iraq, Afghanistan, Africa, and Kuwait for approximately five years, followed by establishing defense contracting companies in Yemen and Beirut.

In 2013, the municipality of Yerevan, under Mayor Taron Margaryan, released an international tender for waste management services in the city. The tender sought to address what was described as a "long lasting problem of inappropriate and poor garbage collection institution" in Yerevan.

Sanitek initially won the tender for waste management services in half of Yerevan's districts, while another company named Ecogroup was awarded the contract for the remaining districts. According to Tawil, "Ecogroup had some financial troubles, and a retendering was issued, and we won that and got the rest of Yerevan." By December 2014, Sanitek had secured a 10-year monopoly contract for waste management services across all 12 districts of Yerevan.

Later investigations by Armenia's Anti-Corruption Committee would allege that the tender process was flawed, stating that Vahe Nikoyan, who was Deputy Mayor from January 20, 2012 to October 29, 2018, had "evaluated the applications of the participating companies as satisfactory despite the fact that they did not meet the qualification criteria."

=== Operations and expansion (2014-2018) ===
Sanitek began its operations in Yerevan in December 2014, initially with Madlen El Bolbol presented as the head of the Armenian branch. By August 2015, Nicholas Tawil had assumed a more prominent role in the company's public communications, and subsequently held the position of Partner and CEO of Sanitek Armenia.

The company reported an initial investment of 10 million euros and employed 150 workers to begin its operations in Yerevan. The company claimed that by the end of 2015, its investments would reach approximately 20 million euros, with projected employment of 1,100 people. By 2018, Tawil stated that the company employed 930 people in Armenia, though later reports would raise questions about the actual employment conditions.

Under its contract with the Yerevan municipality, Sanitek provided a range of waste management services, including sanitary cleaning, garbage collection, and winter maintenance. The company operated in all 12 administrative districts of Yerevan, including Arabkir, Nubarashen, Nor Nork, and Erebouni.

During this period, Sanitek was collecting waste and transferring it to the Nubarashen landfill, an open dump on the outskirts of Yerevan. In a 2018 interview, Tawil acknowledged that the company was not engaged in proper waste sorting or recycling operations, stating: "We send them to open dumps. [...] doing the whole process of recycling might cost up to a billion or two billion dollars, literally speaking."

The company faced early operational challenges. During summer 2015, mass protests known as Electric Yerevan occurred in Yerevan, with protesters using Sanitek's garbage bins as barricades, which the company claimed caused considerable damage. Additionally, in spring and summer 2016, the company made public appeals to residents not to burn or damage its bins in various districts of Yerevan.

=== Service deterioration and termination (2018-2019) ===
According to Mayor Hayk Marutyan, Sanitek's operations began deteriorating as early as 2017, with conditions worsening throughout 2018 and into 2019. The service quality issues became increasingly visible following the 2018 Velvet Revolution, with waste collection problems becoming a national issue. In September 2018, then-Prime Minister Nikol Pashinyan called the situation "unacceptable" during a Facebook livestream, describing it as a "consequence of the waste management monopoly" that was tarnishing the image of the "New Armenia."

In response to mounting public complaints, the Yerevan municipality twice fined Sanitek in spring 2019 for failing to fulfill its contractual obligations. The first fine amounted to 13 million drams (approximately $26,800) and the second to 26 million drams ($54,100). By summer 2019, the total fines had reached approximately 90 million drams (about $190,000).

In June 2019, the municipality commenced a formal study of Sanitek's operations, taking inventory of the company's equipment and evaluating conditions necessary for the appropriate implementation of the contract. The study reportedly found "systematic failure to perform waste collection, insufficient number of waste containers and their poor conditions, insufficient number of waste removal trucks, a clear breach of contractual obligations."

Sanitek CEO Nicholas Tawil defended the company's performance, blaming its difficulties on poor infrastructure and what he termed "excessive damage" to its equipment. In a July 2019 press conference, which was initially planned to be held in Tbilisi, Georgia due to what Tawil described as "aggressive administrative pressure," he called investigations into the company "illegal, groundless and politically motivated." Tawil offered to invest four million US dollars into new equipment if the municipality would improve infrastructure at the Nubarashen landfill.

The crisis reached its peak when Sanitek completely ceased providing services from August 29, 2019. In response, Mayor Marutyan stated that the municipality would "clean up Yerevan with or without Sanitek" and began acquiring garbage trucks to ensure waste collection could continue.

On October 3, 2019, Mayor Marutyan announced via Facebook the unilateral termination of Yerevan's contract with Sanitek. In his announcement, he cited the systematic failures documented in the municipality's study, as well as the company's complete cessation of services and lack of mandated insurance as stipulated in the contract. He also referenced the "incorrect assessment of specialized expertise and financial resources qualifications under the law on procurement at the time of signing the contract"—an apparent reference to the irregularities in the original tender process.

On October 10, 2019, Sanitek International released a statement claiming that "the overriding objective of the city authorities was to damage [Sanitek's] activities by all possible means" and that the Armenian state "is unable to ensure the exercise of the right to a fair trial by a foreign investor."

== Corruption investigations ==
=== Tender process irregularities ===
In December 2022, Armenia's Anti-Corruption Committee revealed findings from its preliminary investigation into the tender process that had awarded Sanitek its waste management contract. The investigation found that Vahe Nikoyan, who was Deputy Mayor of Yerevan from January 20, 2012 to October 29, 2018, had "abused his official position" during his tenure.

According to the investigation, Nikoyan, who chaired the commissions for tenders organized to acquire garbage collection and sanitation services, "evaluated the applications of the participating companies as satisfactory despite the fact that they did not meet the qualification criteria." This finding directly challenged the legitimacy of the original procurement process that had awarded Sanitek its monopoly contract.

The investigation revealed that after contracts were signed with Sanitek and its affiliated companies in 2015 and 2016, Nikoyan "did not monitor the full scope and proper implementation of services and approved requests to transfer money for services not provided." The Anti-Corruption Committee alleged that these failures in oversight resulted in the Yerevan Municipality paying more than 3 billion AMD to Sanitek and its affiliated companies for "garbage collection and sanitary cleaning services that were not actually performed."

On August 1, 2023, the Prosecutor's Office initiated public criminal prosecution against Nikoyan, expanding on the earlier findings. The prosecution alleged that "in the conditions of not meeting the standards of the tenders announced for the purpose of obtaining long-term garbage collection and sanitary cleaning services," Nikoyan had evaluated the bids as satisfactory, resulting in Sanitek's companies being recognized as winners despite lacking "technical, financial, professional and labor resources" to properly provide the services.

=== Property rental scheme ===
Both the Anti-Corruption Committee's investigation and the Prosecutor's subsequent criminal case detailed an alleged scheme involving property rentals between Sanitek and the family of Deputy Mayor Nikoyan. According to the findings, shortly after signing the contracts with Sanitek in 2015 and 2016, "Lease agreements were signed between 'Sanitech International' LLC and Yerevan Deputy Mayor V.N.'s father on providing for rent the three premises in Yerevan which belong to the latter, for the sum in Armenian drams equivalent of 1000-6000 USD per month."

The August 2023 prosecution filing provided more specific details, stating that Nikoyan had "received a bribe from the authorized officials of the mentioned company, accepting the offer to receive a particularly large property benefit for his father." The prosecution claimed that the real estate registered in the name of Nikoyan's father was leased to Sanitek companies for "a rent far exceeding the amount of lease payments given before that moment: 436 million 472 thousand 280 AMD."

According to the Prosecutor's Office, from 2015-2019—the period when Nicholas Tawil served as CEO of Sanitek—Nikoyan "actually received about 141 million 273 thousand 953 AMD of property benefit... as a bribe in the form of other advantages for his father." This arrangement allegedly led to Nikoyan, "based on material and group interests, using his official position," not performing his official duties and not supervising the implementation of works by Sanitek.

=== Tax issues ===
In February 2019, Armenia's State Revenue Committee (SRC) initiated a criminal case against Sanitek on charges of tax evasion on an especially large scale under Article 205 of the RA Criminal Code. According to the SRC's Deputy Chairman Edward Hovhannisyan, Sanitek International LLC and the Armenian branch of Sanitek LLC collectively owed approximately 600 million drams to the Armenian state.

The SRC reported that Sanitek International LLC had failed to pay 299,918,392 drams in Value Added Tax (VAT) for the period of January-September 2018, while the Armenian branch of Sanitek LLC had unpaid taxes amounting to 280,429,121 drams. The tax dispute centered on Sanitek's classification of waste transport as cargo transportation, which the SRC argued was subject to VAT. According to Hovhannisyan, "sanitations of territories or snow removal are subject to VAT. We believe that transport of waste should not be considered as cargo transportation. In addition, the activities of the transport of waste company do not meet the criteria for cargo transportation."

The SRC also noted that the company was in arrears regarding environmental tax payments, and announced that Sanitek International LLC and the Yerevan branch of Sanitek LLC would face complex tax audits. These tax issues emerged during the period when Nicholas Tawil was CEO of Sanitek, though the company has disputed the SRC's characterization of its tax obligations.

== Labor issues ==
While Sanitek represented itself as a major employer in Yerevan, with CEO Nicholas Tawil claiming in 2018 that the company employed 930 people in Armenia with minimum monthly salaries of $500, employees raised significant concerns about pay, working conditions, and contractual arrangements during the company's operations in Armenia.

=== Wage and contract disputes ===
In 2019, Sanitek employees protested over unpaid wages. Armenian newspaper Joghovourd reported that several employees claimed they had not signed formal work contracts with the company, with one employee stating: "We haven't signed any work contract since we started working for Sanitek - that is, a year and a half ago. It is the same for most Sanitek employees. We are not convinced by the company's promises to hire."

While the company claimed to pay minimum monthly salaries of $500, multiple employees reported earning significantly less. According to interviews conducted by OpenDemocracy, several Sanitek employees claimed to earn around $100 per month for a 12-hour workday—though this was still reportedly twice as much as the average Armenian pension of $40, based on Armstat data.

=== Working conditions ===
Employees also raised concerns about their working conditions. A female cleaning agent working for Sanitek told reporters: "I work day or night shifts. At night, it is dangerous with the traffic: we work on the side of the road. My wage is low, with no insurance, but it is better than retirement."

In June 2018, several female Sanitek workers sent a letter to Prime Minister Nikol Pashinyan outlining multiple labor violations. In the letter, they claimed that they "did not receive their salary as provided in their contracts, could not take annual leave nor the required four days of rest during the month, did not know how much territory they were supposed to clean, and did not receive overtime pay for night work."

When asked about these labor issues by OpenDemocracy, Sanitek declined to comment on the pay and working conditions of its employees.

== Environmental impact ==
=== Nubarashen landfill conditions ===
Throughout Sanitek's tenure as Yerevan's waste management provider, the company disposed of collected waste at the Nubarashen landfill, a 52-hectare dumping site on the outskirts of Yerevan. This facility, which received all of Yerevan's trash, was widely known for failing to adhere to international standards of sanitation. Nicholas Tawil acknowledged in a 2018 interview: "No, we send them [the collected waste] to open dumps."

While the municipality owned the Nubarashen site, it had been privatized in 2001 and was operated by a private company called Clean Erebuni. According to reports, Sanitek paid a monthly fee to Clean Erebuni based on the amount of waste dumped, while Clean Erebuni paid approximately $60,000 in monthly rent to the Yerevan municipality.

Local residents reported significant issues with the landfill's operations. One resident living near Nubarashen told reporters: "We have to close our windows during the summer because of the waste smell. There have been fires also, I can see them from my apartment. I have no clue what the authorities are doing about it." The report also noted that people were regularly seen picking through plastic on the landfill to sell to private businesses, with neither the municipality nor Clean Erebuni monitoring this activity.

=== Environmental risks ===
With 9.5 million tonnes of waste on site, experts identified Nubarashen as an increasing environmental risk. Harutyun Alpetyan of the American University of Armenia's Acopian Center for the Environment noted that the piles of rubbish had created a river below them: "These waste waters are going directly to the ground waters, which can go everywhere." Another researcher at the center, Sofia Manukyan, highlighted the risk of uncontrolled fires due to chemical reactions in the waste.

Despite these significant environmental concerns, the contract between Yerevan Municipality and Clean Erebuni reportedly did not cover environmental risks. According to Artak Ayvazyan, head of Clean Erebuni, the company's primary waste management practice was to regularly "cover the waste with soil to bury it."

A 2010 UN Convention to Combat Desertification report estimated that the total annual cost of land degradation in Armenia was approximately $71 million, leading to the "deterioration in food availability, soil fertility, carbon sequestration capacity, wood production, groundwater recharge" with "significant social and economic costs to the country." No comprehensive study had been conducted on the specific impact of waste on public health in Armenia.

=== Lack of waste sorting and recycling ===
Throughout its operations in Yerevan, Sanitek did not implement waste sorting or recycling programs, despite these services being mentioned in their contract. In his 2018 interview, Tawil acknowledged that recycling was "economically not viable" due to Armenia's geographical isolation and transportation costs.

Beyond Nubarashen, Armenia had over 300 unregulated garbage dumps at the time, and there were no proper waste management policies that complied with strict environmental standards. The waste crisis extended well beyond Yerevan, with no sanitary landfills operating in the country at that time, though plans to allocate 25 million euros in grants and loans toward the construction of one had been announced.

== Legal aftermath ==
=== Arbitration threats ===
Following the termination of its contract with Yerevan municipality, Sanitek threatened to pursue international arbitration against Armenia. In August 2019, while still holding the waste management contract, the company indicated it might "apply for international arbitration to resolve its dispute with the Yerevan municipality."

After its contract was terminated in October 2019, Sanitek issued a statement claiming that the Armenian state "is unable to ensure the exercise of the right to a fair trial by a foreign investor." In its press release, the company announced it would start "pre-arbitration" contacts with the Armenian government, while indicating it was not "shutting the door for continued negotiations with the municipality in order to find a mutually acceptable and optimal solution."

=== Official investigations and prosecutions ===
The tax evasion investigation initiated by Armenia's State Revenue Committee in February 2019 continued after the termination of Sanitek's contract. The investigation, conducted under Article 205 of the RA Criminal Code, focused on tax evasion "on an especially large scale." In August 2019, an SRC official confirmed that complex tax audits of both Sanitek International LLC and the Yerevan branch of Sanitek LLC had been appointed.

The most significant legal developments came from the investigation into the corruption surrounding the original tender process. In December 2022, the Anti-Corruption Committee initiated a criminal case against former Deputy Mayor Vahe Nikoyan for abuse of official position. The investigation expanded on August 1, 2023, when the Prosecutor's Office initiated public criminal prosecution against Nikoyan for both abuse of official powers and receiving a bribe in a particularly large amount.

While the criminal investigation focused primarily on Nikoyan's actions, the prosecution's findings directly implicated Sanitek's business practices during Nicholas Tawil's leadership as CEO. The prosecution alleged that "authorized officials" of Sanitek had offered Nikoyan a bribe in the form of inflated property rental payments to his father. According to the prosecution, this arrangement resulted in Sanitek receiving favorable treatment despite failing to meet contractual obligations, with the Yerevan Municipality paying "more than 3 billion 200 thousand AMD for incomplete, improper, and in some cases also not provided services."

=== Nicholas Tawil's response ===
Throughout the various investigations and after the contract termination, Nicholas Tawil consistently denied wrongdoing and characterized the actions against Sanitek as politically motivated. In July 2019, during a press conference in Yerevan, Tawil called the SRC investigation "illegal, groundless and politically motivated."

Tawil maintained that Sanitek's difficulties stemmed from poor infrastructure and excessive damage to its equipment, rather than any failure on the company's part. He offered to invest four million dollars in new equipment if the municipality would address what he described as infrastructure problems at the Nubarashen landfill.

No public statements from Tawil appear to have been made following the 2022-2023 corruption investigations that implicated Sanitek in the alleged bribery scheme with former Deputy Mayor Nikoyan.
