= Hrachya Sargsyan =

Armenian politician

- Հրաչյա Սարգսյան

59th Mayor of Yerevan
- In office 22 December 2021 – 17 March 2023
- Preceded by: Hayk Marutyan
- Succeeded by: Tigran Avinyan

Personal details
- Born: 13 February 1985 (age 41) Yerevan, Armenian SSR, Soviet Union
- Party: My Step Alliance (2018–2021)
- Occupation: politician

Hrachya Sargsyan (Armenian: Հրաչյա Սարգսյան; born February 13, 1985) is an Armenian politician.

== Political career ==
He was the mayor of Yerevan from 22 December 2021 to 17 March 2023. He was elected as a member of the My Step Alliance. He was elected Deputy Mayor per snap elections of Yerevan City Council on 23 September 2018 for the My Step Alliance, and was appointed deputy mayor in October 2018. Sargsyan became Mayor on 22 December 2021 when incumbent mayor Hayk Marutyan lost a no confidence vote.

Hrachya Sargsyan stepped down as mayor on 17 March 2023. The position was vacant until 10 October 2023, when Tigran Avinyan took office as mayor.

Political offices
Preceded by Hayk Marutyan	Mayor of Yerevan; 2021–2023	Succeeded by Tigran Avinyan
