= Nikolay Tsaturyan =

Armenian theatre director, actor and playwright (1945–2026)

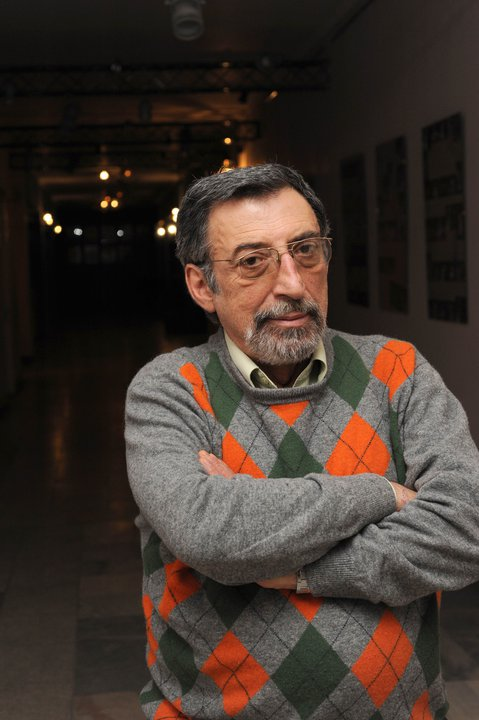
Nikolay Tsaturyan

Nikolay Yervandi Tsaturyan (Armenian: Նիկոլայ Երվանդի Ծատուրյան; 8 January 1945 – 14 May 2026) was an Armenian theatre director, actor and playwright who was a People's Artist of Armenia (2011). He was the Artistic Director of Vardan Ajemian State Drama Theatre of Gyumri.

== Life and career ==
Nikolay Tsaturyan was born in Yerevan on 8 January 1945, a son of film director Ervand Tsatouryan. He studied at the Yerevan Institute of Theater and Fine Arts with Marat Marinosyan, and Vardan Ajemian, whom he considered to be his "maestro". Tsaturyan identified as an atheist. He also studied at Moscow High Courses for Scriptwriters and Film Directors with Georgi Danelia.

He worked at Hayfilm, then assisted Yuli Raizman at Mosfilm. He was the director of Sundukyan State Academic Theatre of Yerevan, the founder of "Metro" theatre. He is also well known for his leading role at "Comrade Panjouni" film.

Throughout his career Tsaturyan directed nearly 100 plays, shows and events, among them Vahagn Davtyan's "Apricot Tree" (1939), William Saroyan's "The Time of Your Life", Alexander Ostrovsky's "Crazy Money", Alexander Vampilov's "The Elder Son" (Старший сын), Hrant Margarian's & Nikolay Tsaturyan's "And Three Chairs Fell From Heaven" (1991) (Եվ երկինքեն երեք աթոռ ինկան), which won "Audience Award" at Armenian Diaspora Theater Festival in 1991, Anahit Aghasaryan's and Nikolay Tsaturyan's "Save Our Souls" (1990) (Փրկեք մեր հոգիները), which won best direction, best lead actor, best supporting actress, Gabriel Sundukyan's "Power of Money" (Փուղի զորութինը).

Tsaturyan died on 14 May 2026, at the age of 81.
