= With the Whole Family =

With the Whole Family (Armenian: Ընտանյոք հանդերձ, Entanyoq handertz) is an Armenian comedy drama television series developed by Hrachya Zakaryan. The series premiered on Armenia 1 on October 12, 2015. The series takes place in Yerevan, Armenia.

Armenia 1 presents a project for film lovers. The events of the new sitcom With the Whole Family develop around the Yerevan family of Sanayans. The only man of the family David is still single and that fact gives no rest to his mother Aida and aunt Nazik. They are looking for a suitable bride for David, when it turns out that he has already found his future wife Mary on his own.
