= Ani Khachikyan (actress) =

Armenian actress and presenter

- Born: Ani Khachikyan; June 4, 1993 (age 32)
- Education: Yerevan State Institute of Theatre and Cinematography
- Occupations: Actress, presenter
- Years active: 2011–present
- Spouse: Hayk Barseghyan (Divorced)

Ani Khachikyan (Armenian: Անի Խաչիկյան) is an Armenian actress and presenter. She is known for her roles as Sona on Super Mother and on its sequel Super Mother 2.

== Filmography ==
Film
Year	Title	Role	Notes
2015	"Super Mother" (Սուպեր մամա)	Sona	Lead Role
2016	"The Line" (Կյանք ու կռիվ, Life and Fight)	Anna	
2017	"Super Mother 2" (Սուպեր մամա 2)	Sona	

Television and web
Year	Title	Role	Notes
2011-2012	School of Angels (Հրեշտակների դպրոցը)		Recurring Role
2012-2013	Tigran's Planet (Տիգրանի մոլորակը)	Mary	Main Cast
2015	Bakhtaber (Բախտաբեր)	Inga	TV-Series
2015	Special Section (Հատուկ բաժին)		Recurring Role
2017	Against the Flow (Հոսանքին հակառակ)	Lilith	Main Role
2022	Live With Me (Ապրիր ինձ հետ)	Lina	Main Role
