= Taron Margaryan =

Armenian politician

- Տարոն Մարգարյան
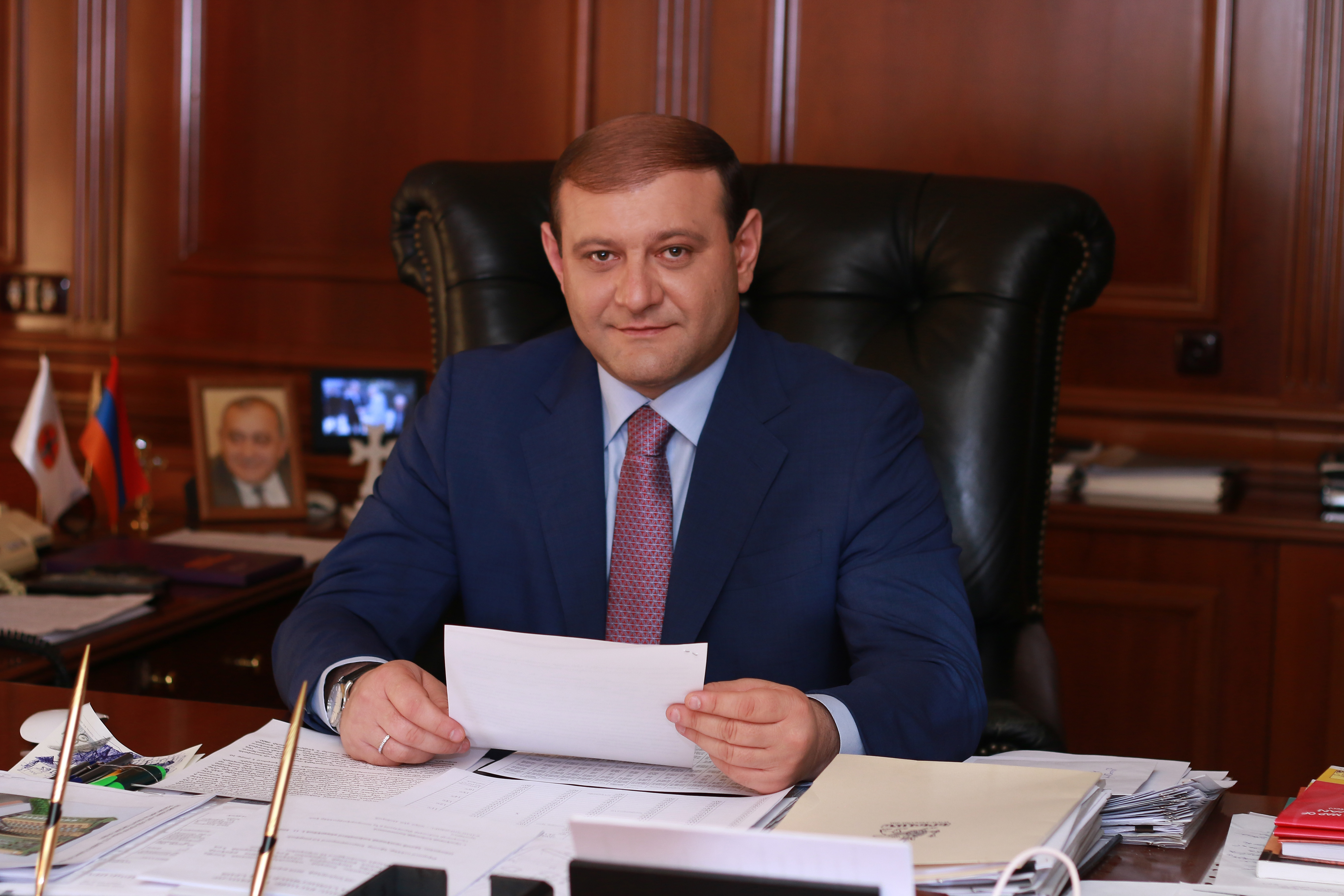
- Margaryan in 2016

57th Mayor of Yerevan
- In office 15 November 2011 – 9 July 2018
- Preceded by: Karen Karapetyan
- Succeeded by: Kamo Areyan (acting)

Personal details
- Born: 17 April 1978 (age 47) Yerevan, Armenian SSR, Soviet Union
- Party: Republican Party
- Spouse: Married
- Children: a daughter and five sons
- Occupation: politician

Taron Andraniki Margaryan (Armenian: Տարոն Անդրանիկի Մարգարյան, born 17 April 1978) is a politician from Armenia. He was the 11th mayor of Yerevan from 2011 to 2018.

== Head of community and early career ==
From 2001 to 2003, he worked as a leading specialist for Armenia's State Committee of Real Estate Cadastre in the territorial unit of Nor Nork, and later became the head of the department.

In 2003, he was appointed the Deputy Head of the Ministry of Bioresources Management Agency. In 2005, he was elected at the age of 27 as head of the district of Avan in the city of Yerevan and was re-elected in 2008 for a second term.

During Margaryan's two terms in office, the district of Avan was recognized by Armenia as the best district for two years in a row. In 2009, he was elected as a member of Yerevan's City Council and in the same year was elected as Yerevan's first Deputy Mayor.

== Mayor of Yerevan ==
Taron Margaryan has served as the mayor of Yerevan since 15 November 2011 after being elected by the City Council and succeeded Karen Karapetyan after his resignation.

In 2013, he earned a position at the top of the list of candidates for the Republican Party of Armenia's 2013 municipal elections with the leading slogan "Better Yerevan."

Following the results of the election that took place on 5 May 2013, Armenia's Central Electoral Commission (CEC) announced that the City Council members have been elected from the RA's list of Yerevan's 42 members from the City Council, 17 members from Yerevan's "Prosperous Armenia" party, and 6 members from the "Hello Yerevan" party's electoral bloc list.

After Nikol Pashinyan became prime minister of Armenia during the velvet revolution in April 2018, city hall was raided and the Yerevan Fund which Margaryan was head of was implicated in large-scale corrupt practices. Then a video came out highlighting Margaryan's vast and undeclared wealth and businesses which received widespread attention and well over a hundred thousand views. Finally, on 9 July 2018, the embattled Margaryan tendered his resignation as mayor of Yerevan.

== Main activities ==
After being elected mayor, Taron Margaryan announced his strategy for the balanced development of Yerevan.

During his years in office, all administrative regions of schools specializing in sports or the arts were built and reconstructed, libraries were renovated, heating systems in schools and kindergartens were updated, and children who were residents of Yerevan were given the opportunity to attend kindergarten free of charge.

Additionally, in 2013 Taron Margaryan launched an initiative at the Yerevan Zoo, which heretofore had not had any work or improvements done since opening. The zoo now spans 7 by 16 hectares and renovations cost approximately 1 million AMD (US$2,100). Furthermore, in cooperation with the private sector, all districts in Yerevan had public parks built or rebuilt.

Taron Margaryan's years in office were marked by extensive road construction. Together with the Asian Development Bank, bypassing roads in Yerevan were constructed to ease and reduce city traffic. His leadership was also of use with the construction of a connecting street between Leningradyan street and Admiral Isakov street, as well as the Leningradyan-Kievyan road junction. He was also active in the construction of the connecting road between Ulnetsi street and Rubinyants street. Furthermore, Taron Margaryan's years in office were also marked by a complete modernization and transition to LED lighting systems from the former Soviet-era lighting systems.

Since his early years in office, Taron Margaryan spoke about the need for active information technology and the need for the active use of electronic control systems. Furthermore, in March 2016 Margaryan held a conference with the citizens of RA, receiving nearly 100 questions within 24 hours.

In 2014, the prestigious Rutgers University of Public Affairs and Administration E-School Institute located in the United States rated Yerevan as one of the fastest-growing cities in the world. The overall index listed Seoul as the leading city of the world, followed by New York, Hong Kong, Singapore, and Yerevan.

== Problems and criticism ==
Taron Margaryan's leadership is most often criticized due to architectural issues, especially in regards to the demolition of old buildings. Particularly, the central "Closed Market" or "Pak Shuka" and the demolition of No. 1 Printing building which was brought down by a method of blasting. In the latter case, although the building's privatization and construction permit existed before Taron Margaryan took office, the community nonetheless criticized the municipality for failing to prevent the destruction.

Taron Margaryan has also often been criticized by residents for transportation issues, especially in regards to the discussions of raising of transportation fees. Hence, in 2013, plans to raise transportation fees to 150 AMD were suspended after the mayor's orders. Furthermore, since 2013 Taron Margaryan has also been criticized for the problems in the field of waste management in the city of Yerevan. In response, the municipality awarded a ten-year waste management contract to Sanitek, a Lebanese company that began operations in Yerevan in December 2014. According to The Armenian Weekly, Nicholas Tawil served as CEO of the company during this period. The company initially replaced garbage containers and implemented scheduled garbage collection services. However, the contract was later terminated in October 2019 by Mayor Hayk Marutyan, citing service failures.

Numerous protests took place during Taron Margaryan's first few years in office on behalf of residents living in buildings considered to be dangerous of the 4th-category. They voiced their concerns in front of City Hall. In December 2015, Taron Margaryan handed out keys to new apartments to residents living in the dormitories located on Sisakyan 3, 4, and 127/1, Nor Aresh 35, Artsakh Street 10/2. The latter was the last phase of the resettlement program for families living in category-4 dangerous buildings.

As a result of the resettlement program, a total of 650 families were relocated to new apartments. Residents of damaged houses were resettled in the following addresses: 4 Northern 4th Lane No. 15, Bryussov St. 66th home, 4th Lane of Artsakh, and apartments located on 10/5 and 10/2.

Taron Margaryan was also criticized by the press for not having served in the army. However, Markaryan's mandatory military service was dismissed due to the fact that he already had 3 children upon graduating university. Taron Margaryan also initiated programs meant to strengthen army-society ties. Since the past few years, permission has been granted for parents in Yerevan to visit their children serving in the army twice a year. Such programs also aid in providing housing for the families of killed soldiers and freedom fighters.

During Taron Margaryan's years in office, he intensified Yerevan's international relations with other neighboring and capital cities, organizing mutual visits regularly. Moreover, Yerevan has 24 sister cities. Sister cities are included in the scope of cooperation in trade, science, technology, culture, health, tourism, construction, and other industries.

== Awards ==
- "Homeland Award for Rendered Services" 1st degree Medal (2016);
- On behalf of the president of the Republic of Nagorno-Kharabagh, "Mesrop Mashtots" Medal (2016);
- On behalf of the RA Ministry of Education and Science, the highest award "Gold Medal" (2016);
- "Little Mher’s" Educational Complex "Haykazunakan Glory" Medal (2016);
- The rector of the Armenian State Pedagogical University, "Khachatur Abovyan" gold Medal (2015);
- "Patron of the Arts' Medal of Honor of Theatre and Film Institute (2015);
- Armenian General Benevolent Union (AGBU) Gold Medal (2015);
- The chairman of the investigation committee, "Cooperation" Medal (2015)
- Chamber of Commerce Gold Medal (2015);
- The Ministry of Agriculture, "Achievement in Agriculture" Gold Medal (2015);
- Avetik Isahakyan Central Library, "Avetik Isahakyan" Medal (2015);
- RA Minister of Emergency Situations, Ministry of Emergency Situations "Honorary Worker" medal (2014)
- The Minister of Justice, the "Shahamir Shahamirian" Medal of the Ministry of Justice (2014);
- Granted by The Ministry of Defense, "Defense Army" Medal (2014);
- On behalf of the International Council of Museums (ICOM) "For Service to Fatherland" 2nd degree Medal (2013);
- "Anania Shirakatsi" Medal (2008);
- On behalf of The Ministry of Defense, "Garegin Nzhdeh" (2008) and "Andranik Ozanyan" (2011) Medals;
- The National Assembly of the RA NA Medal of Honor (2011);
- Yerevan Mayor's Gold Medal (2008);
- Gold Medal from the Agrarian University of Armenia;
- Fridtjof Nansen "Mountainous Armenian Eagle" Gold Medal;
- On behalf of Yerkrapah Volunteer Union "Vazgen Sargsyan" Medal;
- "The Union of Communities of Armenia" Golden Service Medal for significant personal contributions to the development of local democracy in Armenia.

== Family and personal life ==
Being the only son of the Republic of Armenia's former Prime Minister Andranik Margaryan, Taron Margaryan is married to Gohar Sargsyan, the sister of Republic of Armenia's Parliamentary member Robert Sargsyan. Taron Margaryan has 6 children, 5 sons and 1 daughter. Generally, Taron Margaryan's family does not engage in public activism. However, Margaryan's wife, Gohar Sargsyan, annually gives out presents on 7 April, recognized as the day of mothers and beauty, to expecting mothers.

== Financial capability ==
According to the declaration submitted to the Ethics Committee, as of 2016, Taron Margaryan has 250 million AMD, translating to about 500k USD and 500k EUR.

According to various sources, Taron Margaryan lives in his private home in the region of Avan in Yerevan.

== Social activity and charity ==
Since 2005, served as the Football Federation executive committee member and chairman of the Football Committee of the Mass.

In 2010, was elected as member of the Yerkrapah Volunteer Union on 18 February 2012 during their 9th meeting and was then reelected in 2014 at the 10th meeting.

Since 2012, served as chairman of the Board of the Polytechnic University. Additionally, established a scholarship named after Taron Margaryan's father titled the, "Andranik Margarian Scholarship" which is awarded every year.

Since 2014, serves as the President of the Chess Federation and as a result, aided in the construction of 11 new chess schools in all administrative districts of Yerevan.

== Reference list ==
Political offices
Preceded by Karen Karapetyan	Mayor of Yerevan; 2011–2018	Succeeded by Kamo Areyan (acting)
