= List of Eurovision Song Contest entries (2004–present) =

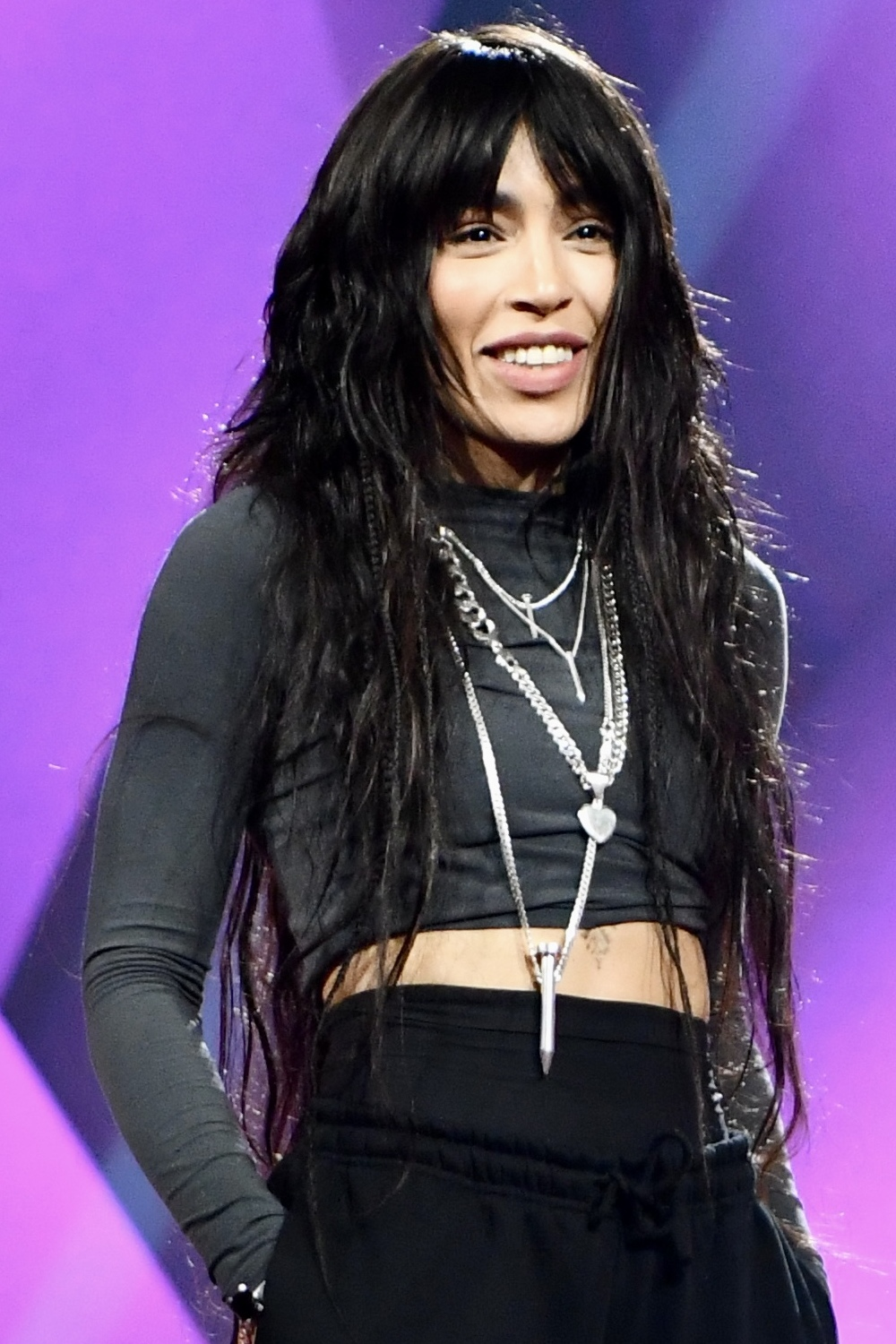
Loreen brought Sweden its fifth and seventh win in 2012 and 2023 respectively, making her the second performer to win the contest twice after Johnny Logan, and the first female performer to win twice.

Over 1,700 entries have been submitted into the Eurovision Song Contest since it began in 1956, comprising songs and artists which have represented fifty-two countries. The contest, organised by the European Broadcasting Union (EBU), is held annually between members of the union, with participating broadcasters from different countries submitting songs to the event and casting votes to determine the most popular in the competition. From an original seven participating countries in the first edition, around forty entries are now regularly submitted into the competition every year.

Principally open to active member broadcasters of the EBU, eligibility to participate in the contest is not determined by geographic inclusion within the traditional boundaries of Europe. Several countries from outside of Europe have previously submitted entries into the contest, including countries in Western Asia and North Africa, as well as transcontinental countries with only part of their territory in Europe. Australia, a country in Oceania, made its first contest appearance in 2015 when SBS, an EBU associate member broadcaster from the country, received an invitation to submit an entry to mark the contest's 60th anniversary.

Each year a date is typically set by which time broadcasters may announce to the EBU their intent to participate in the contest, which can be revoked condition-free up to this deadline date. However, on several occasions over its history, entries which had been submitted into the contest by the participating broadcasters following the cut-off date, or which were planned to be submitted, have subsequently not gone ahead. This can occur for varying reasons, including disqualification for breaking the rules of the contest or through withdrawal by the broadcasters themselves. On a number of occasions participation has also been suggested or attempted in countries which are precluded from entering the contest, due to a lack of EBU member broadcaster or for other reasons.

Germany has made the most contest appearances, participating in all but one event since its founding. Morocco conversely has participated the fewest times, competing only once in 1980. Ireland and Sweden both hold the record for the most victories, having won the contest seven times, including four Irish wins in the 1990s. In addition to its five contest wins, the United Kingdom has also placed second sixteen times – more than any other country – and also holds the record for the most consecutive contest appearances, competing in every edition since 1959. Although it has also achieved three contest wins, Norway holds the record for the most last-place finishes in the contest's history, having featured at the bottom of the scoreboard of the final twelve times.

Contests
1950s							1956	1957	1958	1959
1960s	1960	1961	1962	1963	1964	1965	1966	1967	1968	1969
1970s	1970	1971	1972	1973	1974	1975	1976	1977	1978	1979
1980s	1980	1981	1982	1983	1984	1985	1986	1987	1988	1989
1990s	1990	1991	1992	1993	1994	1995	1996	1997	1998	1999
2000s	2000	2001	2002	2003	2004	2005	2006	2007	2008	2009
2010s	2010	2011	2012	2013	2014	2015	2016	2017	2018	2019
2020s	~~2020~~	2021	2022	2023	2024	2025	2026			
Entries which failed to qualify; 1956–2003; Withdrawn and disqualified entries; 1956–2003; 2004–present

== Entries ==
The following tables list the entries which have been performed at the contest since the introduction of semi-finals in 2004. Entries are listed by order of their first performance in the contest; entry numbers provide a cumulative total of all songs performed at the contest throughout its history, and a second cumulative total outlines the total entries for each country. For each individual year placings for each entry in that year's final are shown, with placings in the contest's semi-final(s) shown in brackets. Songs which were performed multiple times are shown only once in each table, with separate columns showing the running order for each entry in that year's semi-final(s) and final.

Only songs which have competed in the contest final or in the semi-finals are considered contest entries. Submitted entries for the ultimately cancelled 2020 contest are also excluded from this list for the purposes of calculating cumulative totals for entry numbers and country totals.

In line with the official Eurovision Song Contest records, the 1992 entry which represented the Federal Republic of Yugoslavia, subsequently renamed Serbia and Montenegro in 2003, is considered to have represented Yugoslavia rather than Serbia and Montenegro; Serbia and Montenegro is therefore considered to have made its first appearance in 2004.

Table key

1 Winner – Winning entries in each edition of the contest
2 Second place – Entries which came second in each edition of the contest
3 Third place – Entries which came third in each edition of the contest
◁ Last place – Entries which came last in each edition of the contest
† Semi-final qualifier – Entries which qualified for the final by placing within the top 10 in each edition's semi-final(s)
‡ Back-up jury selection – Entries which qualified for the final as the back-up juries' highest-placed country which had failed to place in the top 9 countries (2008–2009)
DNQ Did not qualify – Entries which did not qualify for the final
— Did not compete – Entries which did not compete in the respective show, due to automatic qualifier status or a non-qualifying semi-finalist
DSQ Disqualified – Entries which had already competed in a show, but which were subsequently disqualified before the completion of the competition
* Semi-final 1 – Entries which competed in the first semi-final of that year's contest (2008–present)
** Semi-final 2 – Entries which competed in the second semi-final of that year's contest (2008–present)
◊ Did not perform – Entries which had competed in a semi-final and qualified for the final, and which had been assigned a running order position, but did not perform due to disqualification

=== 2000s ===
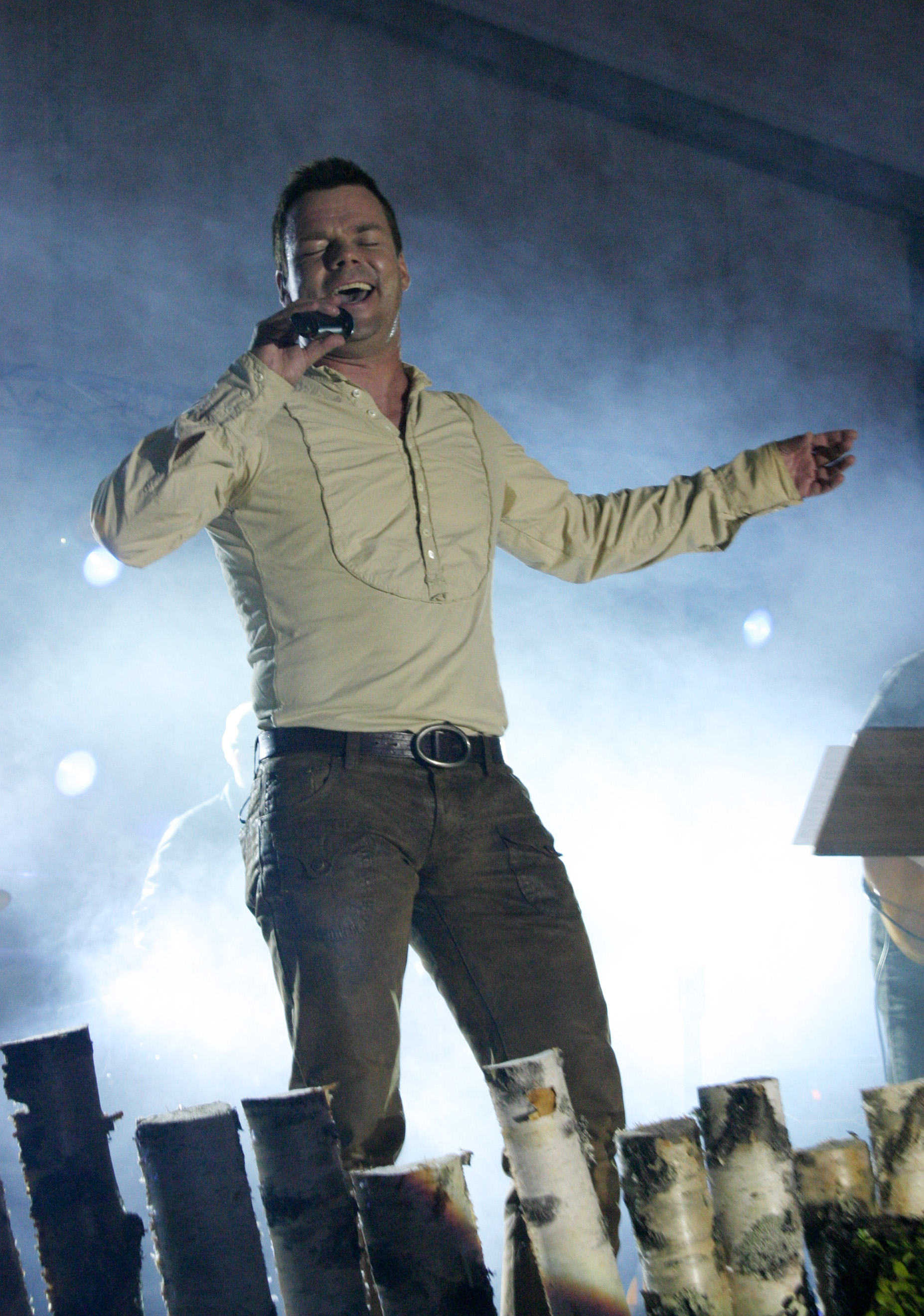
Finland's Jari Sillanpää was the first artist to perform in a Eurovision Song Contest semi-final.

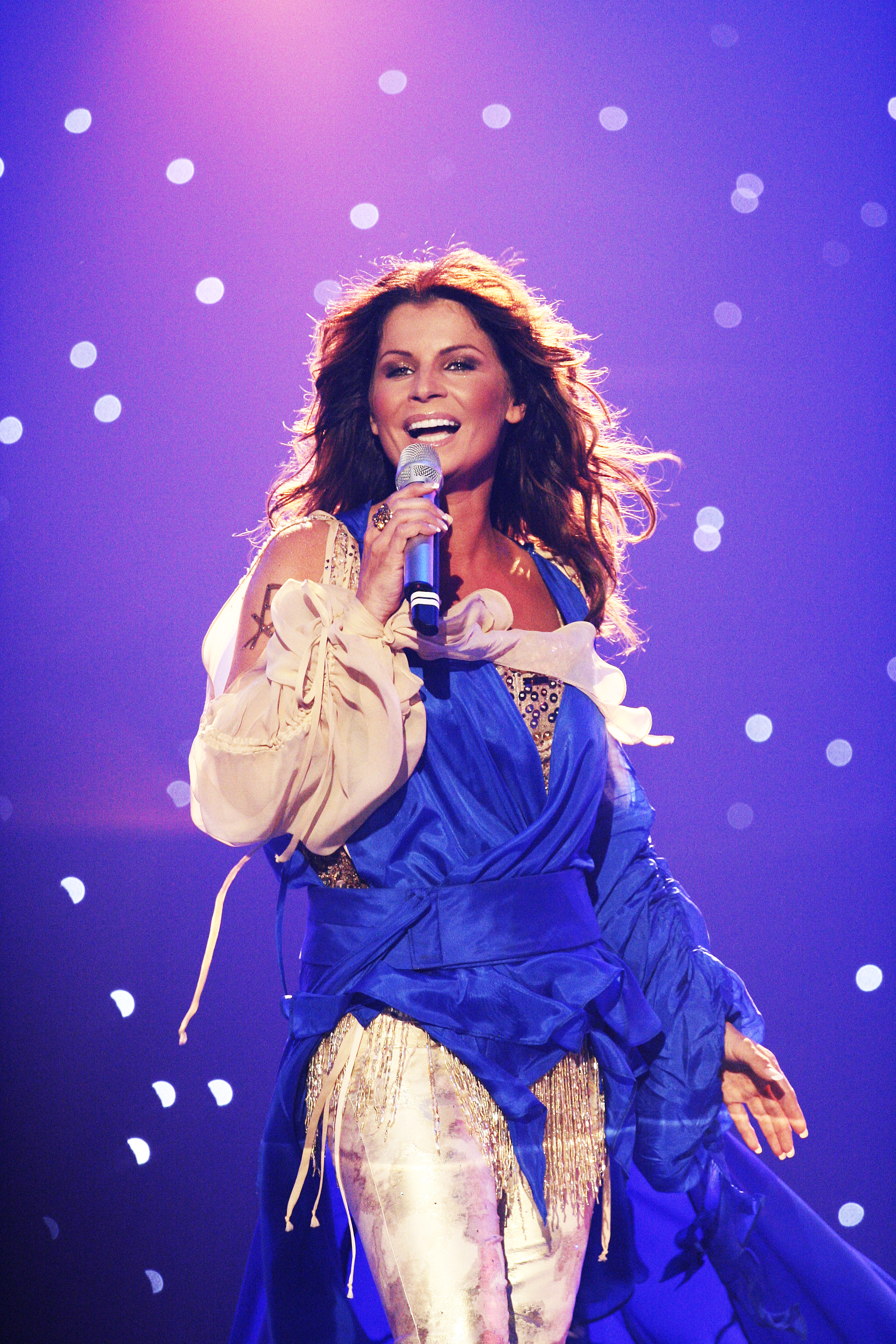
Carola Häggkvist made three contest appearances for Sweden over three decades.

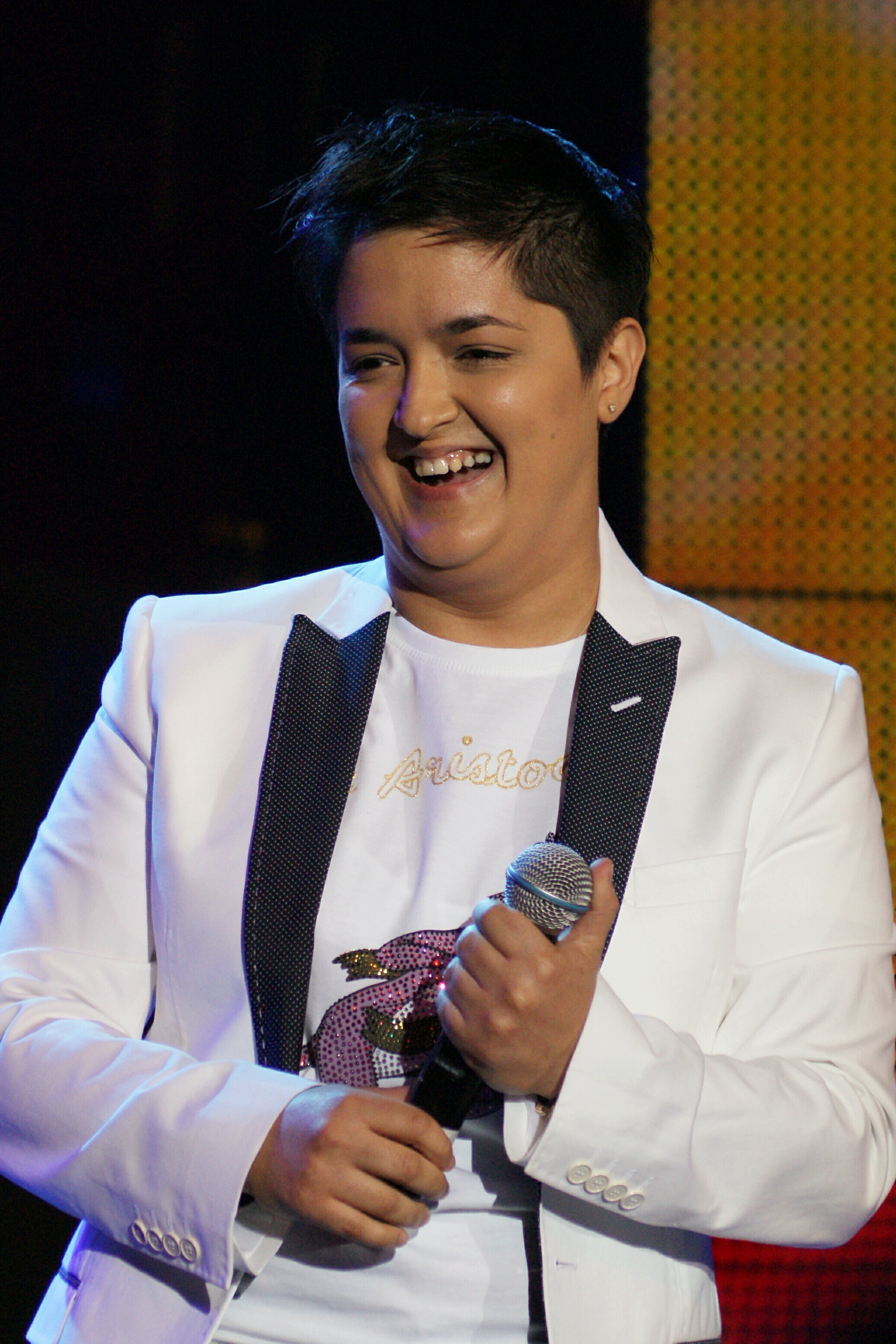
Marija Šerifović became the first Eurovision winning act for Serbia in 2007 on their debut entry.

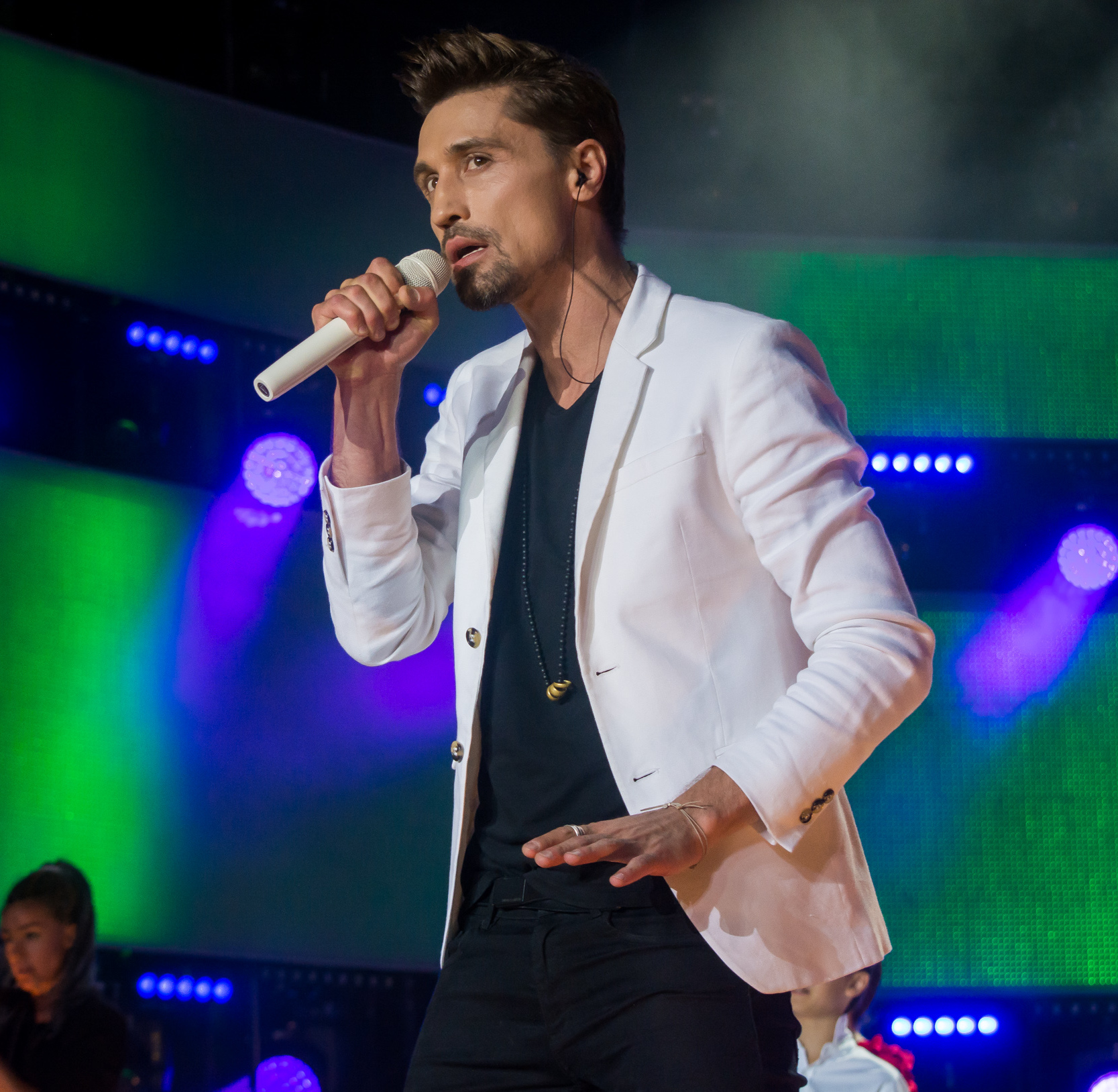
Russia's Dima Bilan came second in 2006 and won the contest in 2008.

Eurovision Song Contest 2004
#	R/O SF	R/O F	Country	#	Artist	Song	Language	Songwriter(s)	Placing
918	1	—N/a	Finland	38	Jari Sillanpää	"Takes 2 to Tango"	English	Jari Sillanpää; Mika Toivanen	DNQ (14)
919	2	—N/a	Belarus	1	Aleksandra and Konstantin	"My Galileo"	English	Konstantin Drapezo; Aleksandra Kirsanova; Aleksey Solomaha	DNQ (19)
920	3	—N/a	Switzerland	45	Piero and the MusicStars	"Celebrate"	English	Greg Manning	DNQ (22 ◁)
921	4	—N/a	Latvia	5	Fomins and Kleins	"Dziesma par laimi"	Latvian	Tomass Kleins; Guntars Račs	DNQ (17)
922	5	—N/a	Israel	27	David D'Or	"Leha'amin" (להאמין)	Hebrew, English	David D'Or; Ehud Manor; Ofer Meiri	DNQ (11)
923	6	—N/a	Andorra	1	Marta Roure	"Jugarem a estimar-nos"	Catalan	Jofre Bardagí	DNQ (18)
924	7	—N/a	Portugal	38	Sofia Vitória	"Foi magia"	Portuguese	Paulo Neves	DNQ (15)
925	8	6	Malta	17	Julie and Ludwig	"On Again... Off Again"	English	Gerard James Borg; Philip Vella	12 (8 †)
926	9	—N/a	Monaco	22	Maryon	"Notre planète"	French	Philippe Bosco; Patrick Sassier	DNQ (19)
927	10	16	Greece	25	Sakis Rouvas	"Shake It"	English	Nikos Terzis; Nektarios Tyrakis	3 (3 †)
928	11	10	Ukraine	2	Ruslana	"Wild Dances"	English, Ukrainian	Oleksandr Ksenofontov; Ruslana Lyzhychko	1 (2 †)
929	12	—N/a	Lithuania	5	Linas and Simona	"What's Happened to Your Love"	English	Linas Adomaitis; Michalis Antoniou; Camden-MS	DNQ (16)
930	13	9	Albania	1	Anjeza Shahini	"The Image of You"	English	Agim Doçi; Edmond Zhulali	7 (4 †)
931	14	21	Cyprus	22	Lisa Andreas	"Stronger Every Minute"	English	Mike Connaris	5 (5 †)
932	15	15	Macedonia	4	Toše Proeski	"Life"	English	Irena Dukić; Jovan Jovanov; Damjan Lazarov	14 (10 †)
933	16	—N/a	Slovenia	10	Platin	"Stay Forever"	English	Simon Gomilšek; Diana Lečnik	DNQ (21)
934	17	—N/a	Estonia	10	Neiokõsõ	"Tii"	Võro	Aapo Ilves; Priit Pajusaar; Glen Pilvre	DNQ (11)
935	18	11	Croatia	12	Ivan Mikulić	"You Are the Only One"	English	Duško Gruborović; Marina Madrinić; Ivan Mikulić	12 (9 †)
936	19	—N/a	Denmark	33	Tomas Thordarson	"Shame on You"	English	Ivar Lind Greiner; Iben Plesner	DNQ (13)
937	20	5	Serbia and Montenegro	1	Željko Joksimović and Ad-Hoc Orchestra	"Lane moje" (Лане моје)	Serbian	Željko Joksimović; Leontina Vukomanović	2 (1 †)
938	21	12	Bosnia and Herzegovina	10	Deen	"In the Disco"	English	Vesna Pisarović	9 (7 †)
939	22	7	Netherlands	45	Re-union	"Without You"	English	Angeline van Otterdijk; Ed van Otterdijk	20 (6 †)
940	—N/a	1	Spain	44	Ramón	"Para llenarme de ti"	Spanish	Kike Santander	10
941	—N/a	2	Austria	41	Tie Break	"Du bist"	German	Peter Zimmermann	21
942	—N/a	3	Norway	43	Knut Anders Sørum	"High"	English	Lars Andersson; Dan Attlerud; Thomas Thörnholm	24 ◁
943	—N/a	4	France	47	Jonatan Cerrada	"À chaque pas"	French, Spanish	Steve Balsamo; Jonatan Cerrada; Ben "Jammin" Robbins	15
944	—N/a	8	Germany	48	Max	"Can't Wait Until Tonight"	English, Turkish	Stefan Raab	8
945	—N/a	13	Belgium	46	Xandee	"1 Life"	English	Dirk Paelinck; Marc Paelinck	22
946	—N/a	14	Russia	8	Julia Savicheva	"Believe Me"	English	Maxim Fadeev; Brenda Loring	11
947	—N/a	17	Iceland	17	Jónsi	"Heaven"	English	Magnús Þór Sigmundsson; Sveinn Rúnar Sigurðsson	19
948	—N/a	18	Ireland	38	Chris Doran	"If My World Stopped Turning"	English	Brian McFadden; Jonathan Shorten	22
949	—N/a	19	Poland	9	Blue Café	"Love Song"	English, Spanish	Tatiana Okupnik; Paweł Rurak-Sokal	17
950	—N/a	20	United Kingdom	47	James Fox	"Hold On to Our Love"	English	Gary Miller; Tim Woodcock	16
951	—N/a	22	Turkey	26	Athena	"For Real"	English	Gökhan Özoğuz; Hakan Özoğuz	4
952	—N/a	23	Romania	6	Sanda	"I Admit"	English	Irina Gligor; George Popa	18
953	—N/a	24	Sweden	44	Lena Philipsson	"It Hurts"	English	Thomas "Orup" Eriksson	5

Eurovision Song Contest 2005
#	R/O SF	R/O F	Country	#	Artist	Song	Language	Songwriter(s)	Placing
954	1	—N/a	Austria	42	Global.Kryner	"Y así"	English, Spanish	Edi Köhldorfer; Christof Spörk	DNQ (21)
955	2	—N/a	Lithuania	6	Laura and the Lovers	"Little by Little"	English	William "Billy" Butt; Bobby Ljunggren	DNQ (25 ◁)
956	3	—N/a	Portugal	39	2B	"Amar"	Portuguese, English	Alexandre Honrado; Ernesto Leite; José da Ponte	DNQ (17)
957	4	7	Moldova	1	Zdob și Zdub	"Boonika bate doba"	English, Romanian	Mihai Gîncu; Roman Iagupov	6 (2 †)
958	5	23	Latvia	6	Walters and Kazha	"The War Is Not Over"	English	Mārtiņš Freimanis	5 (10 †)
959	6	—N/a	Monaco	23	Lise Darly	"Tout de moi"	French	Philippe Bosco; Didier Fabre	DNQ (24)
960	7	11	Israel	28	Shiri Maimon	"HaSheket SheNish'ar" (השקט שנשאר)	Hebrew, English	Pini Aharonbayev; Ben Green; Eyal Shahar	4 (7 †)
961	8	—N/a	Belarus	2	Angelica Agurbash	"Love Me Tonight"	English	Nikos Terzis; Nektarios Tyrakis	DNQ (13)
962	9	—N/a	Netherlands	46	Glennis Grace	"My Impossible Dream"	English	Robert D. Fisher; Bruce Smith	DNQ (14)
963	10	—N/a	Iceland	18	Selma	"If I Had Your Love"	English	Linda Thompson; Þorvaldur Bjarni Þorvaldsson; Vignir Snær Vigfússon	DNQ (16)
964	11	—N/a	Belgium	47	Nuno Resende	"Le Grand Soir"	French	Alec Mansion; Frédéric Zeitoun	DNQ (22)
965	12	—N/a	Estonia	11	Suntribe	"Let's Get Loud"	English	Sven Lõhmus	DNQ (20)
966	13	5	Norway	44	Wig Wam	"In My Dreams"	English	Trond "Teeny" Holter	9 (6 †)
967	14	4	Romania	7	Luminița Anghel and Sistem	"Let Me Try"	English	Cristian Faur	3 (1 †)
968	15	1	Hungary	5	Nox	"Forogj, világ"	Hungarian	Szabolcs Harmath; Attila Valla	12 (5 †)
969	16	—N/a	Finland	39	Geir Rönning	"Why"	English	Steven Stewart; Mika Toivanen	DNQ (18)
970	17	15	Macedonia	5	Martin Vučić	"Make My Day"	English	Branka Kostić; Dragan Vučić	17 (9 †)
971	18	—N/a	Andorra	2	Marian van de Wal	"La mirada interior"	Catalan	Daniel Aragay; Rafael Artesero; Rafael Fernández; Rafah Tanit	DNQ (23)
972	19	22	Switzerland	46	Vanilla Ninja	"Cool Vibes"	English	David Brandes; John O'Flynn; Jane Tempest	8 (8 †)
973	20	18	Croatia	13	Boris Novković feat. Lado Members	"Vukovi umiru sami"	Croatian	Boris Novković; Franjo Valentić	11 (4 †)
974	21	—N/a	Bulgaria	1	Kaffe	"Lorraine"	English	Orlin Pavlov; Vesselin Vesselinov-Eko	DNQ (19)
975	22	—N/a	Ireland	39	Donna and Joe	"Love?"	English	Karl Broderick	DNQ (14)
976	23	—N/a	Slovenia	11	Omar Naber	"Stop"	Slovene	Omar Naber; Urša Vlašič	DNQ (12)
977	24	13	Denmark	34	Jakob Sveistrup	"Talking to You"	English	Jacob Launbjerg; Andreas Mørck	9 (3 †)
978	25	—N/a	Poland	10	Ivan and Delfin	"Czarna dziewczyna"	Polish, Russian	Ivan Komarenko; Łukasz Lazer; Michał Szymański	DNQ (11)
979	—N/a	2	United Kingdom	48	Javine	"Touch My Fire"	English	Javine Hylton; John Themis	22
980	—N/a	3	Malta	18	Chiara	"Angel"	English	Chiara Siracusa	2
981	—N/a	6	Turkey	27	Gülseren	"Rimi Rimi Ley"	Turkish	Göksan Arman; Erdinç Tunç	13
982	—N/a	8	Albania	2	Ledina Çelo	"Tomorrow I Go"	English	Adrian Hila; Pandi Laço	16
983	—N/a	9	Cyprus	23	Constantinos Christoforou	"Ela Ela"	English	Constantinos Christoforou	18
984	—N/a	10	Spain	45	Son de Sol	"Brujería"	Spanish	Alfredo Panebianco	21
985	—N/a	12	Serbia and Montenegro	2	No Name	"Zauvijek moja" (Заувијек моја)	Montenegrin	Slaven Knezović; Milan Perić	7
986	—N/a	14	Sweden	45	Martin Stenmarck	"Las Vegas"	English	Niklas Edberger; Johan Fransson; Tim Larsson; Tobias Lundgren	19
987	—N/a	16	Ukraine	3	GreenJolly	"Razom nas bahato" (Разом нас багато)	Ukrainian, English	GreenJolly	19
988	—N/a	17	Germany	49	Gracia	"Run & Hide"	English	David Brandes; John O'Flynn; Jane Tempest	24 ◁
989	—N/a	19	Greece	26	Helena Paparizou	"My Number One"	English	Christos Dantis; Natalia Germanou; Manos Psaltakis	1
990	—N/a	20	Russia	9	Natalia Podolskaya	"Nobody Hurt No One"	English	Mary Susan Applegate; Viktor Drobysh; Jussi-Pekka Järvinen	15
991	—N/a	21	Bosnia and Herzegovina	11	Feminnem	"Call Me"	English	Andrej Babić	14
992	—N/a	24	France	48	Ortal	"Chacun pense à soi"	French	Ortal; Saad Tabainet	23

Eurovision Song Contest 2006
#	R/O SF	R/O F	Country	#	Artist	Song	Language	Songwriter(s)	Placing
993	1	24	Armenia	1	André	"Without Your Love"	English	Catherine Bekian; Armen Martirosyan	8 (6 †)
994	2	—N/a	Bulgaria	2	Mariana Popova	"Let Me Cry"	English	Elina Gavrilova; Dani Milev	DNQ (17)
995	3	—N/a	Slovenia	12	Anžej Dežan	"Mr Nobody"	English	Matjaž Vlašič; Urša Vlašič	DNQ (16)
996	4	—N/a	Andorra	3	Jenny	"Sense tu"	Catalan	Rafael Artesero; Joan Antoni Rechi	DNQ (23 ◁)
997	5	—N/a	Belarus	3	Polina Smolova	"Mum"	English	Andrey Kostiugov; Sergey Sukhomlin	DNQ (22)
998	6	—N/a	Albania	3	Luiz Ejlli	"Zjarr e ftohtë"	Albanian	Dr. Flori; Klodian Qafoku	DNQ (14)
999	7	—N/a	Belgium	48	Kate Ryan	"Je t'adore"	English	Niklas Bergwall; Lisa Greene; Niclas Kings; Kate Ryan	DNQ (12)
1000	8	21	Ireland	40	Brian Kennedy	"Every Song Is a Cry for Love"	English	Brian Kennedy	10 (9 †)
1001	9	—N/a	Cyprus	24	Annet Artani	"Why Angels Cry"	English	Peter Yiannakis	DNQ (15)
1002	10	—N/a	Monaco	24	Séverine Ferrer	"La Coco-Dance"	French, Tahitian	Iren Bo; J. Woodfeel	DNQ (21)
1003	11	11	Macedonia	6	Elena Risteska	"Ninanajna" (Нинанајна)	English, Macedonian	Darko Dimitrov; Rade Vrčakovski	12 (10 †)
1004	12	—N/a	Poland	11	Ich Troje (Note: Performance contains uncredited live vocals from O-Jay)	"Follow My Heart"	English, Polish, German, Russian	André Franke; William Lennox; O-Jay; Michał Wiśniewski	DNQ (11)
1005	13	10	Russia	10	Dima Bilan	"Never Let You Go"	English	Irina Antonyan; Alexandr Lunyov; Karen Kavaleryan	2 (3 †)
1006	14	23	Turkey	28	Sibel Tüzün	"Süper Star"	Turkish	Sibel Tüzün	11 (8 †)
1007	15	18	Ukraine	4	Tina Karol	"Show Me Your Love"	English	Tina Karol; Mikhail Nekrasov; Pavlo Shylko	7 (7 †)
1008	16	17	Finland	40	Lordi	"Hard Rock Hallelujah"	English	Mr Lordi	1 (1 †)
1009	17	—N/a	Netherlands	47	Treble	"Amambanda"	English, Imaginary	Treble	DNQ (20)
1010	18	14	Lithuania	7	LT United	"We Are the Winners"	English	Viktoras Diawara; Andrius Mamontovas; Saulius Urbonavičius	6 (5 †)
1011	19	—N/a	Portugal	40	Nonstop	"Coisas de nada"	Portuguese, English	José Manuel Afonso; Elvis Veiguinha	DNQ (19)
1012	20	22	Sweden	46	Carola	"Invincible"	English	Thomas G:son; Carola Häggkvist; Bobby Ljunggren; Henrik Wikström	5 (4 †)
1013	21	—N/a	Estonia	12	Sandra	"Through My Window"	English	Jana Hallas; Alar Kotkas; Ilmar Laisaar; Pearu Paulus	DNQ (18)
1014	22	13	Bosnia and Herzegovina	12	Hari Mata Hari	"Lejla"	Bosnian	Dejan Ivanović; Željko Joksimović; Fahrudin Pecikoza	3 (2 †)
1015	23	—N/a	Iceland	19	Silvía Night	"Congratulations"	English	Ágústa Eva Erlendsdóttir; Þorvaldur Bjarni Þorvaldsson	DNQ (13)
1016	—N/a	1	Switzerland	47	six4one	"If We All Give a Little"	English	Bernd Meinunger; Ralph Siegel	16
1017	—N/a	2	Moldova	2	Arsenium feat. Natalia Gordienko and Connect-R	"Loca"	English	Arsenium	20
1018	—N/a	3	Israel	29	Eddie Butler	"Together We Are One"	Hebrew, English	Orly Burg; Eddie Butler; Osnat Tzavag	23
1019	—N/a	4	Latvia	7	Vocal Group Cosmos	"I Hear Your Heart"	English	Molly-Ann Leikin; Guntars Račs; Andris Sējāns; Reinis Sējāns	16
1020	—N/a	5	Norway	45	Christine Guldbrandsen	"Alvedansen"	Norwegian	Kjetil Fluge; Christine Guldbrandsen; Atle Halstensen	14
1021	—N/a	6	Spain	46	Las Ketchup	"Bloody Mary"	Spanish	Manuel Ruiz Gómez "Queco"	21
1022	—N/a	7	Malta	19	Fabrizio Faniello	"I Do"	English	Fabrizio Faniello; Aldo Spiteri	24 ◁
1023	—N/a	8	Germany	50	Texas Lightning	"No No Never"	English	Jane Comerford	14
1024	—N/a	9	Denmark	35	Sidsel Ben Semmane	"Twist of Love"	English	Niels Drevsholt	18
1025	—N/a	12	Romania	8	Mihai Trăistariu	"Tornerò"	English, Italian	Eduard Cîrcotã; Mihaela Deac; Cristian Hriscu	4
1026	—N/a	15	United Kingdom	49	Daz Sampson	"Teenage Life"	English	John Matthews; Daz Sampson	19
1027	—N/a	16	Greece	27	Anna Vissi	"Everything"	English	Nikos Karvelas; Anna Vissi	9
1028	—N/a	19	France	49	Virginie Pouchain	"Il était temps"	French	Corneille	22
1029	—N/a	20	Croatia	14	Severina	"Moja štikla"	Croatian	Boris Novković; Franjo Valentić; Severina Vučković	12

Eurovision Song Contest 2007
#	R/O SF	R/O F	Country	#	Artist	Song	Language	Songwriter(s)	Placing
1030	1	21	Bulgaria	3	Elitsa Todorova and Stoyan Yankoulov	"Water"	Bulgarian	Elitsa Todorova; Stoyan Yankoulov	5 (6 †)
1031	2	—N/a	Israel	30	Teapacks	"Push the Button"	English, French, Hebrew	Kobi Oz	DNQ (24)
1032	3	—N/a	Cyprus	25	Evridiki	"Comme ci, comme ça"	French	Dimitris Korgialas; Poseidonas Yiannopoulos	DNQ (15)
1033	4	3	Belarus	4	Koldun	"Work Your Magic"	English	Karen Kavaleryan; Philipp Kirkorov	6 (4 †)
1034	5	—N/a	Iceland	20	Eiríkur Hauksson	"Valentine Lost"	English	Peter Fenner; Sveinn Rúnar Sigurðsson	DNQ (13)
1035	6	11	Georgia	1	Sopho	"Visionary Dream"	English	Beqa Japaridze; Bibi Kvachadze	12 (8 †)
1036	7	—N/a	Montenegro	1	Stevan Faddy	"'Ajde, kroči" ('Ајде, крочи)	Montenegrin	Slaven Knezović; Milan Perić	DNQ (22)
1037	8	—N/a	Switzerland	48	DJ BoBo	"Vampires Are Alive"	English	René Baumann; Axel Breitung	DNQ (20)
1038	9	24	Moldova	3	Natalia Barbu	"Fight"	English	Alexandru Brașoveanu; Elena Buga	10 (10 †)
1039	10	—N/a	Netherlands	48	Edsilia Rombley	"On Top of the World"	English	Martin Gijzemijter; Maarten ten Hove; Tjeerd Oosterhuis	DNQ (21)
1040	11	—N/a	Albania	4	Frederik Ndoci	"Hear My Plea"	English, Albanian	Adrian Hila; Pandi Laço	DNQ (17)
1041	12	—N/a	Denmark	36	DQ	"Drama Queen"	English	Peter Andersen; Claus Christensen; Simon Munk	DNQ (19)
1042	13	—N/a	Croatia	15	Dragonfly feat. Dado Topić	"Vjerujem u ljubav"	Croatian, English	Dado Topić	DNQ (16)
1043	14	—N/a	Poland	12	The Jet Set	"Time to Party"	English	Mateusz Krezan; David Junior Serame; Kamil Varen	DNQ (14)
1044	15	17	Serbia	1	Marija Šerifović	"Molitva" (Молитва)	Serbian	Vladimir Graić; Saša Milošević Mare	1 (1 †)
1045	16	—N/a	Czech Republic	1	Kabát	"Malá dáma"	Czech	Kabát	DNQ (28 ◁)
1046	17	—N/a	Portugal	41	Sabrina	"Dança comigo"	Portuguese	Emanuel; Tó Maria Vinhas	DNQ (11)
1047	18	6	Macedonia	7	Karolina	"Mojot svet" (Мојот свет)	Macedonian, English	Grigor Koprov; Ognen Nedelkovski	14 (9 †)
1048	19	—N/a	Norway	46	Guri Schanke	"Ven a bailar conmigo"	English	Thomas G:son	DNQ (18)
1049	20	—N/a	Malta	20	Olivia Lewis	"Vertigo"	English	Gerard James Borg; Philip Vella	DNQ (25)
1050	21	—N/a	Andorra	4	Anonymous	"Salvem el món"	Catalan, English	Anonymous	DNQ (12)
1051	22	8	Hungary	6	Magdi Rúzsa	"Unsubstantial Blues"	English	Imre Mózsik; Magdi Rúzsa	9 (2 †)
1052	23	—N/a	Estonia	13	Gerli Padar	"Partners in Crime"	English	Hendrik Sal-Saller; Berit Vaher	DNQ (22)
1053	24	—N/a	Belgium	49	The KMG's	"LovePower"	English	Wakas Ashiq; Paul Curtiz	DNQ (26)
1054	25	7	Slovenia	13	Alenka Gotar	"Cvet z juga"	Slovene	Andrej Babić	15 (7 †)
1055	26	22	Turkey	29	Kenan Doğulu	"Shake It Up Şekerim"	English	Kenan Doğulu	4 (3 †)
1056	27	—N/a	Austria	43	Eric Papilaya	"Get a Life – Get Alive"	English	Austin Howard; Greg Usek	DNQ (27)
1057	28	14	Latvia	8	Bonaparti.lv	"Questa notte"	Italian	Kjell Jennstig; Francesca Russo; Torbjörn Wassenius	16 (5 †)
1058	—N/a	1	Bosnia and Herzegovina	13	Marija Šestić	"Rijeka bez imena" (Ријека без имена)	Serbian	Goran Kovačić; Aleksandra Milutinović	11
1059	—N/a	2	Spain	47	D'Nash	"I Love You Mi Vida"	Spanish	Thomas G:son; Rebeca Pous del Toro; Andreas Rickstrand; Tony Sánchez-Ohlsson	20
1060	—N/a	4	Ireland	41	Dervish	"They Can't Stop the Spring"	English	Tommy Moran; John Waters	24 ◁
1061	—N/a	5	Finland	41	Hanna Pakarinen	"Leave Me Alone"	English	Miikka Huttunen; Hanna Pakarinen; Martti Vuorinen	17
1062	—N/a	9	Lithuania	8	4Fun	"Love or Leave"	English	Julija Ritčik	21
1063	—N/a	10	Greece	28	Sarbel	"Yassou Maria" (Γειά σου Μαρία)	English	Marcus Englöf; Mack; Alex Papaconstantinou	7
1064	—N/a	12	Sweden	47	The Ark	"The Worrying Kind"	English	Ola Salo	18
1065	—N/a	13	France	50	Les Fatals Picards	"L'Amour à la française"	French, English ("Franglais")	Ivan Callot; Yves Giraud; Laurent Honel; Paul Léger; Jean-Marc Sauvagnargues	22
1066	—N/a	15	Russia	11	Serebro	"Song #1"	English	Daniil Babichev; Maxim Fadeev	3
1067	—N/a	16	Germany	51	Roger Cicero	"Frauen regier'n die Welt"	German, English	Matthias Hass; Frank Ramond	19
1068	—N/a	18	Ukraine	5	Verka Serduchka	"Dancing Lasha Tumbai"	German, English, Surzhyk	Andriy Danylko	2
1069	—N/a	19	United Kingdom	50	Scooch	"Flying the Flag (For You)"	English	Andrew Hill; Morten Schjolin; Russ Spencer; Paul Tarry	22
1070	—N/a	20	Romania	9	Todomondo	"Liubi, Liubi, I Love You" (Люби, Люби, I Love You)	English, Italian, Spanish, Russian, French, Romanian	Mister M; Todomondo	13
1071	—N/a	23	Armenia	2	Hayko	"Anytime You Need"	English, Armenian	Hayko; Karen Kavaleryan	8

Eurovision Song Contest 2008
#	R/O SF	R/O F	Country	#	Artist	Song	Language	Songwriter(s)	Placing
1072	1 *	—N/a	Montenegro	2	Stefan Filipović	"Zauvijek volim te" (Заувијек волим те)	Montenegrin	Grigor Koprov; Ognen Nedelkovski	DNQ (14)
1073	2 *	7	Israel	31	Boaz	"The Fire in Your Eyes"	Hebrew, English	Dana International; Shai Kerem	9 (5 †)
1074	3 *	—N/a	Estonia	14	Kreisiraadio	"Leto svet"	Serbian, German, Finnish	Tarmo Leinatamm; Peeter Oja; Priit Pajusaar; Glen Pilvre; Hannes Võrno	DNQ (18)
1075	4 *	—N/a	Moldova	4	Geta Burlacu	"A Century of Love"	English	Oleg Baraliuc; Viorica Demici	DNQ (12)
1076	5 *	—N/a	San Marino	1	Miodio	"Complice"	Italian	Nicola Della Valle; Francesco Sancisi	DNQ (19 ◁)
1077	6 *	—N/a	Belgium	50	Ishtar	"O Julissi"	Imaginary	Michel Vangheluwe	DNQ (17)
1078	7 *	20	Azerbaijan	1	Elnur and Samir	"Day After Day"	English	Zahra Badalbeyli; Govhar Hasanzadeh	8 (6 †)
1079	8 *	—N/a	Slovenia	14	Rebeka Dremelj	"Vrag naj vzame"	Slovene	Josip Miani-Pipi; Igor "Amon" Mazul	DNQ (11)
1080	9 *	25	Norway	47	Maria	"Hold On Be Strong"	English	Mira Craig	5 (4 †)
1081	10 *	10	Poland	13	Isis Gee	"For Life"	English	Isis Gee	24 (10 ‡)
1082	11 *	—N/a	Ireland	42	Dustin the Turkey	"Irelande Douze Pointe"	English	Dustin the Turkey; Simon Fine; Darren Smith	DNQ (15)
1083	12 *	—N/a	Andorra	5	Gisela	"Casanova"	English, Catalan	Jordi Cubino	DNQ (16)
1084	13 *	6	Bosnia and Herzegovina	14	Laka	"Pokušaj"	Bosnian	Elvir Laković "Laka"	10 (9 †)
1085	14 *	5	Armenia	3	Sirusho	"Qélé, Qélé" (Քելե Քելե)	English, Armenian	H.A. Der-Hovagimian; Sirusho	4 (2 †)
1086	15 *	—N/a	Netherlands	49	Hind	"Your Heart Belongs to Me"	English	Bas van den Heuvel; Hind Laroussi Tahiri; Tjeerd van Zanen	DNQ (13)
1087	16 *	8	Finland	42	Teräsbetoni	"Missä miehet ratsastaa"	Finnish	J. Ahola	22 (8 †)
1088	17 *	1	Romania	10	Nico and Vlad	"Pe-o margine de lume"	Romanian, Italian	Andreea Andrei; Adina Șuteu; Andrei Tudor	20 (7 †)
1089	18 *	24	Russia	12	Dima Bilan	"Believe"	English	Jim Beanz; Dima Bilan	1 (3 †)
1090	19 *	21	Greece	29	Kalomira	"Secret Combination"	English	Konstantinos Pantzis; Poseidonas Yiannopoulos	3 (1 †)
1091	1 **	11	Iceland	21	Euroband	"This Is My Life"	English	Örlygur Smári; Paul Oscar; Peter Fenner	14 (8 †)
1092	2 **	15	Sweden	48	Charlotte Perrelli	"Hero"	English	Fredrik Kempe; Bobby Ljunggren	18 (12 ‡)
1093	3 **	12	Turkey	30	Mor ve Ötesi	"Deli"	Turkish	Mor ve Ötesi	7 (7 †)
1094	4 **	18	Ukraine	6	Ani Lorak	"Shady Lady"	English	Karen Kavaleryan; Philipp Kirkorov	2 (1 †)
1095	5 **	—N/a	Lithuania	9	Jeronimas Milius	"Nomads in the Night"	English	Vytautas Diškevičius; Jeronimas Milius	DNQ (16)
1096	6 **	3	Albania	5	Olta Boka	"Zemrën e lamë peng"	Albanian	Adrian Hila; Pandi Laço	17 (9 †)
1097	7 **	—N/a	Switzerland	49	Paolo Meneguzzi	"Era stupendo"	Italian	Vincenzo Incenzo; Pablo Meneguzzo	DNQ (13)
1098	8 **	—N/a	Czech Republic	2	Tereza Kerndlová	"Have Some Fun"	English	Gordon Pogoda; Stano Šimor	DNQ (18)
1099	9 **	—N/a	Belarus	5	Ruslan Alehno	"Hasta la vista"	English	Taras Demchuk; Eleonora Melnik	DNQ (17)
1100	10 **	14	Latvia	9	Pirates of the Sea	"Wolves of the Sea"	English	Claes Andreasson; Jonas Liberg; Johan Sahlén; Torbjörn Wassenius	12 (6 †)
1101	11 **	9	Croatia	16	Kraljevi ulice and 75 Cents	"Romanca"	Croatian	Miran "Hadži" Veljković	21 (4 †)
1102	12 **	—N/a	Bulgaria	4	Deep Zone and Balthazar	"DJ, Take Me Away"	English	Dian Savov	DNQ (11)
1103	13 **	16	Denmark	37	Simon Mathew	"All Night Long"	English	Nis Bøgvad; Svend Gudiksen; Jacob Launbjerg	15 (3 †)
1104	14 **	17	Georgia	2	Diana Gurtskaya	"Peace Will Come"	English	Kim Breitburg; Karen Kavaleryan	11 (5 †)
1105	15 **	—N/a	Hungary	7	Csézy	"Candlelight"	English, Hungarian	Jánosi; Imre Mózsik; Viktor Rakonczai	DNQ (19 ◁)
1106	16 **	—N/a	Malta	21	Morena	"Vodka"	English	Gerard James Borg; Philip Vella	DNQ (14)
1107	17 **	—N/a	Cyprus	26	Evdokia Kadi	"Femme Fatale"	Greek	Nicos Evangelou; Vangelis Evangelou	DNQ (15)
1108	18 **	—N/a	Macedonia	8	Tamara, Vrčak and Adrijan	"Let Me Love You"	English	Rade Vrčakovski "Vrčak"	DNQ (10)
1109	19 **	13	Portugal	42	Vânia Fernandes	"Senhora do mar (negras águas)"	Portuguese	Andrej Babić; Carlos Coelho	13 (2 †)
1110	—N/a	2	United Kingdom	51	Andy Abraham	"Even If"	English	Andy Abraham; Andy Watkins; Paul Wilson	25 ◁
1111	—N/a	4	Germany	52	No Angels	"Disappear"	English	Remee; Hanne Sørvaag; Thomas Troelsen	23
1112	—N/a	19	France	51	Sébastien Tellier	"Divine"	English	Amandine de la Richardière; Sébastien Tellier	19
1113	—N/a	22	Spain	48	Rodolfo Chikilicuatre	"Baila el Chiki Chiki"	Spanish, English	Rodolfo Chikilicuatre and friends	16
1114	—N/a	23	Serbia	2	Jelena Tomašević feat. Bora Dugić	"Oro" (Оро)	Serbian	Dejan Ivanović; Željko Joksimović	6

Eurovision Song Contest 2009
#	R/O SF	R/O F	Country	#	Artist	Song	Language	Songwriter(s)	Placing
1115	1 *	—N/a	Montenegro	3	Andrea Demirović	"Just Get Out of My Life"	English	Bernd Meinunger; José Juan Santana Rodriguez; Ralph Siegel	DNQ (11)
1116	2 *	—N/a	Czech Republic	3	Gipsy.cz	"Aven Romale"	English, Romani	Radoslav "Gipsy" Banga	DNQ (18 ◁)
1117	3 *	—N/a	Belgium	51	Copycat	"Copycat"	English	Jacques Duvall; Benjamin Schoos	DNQ (17)
1118	4 *	—N/a	Belarus	6	Petr Elfimov	"Eyes That Never Lie"	English	Petr Elfimov; Valery Prokhozhy	DNQ (13)
1119	5 *	4	Sweden	49	Malena Ernman	"La Voix"	French, English	Malena Ernman; Fredrik Kempe	21 (4 †)
1120	6 *	9	Armenia	4	Inga and Anush	"Jan Jan" (Ջան Ջան)	English, Armenian	Avet Barseghyan; Mane Hakobyan; Vardan Zadoyan	10 (5 †)
1121	7 *	—N/a	Andorra	6	Susanne Georgi	"La teva decisió (Get a Life)"	Catalan, English	Rune Braager; Lene Dissing; Pernille Georgi; Susanne Georgi; Josep Roca Vila; Marcus Winther-John	DNQ (15)
1122	8 *	—N/a	Switzerland	50	Lovebugs	"The Highest Heights"	English	Lovebugs; Florian Senn; Adrian Sieber; Thomas Rechberger	DNQ (14)
1123	9 *	18	Turkey	31	Hadise	"Düm Tek Tek"	English	Hadise Açıkgöz; Sinan Akçıl; Stefaan Fernande	4 (2 †)
1124	10 *	2	Israel	32	Noa and Mira Awad	"There Must Be Another Way"	English, Hebrew, Arabic	Mira Awad; Gil Dor; Noa	16 (7 †)
1125	11 *	—N/a	Bulgaria	5	Krassimir Avramov	"Illusion"	English	Krassimir Avramov; Casie Tabanau; William Tabanau	DNQ (16)
1126	12 *	7	Iceland	22	Yohanna	"Is It True?"	English	Tinatin Japaridze; Christopher Neil; Óskar Páll Sveinsson	2 (1 †)
1127	13 *	—N/a	Macedonia	9	Next Time	"Nešto što kje ostane" (Нешто што ќе остане)	Macedonian	Jovan Jovanov; Damjan Lazarov; Elvir Mekić	DNQ (10)
1128	14 *	22	Romania	11	Elena	"The Balkan Girls"	English	Ovidiu Bistriceanu; Laurențiu Duță; Daris Mangal; Alexandru Pelin	19 (9 †)
1129	15 *	24	Finland	43	Waldo's People	"Lose Control"	English	Karima; Annie Kratz-Gutå; Ari Lehtonen; Waldo	25 ◁ (12 ‡)
1130	16 *	6	Portugal	43	Flor-de-Lis	"Todas as ruas do amor"	Portuguese	Pedro Marques; Paulo Pereira	15 (8 †)
1131	17 *	14	Malta	22	Chiara	"What If We"	English	Gregory Bilsen; Marc Paelinck	22 (6 †)
1132	18 *	12	Bosnia and Herzegovina	15	Regina	"Bistra voda"	Bosnian	Aleksandar Čović	9 (3 †)
1133	1 **	5	Croatia	17	Igor Cukrov feat. Andrea	"Lijepa Tena"	Croatian	Tonči Huljić; Vjekoslava Huljić	18 (13 ‡)
1134	2 **	—N/a	Ireland	43	Sinéad Mulvey and Black Daisy	"Et Cetera"	English	Jonas Gladnikoff; Niall Mooney; Daniele Moretti; Christina Schilling	DNQ (11)
1135	3 **	—N/a	Latvia	10	Intars Busulis	"Probka" (Пробка)	Russian	Jānis Elsbergs; Kārlis Lācis; Sergejs Timofejevs	DNQ (19 ◁)
1136	4 **	—N/a	Serbia	3	Marko Kon and Milaan	"Cipela" (Ципела)	Serbian	Aleksandar Kobac; Marko Kon; Milan Nikolić	DNQ (10)
1137	5 **	—N/a	Poland	14	Lidia Kopania	"I Don't Wanna Leave"	English	Dee Adam; Rike Boomgaarden; Alex Geringas; Bernd Klimpel	DNQ (12)
1138	6 **	20	Norway	48	Alexander Rybak	"Fairytale"	English	Alexander Rybak	1 (1 †)
1139	7 **	—N/a	Cyprus	27	Christina Metaxa	"Firefly"	English	Nikolas Metaxas	DNQ (14)
1140	8 **	—N/a	Slovakia	4	Kamil Mikulčík and Nela Pocisková	"Leť tmou"	Slovak	Rastislav Dubovský; Petronela Kolevská; Anna Žigová	DNQ (18)
1141	9 **	16	Denmark	38	Brinck	"Believe Again"	English	Lars Halvor Jensen; Ronan Keating; Martin Michael Larsson	13 (8 †)
1142	10 **	—N/a	Slovenia	15	Quartissimo feat. Martina	"Love Symphony"	English, Slovene	Andrej Babić; Saša Lendero	DNQ (16)
1143	11 **	—N/a	Hungary	8	Zoli Ádok	"Dance with Me"	English	Kasai; Zé Szabó	DNQ (15)
1144	12 **	11	Azerbaijan	2	Aysel and Arash	"Always"	English	Johan Bejerholm; Marcus Englöf; Arash Labaf; Alex Papaconstantinou; Robert Uhlmann; Anderz Wrethov; Elin Wrethov	3 (2 †)
1145	13 **	8	Greece	30	Sakis Rouvas	"This Is Our Night"	English	Cameron Giles-Webb; Dimitris Kontopoulos; Craig Porteils	7 (4 †)
1146	14 **	1	Lithuania	10	Sasha Son	"Love"	English, Russian	Dmitrij Šavrov	23 (9 †)
1147	15 **	13	Moldova	5	Nelly Ciobanu	"Hora din Moldova"	Romanian, English	Nelly Ciobanu; Veaceslav Daniliuc; Andrei Hadjiu	14 (5 †)
1148	16 **	19	Albania	6	Kejsi Tola	"Carry Me in Your Dreams"	English	Agim Doçi; Edmond Zhulali	17 (7 †)
1149	17 **	21	Ukraine	7	Svetlana Loboda	"Be My Valentine! (Anti-Crisis Girl)"	English	Svetlana Loboda; Yevgeny Matyushenko	12 (6 †)
1150	18 **	15	Estonia	15	Urban Symphony	"Rändajad"	Estonian	Sven Lõhmus	6 (3 †)
1151	19 **	—N/a	Netherlands	50	The Toppers	"Shine"	English	Gordon Heuckeroth	DNQ (17)
1152	—N/a	3	France	52	Patricia Kaas	"Et s'il fallait le faire"	French	Fred Blondin; Anse Lazio	8
1153	—N/a	10	Russia	13	Anastasia Prikhodko	"Mamo" (Мамо)	Russian, Ukrainian	Diana Golde; Konstantin Meladze	11
1154	—N/a	17	Germany	53	Alex Swings Oscar Sings!	"Miss Kiss Kiss Bang"	English	Alex Christensen; Steffen Häfelinger	20
1155	—N/a	23	United Kingdom	52	Jade Ewen	"It's My Time"	English	Andrew Lloyd Webber; Diane Warren	5
1156	—N/a	25	Spain	49	Soraya Arnelas	"La noche es para mí"	Spanish	Jason Gill; Irini Michas; Felipe Pedroso; Dimitri Stassos	24

=== 2010s ===
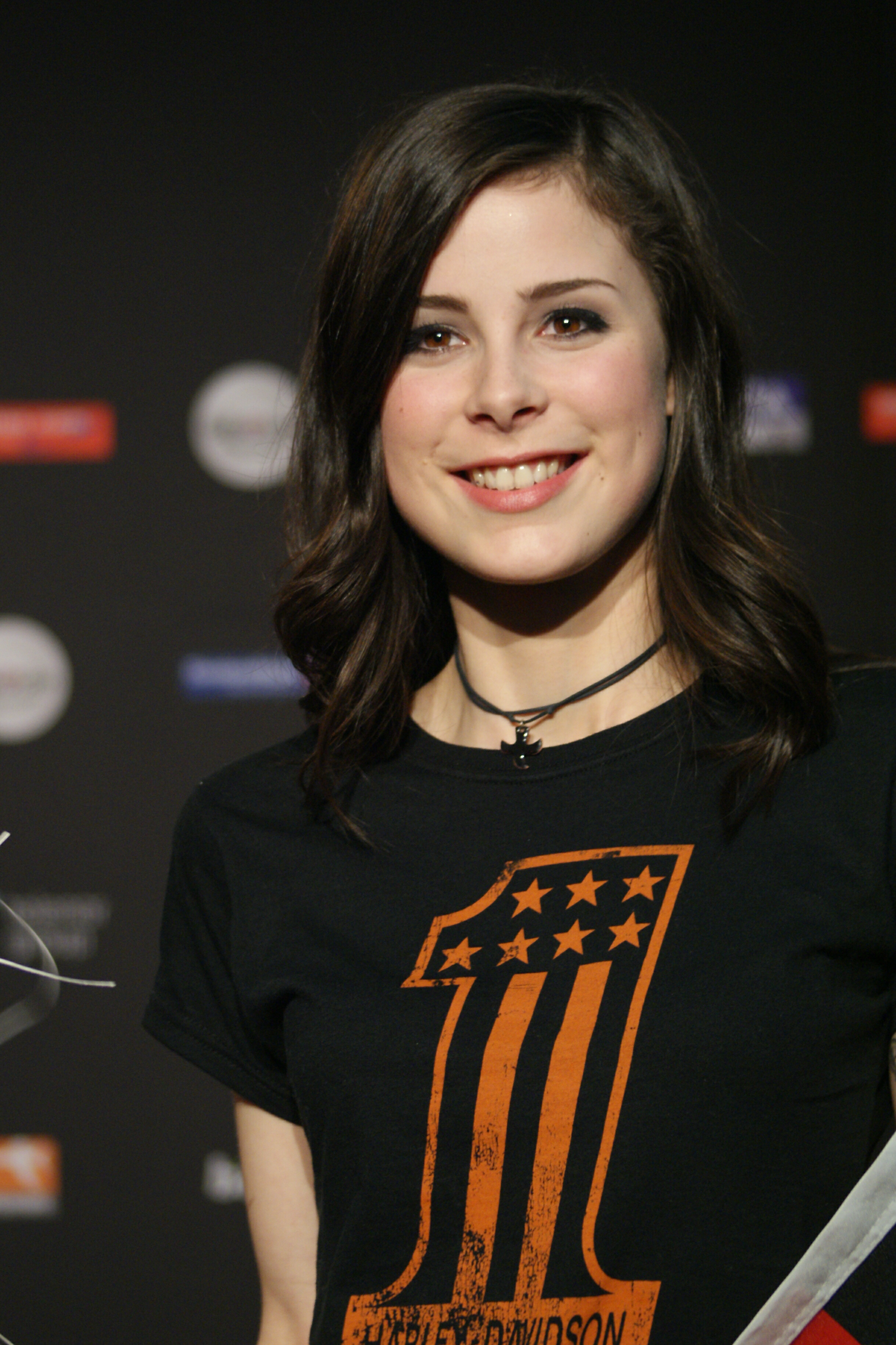
Lena brought Germany its second win in 2010, and was the first "Big Four" entrant to win since the group's establishment in 1999.

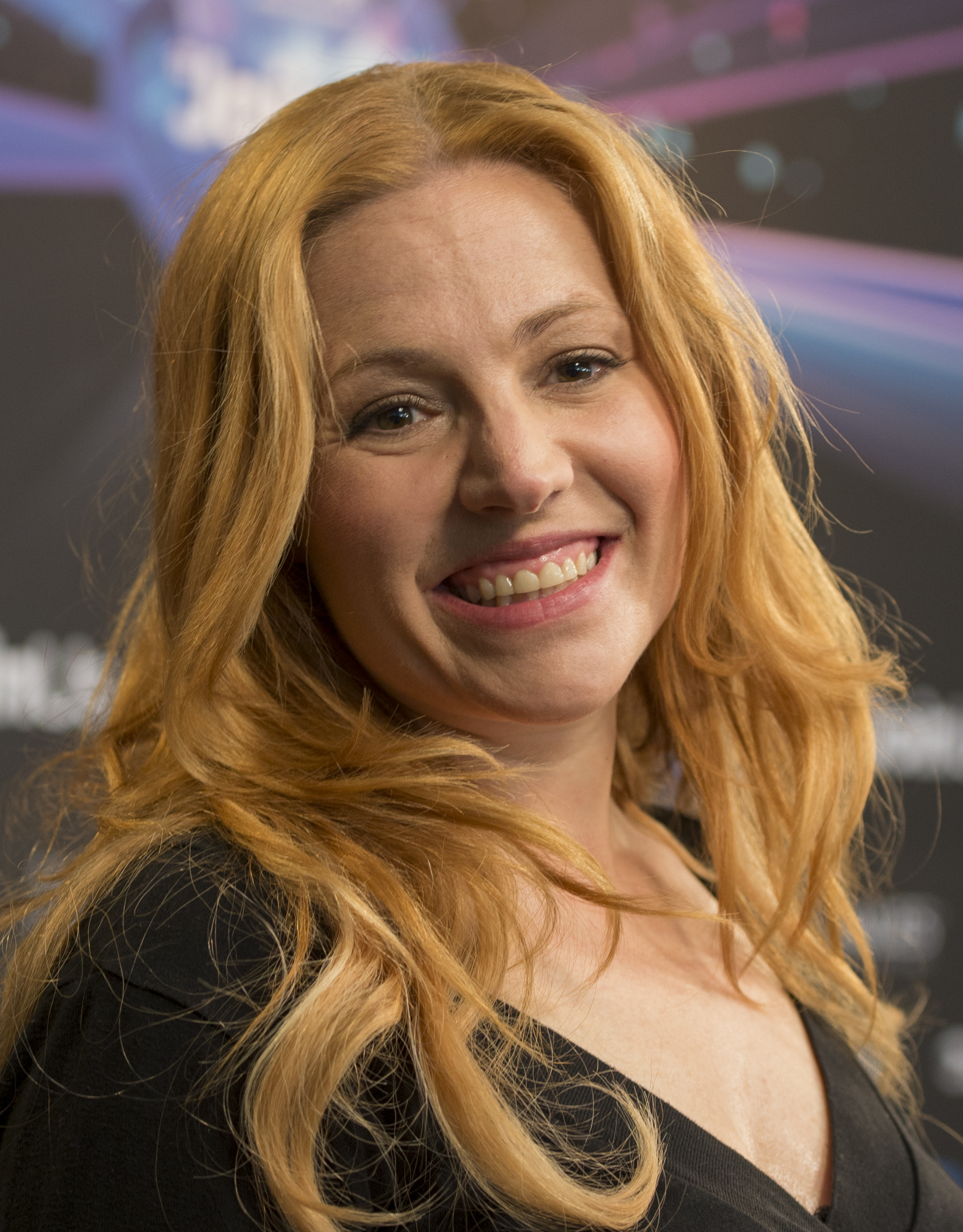
Valentina Monetta has made four contest appearances for San Marino, and brought the country to the final for the first time in 2014.

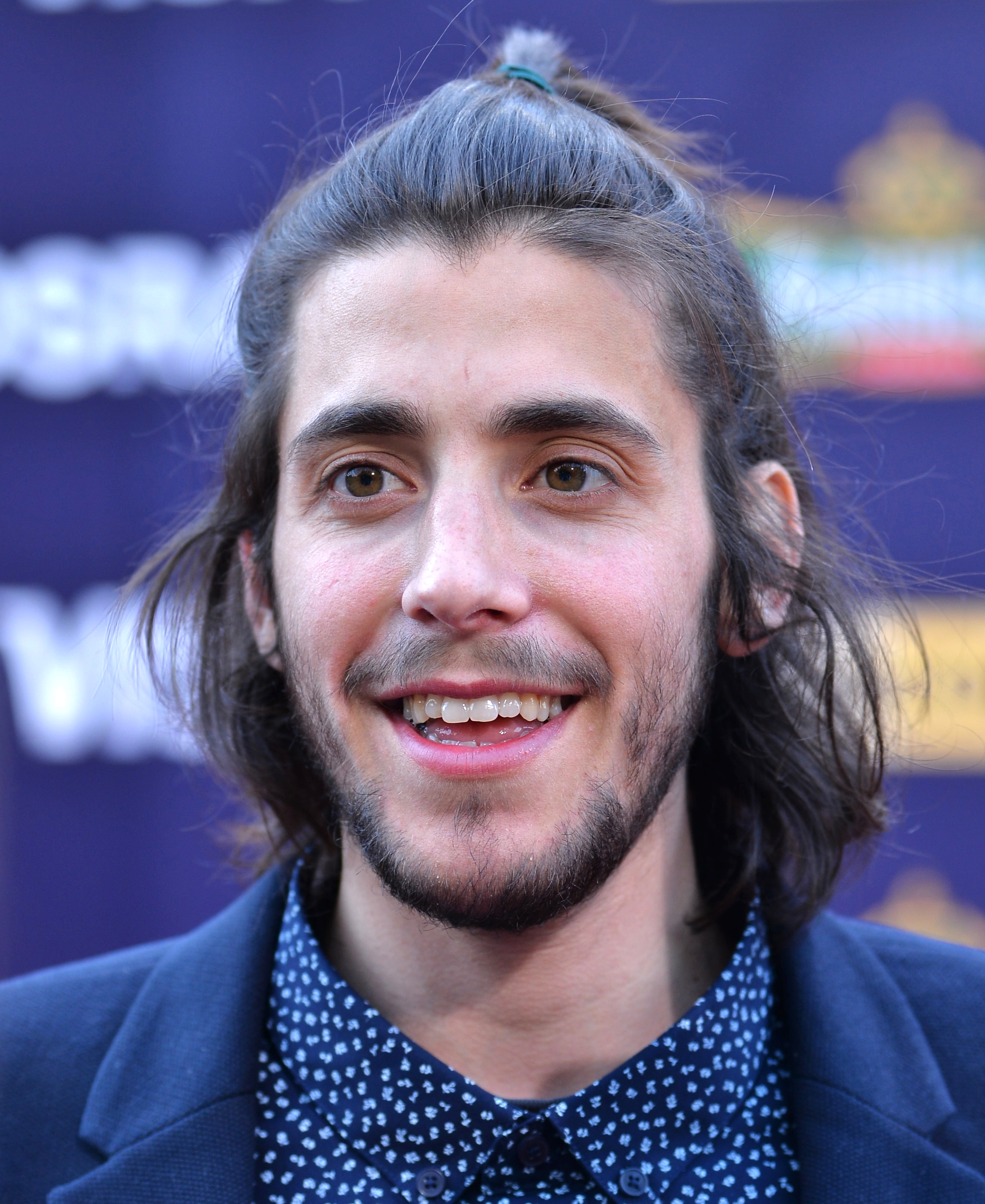
Salvador Sobral became the contest's first Portuguese winner in 2017, 53 years after the country's debut.

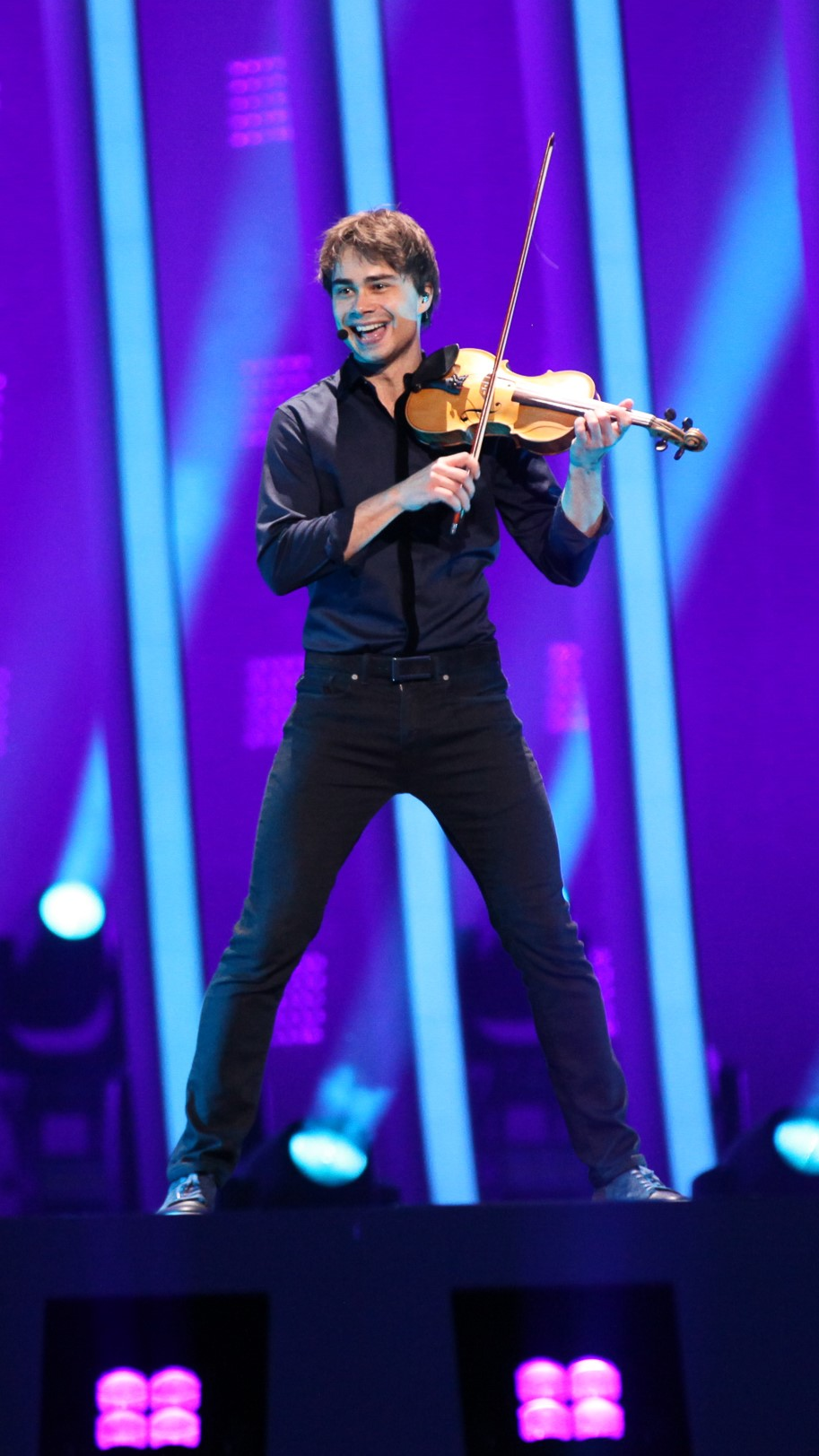
Alexander Rybak, winner of the 2009 contest for Norway, performed the contest's 1,500th entry in 2018.

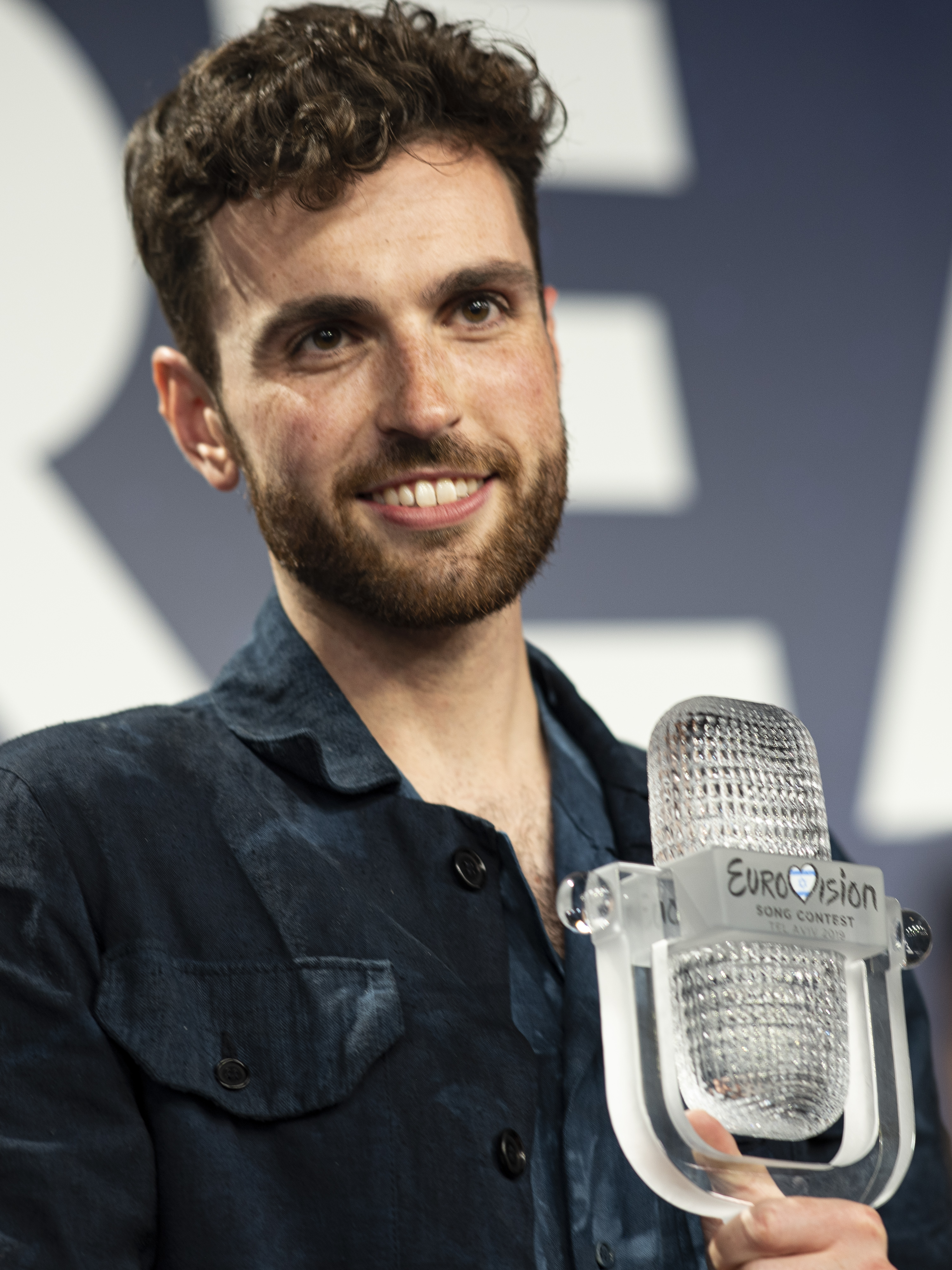
In 2019, Duncan Laurence gave the Netherlands its first Eurovision victory in 44 years.

Eurovision Song Contest 2010
#	R/O SF	R/O F	Country	#	Artist	Song	Language	Songwriter(s)	Placing
1157	1 *	4	Moldova	6	SunStroke Project and Olia Tira	"Run Away"	English	Alina Galetskaya; Anton Ragoza; Sergey Stepanov	22 (10 †)
1158	2 *	20	Russia	14	Peter Nalitch and Friends	"Lost and Forgotten"	English	Peter Nalitch	11 (7 †)
1159	3 *	—N/a	Estonia	16	Malcolm Lincoln	"Siren"	English	Robin Juhkental	DNQ (14)
1160	4 *	—N/a	Slovakia	5	Kristína	"Horehronie"	Slovak	Martin Kavulič; Kamil Peteraj	DNQ (16)
1161	5 *	—N/a	Finland	44	Kuunkuiskaajat	"Työlki ellää"	Finnish	Timo Kiiskinen	DNQ (11)
1162	6 *	—N/a	Latvia	11	Aisha	"What For?"	English	Jānis Lūsēns; Guntars Račs	DNQ (17 ◁)
1163	7 *	8	Serbia	4	Milan Stanković	"Ovo je Balkan" (Oво je Балкан)	Serbian	Goran Bregović; Ljiljana Jorgovanović; Marina Tucaković	13 (5 †)
1164	8 *	6	Bosnia and Herzegovina	16	Vukašin Brajić	"Thunder and Lightning"	English	Dino Šaran	17 (8 †)
1165	9 *	—N/a	Poland	15	Marcin Mroziński	"Legenda"	English, Polish	Marcin Mroziński; Marcin Nierubiec	DNQ (13)
1166	10 *	7	Belgium	52	Tom Dice	"Me and My Guitar"	English	Tom Dice; Ashley Hicklin; Jeroen Swinnen	6 (1 †)
1167	11 *	—N/a	Malta	23	Thea Garrett	"My Dream"	English	Sunny Aquilina; Jason Cassar	DNQ (12)
1168	12 *	15	Albania	7	Juliana Pasha	"It's All About You"	English	Pirro Çako; Ardit Gjebrea	16 (6 †)
1169	13 *	11	Greece	31	Giorgos Alkaios and Friends	"Opa" (Ώπα)	Greek	Giorgos Alkaios; Giannis Antoniou and Friends	8 (2 †)
1170	14 *	23	Portugal	44	Filipa Azevedo	"Há dias assim"	Portuguese	Augusto Madureira	18 (4 †)
1171	15 *	—N/a	Macedonia	10	Gjoko Taneski (Note: Performance contains uncredited live vocals from Billy Zver)	"Jas ja imam silata" (Јас ја имам силата)	Macedonian	Kristijan Gabrovski	DNQ (15)
1172	16 *	9	Belarus	7	3+2 feat. Robert Wells	"Butterflies"	English	Malka Chaplin; Maxim Fadeev	24 (9 †)
1173	17 *	16	Iceland	23	Hera Björk	"Je ne sais quoi"	English	Hera Björk; Örlygur Smári	19 (3 †)
1174	1 **	—N/a	Lithuania	11	InCulto	"Eastern European Funk"	English	InCulto	DNQ (12)
1175	2 **	21	Armenia	5	Eva Rivas	"Apricot Stone"	English	Karen Kavaleryan; Armen Martirosyan	7 (6 †)
1176	3 **	24	Israel	33	Harel Skaat	"Milim" (מילים)	Hebrew	Tomer Adaddi; Noam Horev	14 (8 †)
1177	4 **	25	Denmark	39	Chanée and N'evergreen	"In a Moment like This"	English	Erik Bernholm; Thomas G:son; Henrik Sethsson	4 (5 †)
1178	5 **	—N/a	Switzerland	51	Michael von der Heide	"Il pleut de l'or"	French	André Grüter; Michael von der Heide; Heike Kospach; Pele Loriano	DNQ (17 ◁)
1179	6 **	—N/a	Sweden	50	Anna Bergendahl	"This Is My Life"	English	Kristian Lagerström; Bobby Ljunggren	DNQ (11)
1180	7 **	1	Azerbaijan	3	Safura	"Drip Drop"	English	Anders Bagge; Sandra Bjurman; Stefan Örn	5 (2 †)
1181	8 **	17	Ukraine	8	Alyosha	"Sweet People"	English	Olena Kucher; Borys Kukoba; Vadim Lisitsa	10 (7 †)
1182	9 **	—N/a	Netherlands	51	Sieneke	"Ik ben verliefd (Sha-la-lie)"	Dutch	Pierre Kartner	DNQ (14)
1183	10 **	19	Romania	12	Paula Seling and Ovi	"Playing with Fire"	English	Ovidiu Cernăuțeanu	3 (4 †)
1184	11 **	—N/a	Slovenia	16	Ansambel Žlindra and Kalamari	"Narodnozabavni rock"	Slovene	Marino Legovič; Leon Oblak	DNQ (16)
1185	12 **	10	Ireland	44	Niamh Kavanagh	"It's for You"	English	Lina Eriksson; Mårten Eriksson; Jonas Gladnikoff; Niall Mooney	23 (9 †)
1186	13 **	—N/a	Bulgaria	6	Miro	"Angel si ti" (Ангел си ти)	Bulgarian, English	Gordon Davis; Miroslav Kostadinov; Mihail Mihailov	DNQ (15)
1187	14 **	5	Cyprus	28	Jon Lilygreen and the Islanders	"Life Looks Better in Spring"	English	Melis Konstantinou; Nasos Lambrianides	21 (10 †)
1188	15 **	—N/a	Croatia	18	Feminnem	"Lako je sve"	Croatian	Branimir Mihaljević; Neda Parmać; Pamela Ramljak	DNQ (13)
1189	16 **	13	Georgia	3	Sofia Nizharadze	"Shine"	English	Christian Leuzzi; Harry Sommerdahl; Hanne Sørvaag	9 (3 †)
1190	17 **	14	Turkey	32	Manga	"We Could Be the Same"	English	Manga; Fiona Movery Akıncı; Evren Özdemir	2 (1 †)
1191	—N/a	2	Spain	50	Daniel Diges	"Algo pequeñito"	Spanish	Jesús Cañadilla; Daniel Diges; Alberto Jodar; Luis Miguel de la Varga	15
1192	—N/a	3	Norway	49	Didrik Solli-Tangen	"My Heart Is Yours"	English	Fredrik Kempe; Hanne Sørvaag	20
1193	—N/a	12	United Kingdom	53	Josh Dubovie	"That Sounds Good to Me"	English	Steve Crosby; Mike Stock; Pete Waterman	25 ◁
1194	—N/a	18	France	53	Jessy Matador	"Allez Ola Olé"	French	Jacques Ballue; Hugues Ducamin	12
1195	—N/a	22	Germany	54	Lena	"Satellite"	English	Julie Frost; John Gordon	1

Eurovision Song Contest 2011
#	R/O SF	R/O F	Country	#	Artist	Song	Language	Songwriter(s)	Placing
1196	1 *	—N/a	Poland	16	Magdalena Tul	"Jestem"	Polish	Magdalena Tul	DNQ (19 ◁)
1197	2 *	—N/a	Norway	50	Stella Mwangi	"Haba Haba"	English, Swahili	Beyond51; Big City; Stella Mwangi	DNQ (17)
1198	3 *	—N/a	Albania	8	Aurela Gaçe	"Feel the Passion"	English	Sokol Marsi; Shpëtim Saraçi	DNQ (14)
1199	4 *	—N/a	Armenia	6	Emmy	"Boom Boom"	English	Hayk Harutyunyan; Hayk Hovhannisyan; Sosi Khanikyan	DNQ (12)
1200	5 *	—N/a	Turkey	33	Yüksek Sadakat	"Live It Up"	English	Ergün Arsal; Kutlu Özmakinacı	DNQ (13)
1201	6 *	24	Serbia	5	Nina	"Čaroban" (Чаробан)	Serbian	Kristina Kovač	14 (8 †)
1202	7 *	10	Russia	15	Alexey Vorobyov	"Get You"	English, Russian	AJ Junior; Bilal "The Chef"; RedOne; Eric Sanicola; Alexey Vorobyov	16 (9 †)
1203	8 *	13	Switzerland	52	Anna Rossinelli	"In Love for a While"	English	David Klein	25 ◁ (10 †)
1204	9 *	25	Georgia	4	Eldrine	"One More Day"	English	Mikheil Chelidze; DJ BE$$; DJ Rock	9 (6 †)
1205	10 *	1	Finland	45	Paradise Oskar	"Da Da Dam"	English	Axel Ehnström	21 (3 †)
1206	11 *	—N/a	Malta	24	Glen Vella	"One Life"	English	Fleur Balzan; Paul Giordimaina	DNQ (11)
1207	12 *	—N/a	San Marino	2	Senit	"Stand By"	English	Radiosa Romani	DNQ (16)
1208	13 *	—N/a	Croatia	19	Daria	"Celebrate"	English	Boris Đurđević; Marina Mudrinić	DNQ (15)
1209	14 *	21	Iceland	24	Sjonni's Friends	"Coming Home"	English	Sjonni Brink; Þórunn Clausen	20 (4 †)
1210	15 *	5	Hungary	9	Kati Wolf	"What About My Dreams?"	English, Hungarian	Péter Geszti; Johnny K. Palmer; Gergő Rácz; Viktor Rakonczai	22 (7 †)
1211	16 *	—N/a	Portugal	45	Homens da Luta	"A luta é alegria"	Portuguese	Vasco Duarte; Jel	DNQ (18)
1212	17 *	4	Lithuania	12	Evelina Sašenko	"C'est ma vie"	English	Andrius Kairys; Paulius Zdanavičius	19 (5 †)
1213	18 *	19	Azerbaijan	4	Ell and Nikki	"Running Scared"	English	Sandra Bjurman; Iain James Farquharson; Stefan Örn	1 (2 †)
1214	19 *	9	Greece	32	Loukas Yorkas feat. Stereo Mike	"Watch My Dance"	English, Greek	Giannis Christodoulopoulos; Eleana Vrachali	7 (1 †)
1215	1 **	2	Bosnia and Herzegovina	17	Dino Merlin	"Love in Rewind"	English	Dino Merlin	6 (5 †)
1216	2 **	18	Austria	44	Nadine Beiler	"The Secret Is Love"	English	Nadine Beiler; Thomas Rabitsch	18 (7 †)
1217	3 **	—N/a	Netherlands	52	3JS	"Never Alone"	English	Jan Dulles; Jaap Kwakman; Jaap de Witte	DNQ (19 ◁)
1218	4 **	—N/a	Belgium	53	Witloof Bay	"With Love Baby"	English	Benoît Giaux; RoxorLoops	DNQ (11)
1219	5 **	—N/a	Slovakia	6	Twiins	"I'm Still Alive"	English	Branislav Jančich; Sandra Nordstrom; Bryan Todd	DNQ (13)
1220	6 **	23	Ukraine	9	Mika Newton	"Angel"	English	Ruslan Kvinta; Maryna Skomorohova	4 (6 †)
1221	7 **	15	Moldova	7	Zdob și Zdub	"So Lucky"	English	Marc Elsner; Mihai Gîncu; Roman Iagupov; Andy Schuman	12 (10 †)
1222	8 **	7	Sweden	51	Eric Saade	"Popular"	English	Fredrik Kempe	3 (1 †)
1223	9 **	—N/a	Cyprus	29	Christos Mylordos	"San aggelos s'agapisa" (Σαν άγγελος σ'αγάπησα)	Greek	Andreas Anastasiou; Mihalis Antoniou	DNQ (18)
1224	10 **	—N/a	Bulgaria	7	Poli Genova	"Na inat" (На инат)	Bulgarian	Sebastian Arman; David Bronner; Poli Genova; Borislav Milanov	DNQ (12)
1225	11 **	—N/a	Macedonia	11	Vlatko Ilievski	"Rusinka" (Русинкa)	Macedonian, English	Vladimir Dojčinovski; Jovan Jovanov; Grigor Koprov; Marko Marinković "Slatkaristika"	DNQ (16)
1226	12 **	—N/a	Israel	34	Dana International	"Ding Dong"	Hebrew, English	Dana International	DNQ (15)
1227	13 **	20	Slovenia	17	Maja Keuc	"No One"	English	Matjaž Vlašič; Urša Vlašič	13 (3 †)
1228	14 **	17	Romania	13	Hotel FM	"Change"	English	Gabriel Băruţa; Alexandra Ivan	17 (4 †)
1229	15 **	8	Estonia	17	Getter Jaani	"Rockefeller Street"	English	Sven Lõhmus	24 (9 †)
1230	16 **	—N/a	Belarus	8	Anastasia Vinnikova	"I Love Belarus"	English	Svetlana Geraskova; Eugene Oleynik	DNQ (14)
1231	17 **	—N/a	Latvia	12	Musiqq	"Angel in Disguise"	English	Marats Ogļezņevs	DNQ (17)
1232	18 **	3	Denmark	40	A Friend in London	"New Tomorrow"	English	Lise Cabble; Jakob Schack Glæsner	5 (2 †)
1233	19 **	6	Ireland	45	Jedward	"Lipstick"	English	Lars Halvor Jensen; Martin Michael Larsson; Daniel Priddy	8 (8 †)
1234	—N/a	11	France	54	Amaury Vassili	"Sognu"	Corsican	Quentin Bachelet; Jean-Pierre Marcellesi; Julie Miller; Daniel Moyne	15
1235	—N/a	12	Italy	37	Raphael Gualazzi	"Madness of Love"	Italian, English	Raffaele Gualazzi	2
1236	—N/a	14	United Kingdom	54	Blue	"I Can"	English	Ciaron Bell; Ben Collier; Ian Hope; Duncan James; Liam Keenan; Lee Ryan; StarSign	11
1237	—N/a	16	Germany	55	Lena	"Taken by a Stranger"	English	Monica Birkenes; Nicole Morier; Gus Seyffert	10
1238	—N/a	22	Spain	51	Lucía Pérez	"Que me quiten lo bailao"	Spanish	Rafael Artesero	23

Eurovision Song Contest 2012
#	R/O SF	R/O F	Country	#	Artist	Song	Language	Songwriter(s)	Placing
1239	1 *	—N/a	Montenegro	4	Rambo Amadeus	"Euro Neuro"	English	Rambo Amadeus	DNQ (15)
1240	2 *	7	Iceland	25	Greta Salóme and Jónsi	"Never Forget"	English	Greta Salóme	20 (8 †)
1241	3 *	16	Greece	33	Eleftheria Eleftheriou	"Aphrodisiac"	English	Dajana Lööf; Dimitri Stassos; Mikaela Stenström	17 (4 †)
1242	4 *	—N/a	Latvia	13	Anmary	"Beautiful Song"	English	Ivars Makstnieks; Rolands Ūdris	DNQ (16)
1243	5 *	3	Albania	9	Rona Nishliu	"Suus"	Albanian	Florent Boshnjaku; Rona Nishliu	5 (2 †)
1244	6 *	14	Romania	14	Mandinga	"Zaleilah"	Spanish, English	Elena Ionescu; Costi Ioniță; Omar Secada	12 (3 †)
1245	7 *	—N/a	Switzerland	53	Sinplus	"Unbreakable"	English	Gabriel Broggini; Ivan Broggini	DNQ (11)
1246	8 *	—N/a	Belgium	54	Iris	"Would You?"	English	Walter Mannaerts; Jean Bosco Safari; Nina Sampermans	DNQ (17)
1247	9 *	—N/a	Finland	46	Pernilla	"När jag blundar"	Swedish	Jonas Karlsson	DNQ (12)
1248	10 *	—N/a	Israel	35	Izabo	"Time"	English, Hebrew	Shiri Hadar; Ran Shem Tov	DNQ (13)
1249	11 *	—N/a	San Marino	3	Valentina Monetta	"The Social Network Song (Oh Oh – Uh – Oh Oh)"	English	José Juan Santana Rodriguez; Ralph Siegel; Timothy Touchton	DNQ (14)
1250	12 *	8	Cyprus	30	Ivi Adamou	"La La Love"	English	Björn Djupström; Alex Papaconstantinou; Viktor Svensson; Alexandra Zakka	16 (7 †)
1251	13 *	15	Denmark	41	Soluna Samay	"Should've Known Better"	English	Isam Bachiri; Chief 1; Remee; Amir Sulaiman	23 (9 †)
1252	14 *	6	Russia	16	Buranovskiye Babushki	"Party for Everybody"	Udmurt, English	Mary S. Applegate; Viktor Drobysh; Timofei Leontiev; Olga Tuktaryova	2 (1 †)
1253	15 *	2	Hungary	10	Compact Disco	"Sound of Our Hearts"	English	Behnam Lotfi; Gábor Pál; Attila Sándor; Csaba Walkó	24 (10 †)
1254	16 *	—N/a	Austria	45	Trackshittaz	"Woki mit deim Popo"	German (Note: Specifically Mühlviertlerisch, a Central Bavarian dialect spoken in Upper Austria)	Manuel Hoffelner; Lukas Plöchl	DNQ (18 ◁)
1255	17 *	26	Moldova	8	Pasha Parfeny	"Lăutar"	English	Alexandru Brașoveanu; Pasha Parfeni	11 (5 †)
1256	18 *	23	Ireland	46	Jedward	"Waterline"	English	Nick Jarl; Sharon Vaughn	19 (6 †)
1257	1 **	24	Serbia	6	Željko Joksimović	"Nije ljubav stvar" (Није љубав ствар)	Serbian	Željko Joksimović; Miloš Roganović; Marina Tucaković	3 (2 †)
1258	2 **	22	Macedonia	12	Kaliopi	"Crno i belo" (Црно и бело)	Macedonian	Romeo Grill; Kaliopi	13 (9 †)
1259	3 **	—N/a	Netherlands	53	Joan Franka	"You and Me"	English	Joan Franka; Jessica Hoogenboom	DNQ (15)
1260	4 **	21	Malta	25	Kurt Calleja	"This Is the Night"	English	Kurt Calleja; Mikael Gunnerås; Johan Jämtberg	21 (7 †)
1261	5 **	—N/a	Belarus	9	Litesound	"We Are the Heroes"	English	Dmitriy Karyakin; Vladimir Karyakin	DNQ (16)
1262	6 **	—N/a	Portugal	46	Filipa Sousa	"Vida minha"	Portuguese	Andrej Babić; Carlos Coelho	DNQ (13)
1263	7 **	25	Ukraine	10	Gaitana	"Be My Guest"	English	Gaitana; Kiwi Project	15 (8 †)
1264	8 **	—N/a	Bulgaria	8	Sofi Marinova	"Love Unlimited"	Bulgarian	Krum Georgiev; Iasen Kozev; Donka Vasileva	DNQ (11)
1265	9 **	—N/a	Slovenia	18	Eva Boto	"Verjamem"	Slovene	Vladimir Graić; Igor Pirkovič; Hari Varešanović	DNQ (17)
1266	10 **	—N/a	Croatia	20	Nina Badrić	"Nebo"	Croatian	Nina Badrić	DNQ (12)
1267	11 **	17	Sweden	52	Loreen	"Euphoria"	English	Peter Boström; Thomas G:son	1 (1 †)
1268	12 **	—N/a	Georgia	5	Anri Jokhadze	"I'm a Joker"	English, Georgian	Bibi Kvachadze; Rusudan Chkhaidze	DNQ (14)
1269	13 **	18	Turkey	34	Can Bonomo	"Love Me Back"	English	Can Bonomo	7 (5 †)
1270	14 **	11	Estonia	18	Ott Lepland	"Kuula"	Estonian	Aapo Ilves; Ott Lepland	6 (4 †)
1271	15 **	—N/a	Slovakia	7	Max Jason Mai	"Don't Close Your Eyes"	English	Max Jason Mai	DNQ (18 ◁)
1272	16 **	12	Norway	51	Tooji	"Stay"	English	Figge Boström; Peter Boström; Tooji	26 ◁ (10 †)
1273	17 **	5	Bosnia and Herzegovina	18	Maya Sar	"Korake ti znam"	Bosnian	Maja Sarihodžić	18 (6 †)
1274	18 **	4	Lithuania	13	Donny Montell	"Love Is Blind"	English	Brandon Stone; Jodie Rose	14 (3 †)
1275	—N/a	1	United Kingdom	55	Engelbert Humperdinck	"Love Will Set You Free"	English	Sacha Skarbek; Martin Terefe	25
1276	—N/a	9	France	55	Anggun	"Echo (You and I)"	French, English	Anggun; Jean-Pierre Pilot; William Rousseau	22
1277	—N/a	10	Italy	38	Nina Zilli	"L'amore è femmina (Out of Love)"	English, Italian	Charlie Mason; Frida Molander; Christian Rabb; Kristoffer Sjökvist; Nina Zilli	9
1278	—N/a	13	Azerbaijan	5	Sabina Babayeva	"When the Music Dies"	English	Anders Bagge; Sandra Bjurman; Johan Kronlund; Stefan Örn	4
1279	—N/a	19	Spain	52	Pastora Soler	"Quédate conmigo"	Spanish	Erik Bernholm; Thomas G:son; Antonio Sánchez	10
1280	—N/a	20	Germany	56	Roman Lob	"Standing Still"	English	Jamie Cullum; Wayne Hector; Steve Robson	8

Eurovision Song Contest 2013
#	R/O SF	R/O F	Country	#	Artist	Song	Language	Songwriter(s)	Placing
1281	1 *	—N/a	Austria	46	Natália Kelly	"Shine"	English	Andreas Grass; Alexander Kahr; Natália Kelly; Nikola Paryla	DNQ (14)
1282	2 *	7	Estonia	19	Birgit	"Et uus saaks alguse"	Estonian	Mihkel Mattisen; Silvia Soro	20 (10 †)
1283	3 *	—N/a	Slovenia	19	Hannah	"Straight into Love"	English	Hannah Mancini; Erik Margan; Marko Primužak; Matija Rodić; Gregor Zemljič	DNQ (16 ◁)
1284	4 *	—N/a	Croatia	21	Klapa s Mora	"Mižerja"	Croatian	Goran Topolovac	DNQ (13)
1285	5 *	18	Denmark	42	Emmelie de Forest	"Only Teardrops"	English	Lise Cabble; Julia Fabrin Jakobsen; Thomas Stengaard	1 (1 †)
1286	6 *	10	Russia	17	Dina Garipova	"What If"	English	Gabriel Alares; Joakim Björnberg; Leonid Gutkin	5 (2 †)
1287	7 *	22	Ukraine	11	Zlata Ognevich	"Gravity"	English	Karen Kavaleryan; Mikhail Nekrasov	3 (3 †)
1288	8 *	13	Netherlands	54	Anouk	"Birds"	English	Martin Gjerstad; Tore Johansson; Anouk Teeuwe	9 (6 †)
1289	9 *	—N/a	Montenegro	5	Who See (Note: Performance contains uncredited live vocals from Nina Žižić)	"Igranka" (Игранка)	Montenegrin	Dejan Dedović; Mario Đorđević; Đorđe Miljenović	DNQ (12)
1290	10 *	2	Lithuania	14	Andrius Pojavis	"Something"	English	Andrius Pojavis	22 (9 †)
1291	11 *	8	Belarus	10	Alyona Lanskaya	"Solayoh"	English	Martin King; Marc Paelinck	16 (7 †)
1292	12 *	3	Moldova	9	Aliona Moon	"O mie"	Romanian	Pasha Parfeny; Yuliana Scutaru	11 (4 †)
1293	13 *	26	Ireland	47	Ryan Dolan	"Only Love Survives"	English	Wez Devine; Ryan Dolan	26 ◁ (8 †)
1294	14 *	—N/a	Cyprus	31	Despina Olympiou	"An me thimasai" (Aν με θυμάσαι)	Greek	Andreas Giorgallis; Zenon Zindilis	DNQ (15)
1295	15 *	6	Belgium	55	Roberto Bellarosa	"Love Kills"	English	Jukka Immonen; Iain James	12 (5 †)
1296	16 *	—N/a	Serbia	7	Moje 3	"Ljubav je svuda" (Љубав је свуда)	Serbian	Saša Milošević Mare; Marina Tucaković	DNQ (11)
1297	1 **	—N/a	Latvia	14	PeR	"Here We Go"	English	Arturas Burke; Ralfs Eilands	DNQ (17 ◁)
1298	2 **	—N/a	San Marino	4	Valentina Monetta	"Crisalide (Vola)"	Italian	Mauro Balestri; Ralph Siegel	DNQ (11)
1299	3 **	—N/a	Macedonia	13	Esma and Lozano	"Pred da se razdeni" (Пред да се раздени)	Macedonian, Romani	Simeon Atanasov; Magdalena Cvetkovska; Lazar Cvetkoski; Darko Dimitrov	DNQ (16)
1300	4 **	20	Azerbaijan	6	Farid Mammadov	"Hold Me"	English	John Ballard; Ralph Charlie; Dimitris Kontopoulos	2 (1 †)
1301	5 **	4	Finland	47	Krista Siegfrids	"Marry Me"	English	Kristoffer Karlsson; Jessica Lundström; Erik Nyholm; Krista Siegfrids	24 (9 †)
1302	6 **	9	Malta	26	Gianluca	"Tomorrow"	English	Boris Cezek; Dean Muscat	8 (4 †)
1303	7 **	—N/a	Bulgaria	9	Elitsa Todorova and Stoyan Yankoulov	"Samo shampioni" (Само шампиони)	Bulgarian	Kristian Talev; Elitsa Todorova	DNQ (12)
1304	8 **	19	Iceland	26	Eythor Ingi	"Ég á líf"	Icelandic	Örlygur Smári; Pétur Örn Guðmundsson	17 (6 †)
1305	9 **	21	Greece	34	Koza Mostra feat. Agathon Iakovidis	"Alcohol Is Free"	Greek	Ilias Kozas; Stathis Pachidis	6 (2 †)
1306	10 **	—N/a	Israel	36	Moran Mazor	"Rak Bishvilo" (רק בשבילו)	Hebrew	Chen Harari; Gal Sarig	DNQ (14)
1307	11 **	12	Armenia	7	Dorians	"Lonely Planet"	English	Tony Iommi; Vardan Zadoyan	18 (7 †)
1308	12 **	17	Hungary	11	ByeAlex	"Kedvesem" (Zoohacker Remix)	Hungarian	Alex Márta; Zoltán Palásti Kovács	10 (8 †)
1309	13 **	24	Norway	52	Margaret Berger	"I Feed You My Love"	English	Robin Lynch; Niklas Olovson; Karin Park	4 (3 †)
1310	14 **	—N/a	Albania	10	Adrian Lulgjuraj and Bledar Sejko	"Identitet"	Albanian	Bledar Sejko; Eda Sejko	DNQ (15)
1311	15 **	25	Georgia	6	Nodi Tatishvili and Sophie Gelovani	"Waterfall"	English	Erik Bernholm; Thomas G:son	15 (10 †)
1312	16 **	—N/a	Switzerland	54	Takasa	"You and Me"	English	Roman Camenzind; Fred Herrmann; Georg Schlunegger	DNQ (13)
1313	17 **	14	Romania	15	Cezar	"It's My Life"	English	Cristian Faur	13 (5 †)
1314	—N/a	1	France	56	Amandine Bourgeois	"L'Enfer et moi"	French	Boris Bergman; David Salkin	23
1315	—N/a	5	Spain	53	ESDM	"Contigo hasta el final"	Spanish	David Feito; Raquel del Rosario; Juan Luis Suárez	25
1316	—N/a	11	Germany	57	Cascada	"Glorious"	English	Andres Ballinas; Tony Cornelissen; Yann Peifer; Manuel Reuter	21
1317	—N/a	15	United Kingdom	56	Bonnie Tyler	"Believe in Me"	English	Christopher Braide; Desmond Child; Lauren Christy	19
1318	—N/a	16	Sweden	53	Robin Stjernberg	"You"	English	Joy Deb; Linnea Deb; Joakim Harestad Haukaas; Robin Stjernberg	14
1319	—N/a	23	Italy	39	Marco Mengoni	"L'essenziale"	Italian	Roberto Casalino; Francesco De Benedittis; Marco Mengoni	7

Eurovision Song Contest 2014
#	R/O SF	R/O F	Country	#	Artist	Song	Language	Songwriter(s)	Placing
1320	1 *	7	Armenia	8	Aram Mp3	"Not Alone"	English	Aram Mp3; Garik Papoyan	4 (4 †)
1321	2 *	—N/a	Latvia	15	Aarzemnieki	"Cake to Bake"	English	Guntis Veilands	DNQ (13)
1322	3 *	—N/a	Estonia	20	Tanja	"Amazing"	English	Tanja; Timo Vendt	DNQ (12)
1323	4 *	13	Sweden	54	Sanna Nielsen	"Undo"	English	Fredrik Kempe; David Kreuger; Hamed "K-One" Pirouzpanah	3 (2 †)
1324	5 *	4	Iceland	27	Pollapönk	"No Prejudice"	English	John Grant; Haraldur Freyr Gíslason; Heiðar Örn Kristjánsson	15 (8 †)
1325	6 *	—N/a	Albania	11	Hersi	"One Night's Anger"	English	Gentian Lako; Jorgo Papingji	DNQ (15)
1326	7 *	15	Russia	18	Tolmachevy Sisters	"Shine"	English	John Ballard; Gerard James Borg; Ralph Charlie; Philipp Kirkorov; Dimitris Kontopoulos	7 (6 †)
1327	8 *	3	Azerbaijan	7	Dilara Kazimova	"Start a Fire"	English	Alessandra Günthardt; Johan Kronlund; Stefan Örn	22 (9 †)
1328	9 *	1	Ukraine	12	Mariya Yaremchuk	"Tick-Tock"	English	Sandra Bjurman; Mariya Yaremchuk	6 (5 †)
1329	10 *	—N/a	Belgium	56	Axel Hirsoux	"Mother"	English	Rafael Artesero; Ashley Hicklin	DNQ (14)
1330	11 *	—N/a	Moldova	10	Cristina Scarlat	"Wild Soul"	English	Ivan Akulov; Lidia Scarlat	DNQ (16 ◁)
1331	12 *	25	San Marino	5	Valentina Monetta	"Maybe"	English	Mauro Balestri; Ralph Siegel	24 (10 †)
1332	13 *	—N/a	Portugal	47	Suzy	"Quero ser tua"	Portuguese	Emanuel	DNQ (11)
1333	14 *	24	Netherlands	55	The Common Linnets	"Calm After the Storm"	English	Matthew Crosby; Rob Crosby; Ilse DeLange; Jake Etheridge; JB Meijers	2 (1 †)
1334	15 *	8	Montenegro	6	Sergej Ćetković	"Moj svijet" (Мој свијет)	Montenegrin	Sergej Ćetković; Emina Sandal	19 (7 †)
1335	16 *	21	Hungary	12	András Kállay-Saunders	"Running"	English	András Kállay-Saunders; Krisztián Szakos	5 (3 †)
1336	1 **	22	Malta	27	Firelight	"Coming Home"	English	Richard Edwards Micallef	23 (9 †)
1337	2 **	—N/a	Israel	37	Mei Finegold	"Same Heart"	English, Hebrew	Rami Talmid	DNQ (14)
1338	3 **	5	Norway	53	Carl Espen	"Silent Storm"	English	Josefin Winther	8 (6 †)
1339	4 **	—N/a	Georgia	7	The Shin and Mariko	"Three Minutes to Earth"	English	Eugen Eliu; Zaza Miminoshvili	DNQ (15 ◁)
1340	5 **	9	Poland	17	Donatan and Cleo	"My Słowianie – We Are Slavic"	Polish, English	Cleo; Donatan	14 (8 †)
1341	6 **	11	Austria	47	Conchita Wurst	"Rise Like a Phoenix"	English	Julian Maas; Charly Mason; Joey Patulka; Ali Zuckowski	1 (1 †)
1342	7 **	—N/a	Lithuania	15	Vilija	"Attention"	English	Vilija Matačiūnaitė; Viktoras Vaupšas	DNQ (11)
1343	8 **	18	Finland	48	Softengine	"Something Better"	English	Topi Latukka; Henri Oskár	11 (3 †)
1344	9 **	—N/a	Ireland	48	Can-linn feat. Kasey Smith	"Heartbeat"	English	Jonas Gladnikoff; Patrizia Helander; Hazel Kaneswaran; Rasmus Palmgren	DNQ (12)
1345	10 **	2	Belarus	11	Teo	"Cheesecake"	English	Dmitry Novik; Yury Vashchuk	16 (5 †)
1346	11 **	—N/a	Macedonia	14	Tijana	"To the Sky"	English	Lazar Cvetkoski; Darko Dimitrov; Elena Risteska Ivanovska	DNQ (13)
1347	12 **	20	Switzerland	55	Sebalter	"Hunter of Stars"	English	Sebastiano Paù-Lessi	13 (4 †)
1348	13 **	10	Greece	35	Freaky Fortune feat. RiskyKidd	"Rise Up"	English	Freaky Fortune; RiskyKidd	20 (7 †)
1349	14 **	17	Slovenia	20	Tinkara Kovač	"Round and Round"	English, Slovene	Tinkara Kovač; Hannah Mancini; Tina Piš; Raay	25 (10 †)
1350	15 **	6	Romania	16	Paula Seling and Ovi	"Miracle"	English	Frida Amundsen; Beyond51; Philip Halloun; Ovi	12 (2 †)
1351	—N/a	12	Germany	58	Elaiza	"Is It Right"	English	Adam Kesselhaut; Frank Kretschmer; Elżbieta Steinmetz	18
1352	—N/a	14	France	57	Twin Twin	"Moustache"	French	François Ardouvin; Lorent Ardouvin; Pierre Beyres; Kim N'Guyen	26 ◁
1353	—N/a	16	Italy	40	Emma	"La mia città"	Italian	Emma Marrone	21
1354	—N/a	19	Spain	54	Ruth Lorenzo	"Dancing in the Rain"	English, Spanish	Julian Emery; James Lawrence Irvin; Ruth Lorenzo	10
1355	—N/a	23	Denmark	43	Basim	"Cliche Love Song"	English	Daniel Fält; Lasse Lindorff; Basim Moujahid; Kim Nowak-Zorde	9
1356	—N/a	26	United Kingdom	57	Molly	"Children of the Universe"	English	Anders Hansson; Molly Smitten-Downes	17

Eurovision Song Contest 2015
#	R/O SF	R/O F	Country	#	Artist	Song	Language	Songwriter(s)	Placing
1357	1 *	—N/a	Moldova	11	Eduard Romanyuta	"I Want Your Love"	English	Hayley Aitken; Tom Andrews; Erik Lewander	DNQ (11)
1358	2 *	6	Armenia	9	Genealogy	"Face the Shadow"	English	Armen Martirosyan; Inna Mkrtchyan	16 (7 †)
1359	3 *	13	Belgium	57	Loïc Nottet	"Rhythm Inside"	English	Loïc Nottet; Beverly Jo Scott	4 (2 †)
1360	4 *	—N/a	Netherlands	56	Trijntje Oosterhuis	"Walk Along"	English	Tobias Karlsson; Anouk Teeuwe	DNQ (14)
1361	5 *	—N/a	Finland	49	Pertti Kurikan Nimipäivät	"Aina mun pitää"	Finnish	Pertti Kurikan Nimipäivät	DNQ (16 ◁)
1362	6 *	15	Greece	36	Maria Elena Kyriakou	"One Last Breath"	English	Vangelis Konstantinidis; Maria Elena Kyriakou; Efthivoulos Theocharous; Evelina Tziora	19 (6 †)
1363	7 *	4	Estonia	21	Elina Born and Stig Rästa	"Goodbye to Yesterday"	English	Stig Rästa	7 (3 †)
1364	8 *	—N/a	Macedonia	15	Daniel Kajmakoski	"Autumn Leaves"	English	Robert Bilbilov; Joacim Persson	DNQ (15)
1365	9 *	8	Serbia	8	Bojana Stamenov	"Beauty Never Lies"	English	Vladimir Graić; Charlie Mason	10 (9 †)
1366	10 *	22	Hungary	13	Boggie	"Wars for Nothing"	English	Sára Hélène Bori; Boglárka Csemer; Áron Sebestyén	20 (8 †)
1367	11 *	—N/a	Belarus	12	Uzari and Maimuna	"Time"	English	Gerylana; Maimuna; Uzari	DNQ (12)
1368	12 *	25	Russia	19	Polina Gagarina	"A Million Voices"	English	Gabriel Alares; Joakim Björnberg; Leonid Gutkin; Vladimir Matetsky; Katrina Noorbergen	2 (1 †)
1369	13 *	—N/a	Denmark	44	Anti Social Media	"The Way You Are"	English	Chief 1; Remee	DNQ (13)
1370	14 *	26	Albania	12	Elhaida Dani	"I'm Alive"	English	Arbër Elshani; Kristijan Lekaj; Sokol Marsi	17 (10 †)
1371	15 *	20	Romania	17	Voltaj	"De la capăt"	Romanian, English	Victor Răzvan Alstani; Gabriel Constantin; Adrian Cristescu; Călin Gavril Goia; Andrei Mădalin Leonte; Silviu Marian Păduraru; Monica-Ana Stevens	15 (5 †)
1372	16 *	23	Georgia	8	Nina Sublatti	"Warrior"	English	Thomas G:son; Nina Sublatti	11 (4 †)
1373	1 **	7	Lithuania	16	Monika Linkytė and Vaidas Baumila	"This Time"	English	Vytautas Bikus; Monika Liubinaitė	18 (7 †)
1374	2 **	—N/a	Ireland	49	Molly Sterling	"Playing with Numbers"	English	Greg French; Molly Sterling	DNQ (12)
1375	3 **	—N/a	San Marino	6	Anita Simoncini and Michele Perniola	"Chain of Lights"	English	John O'Flynn; Ralph Siegel	DNQ (16)
1376	4 **	16	Montenegro	7	Knez	"Adio" (Адио)	Montenegrin	Dejan Ivanović; Željko Joksimović; Marina Tucaković	13 (9 †)
1377	5 **	—N/a	Malta	28	Amber	"Warrior"	English	Matt "Muxu" Mercieca; Elton Zarb	DNQ (11)
1378	6 **	9	Norway	54	Mørland and Debrah Scarlett	"A Monster Like Me"	English	Kjetil Mørland	8 (4 †)
1379	7 **	—N/a	Portugal	48	Leonor Andrade	"Há um mar que nos separa"	Portuguese	Miguel Gameiro	DNQ (14)
1380	8 **	—N/a	Czech Republic	4	Marta Jandová and Václav Noid Bárta	"Hope Never Dies"	English	Václav Noid Bárta; Tereza Šoralová	DNQ (13)
1381	9 **	3	Israel	38	Nadav Guedj	"Golden Boy"	English	Doron Medalie	9 (3 †)
1382	10 **	19	Latvia	16	Aminata	"Love Injected"	English	Aminata Savadogo	6 (2 †)
1383	11 **	24	Azerbaijan	8	Elnur Hüseynov	"Hour of the Wolf"	English	Sandra Bjurman; Lina Hansson; Nicklas Lif; Nicolas Rebscher	12 (10 †)
1384	12 **	—N/a	Iceland	28	Maria Olafs	"Unbroken"	English	Ásgeir Orri Ásgeirsson; María Ólafsdóttir; Pálmi Ragnar Ásgeirsson; Sæþór Kristjánsson	DNQ (15)
1385	13 **	10	Sweden	55	Måns Zelmerlöw	"Heroes"	English	Joy Deb; Linnea Deb; Anton Hård af Segerstad	1 (1 †)
1386	14 **	—N/a	Switzerland	56	Mélanie René	"Time to Shine"	English	Mélanie René	DNQ (17 ◁)
1387	15 **	11	Cyprus	32	John Karayiannis	"One Thing I Should Have Done"	English	Mike Connaris	22 (6 †)
1388	16 **	1	Slovenia	21	Maraaya	"Here for You"	English	Charlie Mason; Raay; Marjetka Vovk	14 (5 †)
1389	17 **	18	Poland	18	Monika Kuszyńska	"In the Name of Love"	English	Monika Kuszyńska; Jakub Raczyński	23 (8 †)
1390	—N/a	2	France	58	Lisa Angell	"N'oubliez pas"	French	M. Albert; Michel Illouz; Laure Izon	25
1391	—N/a	5	United Kingdom	58	Electro Velvet	"Still in Love with You"	English	Adrian Bax White; David Mindel	24
1392	—N/a	12	Australia	1	Guy Sebastian	"Tonight Again"	English	David Ryan Harris; Louis Schoorl; Guy Sebastian	5
1393	—N/a	14	Austria	48	The Makemakes	"I Am Yours"	English	Jimmy Harry; The Makemakes	26
1394	—N/a	17	Germany	59	Ann Sophie	"Black Smoke"	English	Michael Harwood; Ella McMahon; Tonino Speciale	27 ◁
1395	—N/a	21	Spain	55	Edurne	"Amanecer"	Spanish	Peter Boström; Thomas G:son; Tony Sánchez-Ohlsson	21
1396	—N/a	27	Italy	41	Il Volo	"Grande amore"	Italian	Francesco Boccia; Ciro Esposito	3

Eurovision Song Contest 2016
#	R/O SF	R/O F	Country	#	Artist	Song	Language	Songwriter(s)	Placing
1397	1 *	—N/a	Finland	50	Sandhja	"Sing It Away"	English	Heikki Korhonen; Sandhja Kuivalainen; Petri Matara; Milos Rosas; Markus Savijoki	DNQ (15)
1398	2 *	—N/a	Greece	37	Argo	"Utopian Land"	English, Greek	Vladimiros Sofianides	DNQ (16)
1399	3 *	—N/a	Moldova	12	Lidia Isac	"Falling Stars"	English	Gabriel Alares; Ellen Berg; Leonid Gutkin; Sebastian Lestapier	DNQ (17)
1400	4 *	5	Hungary	14	Freddie	"Pioneer"	English	Borbála Csarnai; Zé Szabó	19 (4 †)
1401	5 *	17	Croatia	22	Nina Kraljić	"Lighthouse"	English	Andreas Grass; Nikola Paryla	23 (10 †)
1402	6 *	3	Netherlands	57	Douwe Bob	"Slow Down"	English	Matthijs van Duijvenbode; Jan Peter Hoekstra; Jeroen Overman; Douwe Bob Posthuma	11 (5 †)
1403	7 *	26	Armenia	10	Iveta Mukuchyan	"LoveWave"	English	Stephanie Crutchfield; Iveta Mukuchyan; Levon Navasardyan; Lilith Navasardyan	7 (2 †)
1404	8 *	—N/a	San Marino	7	Serhat	"I Didn't Know"	English	Olcayto Ahmet Tuğsuz; Nektarios Tyrakis	DNQ (12)
1405	9 *	18	Russia	20	Sergey Lazarev	"You Are the Only One"	English	John Ballard; Ralph Charlie; Dimitris Kontopoulos; Philipp Kirkorov	3 (1 †)
1406	10 *	2	Czech Republic	5	Gabriela Gunčíková	"I Stand"	English	Sara Biglert; Aidan O'Connor; Christian Schneider	25 (9 †)
1407	11 *	14	Cyprus	33	Minus One	"Alter Ego"	English	Thomas G:son; Minus One	21 (8 †)
1408	12 *	24	Austria	49	Zoë	"Loin d'ici"	French	Christof Straub; Zoë Straub	13 (7 †)
1409	13 *	—N/a	Estonia	22	Jüri Pootsmann	"Play"	English	Vallo Kikas; Fred Krieger; Stig Rästa	DNQ (18 ◁)
1410	14 *	4	Azerbaijan	9	Samra	"Miracle"	English	Amir Aly; Jakob "T.I Jakke" Erixson; Henrik Wikström	17 (6 †)
1411	15 *	—N/a	Montenegro	8	Highway	"The Real Thing"	English	Maro Market; Srđan Sekulović "Skansi"; Luka Vojvodić	DNQ (13)
1412	16 *	—N/a	Iceland	29	Greta Salóme	"Hear Them Calling"	English	Greta Salóme Stefánsdóttir	DNQ (14)
1413	17 *	—N/a	Bosnia and Herzegovina	19	Dalal and Deen feat. Ana Rucner and Jala	"Ljubav je"	Bosnian	Almir Ajanović; Jasmin Fazlić "Jala"	DNQ (11)
1414	18 *	22	Malta	29	Ira Losco	"Walk on Water"	English	Lisa Desmond; Tim Larsson; Ira Losco; Tobias Lundgren; Molly Pettersson Hammar	12 (3 †)
1415	1 **	20	Latvia	17	Justs	"Heartbeat"	English	Aminata Savadogo	15 (8 †)
1416	2 **	12	Poland	19	Michał Szpak	"Color of Your Life"	English	Andy Palmer; Kamil Varen	8 (6 †)
1417	3 **	—N/a	Switzerland	57	Rykka	"The Last of Our Kind"	English	Jeff Dawson; Mike James; Warne Livesey; Christina Maria Rieder	DNQ (18 ◁)
1418	4 **	7	Israel	39	Hovi Star	"Made of Stars"	English	Doron Medalie	14 (7 †)
1419	5 **	—N/a	Belarus	13	Ivan	"Help You Fly"	English	Mary Susane Applegate; Viktor Drobysh; Alexander Ivanov; Timofei Leontiev	DNQ (12)
1420	6 **	15	Serbia	9	Sanja Vučić Zaa	"Goodbye (Shelter)"	English	Ivana Peters	18 (10 †)
1421	7 **	—N/a	Ireland	50	Nicky Byrne	"Sunlight"	English	Nicky Byrne; Ronan Hardiman; Wayne Hector	DNQ (15)
1422	8 **	—N/a	Macedonia	16	Kaliopi	"Dona" (Дона)	Macedonian	Romeo Grill; Kaliopi	DNQ (11)
1423	9 **	16	Lithuania	17	Donny Montell	"I've Been Waiting for This Night"	English	Beatrice Robertsson; Jonas Thander	9 (4 †)
1424	10 **	13	Australia	2	Dami Im	"Sound of Silence"	English	Anthony Egizii; David Musumeci	2 (1 †)
1425	11 **	—N/a	Slovenia	22	ManuElla	"Blue and Red"	English	Manuella Brečko; Marjan Hvala; Leon Oblak	DNQ (14)
1426	12 **	8	Bulgaria	10	Poli Genova	"If Love Was a Crime"	English	Sebastian Arman; Poli Genova; Borislav Milanov; Joacim Persson	4 (5 †)
1427	13 **	—N/a	Denmark	45	Lighthouse X	"Soldiers of Love"	English	Søren Bregendal; Daniel Durn; Katrine Klith Andersen; Johannes Nymark; Sebastian Owens; Martin Skriver	DNQ (17)
1428	14 **	21	Ukraine	13	Jamala	"1944"	English, Crimean Tatar	Jamala	1 (2 †)
1429	15 **	—N/a	Norway	55	Agnete	"Icebreaker"	English	Gabriel Alares; Ian Curnow; Agnete K. Johnsen	DNQ (13)
1430	16 **	23	Georgia	9	Nika Kocharov and Young Georgian Lolitaz	"Midnight Gold"	English	Thomas G:son; Kote Kalandadze	20 (9 †)
1431	17 **	—N/a	Albania	13	Eneda Tarifa	"Fairytale"	English	Olsa Toqi	DNQ (16)
1432	18 **	1	Belgium	58	Laura Tesoro	"What's the Pressure"	English	Louis Favre; Sanne Putseys; Birsen Uçar; Yannick Werther	10 (3 †)
1433	—N/a	6	Italy	42	Francesca Michielin	"No Degree of Separation"	Italian, English	Federica Abbate; Cheope; Fabio Gargiulo; Norma Jean Martine; Francesca Michielin	16
1434	—N/a	9	Sweden	56	Frans	"If I Were Sorry"	English	Fredrik Andersson; Oscar Fogelström; Frans Jeppsson Wall; Michael Saxell	5
1435	—N/a	10	Germany	60	Jamie-Lee	"Ghost"	English	Thomas Burchia; Conrad Hensel; Anna Leyne	26 ◁
1436	—N/a	11	France	59	Amir	"J'ai cherché"	French, English	Johan Errami; Amir Haddad; Nazim Khaled	6
1437	—N/a	19	Spain	56	Barei	"Say Yay!"	English	Barei; Víctor Púa; Ruben Villanueva	22
1438	—N/a	25	United Kingdom	59	Joe and Jake	"You're Not Alone"	English	Justin J. Benson; S. Kanes; Matt Schwartz	24

Eurovision Song Contest 2017
#	R/O SF	R/O F	Country	#	Artist	Song	Language	Songwriter(s)	Placing
1439	1 *	24	Sweden	57	Robin Bengtsson	"I Can't Go On"	English	David Kreuger; Hamed "K-One" Pirouzpanah; Robin Stjernberg	5 (3 †)
1440	2 *	—N/a	Georgia	10	Tamara Gachechiladze	"Keep the Faith"	English	Tamara Gachechiladze; Anri Jokhadze	DNQ (11)
1441	3 *	14	Australia	3	Isaiah	"Don't Come Easy"	English	Michael Angelo; Anthony Egizii; David Musumeci	9 (6 †)
1442	4 *	—N/a	Albania	14	Lindita	"World"	English	Big Basta; Lindita; Klodian Qafoku	DNQ (14)
1443	5 *	23	Belgium	59	Blanche	"City Lights"	English	Emmanuel Delcourt; Ellie Delvaux; Pierre Dumoulin	4 (4 †)
1444	6 *	—N/a	Montenegro	9	Slavko Kalezić	"Space"	English	Iva Boršić; Adis Eminić; Momčilo Zeković "Zeko"	DNQ (16)
1445	7 *	—N/a	Finland	51	Norma John	"Blackbird"	English	Lasse Piirainen; Leena Tirronen	DNQ (12)
1446	8 *	12	Azerbaijan	10	Dihaj	"Skeletons"	English	Sandra Bjurman; Isa Melikov	14 (8 †)
1447	9 *	11	Portugal	49	Salvador Sobral	"Amar pelos dois"	Portuguese	Luísa Sobral	1 (1 †)
1448	10 *	15	Greece	38	Demy	"This Is Love"	English	John Ballard; Dimitris Kontopoulos; Romy Papadea	19 (10 †)
1449	11 *	2	Poland	20	Kasia Moś	"Flashlight"	English	Pete Barringer; Rickard Bonde Truumeel; Kasia Moś	22 (9 †)
1450	12 *	7	Moldova	13	SunStroke Project	"Hey Mamma"	English	Mihail Cebotarenco; Alina Galetskaya; Anton Ragoza; Sergey Stepanov; Sergei Yalovitsky	3 (2 †)
1451	13 *	—N/a	Iceland	30	Svala	"Paper"	English	Einar Egilsson; Lily Elise; Lester Mendez; Svala Björgvinsdóttir	DNQ (15)
1452	14 *	—N/a	Czech Republic	6	Martina Bárta	"My Turn"	English	DWB; Kyler Niko	DNQ (13)
1453	15 *	19	Cyprus	34	Hovig	"Gravity"	English	Thomas G:son	21 (5 †)
1454	16 *	5	Armenia	11	Artsvik	"Fly with Me"	English	Avet Barseghyan; Levon Navasardyan; Lilith Navasaryan; David Tserunyan	18 (7 †)
1455	17 *	—N/a	Slovenia	23	Omar Naber	"On My Way"	English	Omar Naber; Žiga Pirnat	DNQ (17)
1456	18 *	—N/a	Latvia	18	Triana Park	"Line"	English	Kristaps Ērglis; Agnese Rakovska; Kristians Rakovskis	DNQ (18 ◁)
1457	1 **	—N/a	Serbia	10	Tijana Bogićević	"In Too Deep"	English	Johan Alkenäs; Lisa Desmond; Borislav Milanov; Joacim Persson	DNQ (11)
1458	2 **	4	Austria	50	Nathan Trent	"Running on Air"	English	Bernhard Penzias; Nathan Trent	16 (7 †)
1459	3 **	—N/a	Macedonia	17	Jana Burčeska	"Dance Alone"	English	Florence A.; Johan Alkenäs; Borislav Milanov; Joacim Persson	DNQ (15)
1460	4 **	—N/a	Malta	30	Claudia Faniello	"Breathlessly"	English	Gerard James Borg; Philip Vella; Sean Vella	DNQ (16)
1461	5 **	20	Romania	18	Ilinca feat. Alex Florea	"Yodel It!"	English	Mihai Alexandru; Alexa Niculae	7 (6 †)
1462	6 **	6	Netherlands	58	OG3NE	"Lights and Shadows"	English	Rory de Kievit; Rick Vol	11 (4 †)
1463	7 **	8	Hungary	15	Joci Pápai	"Origo"	Hungarian	József Pápai	8 (2 †)
1464	8 **	10	Denmark	46	Anja	"Where I Am"	English	Michael D'Arcy; Anja Nissen; Angel Tupai	20 (10 †)
1465	9 **	—N/a	Ireland	51	Brendan Murray	"Dying to Try"	English	Jörgen Elofsson; James Newman	DNQ (13)
1466	10 **	—N/a	San Marino	8	Valentina Monetta and Jimmie Wilson	"Spirit of the Night"	English	Steven Barnacle; Ralph Siegel; Jutta Staudenmayer	DNQ (18 ◁)
1467	11 **	13	Croatia	23	Jacques Houdek	"My Friend"	English, Italian	Jacques Houdek; Arjana Kunštek; Fabrizio Laucella; Tony Malm; Ines Prajo; Siniša Reljić	13 (8 †)
1468	12 **	17	Norway	56	Jowst (Note: Performance contains uncredited live vocals from Aleksander Walmann)	"Grab the Moment"	English	Jonas McDonnell; Joakim With Steen	10 (5 †)
1469	13 **	—N/a	Switzerland	58	Timebelle	"Apollo"	English	Alessandra Günthardt; Nicolas Günthardt; Elias Näslin	DNQ (12)
1470	14 **	3	Belarus	14	Naviband	"Story of My Life"	Belarusian	Arciom Lukjanienka	17 (9 †)
1471	15 **	25	Bulgaria	11	Kristian Kostov	"Beautiful Mess"	English	Johan Alkenäs; Sebastian Arman; Alexander V. Blay; Borislav Milanov; Joacim Persson	2 (1 †)
1472	16 **	—N/a	Lithuania	18	Fusedmarc	"Rain of Revolution"	English	Viktorija Ivanovskaja; Michail Levin; Denis Zujev	DNQ (17)
1473	17 **	—N/a	Estonia	23	Koit Toome and Laura	"Verona"	English	Sven Lõhmus	DNQ (14)
1474	18 **	1	Israel	40	Imri	"I Feel Alive"	English	Penn Hazut; Dolev Ram	23 (3 †)
1475	—N/a	9	Italy	43	Francesco Gabbani	"Occidentali's Karma"	Italian	Luca Chiaravalli; Filippo Gabbani; Francesco Gabbani; Fabio Ilacqua	6
1476	—N/a	16	Spain	57	Manel Navarro	"Do It for Your Lover"	Spanish, English	Manel Navarro; Antonio "Rayito" Rayo	26 ◁
1477	—N/a	18	United Kingdom	60	Lucie Jones	"Never Give Up on You"	English	Emmelie de Forest; Lawrie Martin; Daniel Salcedo	15
1478	—N/a	21	Germany	61	Levina	"Perfect Life"	English	Dave Bassett; Lindsey Ray; Lindy Robbins	25
1479	—N/a	22	Ukraine	14	O.Torvald	"Time"	English	Zhenia Galych; Yevhen Kamenchuk; Denys Myzyuk	24
1480	—N/a	26	France	60	Alma	"Requiem"	French, English	Nazim Khaled; Alexandra Maquet	12

Eurovision Song Contest 2018
#	R/O SF	R/O F	Country	#	Artist	Song	Language	Songwriter(s)	Placing
1481	1 *	—N/a	Azerbaijan	11	Aisel	"X My Heart"	English	Sandra Bjurman; Dimitris Kontopoulos	DNQ (11)
1482	2 *	—N/a	Iceland	31	Ari Ólafsson	"Our Choice"	English	Þórunn Clausen	DNQ (19 ◁)
1483	3 *	12	Albania	15	Eugent Bushpepa	"Mall"	Albanian	Eugent Bushpepa	11 (8 †)
1484	4 *	—N/a	Belgium	60	Sennek	"A Matter of Time"	English	Alex Callier; Laura Groeseneken; Maxime Tribeche	DNQ (12)
1485	5 *	14	Czech Republic	7	Mikolas Josef	"Lie to Me"	English	Mikolas Josef	6 (3 †)
1486	6 *	4	Lithuania	19	Ieva Zasimauskaitė	"When We're Old"	English	Vytautas Bikus	12 (9 †)
1487	7 *	22	Israel	41	Netta	"Toy"	English	Stav Beger; Doron Medalie	1 (1 †)
1488	8 *	—N/a	Belarus	15	Alekseev	"Forever"	English	Yevgeny Matyushenko; Kirill Pavlov	DNQ (16)
1489	9 *	6	Estonia	24	Elina Nechayeva	"La forza"	Italian	Ksenia Kuchukova; Mihkel Mattisen; Elina Nechayeva; Timo Vendt	8 (5 †)
1490	10 *	18	Bulgaria	12	Equinox	"Bones"	English	Brandon Treyshun Campbell; Dag Lundberg; Borislav Milanov; Joacim Persson	14 (7 †)
1491	11 *	—N/a	Macedonia	18	Eye Cue	"Lost and Found"	English	Darko Dimitrov; Bojan Trajkovski	DNQ (18)
1492	12 *	—N/a	Croatia	24	Franka	"Crazy"	English	Franka Batelić; Branimir Mihaljević	DNQ (17)
1493	13 *	5	Austria	51	Cesár Sampson	"Nobody but You"	English	Johan Alkenäs; Sebastian Arman; Borislav Milanov; Joacim Persson; Cesár Sampson	3 (4 †)
1494	14 *	—N/a	Greece	39	Yianna Terzi	"Oniro mou" (Όνειρό μου)	Greek	Aris Kalimeris; Michalis Papathanasiou; Dimitris Stamatiou; Yianna Terzi	DNQ (14)
1495	15 *	17	Finland	52	Saara Aalto	"Monsters"	English	Saara Aalto; Joy Deb; Linnea Deb; Ki Fitzgerald	25 (10 †)
1496	16 *	—N/a	Armenia	12	Sevak Khanagyan	"Qami" (Քամի)	Armenian	Anna Danielyan; Sevak Khanagyan; Victoria Maloyan	DNQ (15)
1497	17 *	—N/a	Switzerland	59	Zibbz	"Stones"	English	Laurell Barker; Herman Gardarfve; Corinne Gfeller; Stefan Gfeller	DNQ (13)
1498	18 *	24	Ireland	52	Ryan O'Shaughnessy	"Together"	English	Mark Caplice; Laura Elizabeth Hughes; Ryan O'Shaughnessy	16 (6 †)
1499	19 *	25	Cyprus	35	Eleni Foureira	"Fuego"	English	Didrick; Alex Papaconstantinou; Geraldo Sandell; Viktor Svensson; Anderz Wrethov	2 (2 †)
1500	1 **	7	Norway	57	Alexander Rybak	"That's How You Write a Song"	English	Alexander Rybak	15 (1 †)
1501	2 **	—N/a	Romania	19	The Humans	"Goodbye"	English	Cristina Caramarcu; Alexandru Matei; Alin Neagoe	DNQ (11)
1502	3 **	10	Serbia	11	Sanja Ilić and Balkanika	"Nova deca" (Нова деца)	Serbian	Aleksandar Ilić; Tatjana Karajanov Ilić; Danica Krstajić	19 (9 †)
1503	4 **	—N/a	San Marino	9	Jessika feat. Jenifer Brening	"Who We Are"	English	Jenifer Brening; Stefan Moessle; Mathias Strasser; Christof Straub; Zoë Straub	DNQ (17)
1504	5 **	15	Denmark	47	Rasmussen	"Higher Ground"	English	Niclas Arn; Karl Eurén	9 (5 †)
1505	6 **	—N/a	Russia	21	Julia Samoylova	"I Won't Break"	English	Arie Burshtein; Leonid Gutkin; Netta Nimrodi	DNQ (15)
1506	7 **	19	Moldova	14	DoReDoS	"My Lucky Day"	English	John Ballard; Philipp Kirkorov	10 (3 †)
1507	8 **	23	Netherlands	59	Waylon	"Outlaw in 'Em"	English	Jim Beavers; Ilya Toshinskiy; Waylon	18 (7 †)
1508	9 **	16	Australia	4	Jessica Mauboy	"We Got Love"	English	Anthony Egizii; Jessica Mauboy; David Musumeci	20 (4 †)
1509	10 **	—N/a	Georgia	11	Ethno-Jazz Band Iriao	"For You"	Georgian	David Malazonia; Mikheil Mdinaradze; Irina Sanikidze	DNQ (18 ◁)
1510	11 **	—N/a	Poland	21	Gromee feat. Lukas Meijer	"Light Me Up"	English	Andrzej Gromala; Lukas Meijer; Mahan Moin; Christian Rabb	DNQ (14)
1511	12 **	—N/a	Malta	31	Christabelle	"Taboo"	English	Christabelle; Thomas G:son; Muxu; Johnny Sanchez	DNQ (13)
1512	13 **	21	Hungary	16	AWS	"Viszlát nyár"	Hungarian	Bence Brucker; Dániel Kökényes; Soma Schiszler; Örs Siklósi; Áron Veress	21 (10 †)
1513	14 **	—N/a	Latvia	19	Laura Rizzotto	"Funny Girl"	English	Laura Rizzotto	DNQ (12)
1514	15 **	20	Sweden	58	Benjamin Ingrosso	"Dance You Off"	English	Benjamin Ingrosso; MAG; K Nita; Louis Schoorl	7 (2 †)
1515	16 **	—N/a	Montenegro	10	Vanja Radovanović	"Inje" (Иње)	Montenegrin	Vladimir Radovanović	DNQ (16)
1516	17 **	3	Slovenia	24	Lea Sirk	"Hvala, ne!"	Slovene	Tomy DeClerque; Lea Sirk	22 (8 †)
1517	18 **	1	Ukraine	15	Mélovin	"Under the Ladder"	English	Mélovin; Mike Ryals	17 (6 †)
1518	—N/a	2	Spain	58	Amaia and Alfred	"Tu canción"	Spanish	Raúl Gómez García; Sylvia Ruth Santoro López	23
1519	—N/a	8	Portugal	50	Cláudia Pascoal (Note: Performance contains uncredited live vocals from Isaura)	"O jardim"	Portuguese	Isaura	26 ◁
1520	—N/a	9	United Kingdom	61	SuRie	"Storm"	English	Nicole Blair; Sean Hargreaves; Gil Lewis	24
1521	—N/a	11	Germany	62	Michael Schulte	"You Let Me Walk Alone"	English	Nisse Ingwersen; Katharina Müller; Michael Schulte; Thomas Stengaard	4
1522	—N/a	13	France	61	Madame Monsieur	"Mercy"	French	Jean-Karl Lucas; Émilie Satt	13
1523	—N/a	26	Italy	44	Ermal Meta and Fabrizio Moro	"Non mi avete fatto niente"	Italian	Andrea Febo; Ermal Meta; Fabrizio Moro	5

Eurovision Song Contest 2019
#	R/O SF	R/O F	Country	#	Artist	Song	Language	Songwriter(s)	Placing
1524	1 *	11	Cyprus	36	Tamta	"Replay"	English	Kristoffer Fogelmark; Albin Nedler; Alex Papaconstantinou; Teddy Sky; Viktor Svensson	13 (9 †)
1525	2 *	—N/a	Montenegro	11	D mol	"Heaven"	English	Dejan Božović; Adis Eminić	DNQ (16)
1526	3 *	—N/a	Finland	53	Darude feat. Sebastian Rejman	"Look Away"	English	Sebastian Rejman; Ville Virtanen	DNQ (17 ◁)
1527	4 *	—N/a	Poland	22	Tulia	"Fire of Love (Pali się)"	Polish, English	Nadia Dalin; Jude Friedman; Sonia Krasny; Allan Rich	DNQ (11)
1528	5 *	10	Slovenia	25	Zala Kralj and Gašper Šantl	"Sebi"	Slovene	Zala Kralj; Gašper Šantl	15 (6 †)
1529	6 *	3	Czech Republic	8	Lake Malawi	"Friend of a Friend"	English	Albert Černý; Jan Steinsdoerfer; Maciej Mikołaj Trybulec	11 (2 †)
1530	7 *	—N/a	Hungary	17	Joci Pápai	"Az én apám"	Hungarian	Ferenc Molnár; Joci Pápai	DNQ (12)
1531	8 *	19	Belarus	16	Zena	"Like It"	English	Viktor Drobysh; Yuliya Kireyeva	24 (10 †)
1532	9 *	23	Serbia	12	Nevena Božović	"Kruna" (Круна)	Serbian	Nevena Božović; Darko Dimitrov	18 (7 †)
1533	10 *	—N/a	Belgium	61	Eliot	"Wake Up"	English	Pierre Dumoulin; Eliot Vassamillet	DNQ (13)
1534	11 *	—N/a	Georgia	12	Oto Nemsadze	"Keep On Going"	Georgian	Diana Giorgadze; Roma Giorgadze	DNQ (14)
1535	12 *	25	Australia	5	Kate Miller-Heidke	"Zero Gravity"	English	Julian Hamilton; Kate Miller-Heidke; Keir Nuttall	9 (1 †)
1536	13 *	17	Iceland	32	Hatari	"Hatrið mun sigra"	Icelandic	Hatari	10 (3 †)
1537	14 *	18	Estonia	25	Victor Crone	"Storm"	English	Victor Crone; Vallo Kikas; Fred Krieger; Sebastian Lestapier; Stig Rästa	20 (4 †)
1538	15 *	—N/a	Portugal	51	Conan Osíris	"Telemóveis"	Portuguese	Conan Osíris	DNQ (15)
1539	16 *	13	Greece	40	Katerine Duska	"Better Love"	English	Phil Cook; Katerine Duska; Leon of Athens; David Sneddon	21 (5 †)
1540	17 *	7	San Marino	10	Serhat	"Say Na Na Na"	English	Mary Susan Applegate; Serhat	19 (8 †)
1541	1 **	—N/a	Armenia	13	Srbuk	"Walking Out"	English	Lost Capital; Garik Papoyan; Tokionine	DNQ (16)
1542	2 **	—N/a	Ireland	53	Sarah McTernan	"22"	English	Janieck van de Polder; Roel Rats; Marcia Sondeijker	DNQ (18 ◁)
1543	3 **	—N/a	Moldova	15	Anna Odobescu	"Stay"	English	Maria Broberg; Georgios Kalpakidis; Jeppe Reil; Thomas Reil	DNQ (12)
1544	4 **	24	Switzerland	60	Luca Hänni	"She Got Me"	English	Laurell Barker; Jon Hällgren; Lukas Hällgren; Luca Hänni; Frazer Mac	4 (4 †)
1545	5 **	—N/a	Latvia	20	Carousel	"That Night"	English	Mārcis Vasiļevskis; Sabīne Žuga	DNQ (15)
1546	6 **	—N/a	Romania	20	Ester Peony	"On a Sunday"	English	Ioana Victoria Badea; Ester Alexandra Creţu; Alexandru Şerbu	DNQ (13)
1547	7 **	6	Denmark	48	Leonora	"Love Is Forever"	English	Lise Cabble; Emil Lei; Melanie Wehbe	12 (10 †)
1548	8 **	9	Sweden	59	John Lundvik	"Too Late for Love"	English	John Lundvik; Andreas Stone Johansson; Anderz Wrethov	5 (3 †)
1549	9 **	—N/a	Austria	52	Paenda	"Limits"	English	Paenda	DNQ (17)
1550	10 **	—N/a	Croatia	25	Roko	"The Dream"	English, Croatian	Andrea Čubrić; Jacques Houdek; Charlie Mason	DNQ (14)
1551	11 **	1	Malta	32	Michela	"Chameleon"	English	Johan Alkenäs; Borislav Milanov; Joacim Persson; Paula Winger	14 (8 †)
1552	12 **	—N/a	Lithuania	20	Jurij Veklenko	"Run with the Lions"	English	Ashley Hicklin; Pele Loriano; Eric Lumiere	DNQ (11)
1553	13 **	5	Russia	22	Sergey Lazarev	"Scream"	English	Dimitris Kontopoulos; Sharon Vaughn	3 (6 †)
1554	14 **	2	Albania	16	Jonida Maliqi	"Ktheju tokës"	Albanian	Eriona Rushiti	17 (9 †)
1555	15 **	15	Norway	58	Keiino	"Spirit in the Sky"	English	Fred Buljo; Tom Hugo; Alexander Olsson; Alexandra Rotan; Rüdiger Schramm; Henrik Tala	6 (7 †)
1556	16 **	12	Netherlands	60	Duncan Laurence	"Arcade"	English	Wouter Hardy; Will Knox; Duncan Laurence; Joel Sjöö	1 (1 †)
1557	17 **	8	North Macedonia	19	Tamara Todevska	"Proud"	English	Robert Bilbilov; Lazar Cvetkoski; Darko Dimitrov; Kosta Petrov; Sanja Popovska	7 (2 †)
1558	18 **	20	Azerbaijan	12	Chingiz	"Truth"	English	Bo J; Trey Campbell; Chingiz; Pablo Dinero; Hostess; Borislav Milanov	8 (5 †)
1559	—N/a	4	Germany	63	S!sters	"Sister"	English	Laurell Barker; Marine Kaltenbacher; Tom Oehler; Thomas Stengaard	25
1560	—N/a	14	Israel	42	Kobi Marimi	"Home"	English	Ohad Shragai; Inbar Wizman	23
1561	—N/a	16	United Kingdom	62	Michael Rice	"Bigger than Us"	English	Laurell Barker; Anna-Klara Folin; John Lundvik; Jonas Thander	26 ◁
1562	—N/a	21	France	62	Bilal Hassani	"Roi"	French, English	Bilal Hassani; Madame Monsieur	16
1563	—N/a	22	Italy	45	Mahmood	"Soldi"	Italian	Charlie Charles; Dardust; Mahmood	2
1564	—N/a	26	Spain	59	Miki	"La venda"	Spanish	Adrià Salas	22

=== 2020s ===
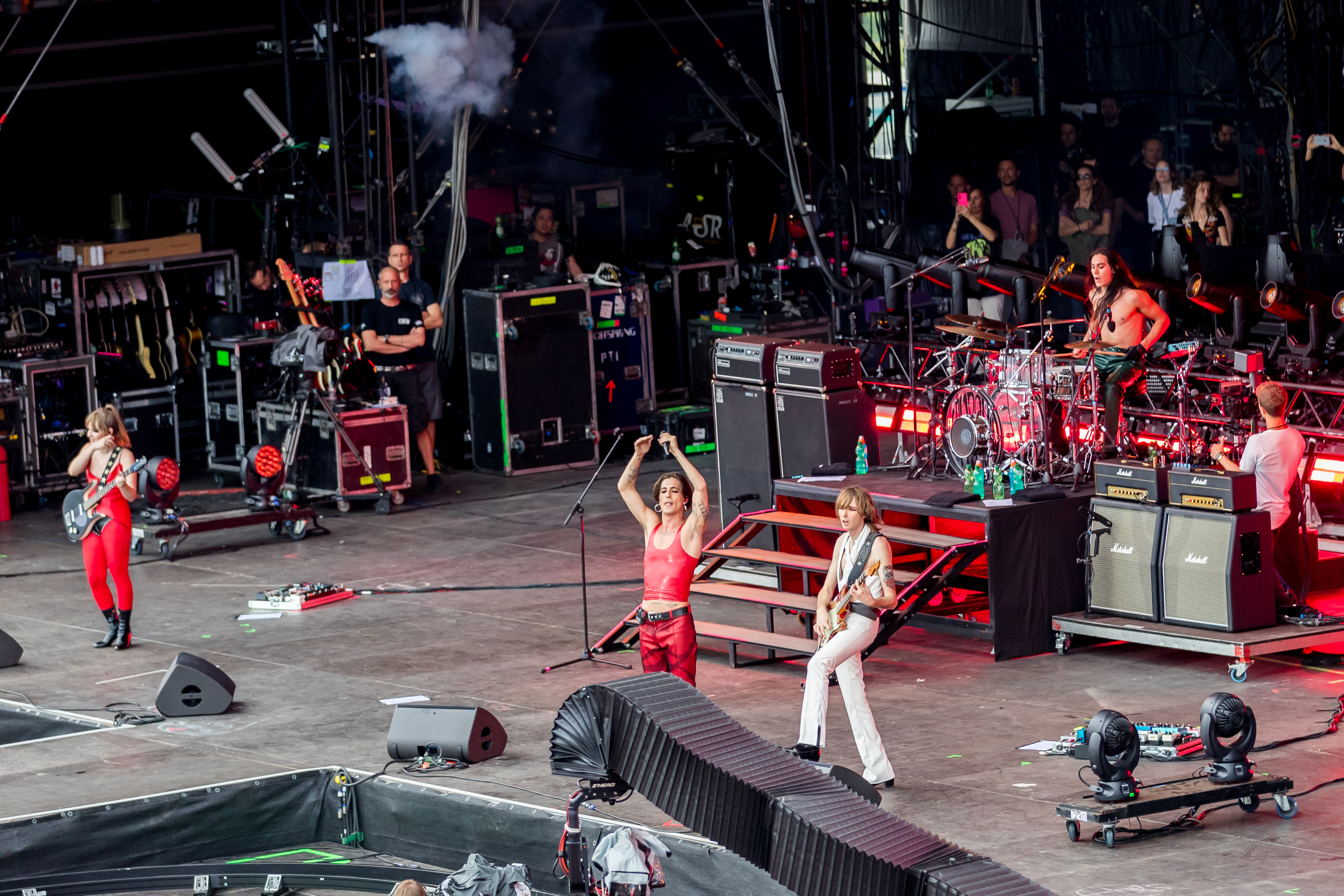
Måneskin brought Italy its third win in 2021, and the band's win also marked their international breakthrough.

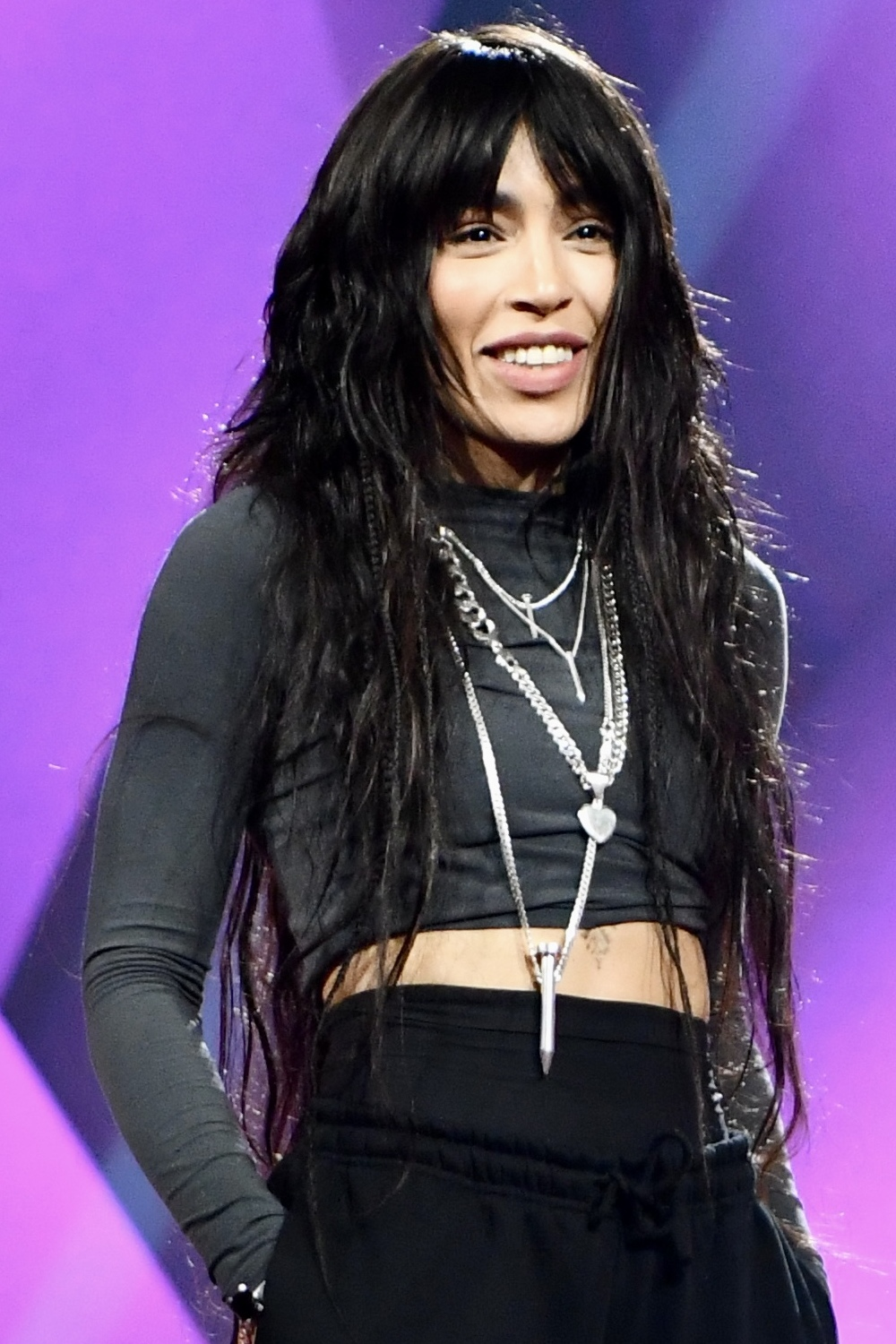
Loreen's win at the 2023 contest brought Sweden its seventh win, tying it with Ireland as the country with the most wins. She is also the second person to win more than once in the contest's history, having also won the 2012 edition.

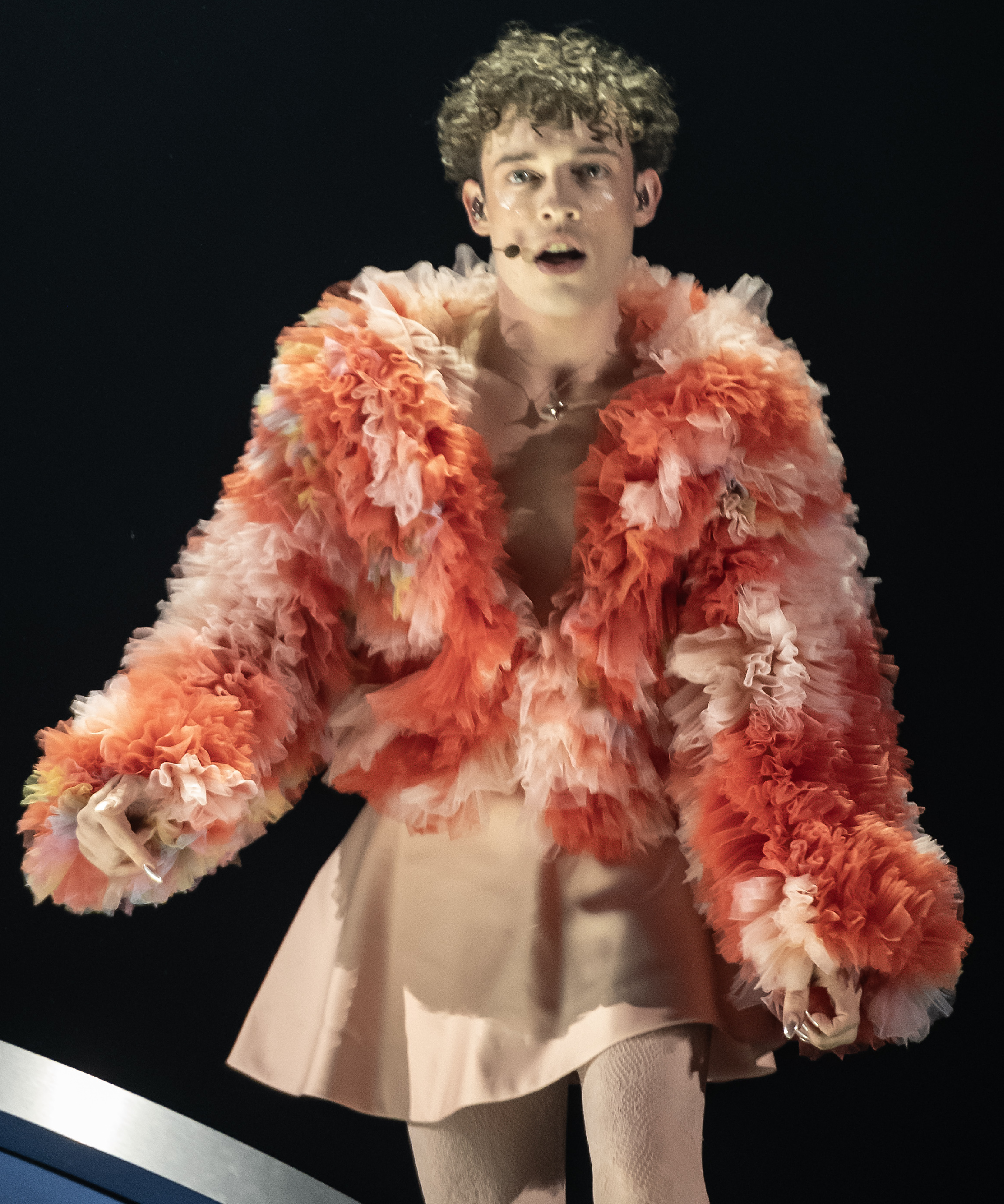
2024 winner Nemo was the third artist to win the contest for Switzerland, and is also the contest's first openly non-binary winner.

Eurovision Song Contest 2021
#	R/O SF	R/O F	Country	#	Artist	Song	Language	Songwriter(s)	Placing
1565	1 *	18	Lithuania	21	The Roop	"Discoteque"	English	Mantas Banišauskas; Robertas Baranauskas; Laisvūnas Černovas; Kalle Lindroth; Vaidotas Valiukevičius; Ilkka Wirtanen	8 (4 †)
1566	2 *	—N/a	Slovenia	26	Ana Soklič	"Amen"	English	Charlie Mason; Žiga Pirnat; Bojan Simončič; Ana Soklič	DNQ (13)
1567	3 *	5	Russia	23	Manizha	"Russian Woman"	Russian, English	Ori Avni; Ori Kaplan; Manizha Sanghin	9 (3 †)
1568	4 *	25	Sweden	60	Tusse	"Voices"	English	Joy Deb; Linnea Deb; Jimmy "Joker" Thörnfeldt; Anderz Wrethov	14 (7 †)
1569	5 *	—N/a	Australia	6	Montaigne	"Technicolour"	English	Jess Cerro; Dave Hammer	DNQ (14)
1570	6 *	—N/a	North Macedonia	20	Vasil	"Here I Stand"	English	Vasil Garvanliev; Davor Jordanovski; Borče Kuzmanovski	DNQ (15)
1571	7 *	—N/a	Ireland	54	Lesley Roy	"Maps"	English	Emelie Eriksson; Lukas Hällgren; Lesley Roy; Philip Strand	DNQ (16 ◁)
1572	8 *	1	Cyprus	37	Elena Tsagrinou	"El Diablo"	English	Laurell Barker; Oxa; Thomas Stengaard; Jimmy "Joker" Thornfeldt	16 (6 †)
1573	9 *	22	Norway	59	Tix	"Fallen Angel"	English	Andreas Haukeland; Mathias Haukeland; Emelie Hollow	18 (10 †)
1574	10 *	—N/a	Croatia	26	Albina	"Tick-Tock"	English, Croatian	Tihana Buklijaš Bakić; Max Cinnamon; Branimir Mihaljević	DNQ (11)
1575	11 *	4	Belgium	62	Hooverphonic	"The Wrong Place"	English	Alex Callier; Charlotte Forêt	19 (9 †)
1576	12 *	3	Israel	43	Eden Alene	"Set Me Free"	English	Ron Carmi; Amit Mordechai; Ido Netzer; Noam Zlatin	17 (5 †)
1577	13 *	—N/a	Romania	21	Roxen	"Amnesia"	English	Adelina Stîngă; Viky Red	DNQ (12)
1578	14 *	21	Azerbaijan	13	Efendi	"Mata Hari"	English	Luuk van Beers; Tony Cornelissen; Josh Earl; Amy van der Wel	20 (8 †)
1579	15 *	19	Ukraine	16	Go_A	"Shum" (Шум)	Ukrainian	Kateryna Pavlenko; Taras Shevchenko	5 (2 †)
1580	16 *	6	Malta	33	Destiny	"Je me casse"	English	Pete Barringer; Malin Christin; Amanuel Dermont; Nicklas Eklund	7 (1 †)
1581	1 **	26	San Marino	11	Senhit (Note: Performance contains uncredited live vocals from Flo Rida.)	"Adrenalina"	English	Joy Deb; Linnea Deb; Tramar Dillard; Suzi Pancenkov; Malou Linn Eloise Ruotsalainen; Kenny Silverdique; Thomas Stengaard; Jimmy "Joker" Thornfeldt; Chanel Tukia; Senhit Zadik Zadik	22 (9 †)
1582	2 **	—N/a	Estonia	26	Uku Suviste	"The Lucky One"	English	Uku Suviste; Sharon Vaughn	DNQ (13)
1583	3 **	—N/a	Czech Republic	9	Benny Cristo	"Omaga"	English	Benny Cristo; Filip Vlček	DNQ (15)
1584	4 **	10	Greece	41	Stefania	"Last Dance"	English	Arcade; Dimitris Kontopoulos; Sharon Vaughn	10 (6 †)
1585	5 **	—N/a	Austria	53	Vincent Bueno	"Amen"	English	Tobias Carshey; Ashley Hicklin; Jonas Thander	DNQ (12)
1586	6 **	—N/a	Poland	23	Rafał	"The Ride"	English	Thomas Karlsson; Johan Mauritzson; Joakim Övrenius; Clara Rubensson	DNQ (14)
1587	7 **	14	Moldova	16	Natalia Gordienko	"Sugar"	English	Mikhail Gutseriev; Philipp Kirkorov; Dimitris Kontopoulos; Sharon Vaughn	13 (7 †)
1588	8 **	12	Iceland	33	Daði og Gagnamagnið	"10 Years"	English	Daði Freyr Pétursson	4 (2 †)
1589	9 **	8	Serbia	13	Hurricane	"Loco loco"	Serbian	Nemanja Antonić; Darko Dimitrov; Sanja Vučić	15 (8 †)
1590	10 **	—N/a	Georgia	13	Tornike Kipiani	"You"	English	Tornike Kipiani	DNQ (16)
1591	11 **	2	Albania	17	Anxhela Peristeri	"Karma"	Albanian	Kledi Bahiti; Olti Curri	21 (10 †)
1592	12 **	7	Portugal	52	The Black Mamba	"Love Is on My Side"	English	Tatanka	12 (4 †)
1593	13 **	17	Bulgaria	13	Victoria	"Growing Up Is Getting Old"	English	Oliver Björkvall; Victoria Georgieva; Helena Larsson; Maya Nalani	11 (3 †)
1594	14 **	16	Finland	54	Blind Channel	"Dark Side"	English	Joel Hokka; Aleksi Kaunisvesi; Olli Matela; Niko Moilanen; Joonas Porko	6 (5 †)
1595	15 **	—N/a	Latvia	21	Samanta Tīna	"The Moon Is Rising"	English	Aminata Savadogo; Samanta Tīna; Oskars Uhaņs	DNQ (17 ◁)
1596	16 **	11	Switzerland	61	Gjon's Tears	"Tout l'univers"	French	Wouter Hardy; Xavier Michel; Gjon Muharremaj; Nina Sampermans	3 (1 †)
1597	17 **	—N/a	Denmark	49	Fyr og Flamme	"Øve os på hinanden"	Danish	Laurits Emanuel	DNQ (11)
1598	—N/a	9	United Kingdom	63	James Newman	"Embers"	English	Conor Blake; Samuel Brennan; Tom Hollings; James Newman; Danny Shah	26 ◁
1599	—N/a	13	Spain	60	Blas Cantó	"Voy a quedarme"	Spanish	Blas Cantó; Dan Hammond; Dangelo Ortega; Leroy Sánchez	24
1600	—N/a	15	Germany	64	Jendrik	"I Don't Feel Hate"	English	Christoph Oswald; Jendrik Sigwart	25
1601	—N/a	20	France	63	Barbara Pravi	"Voilà"	French	Igit; Lili Poe; Barbara Pravi	2
1602	—N/a	23	Netherlands	61	Jeangu Macrooy	"Birth of a New Age"	English, Sranan Tongo	Jeangu Macrooy; Pieter Perquin	23
1603	—N/a	24	Italy	46	Måneskin	"Zitti e buoni"	Italian	Damiano David; Victoria De Angelis; Thomas Raggi; Ethan Torchio	1

Eurovision Song Contest 2022
#	R/O SF	R/O F	Country	#	Artist	Song	Language	Songwriter(s)	Placing
1604	1 *	—N/a	Albania	18	Ronela Hajati	"Sekret"	Albanian, English	Ronela Hajati	DNQ (12)
1605	2 *	—N/a	Latvia	22	Citi Zēni	"Eat Your Salad"	English	Jānis "JJ Lush" Jačmenkins; Roberts Memmēns; Jānis Pētersons; Dagnis Roziņš	DNQ (14)
1606	3 *	14	Lithuania	22	Monika Liu	"Sentimentai"	Lithuanian	Monika Liu	14 (7 †)
1607	4 *	5	Switzerland	62	Marius Bear	"Boys Do Cry"	English	Marius Bear; Martin Gallop	17 (9 †)
1608	5 *	—N/a	Slovenia	27	LPS	"Disko"	Slovene	Gašper Hlupič; Mark Semeja; Zala Velenšek; Filip Vidušin; Žiga Žvižej	DNQ (17 ◁)
1609	6 *	12	Ukraine	17	Kalush Orchestra	"Stefania" (Стефанія)	Ukrainian	Ihor Didenchuk; Vitalii Duzhyk; Ivan Klymenko; Tymofii Muzychuk; Oleh Psiuk	1 (1 †)
1610	7 *	—N/a	Bulgaria	14	Intelligent Music Project	"Intention"	English	MD; Milen Vrabevski	DNQ (16)
1611	8 *	11	Netherlands	62	S10	"De diepte"	Dutch	Stien den Hollander; Arno Krabman	11 (2 †)
1612	9 *	19	Moldova	17	Zdob și Zdub and Advahov Brothers	"Trenulețul"	Romanian	Vasile Advahov; Vitalie Advahov; Andrei Cebotari; Mihai Gîncu; Roman Iagupov; Sveatoslav Staruș	7 (8 †)
1613	10 *	3	Portugal	53	Maro	"Saudade, saudade"	English, Portuguese	John Blanda; Maro	9 (4 †)
1614	11 *	—N/a	Croatia	27	Mia Dimšić	"Guilty Pleasure"	English, Croatian	Damir Bačić; Mia Dimšić; Vjekoslav Dimter	DNQ (11)
1615	12 *	—N/a	Denmark	50	Reddi	"The Show"	English	Chief 1; Julia Fabrin; Remee Jackman; Ihan Haydar; Siggy Savery	DNQ (13)
1616	13 *	—N/a	Austria	54	Lumix feat. Pia Maria	"Halo"	English	Rasmus Flyckt; Luca Michlmayr; Anders Nilsen; Gabry Ponte; Sophie Alexandra Tweed-Simmons	DNQ (15)
1617	14 *	18	Iceland	34	Systur	"Með hækkandi sól"	Icelandic	Lovísa Elísabet Sigrúnardóttir	23 (10 †)
1618	15 *	17	Greece	42	Amanda Georgiadi Tenfjord	"Die Together"	English	Amanda Georgiadi Tenfjord; Bjørn Helge Gammelsæter	8 (3 †)
1619	16 *	7	Norway	60	Subwoolfer	"Give That Wolf a Banana"	English	DJ Astronaut; Jim; Keith	10 (6 †)
1620	17 *	8	Armenia	14	Rosa Linn	"Snap"	English	Allie Crystal; Jeremy Dusolet; Courtney Harrell; Tamar Mardirossian Kaprelian; Larzz Principato; Rosa Linn	20 (5 †)
1621	1 **	4	Finland	55	The Rasmus	"Jezebel"	English	Desmond Child; Lauri Ylönen	21 (7 †)
1622	2 **	—N/a	Israel	44	Michael Ben David	"I.M"	English	Chen Aharoni; Lidor Saadia; Asi Tal	DNQ (13)
1623	3 **	24	Serbia	14	Konstrakta	"In corpore sano"	Serbian, Latin	Milovan Bošković; Ana Đurić	5 (3 †)
1624	4 **	15	Azerbaijan	14	Nadir Rustamli	"Fade to Black"	English	Sebastian Schub; Thomas Stengaard; Andreas Stone; Anderz Wrethov	16 (10 †)
1625	5 **	—N/a	Georgia	14	Circus Mircus	"Lock Me In"	English	Circus Mircus	DNQ (18 ◁)
1626	6 **	—N/a	Malta	34	Emma Muscat	"I Am What I Am"	English	Julie Aagaard; Stine Kinck; Dino Medanhodžić; Emma Muscat	DNQ (16)
1627	7 **	—N/a	San Marino	12	Achille Lauro	"Stripper"	Italian, English	Gregorio "Greg" Calculli; Matteo "Gow Tribe" Ciceroni; Mattia "Banf" Cutolo; Federico De Marinis; Lauro De Marinis; Daniele Dezi; Marco "Lancs" Lanciotti; Simon Pietro Manzari; Daniele Mungai; Davide Petrella; Francesco Viscovo	DNQ (14)
1628	8 **	21	Australia	7	Sheldon Riley	"Not the Same"	English	Cam Nacson; Sheldon Riley Hernandez	15 (2 †)
1629	9 **	—N/a	Cyprus	38	Andromache	"Ela" (Έλα)	English, Greek	Arash; Yll Limani; Fatjon Miftaraj; Eyelar Mirzazadeh; Alex Papaconstantinou; George Papadopoulos; Filloreta Raçi Fifi; Viktor Svensson; Robert Uhlmann	DNQ (12)
1630	10 **	—N/a	Ireland	55	Brooke	"That's Rich"	English	Brooke Scullion; Izzy Warner; Karl Zine	DNQ (15)
1631	11 **	—N/a	North Macedonia	21	Andrea	"Circles"	English	Andrea Koevska; Aleksandar Masevski	DNQ (11)
1632	12 **	25	Estonia	27	Stefan	"Hope"	English	Stefan Airapetjan; Karl-Ander Reismann	13 (5 †)
1633	13 **	2	Romania	22	Wrs	"Llámame"	English, Spanish	Costel Dominteanu; Cezar Gună; Alexandru Turcu; Andrei Ursu	18 (9 †)
1634	14 **	23	Poland	24	Ochman	"River"	English	Ashley Hicklin; Krystian Ochman; Mikołaj Trybulec; Adam Wiśniewski	12 (6 †)
1635	15 **	—N/a	Montenegro	12	Vladana	"Breathe"	English, Italian	Darko Dimitrov; Vladana	DNQ (17)
1636	16 **	16	Belgium	63	Jérémie Makiese	"Miss You"	English	Silvio Lisbonne; Jérémie Makiese; Mike BGRZ; Manon Romiti	19 (8 †)
1637	17 **	20	Sweden	61	Cornelia Jakobs	"Hold Me Closer"	English	Cornelia Jakobs; Isa Molin; David Zandén	4 (1 †)
1638	18 **	1	Czech Republic	10	We Are Domi	"Lights Off"	English	Einar Eriksen Kvaløy; Dominika Hašková; Casper Hatlestad; Abigail Frances Jones; Benjamin Rekstad	22 (4 †)
1639	—N/a	6	France	64	Alvan and Ahez	"Fulenn"	Breton	Marine Lavigne; Alexis Morvan Rosius	24
1640	—N/a	9	Italy	47	Mahmood and Blanco	"Brividi"	Italian	Riccardo Fabbriconi; Alessandro Mahmoud; Michele "Michelangelo" Zocca	6
1641	—N/a	10	Spain	61	Chanel	"SloMo"	Spanish, English	Keith Harris; Ibere Fortes; Leroy Sánchez; Maggie Szabo; Arjen Thonen	3
1642	—N/a	13	Germany	65	Malik Harris	"Rockstars"	English	Malik Harris; Robin Karow; Marianne Kobylka	25 ◁
1643	—N/a	22	United Kingdom	64	Sam Ryder	"Space Man"	English	Sam Ryder; Amy Wadge; Max Wolfgang	2

Eurovision Song Contest 2023
#	R/O SF	R/O F	Country	#	Artist	Song	Language	Songwriter(s)	Placing
1644	1 *	20	Norway	61	Alessandra	"Queen of Kings"	English	Linda Dale; Stanley Ferdinandez; Alessandra Mele; Henning Olerud	5 (6 †)
1645	2 *	—N/a	Malta	35	The Busker	"Dance (Our Own Party)"	English	Matthew James Borg; Jean Paul Borg; Micheal Joe Cini; Sean Meachen; David Meilak	DNQ (15 ◁)
1646	3 *	5	Serbia	15	Luke Black	"Samo mi se spava" (Само ми се спава)	Serbian, English	Luke Black	24 (10 †)
1647	4 *	—N/a	Latvia	23	Sudden Lights	"Aijā"	English	Kārlis Matīss Zitmanis; Mārtiņš Matīss Zemītis; Andrejs Reinis Zitmanis; Kārlis Vārtiņš	DNQ (11)
1648	5 *	2	Portugal	54	Mimicat	"Ai coração"	Portuguese	Marisa Mena; Luís Pereira	23 (9 †)
1649	6 *	—N/a	Ireland	56	Wild Youth	"We Are One"	English	Jörgen Elofsson; Conor O'Donohoe; Edward Porter	DNQ (12)
1650	7 *	25	Croatia	28	Let 3	"Mama ŠČ!"	Croatian	Damir Martinović Mrle; Zoran Prodanović	13 (8 †)
1651	8 *	3	Switzerland	63	Remo Forrer	"Watergun"	English	Ashley Hicklin; Argyle Singh; Mikołaj Trybulec	20 (7 †)
1652	9 *	23	Israel	45	Noa Kirel	"Unicorn"	English	Noa Kirel; Doron Medalie; May Sfadia; Yinon Yahel	3 (3 †)
1653	10 *	18	Moldova	18	Pasha Parfeni	"Soarele și luna"	Romanian	Pasha Parfeni; Yuliana Parfeni; Cătălin Temciuc; Andrei Vulpe	18 (5 †)
1654	11 *	9	Sweden	62	Loreen	"Tattoo"	English	Peter Boström; Moa "Cazzi Opeia" Carlebecker; Thomas G:son; Jimmy Jansson; Loreen; Jimmy "Joker" Thörnfeldt	1 (2 †)
1655	12 *	—N/a	Azerbaijan	15	TuralTuranX	"Tell Me More"	English	Nihad Aliyev; Tural Baghmanov; Turan Baghmanov; Tunar Taghiyev	DNQ (14)
1656	13 *	14	Czechia	11	Vesna	"My Sister's Crown"	English, Ukrainian, Czech, Bulgarian	Adam Albrecht; Michal Jiráň; Patricie Kaňok; Šimon Martínek; Kateryna Vatchenko; Tanita Yankova	10 (4 †)
1657	14 *	—N/a	Netherlands	63	Mia Nicolai and Dion Cooper	"Burning Daylight"	English	Dion Cuiper; Jordan Garfield; Loek van der Grinten; Duncan de Moor; Mia Nicolai	DNQ (13)
1658	15 *	13	Finland	56	Käärijä	"Cha Cha Cha"	Finnish	Johannes Naukkarinen; Aleksi Nurmi; Jere Pöyhönen	2 (1 †)
1659	1 **	—N/a	Denmark	51	Reiley	"Breaking My Heart"	English	Bård Bonsaksen; Sivert Hjeltnes Hagtvet; Rani Petersen; Hilda Stenmalm	DNQ (14)
1660	2 **	17	Armenia	15	Brunette	"Future Lover"	English, Armenian	Brunette	14 (6 †)
1661	3 **	—N/a	Romania	23	Theodor Andrei	"D.G.T. (Off and On)"	Romanian, English	Theodor-Octavian Andrei; Luca De Mezzo; Mikail Jahed; Luca Ştefan Udăţeanu	DNQ (15)
1662	4 **	12	Estonia	28	Alika	"Bridges"	English	Wouter Hardy; Alika Milova; Nina Sampermans	8 (10 †)
1663	5 **	16	Belgium	64	Gustaph	"Because of You"	English	Jaouad Alloul; Gustaph	7 (8 †)
1664	6 **	7	Cyprus	39	Andrew Lambrou	"Break a Broken Heart"	English	Jimmy Jansson; Thomas Stengaard; Jimmy "Joker" Thörnfeldt; Marcus Winther-John	12 (7 †)
1665	7 **	—N/a	Iceland	35	Diljá	"Power"	English	Diljá Pétursdóttir; Pálmi Ragnar Ásgeirsson	DNQ (11)
1666	8 **	—N/a	Greece	43	Victor Vernicos	"What They Say"	English	Victor Vernicos Jørgensen	DNQ (13)
1667	9 **	4	Poland	25	Blanka	"Solo"	English	Maria Broberg; Marcin Górecki; Maciej Puchalski; Bartłomiej Rzeczycki; Blanka Stajkow; Julia Sundberg; Mikołaj Trybulec	19 (3 †)
1668	10 **	24	Slovenia	28	Joker Out	"Carpe Diem"	Slovene	Bojan Cvjetićanin; Kris Guštin; Nace Jordan; Jure Maček; Jan Peteh	21 (5 †)
1669	11 **	—N/a	Georgia	15	Iru	"Echo"	English	Beni Kadagidze; Iru Khechanovi; Giorgi Kukhianidze	DNQ (12)
1670	12 **	—N/a	San Marino	13	Piqued Jacks	"Like an Animal"	English	Francesco Bini; Andrea Lazzeretti; Tommaso Oliveri; Marco Sgaramella	DNQ (16 ◁)
1671	13 **	1	Austria	55	Teya and Salena	"Who the Hell Is Edgar?"	English	Selina-Maria Edbauer; Ronald Janeček; Pele Loriano; Teodora Špirić	15 (2 †)
1672	14 **	10	Albania	19	Albina and Familja Kelmendi	"Duje"	Albanian	Enis Mullaj; Eriona Rushiti	22 (9 †)
1673	15 **	22	Lithuania	23	Monika Linkytė	"Stay"	English	Krists Indrišonoks; Monika Linkytė	11 (4 †)
1674	16 **	15	Australia	8	Voyager	"Promise"	English	Alex Canion; Ashley Doodkorte; Simone Dow; Daniel Estrin; Scott Kay	9 (1 †)
1675	—N/a	6	France	65	La Zarra	"Évidemment"	French	Banx & Ranx; Benny Adam; La Zarra	16
1676	—N/a	8	Spain	62	Blanca Paloma	"Eaea"	Spanish	Blanca Paloma; José Pablo Polo; Álvaro Tato	17
1677	—N/a	11	Italy	48	Marco Mengoni	"Due vite"	Italian	Marco Mengoni; Davide Petrella; Davide Simonetta	4
1678	—N/a	19	Ukraine	18	Tvorchi	"Heart of Steel"	English, Ukrainian	Andrii Hutsuliak; Jimoh Augustus Kehinde	6
1679	—N/a	21	Germany	66	Lord of the Lost	"Blood & Glitter"	English	Anthony J. Brown; Chris Harms; Rupert Keplinger; Pi Stoffers	26 ◁
1680	—N/a	26	United Kingdom	65	Mae Muller	"I Wrote a Song"	English	Mae Muller; Karen Poole; Lewis Thompson	25

Eurovision Song Contest 2024
#	R/O SF	R/O F	Country	#	Artist	Song	Language	Songwriter(s)	Placing
1681	1 *	20	Cyprus	40	Silia Kapsis	"Liar"	English	Dimitris Kontopoulos; Elke Tiel	15 (6 †)
1682	2 *	16	Serbia	16	Teya Dora	"Ramonda" (Рамонда)	Serbian	Andrijano Kadović; Luka Jovanović; Teodora Pavlovska	17 (10 †)
1683	3 *	7	Lithuania	24	Silvester Belt	"Luktelk"	Lithuanian	Džesika Šyvokaitė; Elena Jurgaitytė; Silvestras Beltė	14 (4 †)
1684	4 *	10	Ireland	57	Bambie Thug	"Doomsday Blue"	English	Bambie Ray Robinson; Olivia Cassy Brooking; Sam Matlock; Tyler Ryder	6 (3 †)
1685	5 *	2	Ukraine	19	Alyona Alyona and Jerry Heil	"Teresa & Maria"	Ukrainian, English	Aliona Savranenko; Anton Chilibi; Ivan Klymenko; Yana Shemaieva	3 (2 †)
1686	6 *	—N/a	Poland	26	Luna	"The Tower"	English	Aleksandra Katarzyna Wielgomas; Max Cooke; Paul Dixon	DNQ (12)
1687	7 *	23	Croatia	29	Baby Lasagna	"Rim Tim Tagi Dim"	English	Marko Purišić	2 (1 †)
1688	8 *	—N/a	Iceland	36	Hera Björk	"Scared of Heights"	English	Ásdís María Viðarsdóttir; Ferras Alqaisi; Jaro Omar; Michael Burek	DNQ (15 ◁)
1689	9 *	22	Slovenia	29	Raiven	"Veronika"	Slovene	Bojan Cvjetićanin; Danilo Kapel; Klavdija Kopina; Martin Bezjak; Peter Khoo; Sara Briški Cirman	23 (9 †)
1690	10 *	17	Finland	57	Windows95man (Note: Features uncredited vocals by Henri Piispanen)	"No Rules!"	English	Henri Piispanen; Jussi Roine; Teemu Keisteri	19 (7 †)
1691	11 *	—N/a	Moldova	19	Natalia Barbu	"In the Middle"	English	Khris Richards; Natalia Barbu	DNQ (13)
1692	12 *	—N/a	Azerbaijan	16	Fahree feat. Ilkin Dovlatov	"Özünlə apar"	English, Azerbaijani	Edgar Ravinov; Fakhri Ismayilov; Hasan Haydar; Madina Salikh; Tamila Rzayeva	DNQ (14)
1693	13 *	—N/a	Australia	9	Electric Fields	"One Milkali (One Blood)"	English, Yankunytjatjara	Michael Ross; Zaachariaha Fielding	DNQ (11)
1694	14 *	18	Portugal	55	Iolanda	"Grito"	Portuguese	Alberto Hernández; Iolanda Costa	10 (8 †)
1695	15 *	4	Luxembourg	38	Tali	"Fighter"	French, English	Ana Zimmer; Dario Faini; Manon Romiti; Silvio Lisbonne	13 (5 †)
1696	1 **	—N/a	Malta	36	Sarah Bonnici	"Loop"	English	John Emil Johansson; Joy Deb; Kevin Lee; Linnea Deb; Leire Gotxi Angel; Matthew James Borg; Michael Joe Cini; Sarah Bonnici; Sebastian Pritchard-James	DNQ (16 ◁)
1697	2 **	—N/a	Albania	20	Besa	"Titan"	English	Besa Kokëdhima; Fabrice Grandjean; Gia Koka; Kledi Bahiti	DNQ (15)
1698	3 **	12	Greece	44	Marina Satti	"Zari" (Ζάρι)	Greek	Gino Borri; Jay Lewitt Stolar; Jordan Richard Palmer; Konstantin Plamenov Beshkov; Manolis Solidakis; Marina Satti; Nick Kodonas; Oge; Vlospa	11 (5 †)
1699	4 **	21	Switzerland	64	Nemo	"The Code"	English	Benjamin Alasu; Lasse Midtsian Nymann; Linda Dale; Nemo Mettler	1 (4 †)
1700	5 **	—N/a	Czechia	12	Aiko	"Pedestal"	English	Alena Shirmanova-Kostebelova; Steven Ansell	DNQ (11)
1701	6 **	26	Austria	56	Kaleen	"We Will Rave"	English	Anderz Wrethov; Jimmy Thörnfeldt; Julie Aagaard; Thomas Stengaard	24 (9 †)
1702	7 **	—N/a	Denmark	52	Saba	"Sand"	English	Jonas Thander; Melanie Wehbe; Pil Kalinka Nygaard Jeppesen	DNQ (12)
1703	8 **	19	Armenia	16	Ladaniva	"Jako" (Ժակո)	Armenian	Audrey Leclercq; Jaklin Baghdasaryan; Louis Thomas	8 (3 †)
1704	9 **	11	Latvia	24	Dons	"Hollow"	English	Artūrs Šingirejs; Kate Northrop; Liam Geddes	16 (7 †)
1705	10 **	—N/a	San Marino	14	Megara	"11:11"	Spanish	Isra Dante Ramos Solomando; Roberto la Lueta Ruiz; Sara Jiménez Moral	DNQ (14)
1706	11 **	24	Georgia	16	Nutsa Buzaladze	"Firefighter"	English	Ada Skitka; Darko Dimitrov	21 (8 †)
1707	12 **	—N/a	Belgium	65	Mustii	"Before the Party's Over"	English	Arianna Damato; Benoit Leclercq; Charlotte Clark; Nina Sampermans; Pierre Dumoulin; Thomas Mustin	DNQ (13)
1708	13 **	9	Estonia	29	5miinust and Puuluup	"(Nendest) narkootikumidest ei tea me (küll) midagi"	Estonian	Karl Kivastik; Kim Wennerström; Kristjan Jakobson; Marko Veisson; Mihkel Tamm; Priit Tomson; Ramo Teder	20 (6 †)
1709	14 **	6	Israel	46	Eden Golan	"Hurricane"	English, Hebrew	Avi Ohayon; Keren Peles; Stav Beger	5 (1 †)
1710	15 **	14	Norway	62	Gåte	"Ulveham"	Norwegian	Gunnhild Sundli; Magnus Børmark; Jon Even Schärer; Marit Jensen Lillebuen; Ronny Graff Janssen; Sveinung Ekloo Sundli	25 ◁ (10 †)
1711	16 **	~~5~~ ◊	Netherlands	64	Joost Klein	"Europapa"	Dutch	Donny Ellerström; Dylan van Dael; Joost Klein; Paul Elstak; Teun de Kruif; Thijmen Melissant; Tim Haars	DSQ (2 †)
1712	—N/a	1	Sweden	63	Marcus & Martinus	"Unforgettable"	English	Jimmy Thörnfeldt; Joy Deb; Linnea Deb; Marcus Gunnarsen; Martinus Gunnarsen	9
1713	—N/a	3	Germany	67	Isaak	"Always on the Run"	English	Greg Taro; Isaak Guderian; Kevin Lehr; Leo Salminen	12
1714	—N/a	8	Spain	63	Nebulossa	"Zorra"	Spanish	María Bas; Mark Dasousa	22
1715	—N/a	13	United Kingdom	66	Olly Alexander	"Dizzy"	English	Oliver Alexander Thornton; Danny L Harle	18
1716	—N/a	15	Italy	49	Angelina Mango	"La noia"	Italian	Angelina Mango; Dario Faini; Francesca Calearo	7
1717	—N/a	25	France	66	Slimane	"Mon amour"	French	Meïr Salah; Slimane Nebchi; Yaacov Salah	4

Eurovision Song Contest 2025
#	R/O SF	R/O F	Country	#	Artist	Song	Language	Songwriter(s)	Placing
1718	1 *	10	Iceland	37	Væb	"Róa"	Icelandic	Gunnar Björn Gunnarsson; Hálfdán Helgi Matthíasson; Ingi Þór Garðarsson; Matthías Davíð Matthíasson	25 (6 †)
1719	2 *	15	Poland	27	Justyna Steczkowska	"Gaja"	Polish, English	Dominic Buczkowski-Wojtaszek; Patryk Kumór; Justyna Steczkowska; Emilian Waluchowski	14 (7 †)
1720	3 *	—N/a	Slovenia	30	Klemen	"How Much Time Do We Have Left"	English	Klemen Slakonja	DNQ (13)
1721	4 *	3	Estonia	30	Tommy Cash	"Espresso Macchiato"	Italian, English	Johannes Naukkarinen; Tomas Tammemets	3 (5 †)
1722	5 *	7	Ukraine	20	Ziferblat	"Bird of Pray"	Ukrainian, English	Fedir Khodakov; Danylo Leshchynskyi; Valentyn Leshchynskyi	9 (1 †)
1723	6 *	23	Sweden	64	KAJ	"Bara bada bastu"	Swedish	Axel Åhman; Kevin Holmström; Jakob Norrgård; Robert Skowronski; Kristofer Strandberg; Anderz Wrethov	4 (4 †)
1724	7 *	21	Portugal	56	Napa	"Deslocado"	Portuguese	Diogo Góis; Guilherme Gomes; João Lourenço Gomes; João Rodrigues; André Santos; Francisco Sousa	21 (9 †)
1725	8 *	1	Norway	63	Kyle Alessandro	"Lighter"	English	Adam Allskog; Kyle Alessandro Helgesen Villalobos	18 (8 †)
1726	9 *	—N/a	Belgium	66	Red Sebastian	"Strobe Lights"	English	Billie Bentein; Seppe Herreman; Astrid Roelants; Willem Vanderstichele	DNQ (14)
1727	10 *	—N/a	Azerbaijan	17	Mamagama	"Run with U"	English	Hasan Hayadar; Sefael Mishiyev; Roman Zee	DNQ (15 ◁)
1728	11 *	25	San Marino	15	Gabry Ponte (Note: Features uncredited vocals by Andrea Bonomo and Edwyn Roberts)	"Tutta l'Italia"	Italian	Andrea Bonomo; Gabriele Ponte; Edwyn Roberts	26 ◁ (10 †)
1729	12 *	26	Albania	21	Shkodra Elektronike	"Zjerm"	Albanian	Lekë Gjeloshi; Beatriçe Gjergji; Kolë Laca	8 (2 †)
1730	13 *	12	Netherlands	65	Claude	"C'est la vie"	French, English	Claude Kiambe; Arno Krabman; Léon Paul Palmen; Joren van der Voort	12 (3 †)
1731	14 *	—N/a	Croatia	30	Marko Bošnjak	"Poison Cake"	English	Marko Bošnjak; Emma Gale; Ben Pyne; Bas Wissink	DNQ (12)
1732	15 *	—N/a	Cyprus	41	Theo Evan	"Shh"	English	Linda Dale; Dimitris Kontopoulos; Lasse Nymann; Elsa Søllesvik; Elke Tiel	DNQ (11)
1733	1 **	—N/a	Australia	10	Go-Jo	"Milkshake Man"	English	Jason Bovino; Amy Sheppard; George Sheppard; Marty Zambotto	DNQ (11)
1734	2 **	—N/a	Montenegro	13	Nina Žižić	"Dobrodošli" (Добродошли)	Montenegrin	Darko Dimitrov; Violeta Mihajlovska Milić; Boris Subotić	DNQ (16 ◁)
1735	3 **	—N/a	Ireland	58	Emmy	"Laika Party"	English	Truls Marius Aarra; Emmy Kristine Guttulsrud Kristiansen; Erlend Guttulsrud Kristiansen; Henrik Østlund; Larissa Tormey	DNQ (13)
1736	4 **	11	Latvia	25	Tautumeitas	"Bur man laimi"	Latvian	Laura Līcīte; Elvis Lintiņš; Asnate Rancāne; Aurēlija Rancāne; Gabriēla Zvaigznīte	13 (2 †)
1737	5 **	18	Armenia	17	Parg	"Survivor"	English, Armenian	Benjamin Alasu; Jon Aljidi; Peter Boström; Joshua Curran; Thomas G:son; Martin Mooradian; Armen Paul; Pargev Vardanian; Eva Voskanian; Alex Wilke	20 (10 †)
1738	6 **	9	Austria	57	JJ	"Wasted Love"	English	Johannes Pietsch; Teodora Špirić; Thomas Thurner	1 (5 †)
1739	7 **	17	Greece	45	Klavdia	"Asteromata" (Αστερομάτα)	Greek	Arcade; Klavdia Papadopoulou	6 (4 †)
1740	8 **	5	Lithuania	25	Katarsis	"Tavo akys"	Lithuanian	Lukas Radzevičius	16 (6 †)
1741	9 **	20	Malta	37	Miriana Conte	"Serving"	English	Miriana Conte; Sarah Evelyn Fullerton; Matthew Mercieca; Benjamin Schmid	17 (9 †)
1742	10 **	—N/a	Georgia	17	Mariam Shengelia	"Freedom"	Georgian, English	Keti Gabisiani; Buka Kartozia	DNQ (15)
1743	11 **	22	Denmark	53	Sissal	"Hallucination"	English	Linnea Deb; Melanie Hayrapetian; Malthe Johansen; Sissal Jóhanna Norðberg Niclasen; Chris Rohde-Frisk; Lina Spangsberg; Marcus Winther-John	23 (8 †)
1744	12 **	—N/a	Czechia	13	Adonxs	"Kiss Kiss Goodbye"	English	Lorenzo Calvo; Michaela Charvátová; Inés Coulon; Ronald Janeček; George Masters-Clark; Adam Pavlovčin; Adriano Lopes da Silva	DNQ (12)
1745	13 **	2	Luxembourg	39	Laura Thorn	"La poupée monte le son"	French	Christophe Houssin; Julien Salvia; Ludovic-Alexandre Vidal	22 (7 †)
1746	14 **	4	Israel	47	Yuval Raphael	"New Day Will Rise"	English, French, Hebrew	Keren Peles	2 (1 †)
1747	15 **	—N/a	Serbia	17	Princ	"Mila" (Мила)	Serbian	Dušan Bačić	DNQ (14)
1748	16 **	13	Finland	58	Erika Vikman	"Ich komme"	Finnish	Christel Roosberg; Jori Roosberg	11 (3 †)
1749	—N/a	6	Spain	64	Melody	"Esa diva"	Spanish	Alberto Lorite; Melodía Ruiz Gutiérrez	24
1750	—N/a	8	United Kingdom	67	Remember Monday	"What the Hell Just Happened?"	English	Julie Aagaard; Sam Brennan; Lauren Byrne; Tom Hollings; Holly-Anne Hull; Kes Kamara; Charlotte Steele; Thomas Stengaard	19
1751	—N/a	14	Italy	50	Lucio Corsi	"Volevo essere un duro"	Italian	Lucio Corsi; Tommaso Ottomano	5
1752	—N/a	16	Germany	68	Abor & Tynna	"Baller"	German	Attila Bornemisza; Tünde Bornemisza; Alexander Hauer	15
1753	—N/a	19	Switzerland	65	Zoë Më	"Voyage"	French	Zoë Kressler; Emily Middlemas; Tom Oehler	10
1754	—N/a	24	France	67	Louane	"Maman"	French	Anne Peichert; Tristan Salvati	7

Eurovision Song Contest 2026
#	R/O SF	R/O F	Country	#	Artist	Song	Language	Songwriter(s)	Placing
1755	1 *	16	Moldova	20	Satoshi	"Viva, Moldova!"	Romanian	Andrei Vulpe; Cătălin Temciuc; Vasile Advahov; Vlad Sabajuc	8 (4 †)
1756	2 *	20	Sweden	65	Felicia	"My System"	English	Audun Agnar; Emily Harbakk; Felicia Eriksson; Julie Bergan; Theresa Rex	20 (9 †)
1757	3 *	13	Croatia	31	Lelek	"Andromeda"	Croatian	Filip Lacković; Lazar Pajić; Tomislav Roso; Zorica Pajić	15 (6 †)
1758	4 *	6	Greece	46	Akylas	"Ferto" (Φέρτο)	Greek	Akylas Mytilinaios; Orfeas Nonis; Theofilos Pouzbouris; Thomas Papathanasis	10 (7 †)
1759	5 *	—N/a	Portugal	57	Bandidos do Cante	"Rosa"	Portuguese	Duarte Farias; Francisco Pereira; Francisco Pestana; Francisco Raposo; Gonçalo Narciso; Gui Alface; José Carlos Coelho Almeida Tavares; Luis Aleixo; Miguel Costa	DNQ (12)
1760	6 *	—N/a	Georgia	18	Bzikebi	"On Replay"	English	Giga Kukhianidze; Liza Japaridze	DNQ (15)
1761	7 *	17	Finland	59	Linda Lampenius and Pete Parkkonen	"Liekinheitin"	Finnish	Antti Riihimäki; Lauri Halavaara; Linda Lampenius; Pete Parkkonen; Vilma Alina Lähteenmäki	6 (3 †)
1762	8 *	—N/a	Montenegro	14	Tamara Živković	"Nova zora" (Нова зора)	Montenegrin	Boris Subotić	DNQ (13)
1763	9 *	—N/a	Estonia	31	Vanilla Ninja	"Too Epic to Be True"	English	Sven Lõhmus	DNQ (11)
1764	10 *	3	Israel	47	Noam Bettan	"Michelle"	French, Hebrew, English	Nadav Aharoni; Noam Bettan; Tzlil Klifi; Yuval Raphael	2 (1 †)
1765	11 *	4	Belgium	67	Essyla	"Dancing on the Ice"	English	Alice Van Eesbeeck; Barbara Petitjean; Emil Stengele; Nicolas d'Avell	21 (10 †)
1766	12 *	19	Lithuania	26	Lion Ceccah	"Sólo quiero más"	Lithuanian, English	Aurimas Galvelis; Tomas Alenčikas	22 (8 †)
1767	13 *	—N/a	San Marino	16	Senhit (Note: Features uncredited vocals by Boy George)	"Superstar"	English	Anderz Wrethov; George Alan O'Dowd; Julie Aagaard; John-Emil Johansson; Thomas Stengaard; Senhit Zadik Zadik	DNQ (14)
1768	14 *	18	Poland	28	Alicja	"Pray"	English	Alicja Szemplińska; Sinclair Alan Malcolm; Weronika Gabryelczyk	12 (2 †)
1769	15 *	9	Serbia	18	Lavina	"Kraj mene" (Крај мене)	Serbian	Andrija Cvetanović; Bojan Ilić; Ivan Jegdić; Luka Aranđelović; Nikola Petrović; Pavle Aranđelović; Pavle Samardžić	17 (5 †)
1770	1 **	12	Bulgaria	15	Dara	"Bangaranga"	English	Anne Judith Wik; Cristian Tarcea; Darina Yotova; Dimitris Kontopoulos	1 (1 †)
1771	2 **	—N/a	Azerbaijan	18	Jiva	"Just Go"	English, Azerbaijani	Fuad Javadov	DNQ (15)
1772	3 **	24	Romania	24	Alexandra Căpitănescu	"Choke Me"	English	Alexandra Căpitănescu; Călin-Alexandru Grăjdan; Elvis Silitră; Ștefan Condrea	3 (2 †)
1773	4 **	—N/a	Luxembourg	40	Eva Marija	"Mother Nature"	English	Eva Marija Kavaš Puc; Julie Aagaard; Maria Broberg; Thomas Stengaard	DNQ (12)
1774	5 **	11	Czechia	14	Daniel Žižka	"Crossroads"	English	Daniel Žižka; Viliam Béreš	16 (9 †)
1775	6 **	—N/a	Armenia	18	Simón	"Paloma Rumba"	English	David Tserunyan; Eva Voskanyan; Lilit Navasardyan; Roza Kostandyan	DNQ (14)
1776	7 **	—N/a	Switzerland	66	Veronica Fusaro	"Alice"	English	Charlie McClean; Veronica Fusaro	DNQ (11)
1777	8 **	21	Cyprus	42	Antigoni	"Jalla"	English, Greek	Antigoni Buxton; Charalambous Kallona; Connor Mullally-Knight; Demetris Nikolaou; Klejdi Lupa; Paris Kalpos; Trey Qua	19 (10 †)
1778	9 **	—N/a	Latvia	26	Atvara	"Ēnā"	Latvian	Jānis Jačmenkins; Liene Stūrmane	DNQ (13)
1779	10 **	1	Denmark	54	Søren Torpegaard Lund	"Før vi går hjem"	Danish	Clara Sofie Fabricius; Søren Torpegaard Lund; Thomas Meilstrup; Valdemar Littauer Bendixen	7 (5 †)
1780	11 **	8	Australia	11	Delta Goodrem	"Eclipse"	English	Delta Goodrem; Ferras Alqaisi; Jonas Myrin; Michael Fatkin	4 (3 †)
1781	12 **	7	Ukraine	21	Leléka	"Ridnym" (Рідним)	English, Ukrainian	Adama Cefalu; Jakob Hegner; Viktoriia Leleka; Yaroslav Dzhus	9 (6 †)
1782	13 **	5	Albania	22	Alis	"Nân"	Albanian	Alis Kallaçi; Desara Gjini	13 (7 †)
1783	14 **	10	Malta	38	Aidan	"Bella"	English, Maltese	Aidan Cassar; Joep van den Boom; Sarah Bonnici	18 (8 †)
1784	15 **	23	Norway	64	Jonas Lovv	"Ya Ya Ya"	English	Jonas Lovv Hellesøy; Sondre Skaftun	14 (4 †)
1785	—N/a	2	Germany	69	Sarah Engels	"Fire"	English	Dario Schürmann; Luisa Heinemann; Raphael Lott; Sarah Engels; Valentin Boes	23
1786	—N/a	14	United Kingdom	68	Look Mum No Computer	"Eins, Zwei, Drei"	English	Julie Aagaard; Lasse Midtsian Nymann; Sam Bartle; Thomas Stengaard	25 ◁
1787	—N/a	15	France	68	Monroe	"Regarde!"	French	Christopher Cohen; Fred Savio; Fredie Marche; Maxime Morise	11
1788	—N/a	22	Italy	51	Sal Da Vinci	"Per sempre sì"	Italian	Alessandro La Cava; Eugenio Maimone; Francesco Sorrentino; Federica Abbate; Federico Mercuri; Giordano Cremona; Salvatore Michael Sorrentino	5
1789	—N/a	25	Austria	58	Cosmó	"Tanzschein"	German	Benjamin Gedeon; Elias Stejskal; Ella Stern	24

== Withdrawn and disqualified entries ==
On a number of occasions, entries into the contest have been prevented from competing at a late stage, either through withdrawal by the participating broadcaster, or through disqualification or exclusion by the European Broadcasting Union. The list below highlights cases where an entry for a given country had been planned in a particular year but which ultimately did not occur, either by withdrawal, disqualification, exclusion or the cancellation of the contest.

On a number of occasions participation in the contest has been either suggested or attempted by countries which are ineligible due to a lack of a participating EBU member broadcaster, such as past media reports of interest by broadcasters in China, Kosovo, Liechtenstein and Qatar. Participation has also been suggested for a number of nations and territories whose participation is currently covered by another country. Potential entries from Wales and Scotland (currently countries of the United Kingdom) and the Faroe Islands (currently a territory of Denmark) have been reported, but are generally prevented due to the exclusive participation rights of the sovereign nation to which they belong. Wales and Scotland have participated in other Eurovision events where the United Kingdom as a whole do not participate, including the Junior Eurovision Song Contest and Eurovision Choir.

Rescinded Eurovision entries
Year	Country	Artist	Song	Language	Reason	Participated with another song or artist	Ref(s)
2004	France	Jonatan Cerrada	"Laissez-moi le temps"	French	Withdrawn	Yes	
2005	Belarus	Angelica Agurbash	"Boys and Girls"	English	Withdrawn	Yes	
2005	Lebanon	Aline Lahoud	"Quand tout s'enfuit"	French	Withdrawn	No	
2006	France	Virginie Pouchain	"Vous, c'est nous"	French	Withdrawn	Yes	
2006	Serbia and Montenegro	No Name	"Moja ljubavi" (Моја љубави)	Montenegrin	Withdrawn	No	
2009	Georgia	Stephane and 3G	"We Don't Wanna Put In"	English	Disqualified	No	
2009	Hungary	Márk Zentai	"If You Wanna Party"	Hungarian	Withdrawn	Yes	
2009	Hungary	Kátya Tompos	"Magányos csónak"	Hungarian	Withdrawn	Yes	
2010	Belarus	3+2	"Far Away"	English	Withdrawn	Yes	
2010	Ukraine	Vasyl Lazarovych	"I Love You"	English, Ukrainian	Withdrawn	Yes	
2010	Ukraine	Alyosha	"To Be Free"	English	Withdrawn	Yes	
2011	Belarus	Anastasia Vinnikova	"I Am Belarusian"	English	Disqualified	Yes	
2012	Armenia	No artist or song selected			Withdrawn	No	
2012	Belarus	Alyona Lanskaya	"All My Life"	English	Disqualified	Yes	
2013	Belarus	Alyona Lanskaya	"Rhythm of Love"	English	Withdrawn	Yes	
2013	Bulgaria	Elitsa Todorova and Stoyan Yankulov	"Kismet" (Кисмет)	Bulgarian	Withdrawn	Yes	
2013	North Macedonia	Esma and Lozano	"Imperija"	Macedonian	Withdrawn	Yes	
2015	Albania	Elhaida Dani	"Diell"	Albanian	Withdrawn	Yes	
2015	Germany	Andreas Kümmert	"Heart of Stone"	English	Withdrawn	Yes	
2016	Germany	Xavier Naidoo	No song selected (Note: Song would have been selected through a national final: Unser Song für Xavier)		Withdrawn	Yes	
2016	Malta	Ira Losco	"Chameleon"	English	Withdrawn	Yes	
2016	Romania	Ovidiu Anton	"Moment of Silence"	English	Excluded	No	
2017	Russia	Julia Samoylova	"Flame Is Burning"	English	Withdrawn	No	
2019	Ukraine	No artist or song selected (Note: Maruv won the Ukrainian national final with "Siren Song" but refused to participate at Eurovision. The Ukrainian broadcaster UA:PBC approached the second- and third-placed artists but they also refused, leading to Ukraine withdrawing from the competition.)			Withdrawn	No	
2021	Armenia	No artist or song selected			Withdrawn	No	
2021	Belarus	Galasy ZMesta	"Ya nauchu tebya (I'll Teach You)" (Я научу тебя)	Russian	Disqualified	No	
2021	Belarus	Galasy ZMesta	"Pesnya pro zaytsev (Song About Hares)" (Песня про зайцев)	Russian	Disqualified	No	
2022	Russia	No artist or song selected			Excluded	No	
2022	Ukraine	Alina Pash	"Shadows of Forgotten Ancestors"	Ukrainian, English	Withdrawn	Yes	
2024	Israel	Eden Golan	"October Rain"	English, Hebrew	Disqualified (Note: Israeli broadcaster Kan initially submitted "October Rain" to the 2024 contest. After the song was rejected due to the political nature of the lyrics, it was rewritten and retitled as "Hurricane", which was accepted by the EBU to compete.)	No (rewritten)	
2024	Netherlands	Joost Klein	"Europapa"	Dutch	Disqualified from the final	No	
2025	Moldova	No artist or song selected (Note: The artist and song would have been selected through the national final Etapa națională 2025)			Withdrawn	No	
2025	Montenegro	Neonoen	"Clickbait"	Montenegrin	Withdrawn	Yes	

=== Eurovision Song Contest 2020 ===
The Eurovision Song Contest 2020 was planned to be the 65th edition of the contest, however the contest was cancelled in March 2020 due to the COVID-19 pandemic. A statement released by the EBU following the cancellation confirmed that the entries chosen to compete in the 2020 contest would not be eligible to compete in 2021. Six of these entries were later performed out of competition as interval acts – "Empires" during the Junior Eurovision Song Contest 2020, "Fai rumore" during the first semi-final of the 2022 contest, and "Répondez-moi", "On Fire", "Cleopatra", and "All of My Love" during the second semi-final of the 2025 contest. As these songs were not performed live in competition, they are not counted in the running total of performed entries.

Eurovision Song Contest 2020
Country	Artist	Song	Language	Songwriter(s)
Albania	Arilena Ara	"Fall from the Sky"	English	Michael Blue; Lazar Cvetkoski; Darko Dimitrov; Sam Schummer; Robert Stevenson
Armenia	Athena Manoukian	"Chains on You"	English	Athena Manoukian; DJ Paco
Australia	Montaigne	"Don't Break Me"	English	Anthony Egizii; Montaigne; David Musumeci
Austria	Vincent Bueno	"Alive"	English	Artur Aigner; Vincent Bueno; Felix van Göns; David "Davey" Yang
Azerbaijan	Efendi	"Cleopatra"	English	Luuk van Beers; Sarah Lake; Alan Roy Scott
Belarus	VAL	"Da vidna" (Да відна)	Belarusian	Valeryja Hrybusava; Mikita Najdzionaŭ; Uladzislaŭ Paškievič
Belgium	Hooverphonic	"Release Me"	English	Alex Callier; Luca Chiaravalli
Bulgaria	Victoria	"Tears Getting Sober"	English	Victoria Georgieva; Lukas Oskar Janisch; Borislav Milanov; Cornelia Wiebols
Croatia	Damir Kedžo	"Divlji vjetre"	Croatian	Ante Pecotić
Cyprus	Sandro	"Running"	English	Alfie Arcuri; Octavian Rasinariu; Sebastian Rickards; Sandro; Teo DK
Czech Republic	Benny Cristo	"Kemama"	English	Ben Cristóvão; Rudy Ray; Charles Sarpong; Osama Verse-Atile; Filip Zangi
Denmark	Ben and Tan	"Yes"	English	Emil Adler Lei; Linnea Deb; Jimmy Jansson
Estonia	Uku Suviste	"What Love Is"	English	Uku Suviste; Sharon Vaughn
Finland	Aksel	"Looking Back"	English	Joonas Angeria; Connor McDonough; Riley McDonough; Toby McDonough; Whitney Phillips
France	Tom Leeb	"Mon alliée (The Best in Me)"	French, English	Peter Boström; Thomas G:son; Amir Haddad; Léa Ivanne; Tom Leeb; John Lundvik
Georgia	Tornike Kipiani	"Take Me as I Am"	English	Aleko Berdzenishvili; Tornike Kipiani
Germany	Ben Dolic	"Violent Thing"	English	Dag Lundberg; Connor Martin; Borislav Milanov; Peter St. James; Jimmy Thorén
Greece	Stefania	"Supergirl"	English	Arcade; Dimitris Kontopoulos; Sharon Vaughn
Iceland	Daði og Gagnamagnið	"Think About Things"	English	Daði Freyr
Ireland	Lesley Roy	"Story of My Life"	English	Catt Gravitt; Robert Marvin; Lesley Roy; Tom Shapiro
Israel	Eden Alene	"Feker Libi" (ፍቅር ልቤ)	English, Amharic	Doron Medalie; Idan Raichel
Italy	Diodato	"Fai rumore"	Italian	Antonio Diodato; Edwyn Roberts
Latvia	Samanta Tīna	"Still Breathing"	English	Aminata Savadogo; Samanta Tīna
Lithuania	The Roop	"On Fire"	English	Mantas Banišauskas; Robertas Baranauskas; Vaidotas Valiukevičius
Malta	Destiny	"All of My Love"	English	Sebastian Arman; Bernarda Brunović; Dag Lundberg; Borislav Milanov; Joacim Persson; Cesár Sampson
Moldova	Natalia Gordienko	"Prison"	English	Philipp Kirkorov; Dimitris Kontopoulos; Sharon Vaughn
Netherlands	Jeangu Macrooy	"Grow"	English	Jeangu Macrooy; Pieter Perquin
North Macedonia	Vasil	"You"	English	Kalina Neskoska; Nevena Neskoska; Alice Schroeder
Norway	Ulrikke	"Attention"	English	Ulrikke Brandstorp; Christian Ingebrigtsen; Kjetil Mørland
Poland	Alicja	"Empires"	English	Laurell Barker; Maria Broberg; Dominic Buczkowski-Wojtaszek; Patryk Kumór; Fraser Mac; Reece Pullinger
Portugal	Elisa	"Medo de sentir"	Portuguese	Marta Carvalho
Romania	Roxen	"Alcohol You"	English	Ionuț Armaș; Breyan Isaac; Viky Red
Russia	Little Big	"Uno"	English, Spanish	Little Big
San Marino	Senhit	"Freaky!"	English	Nanna Bottos; Gianluigi Fazio; Henrik Steen
Serbia	Hurricane	"Hasta la vista"	Serbian	Nemanja Antonić; Kosana Stojić; Sanja Vučić
Slovenia	Ana Soklič	"Voda"	Slovene	Bojan Simončič; Ana Soklič; Žiga Pirnat
Spain	Blas Cantó	"Universo"	Spanish	Blas Cantó; Dan Hammond; Ashley Hicklin; Dangelo Ortega; Mikołaj Trybulec
Sweden	The Mamas	"Move"	English	Herman Gardarfve; Patrik Jean; Melanie Wehbe
Switzerland	Gjon's Tears	"Répondez-moi"	French	Xavier Michel; Gjon Muharremaj; Alizé Oswald; Jeroen Swinnen
Ukraine	Go_A	"Solovey" (Соловей)	Ukrainian	Kateryna Pavlenko; Taras Shevchenko
United Kingdom	James Newman	"My Last Breath"	English	Adam Argyle; Ed Drewett; Iain James; James Newman

== See also ==
- List of countries in the Eurovision Song Contest
- List of Junior Eurovision Song Contest entries
