= Armenia in the Eurovision Song Contest 2022 =

- Eurovision Song Contest 2022
- Participating broadcaster: Public Television of Armenia (AMPTV)
- Country: Armenia
- Selection process: Internal selection
- Announcement date: Artist: 11 March 2022; Song: 19 March 2022

Competing entry
- Song: "Snap"
- Artist: Rosa Linn
- Songwriters: Rosa Linn; Larzz Principato; Jeremy Dusoulet; Allie Crystal; Tamar Kaprelian; Courtney Harrell

Placement
- Semi-final result: Qualified (5th, 187 points)
- Final result: 20th, 61 points

Participation chronology

Armenia was represented at the Eurovision Song Contest 2022 with the song "Snap" performed by Rosa Linn. The song was written by Rosa Linn, Larzz Principato, Jeremy Dusoulet, Allie Crystal, Tamar Kaprelian, and Courtney Harrell. The Armenian participating broadcaster, Public Television of Armenia (AMPTV), internally selected its entry for the contest. AMPTV announced the selection of Rosa Linn on 11 March 2022, while the song "Snap" was later presented to the public on 19 March 2022.

Armenia was drawn to compete in the first semi-final of the Eurovision Song Contest which took place on 10 May 2022. Performing as the closing entry during the show in position 17, "Snap" was announced among the top 10 entries of the first semi-final and therefore qualified to compete in the final on 14 May. It was later revealed that Armenia placed fifth out of the 17 participating countries in the semi-final with 187 points. In the final, Armenia performed in position 8 and placed twentieth out of the 25 participating countries, scoring 61 points.

== Background ==
Prior to the 2022 contest, the Public Television of Armenia (AMPTV) had participated in the Eurovision Song Contest representing Armenia thirteen times since its first entry in 2006. Its highest placing in the contest, to this point, has been fourth place, which the nation achieved on two occasions: in 2008 with the song "Qélé, Qélé" performed by Sirusho and in 2014 with the song "Not Alone" performed by Aram Mp3. Armenia had, to this point, failed to qualify to the final on three occasions, in 2011, 2018, and 2019, the latter with the song "Walking Out" performed by Srbuk. AMPTV briefly withdrew from the contest on two occasions: in 2012 due to long-standing tensions with then-host country Azerbaijan, and in 2021 due to social and political crises in the aftermath of the Second Nagorno-Karabakh War.

As part of its duties as participating broadcaster, AMPTV organises the selection of its entry in the Eurovision Song Contest and broadcasts the event in the country. Following their one-year absence, AMPTV confirmed its intentions to participate at the 2022 contest on 20 October 2021. The broadcaster has used various methods to select its entry in the past, such as internal selections and a live televised national final to choose the performer, song or both to compete at Eurovision. Between 2014 and 2016 and in 2019, the broadcaster internally selected both the artist and the song, while the national final Depi Evratesil was organized in 2017, 2018 and 2020. AMPTV opted to internally select its 2022 entry.

== Before Eurovision ==
=== Internal selection ===
AMPTV internally selected its entry for the Eurovision Song Contest 2022 together with local and international focus groups which included music professionals and Eurovision fans. Among acts rumoured by several Armenian media sites to be considered by the broadcaster were Athena Manoukian, Kamil Show, Rosa Linn and Saro Gevorgyan, the latter who submitted the song "Wicked Stranger" and was shortlisted along with Linn. Reports in February 2022 that Rosa Linn had been selected was denied by AMPTV, with the broadcaster's Head of Public Relations and Digital Communication Anna Ohanyan stating that no decision had been made yet and that the name of the artist would be announced in March 2022.

On 11 March 2022, Rosa Linn with the song "Snap", written and composed by Linn herself together with Larzz Principato, Jeremy Dusoulet, Allie Crystal, Tamar Kaprelian and Courtney Harrell, was announced as the Armenian entry. Tamar Kaprelian previously represented Armenia in 2015 as part of the group Genealogy. Rosa Linn filmed the official video for the song prior to the presentation, which was directed by Aramayis Hayrapetyan. The song and video were presented to the public on 19 March 2022.

I think we've all been at a snapping point, where it felt like there's no way out and that the entire world is just crumbling down around you. You start questioning everything, including yourself. I have been there. And what I realized was that I had the strength to shape my reality – it just took getting out of my own way and finding inner-peace. It's all about self-love and accepting that you are enough. Writing "Snap" was a form of therapy for me and I hope that it can be that for others who are also going through hard times.

— Rosa Linn

=== Promotion ===
Rosa Linn made appearances across Europe to promote "Snap" as the Armenian Eurovision entry. On 7 April, Linn performed during the Israel Calling event held at the Menora Mivtachim Arena in Tel Aviv, Israel. On 9 April, Linn performed during the Eurovision in Concert event which was held at the AFAS Live venue in Amsterdam, Netherlands and hosted by Cornald Maas and Edsilia Rombley. In addition to her international appearances, Rosa Linn recorded her 'live-on-tape' performance in Sofia, Bulgaria on 19 March. This would have been used in the event that she was unable to travel to Turin, or subjected to quarantine on arrival.

In the run-up to the contest, AMPTV launched the promotional series Flight to Eurovision that introduced and focused on Rosa Linn's journey to Turin, and covered the preparations for her Eurovision performance.

== At Eurovision ==
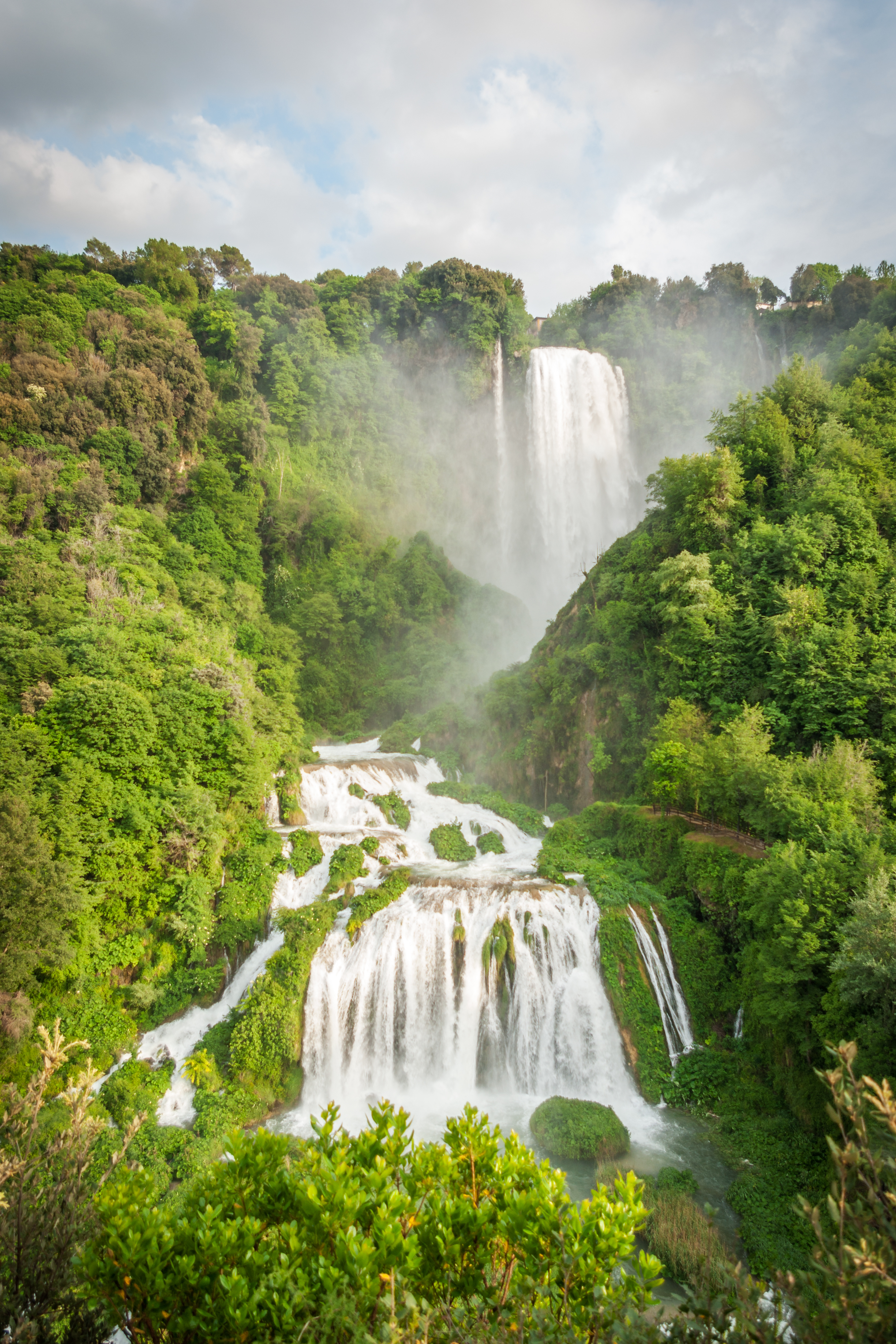
A video postcard introduced Rosa Linn's performance in the first semi-final and final of the Eurovision Song Contest 2022. The postcard was filmed at the Marmore Falls in Terni, Umbria and featured virtual projections of Rosa Linn across the location.

According to Eurovision rules, all nations with the exceptions of the host country and the "Big Five" (France, Germany, Italy, Spain and the United Kingdom) are required to qualify from one of two semi-finals in order to compete for the final; the top ten countries from each semi-final progress to the final. The European Broadcasting Union (EBU) split up the competing countries into six different pots based on voting patterns from previous contests, with countries with favourable voting histories put into the same pot. On 25 January 2022, an allocation draw was held which placed each country into one of the two semi-finals, as well as which half of the show they would perform in. Armenia was placed into the first semi-final, which was held on 10 May 2022, and was scheduled to perform in the second half of the show.

Once all the competing songs for the 2022 contest had been released, the running order for the semi-finals was decided by the shows' producers rather than through another draw, so that similar songs were not placed next to each other. Armenia was set to perform in position 17, following the entry from Norway. Immediately after the close of the first semi-final, a press conference was held in which each of the artists drew the half of the final of which they would perform in. Armenia was drawn into the first half of the final and was later selected by the EBU to perform in position number 8, following the entry from Norway and before the entry from Italy.

In Armenia, all shows were broadcast on Armenia 1 and on Public Radio of Armenia, with commentary by Garik Papoyan and Hrachuhi Utmazyan. AMPTV appointed Garik Papoyan as its spokesperson to announce the top 12-point score awarded by the Armenian jury during the final.

=== Semi-final ===
Rosa Linn took part in technical rehearsals on 1 and 5 May, followed by dress rehearsals on 9 and 10 May. This included the jury show on 9 May where the professional juries of each country watched and voted on the competing entries.

The Armenian performance featured Rosa Linn alone on stage in a house-like structure made out of paper, representing the overflow of emotions Linn felt when writing the song. Over the course of the performance, Rosa Linn tore down several parts of the walls to reveal statements about the song. At the climax of the performance, the house rotated and Linn tore down an entire circle of the wall to face the audience in an intimate performance. The majority of the Armenian performance was warmly lit with golden LED lights on stage. Armenia's prop was the second largest of the Eurovision Song Contest 2022, after Sam Ryder from the United Kingdom, which was also directed by Dan Shipton and Marvin Dietmann.

At the end of the show, Armenia was announced as having finished in the top 10 and subsequently qualifying for the grand final. This marked the first qualification to the final for Armenia since 2017. It was later revealed that the Armenia placed fifth in the semi-final, receiving a total of 187 points: 105 points from the televoting and 82 points from the juries.

=== Final ===
Shortly after the first semi-final, a winners' press conference was held for the ten qualifying countries. As part of this press conference, the qualifying artists took part in a draw to determine which half of the grand final they would subsequently participate in. This draw was done in the order the countries appeared in the semi-final running order. Armenia was drawn to compete in the first half. Following this draw, the shows' producers decided upon the running order of the final, as they had done for the semi-finals. Armenia was subsequently placed to perform in position number 8, following the entry from Norway and before the entry from Italy.

Rosa Linn once again took part in dress rehearsals on 13 and 14 May before the final, including the jury final where the professional juries cast their final votes before the live show. Linn performed a repeat of their semi-final performance during the final on 14 May. Armenia placed 20th in the final, scoring 61 points: 21 points from the televoting and 40 points from the juries. This marked Armenia's worst result in a Eurovision final since the country's debut in 2006.

=== Voting ===
Below is a breakdown of points awarded to Armenia in the first semi-final and in the final. Voting during the three shows involved each country awarding two sets of points from 1–8, 10 and 12: one from their professional jury and the other from televoting. The exact composition of the professional jury, and the results of each country's jury and televoting were released after the final; the individual results from each jury member were also released in an anonymised form. The Armenian jury consisted of Vika Martirosyan, Arshaluys Harutyunyan, Erik Karapetyan, Lilit Navarsardyan, and Srbuk, the latter of whom represented Armenia in 2019. In the first semi-final, Armenia placed 5th with 187 points, receiving maximum twelve points in the jury vote from Austria and twelve points in the televote from France. This marked the first Armenian qualification to the final since 2017. In the final, Armenia placed 20th with 61 points. Over the course of the contest, Armenia awarded its 12 points to Netherlands (jury) and Ukraine (televote) in the first semi-final, and to Spain (jury) and Estonia (televote) in the final.

==== Points awarded to Armenia ====
Points awarded to Armenia (Semi-final 1)
Score	Televote	Jury
12 points	France	Austria
10 points	Bulgaria	Ukraine
8 points	Austria; Greece; Netherlands	Bulgaria; Italy
7 points	Albania; Italy; Moldova	Albania; France; Norway
6 points		Moldova
5 points	Croatia; Denmark; Norway; Portugal; Switzerland	
4 points	Latvia; Lithuania	Netherlands
3 points	Iceland	Iceland; Portugal
2 points	Ukraine	Denmark; Latvia
1 point		Croatia; Slovenia; Switzerland

Points awarded to Armenia (Final)
Score	Televote	Jury
12 points		
10 points	Georgia	
8 points		Italy
7 points		France
6 points		Austria
5 points	Bulgaria; France	Bulgaria
4 points		Albania; Norway
3 points		
2 points		Sweden; Ukraine
1 point	Cyprus	Finland; Portugal

==== Points awarded by Armenia ====
Points awarded by Armenia (Semi-final 1)
Score	Televote	Jury
12 points	Ukraine	Netherlands
10 points	Greece	Portugal
8 points	Portugal	Greece
7 points	Lithuania	Ukraine
6 points	Moldova	Norway
5 points	Austria	Switzerland
4 points	Netherlands	Croatia
3 points	Norway	Iceland
2 points	Albania	Latvia
1 point	Switzerland	Moldova

Points awarded by Armenia (Final)
Score	Televote	Jury
12 points	Estonia	Spain
10 points	Ukraine	Italy
8 points	Spain	Portugal
7 points	Sweden	France
6 points	Serbia	Ukraine
5 points	Moldova	Sweden
4 points	Portugal	Netherlands
3 points	Greece	Estonia
2 points	Lithuania	Greece
1 point	United Kingdom	Moldova

==== Detailed voting results ====
The following members comprised the Armenian jury:

- Vika Martirosyan (Amaras Vika) – choreographer, dancer
- Arshaluys Harutyunyan – film & theater director
- Erik Karapetyan – Singer-songwriter
- Lilit Navarsardyan – Composer, wrote the Armenian Eurovision entry in 2016
- Srbuk – singer, represented Armenia in the Eurovision Song Contest 2019

Detailed voting results from Armenia (Semi-final 1)
R/O	Country	Jury							Televote	
R/O	Country	Juror 1	Juror 2	Juror 3	Juror 4	Juror 5	Rank	Points	Rank	Points
01	Albania	12	10	16	12	15	16		9	2
02	Latvia	5	16	15	8	14	9	2	16	
03	Lithuania	10	15	14	13	10	14		4	7
04	Switzerland	6	8	13	5	8	6	5	10	1
05	Slovenia	11	14	12	11	9	13		13	
06	Ukraine	4	4	4	2	5	4	7	1	12
07	Bulgaria	13	6	11	14	13	12		14	
08	Netherlands	2	3	1	4	1	1	12	7	4
09	Moldova	7	12	10	10	12	10	1	5	6
10	Portugal	1	5	3	1	3	2	10	3	8
11	Croatia	15	7	9	6	6	7	4	11	
12	Denmark	16	11	8	15	16	15		15	
13	Austria	14	13	7	9	11	11		6	5
14	Iceland	9	9	6	16	7	8	3	12	
15	Greece	3	1	5	3	2	3	8	2	10
16	Norway	8	2	2	7	4	5	6	8	3
17	Armenia									

Detailed voting results from Armenia (Final)
R/O	Country	Jury							Televote	
R/O	Country	Juror 1	Juror 2	Juror 3	Juror 4	Juror 5	Rank	Points	Rank	Points
01	Czech Republic	12	9	15	13	23	14		22	
02	Romania	21	19	9	12	10	12		19	
03	Portugal	1	13	8	3	1	3	8	7	4
04	Finland	22	16	21	21	19	23		11	
05	Switzerland	18	15	13	20	11	16		20	
06	France	9	3	4	6	9	4	7	12	
07	Norway	13	18	10	7	16	11		17	
08	Armenia									
09	Italy	2	1	2	2	3	2	10	14	
10	Spain	3	2	1	1	2	1	12	3	8
11	Netherlands	7	7	6	4	7	7	4	15	
12	Ukraine	6	11	5	5	4	5	6	2	10
13	Germany	23	12	16	18	12	18		13	
14	Lithuania	20	14	22	19	14	20		9	2
15	Azerbaijan	24	24	24	24	24	24		24	
16	Belgium	19	10	20	22	13	17		16	
17	Greece	14	6	11	8	6	9	2	8	3
18	Iceland	16	17	23	17	22	21		23	
19	Moldova	15	8	14	9	8	10	1	6	5
20	Sweden	4	4	3	14	18	6	5	4	7
21	Australia	17	20	17	23	21	22		21	
22	United Kingdom	8	22	19	16	15	15		10	1
23	Poland	11	23	18	15	20	19		18	
24	Serbia	10	21	12	10	17	13		5	6
25	Estonia	5	5	7	11	5	8	3	1	12

== After Eurovision ==
Following the contest, "Snap" went viral on video sharing service TikTok, featuring in almost 360,000 clips on the service by July 2022. The song reached the top of the charts in the Flanders region of Belgium, and the top ten in Germany, Austria, Netherlands, Ireland, Italy, Norway, Sweden and Switzerland. It also reached the charts in 23 other music markets, including peaking at number 21 on the UK Singles Chart and number 67 on the US Billboard Hot 100, the latter making "Snap" the second Eurovision entry of the 21st century to enter the chart, after "Arcade" by Duncan Laurence, winner of the 2019 contest for the Netherlands.
