= Armenia in the Eurovision Song Contest 2020 =

- Eurovision Song Contest 2020
- Participating broadcaster: Public Television of Armenia (AMPTV)
- Country: Armenia
- Selection process: Depi Evratesil 2020
- Selection date: 15 February 2020

Competing entry
- Song: "Chains on You"
- Artist: Athena Manoukian
- Songwriters: Athena Manoukian; DJ Paco

Placement
- Final result: Contest cancelled

Participation chronology

Armenia was set to be represented at the Eurovision Song Contest 2020 with the song "Chains on You", written by Athena Manoukian and DJ Paco, and performed by Athena Manoukian. The Armenian participating broadcaster, the Public Television of Armenia (AMPTV), selected its entry through the national final Depi Evratesil 2020. The national final took place on 15 February 2020 where twelve entries competed. "Chains on You" performed by Athena Manoukian was selected as the winner following the combination of votes from an international jury, an Armenian jury and a public televote.

Armenia was drawn to compete in the second semi-final of the Eurovision Song Contest which took place on 14 May 2020. However, the contest was cancelled due to the COVID-19 pandemic.

== Background ==
Prior to the 2020 Contest, the Public Television of Armenia (AMPTV) had participated in the Eurovision Song Contest representing Armenia thirteen times since its first entry in 2006. Its highest placing in the contest, to this point, has been fourth place, achieved on two occasions: in 2008 with the song "Qélé, Qélé" performed by Sirusho and in 2014 with the song "Not Alone" performed by Aram Mp3. Armenia had, to this point, failed to qualify to the final on three occasions, in 2011, 2018, and 2019, the latter with the song "Walking Out" performed by Srbuk. AMPTV briefly withdrew from the contest in 2012 due to long-standing tensions with then host country Azerbaijan.

As part of its duties as participating broadcaster, AMPTV organises the selection of its entry in the Eurovision Song Contest and broadcasts the event in the country. The broadcaster confirmed their intentions to participate at the 2020 contest on 29 October 2019. AMPTV has used various methods to select its entry in the past, such as internal selections and a live televised national final to choose the performer, song or both to compete at Eurovision. Between 2014 and 2016, the broadcaster internally selected both the artist and the song, while the national final Depi Evratesil was organized in 2017 and 2018. The broadcaster opted to internally select its 2019 entry, however, AMPTV announced on 5 November 2019 that Depi Evratesil would select its entry for the 2020 contest.

== Before Eurovision ==
=== Depi Evratesil 2020 ===
Depi Evratesil 2020 ("Towards Eurovision 2020") was the third edition of the national final Depi Evratesil organised by AMPTV to select its entry for the Eurovision Song Contest 2020. The competition took place on 15 February 2020 at the AMPTV studios in Yerevan, hosted by Mane Grigoryan and Arman Margaryan. Twelve entries competed and the winner was determined by the combination of votes from international and Armenian jury panels and a public vote. The show was broadcast on Armenia 1 as well as online via the broadcaster's website 1tv.am.

==== Competing entries ====
On 5 November 2019, AMPTV announced an online submission period with a deadline of 31 December 2019. Artists were required to be aged at least 16 and are of Armenian citizenship or heritage, and were also required to submit a cover version of another song along with their entry submission. Songwriters worldwide were able to submit songs. The broadcaster received 53 entries at the closing of the deadline. A nine-member jury panel selected twelve entries to proceed to the national final, which were announced on 5 February 2020. The selection jury consisted of Naira Gurjinyan, Anita Hakhverdyan, Lilia Nikoyan, Ruben Babayan, Vardan Hakobyan, Tigran Danielyan, David Tserunyan, Karen Tataryan and Anush Ter-Ghukasyan. Among the competing artists was Vladimir Arzumanyan who won Junior Eurovision for Armenia in 2010, and Tokionine, who co-wrote the entry for Armenia in 2019.

Artist	Song	Songwriter(s)
Agop	"Butterflies"	Haik Solar, Arni Rock, Dzovinar Melkom Melkomian
Arthur Aleq	"Heaven"	Arthur Aleq
Athena Manoukian	"Chains on You"	Athena Manoukian, DJ Paco
Erna	"Life Faces"	Zaruhi Petrosyan, Zarine Mkhitaryan
Eva Rida	"No Love"	Eva Rida
Gabriel Jeeg	"It's Your Turn"	Gabriel Jeeg, Tigran Atayan
Hayk Music	"What It Is to Be in Love"	Hayk Music
Karina Evn	"Why?"	Edward Meison
Miriam Baghdasaryan	"Run Away"	Dan Cinelli, Miriam Baghdasaryan
Sergey and Nikolay Harutyunov	"Ha, Take a Step"	Sergey Harutyunov, Nikolay Harutyunov
Tokionine	"Save Me"	David Badalyan, George Brainshaker, Vova Baghmanyan, Suzanne Khanzadyan
Vladimir Arzumanyan	"What's Going On Mama"	Martin Mirzoyan, Grigor Kyokchyan

==== Final ====
The final took place on 15 February 2020. Twelve entries competed and the winner, "Chains on You" performed by Athena Manoukian, was selected by the combination of votes from a five-member international jury (1/3), a five-member Armenian jury (1/3) and a public vote (1/3). In addition to the performances of the competing entries, the interval acts featured Iveta Mukuchyan, who represented Armenia in 2016, with "Rich Bitch" and "LoveWave", and Karina Ignatyan, who represented Armenia in Junior Eurovision 2019, with "Colours of Your Dream".

Final – 15 February 2020
R/O	Artist	Song	Jury		Televote		Total	Place
R/O	Artist	Song	Intl.	Armenian	Votes	Points	Total	Place
1	Agop	"Butterflies"	27	33	111	15	75	10
2	Karina Evn	"Why?"	30	29	149	25	84	8
3	Hayk Music	"What It Is to Be in Love"	27	20	63	10	57	12
4	Erna	"Life Faces"	34	31	1,016	55	120	2
5	Eva Rida	"No Love"	40	39	56	5	84	9
6	Athena Manoukian	"Chains on You"	60	58	662	50	168	1
7	Gabriel Jeeg	"It’s Your Turn"	39	20	490	40	99	5
8	Sergey and Nikolay Harutyunov	"Ha, Take a Step"	15	36	619	45	96	7
9	Miriam Baghdasaryan	"Run Away"	33	40	440	35	108	4
10	Vladimir Arzumanyan	"What’s Going On Mama"	27	31	3,344	60	118	3
11	Arthur Aleq	"Heaven"	30	15	135	20	65	11
12	Tokionine	"Save Me"	28	38	299	30	96	6

Detailed International Jury Votes
R/O	Song	Jury					Total
R/O	Song	1	2	3	4	5	Total
1	"Butterflies"	1	6	8	6	6	27
2	"Why?"	9	1	4	5	11	30
3	"What It is to Be in Love"	5	9	7	4	2	27
4	"Life Faces"	3	10	10	8	3	34
5	"No Love"	11	7	11	10	1	40
6	"Chains on You"	12	12	12	12	12	60
7	"It's Your Turn"	6	11	6	9	7	39
8	"Ha, Take a Step"	2	5	2	2	4	15
9	"Run Away"	10	8	9	1	5	33
10	"What's Going On Mama"	7	3	5	3	9	27
11	"Heaven"	8	2	1	11	8	30
12	"Save Me"	4	4	3	7	10	28
International Jury Members
Belarus: Olga Salamakha (TV producer); Israel: Tali Eshkoli (TV producer, Eurovision expert); Georgia: Natia Mshvenieradze (TV producer); Malta: Gordon Bonello (Show producer, creative director); Russia: Ekaterina Orlova (ESC Head of Delegation)

Detailed Armenian Jury Votes
R/O	Song	Jury					Total
R/O	Song	1	2	3	4	5	Total
1	"Butterflies"	11	7	2	9	4	33
2	"Why"	1	10	8	5	5	29
3	"What It is to Be in Love"	3	2	3	11	1	20
4	"Life Faces"	4	9	4	8	6	31
5	"No Love"	6	11	7	4	11	39
6	"Chains on You"	12	12	12	12	10	58
7	"It's Your Turn"	2	3	6	1	8	20
8	"Ha, Take a Step"	10	1	11	2	12	36
9	"Run Away"	9	8	10	6	7	40
10	"What's Going On Mama"	7	5	9	7	3	31
11	"Heaven"	5	4	1	3	2	15
12	"Save Me"	8	6	5	10	9	38
Armenian Jury Members
Armen Sargsyan (AMPTV creative producer); Teresa Karimyan (AMPTV program director, TV producer); Tigran Danielyan (AMPTV Director of Public Relations and External Relations); Stepan Zakaryan (AMPTV Board member); Yervand Yerznkyan (Composer, artistic director of the AMPTV Symphonic and Variety Orchestra)

=== Preparation ===
Athena Manoukian filmed the official video for "Chains on You" following her win at Depi Evratesil 2020. Production changes for the song were made by Artem Valter, while the video was directed by Arthur Manukyan and featured fashion designs by Mary Stepanyan and Aram Nikolyan. The video was released via the official Eurovision Song Contest's YouTube channel on 13 March 2020.

== At Eurovision ==
According to Eurovision rules, all nations with the exceptions of the host country and the "Big Five" (France, Germany, Italy, Spain and the United Kingdom) are required to qualify from one of two semi-finals in order to compete for the final; the top ten countries from each semi-final progress to the final. The European Broadcasting Union (EBU) split up the competing countries into six different pots based on voting patterns from previous contests, with countries with favourable voting histories put into the same pot. On 28 January 2020, a special allocation draw was held which placed each country into one of the two semi-finals, as well as which half of the show they would perform in. Estonia was placed into the second semi-final, to be held on 14 May 2020, and was scheduled to perform in the second half of the show. However, due to 2019-20 pandemic of Coronavirus, the contest was cancelled.

During the Eurovision Song Celebration YouTube broadcast in place of the semi-finals, it was revealed that Armenia was set to perform in position 14, following the entry from Finland and before the entry from Portugal.
