= Athena Manoukian =

Greek singer and songwriter (born 1994)

Athena Manoukian Αθηνά Μανουκιάν Աթենա Մանուկյան
- Born: 22 May 1994 (age 32); Athens, Greece
- Genres: Pop; dance; R&B; hip-hop
- Occupations: Singer; songwriter
- Years active: 2007–present

Athena Manoukian (Greek: Αθηνά Μανουκιάν [aθiˈna manuˈcan]; Armenian: Աթենա Մանուկյան [ɑtʰɛˈnɑ mɑnuˈkjɑn]; born 22 May 1994) is a Greek singer and songwriter. She was set to represent Armenia in the Eurovision Song Contest 2020 with the song "Chains on You" prior to the contest's cancellation.

== Early life and career ==
Athena Manoukian was born on 22 May 1994 in Athens to a Greek mother and a Greek father of Armenian origin. Her first experience in the music industry was in 2007, when she participated in and won first prize at a talent contest called "This Is What's Missing", a television program of the Greek channel Alpha TV. A year later, in 2008, she participated in the Greek national selection for the Junior Eurovision Song Contest 2008 with the song To Fili Tis Aphroditis. In 2011, Manoukian released her first single named Party Like A Freak. Following the success of Party Like A Freak, which was nominated twice for winning an award at the MAD Video Music Awards, in 2012 she released a follow-up single I Surrender. She added a new song to her music discography a few months later named Na Les Pos M' agapas. Manoukian also received a Gold Disc for Party Like A Freak, I Surrender and Na Les Pos M'agapas.

In 2014, Manoukian released the single XO, published by Warner/Chappell and Max Music Scandinavia. The track was recorded in Sweden, Stockholm, and its music video was shot in Australia, Sydney. She reached number 1 in charts and won the Armenian Pulse Awards competition for Best Song In English. In 2017, Manoukian wrote the music and lyrics for Palia Mou Agapi, performed by Helena Paparizou.

In 2018, Manoukian performed an audition on the UK version of The X Factor.

She was also being discussed to represent Armenia in Eurovision Song Contest, particularly in 2015 and 2016. She expressed a desire to compete in Eurovision for either Armenia, Greece, or Cyprus. She won Depi Evratesil 2020, the third season of the Armenian national selection and was supposed to represent Armenia in the Eurovision Song Contest 2020 in Rotterdam, The Netherlands with the Hip-Hop and R&B inspired song "Chains on You". However this event was cancelled due to the 2019-20 coronavirus pandemic and replaced with Eurovision: Europe Shine a Light and Eurovision Song Celebration, which revealed she would have performed 14th in the second semi final. She also appeared on BBC's Newsbeat documentary sending a video message to fans.

On the same weekend as Shine A Light, she released a new Tropical house inspired song Dolla, written by Athena herself and DJ Paco. She was the creative, artistic and the main director of "Dolla"'s music video, which she released in July that year. Before Depi Evratesil had taken place, and before the COVID-19 pandemic forced Eurovision to be cancelled, she had revealed she was working on a first full-length album in an interview with Wiwibloggs chief editor William Lee Adams. In early 2021, she released the ballad You Should Know which she wrote herself.

However, in March of that year, it was confirmed that she would not be reselected to represent Armenia in the Eurovision Song Contest 2021, since they withdrew after originally planning to participate, citing the after-effects of the 2020 Nagorno-Karabakh War. She appeared in Wiwibloggs' Wiwijam at home events both times performing her 3 most recent singles in the latter alongside DJ Paco, producer of all 3 songs, all of which were written by Manoukian herself.

That autumn, she released her next song, OMG. She wrote the song along with the German singer/songwriter Annemarie Eilfeld. Later in spring of 2022 she released her latest single Kiss Me In The Rain, which she also wrote herself along with DJ Paco. She then went into latin music, with Loca, a Greek-Spanish song, and Bom Bom an English-Spanish song written by Manoukian and producer Limitless. She followed this release with the single Gone, an English song written by Dimitri Stassos devoted to all the victims of the Tempi train crash, the deadliest rail disaster in Greek history. In 2023, Manoukian released a Greek song named Tet A Tet, followed by her next Greek single Belas. In 2024, Manoukian released a Greek single Enstikto.

In a single month in early 2025, she released Psycho whilst supporting Konstantinos Argiros gigs in Cyprus, Albania, Bulgaria and Romania and also got her long-awaited return to Depi Evratesil - held for the first time since her 2020 win of it - with new song DaQueenNation, a song she wrote herself along with DJ Paco. She wrote the lyrics of the song and they wrote the music together. DaQueenation included references to Chains On You and talked about her life and all the obstacles and risks she took to achieve her goals, but this time she placed 3rd behind Parg - who therefore represented Armenia in Basel - and Simon (3rd with jury, 2nd with televotes).

== Discography ==
=== Singles ===
As lead artist

Title	Year	Album
"I Surrender"	2012	Non-album singles
"Na Les Pos M'Agapas" (featuring S i N)	2012	Non-album singles
"XO"	2014	Non-album singles
"Chains on You"	2020	Non-album singles
"Dolla"	2020	Non-album singles
"You Should Know"	2021	Non-album singles
"OMG"	2021	Non-album singles
"Kiss Me In The Rain"	2022	Non-album singles
"Loca" (With Limitless)	2022	Non-album singles
"Bom Bom"	2022	Non-album singles
"Gone"	2023	Non-album singles
"Tet A Tet"	2023	Non-album singles
"Belas"	2024	Non-album singles
"Enstikto"	2024	Non-album singles
"Psycho"	2025	Non-album singles
"DaQueenNation"	2025	Non-album singles
"Tha Melagholiso"	2026	Non-album singles

As featured artist

Title	Year	Album
"Party Like a Freak" (DJ Kas featuring Athena Manoukian)	2011	Non-album single

== Awards ==
Year	Award	Category	City	Result
2015	Armenian Pulse Music Awards	Best English Song (XO)	Yerevan, Armenia	Won

Awards and achievements
Preceded by Srbuk with "Walking Out"	Armenia in the Eurovision Song Contest; 2020 (cancelled)	Succeeded by Rosa Linn with "Snap"
