= Armenia in the Eurovision Song Contest =

- Eurovision Song Contest
- Participating broadcaster: Public Television Company of Armenia (AMPTV)

Participation summary
- Appearances: 18 (14 finals)
- First appearance: 2006
- Highest placement: 4th: 2008, 2014
- Participation history: 2006; 2007; 2008; 2009; 2010; 2011; ~~2012~~; 2013; 2014; 2015; 2016; 2017; 2018; 2019; ~~2020~~; ~~2021~~; 2022; 2023; 2024; 2025; 2026

Related articles
- Depi Evratesil

External links
- AMPTV page
- Armenia's page at Eurovision.com
- For the most recent participation see Armenia in the Eurovision Song Contest 2026

Armenia has been represented in the Eurovision Song Contest 18 times since making its debut in 2006, when André became its first Eurovision representative and the first artist from the Caucasus region to compete in the contest. The Armenian participating broadcaster in the contest is the Public Television Company of Armenia (AMPTV).

Armenia has achieved eight top-10 finishes, with the country's best result in the contest being two fourth-place finishes, achieved with "Qélé, Qélé" by Sirusho (2008) and "Not Alone" by Aram Mp3 (2014).

In 2011, Armenia failed to qualify for the final for the first time. This was followed by the country withdrawing from the 2012 contest due to security concerns in the host city, Baku. Armenia later failed to qualify again in 2018, 2019, and 2026, marking the country's second, third, and fourth non-qualifications, respectively. Armenia had originally planned to participate in the 2021 contest, but withdrew before selecting an entry.

== Participation ==
Armenia first expressed interest in participating in the Eurovision Song Contest in July 2003, when private broadcaster Armenia TV claimed that it would debut at the 2004 contest, despite not being a member of the European Broadcasting Union (EBU), which organises the event. The EBU later denied this claim.

Public Television Company of Armenia (AMPTV) became a full member of the European Broadcasting Union (EBU) in July 2005, thus eligible to participate in the Eurovision Song Contest since then. It has participated in the contest representing Armenia since its 51st edition in 2006.

== History ==
Armenia officially debuted in the contest in 2006 with the song "Without Your Love", performed by one of Armenia's top artists, André, and produced by Anush Hovnanyan. At the time, only the top ten countries from contest's previous edition and the "Big Four" automatically qualified for the final, meaning Armenia had to compete in the semi-final. Performing first in the semi-final, André successfully qualified Armenia for the final on 20 May 2006, where the country finished in eighth place. By reaching the top ten, Armenia automatically qualified for the 2007 final, where it again finished eighth.

In 2008, Armenia achieved its first top-five result when Sirusho finished fourth with "Qélé, Qélé". The song received eight sets of 12 points in the final, the highest number awarded to any entry that year. Armenia followed this with two more top-ten finishes in 2009 and 2010, becoming one of only three countries at the time to place in the top ten every year since the introduction of the semi-finals.

This streak ended in the 2011 contest, when Emmy failed to qualify for the final with "Boom Boom", missing qualification from the first semi-final by one point. On 7 March 2012, Armenia announced its withdrawal from the 2012 contest due to security concerns surrounding the event in the host city Baku, before returning the following year.

In 2014, Armenia equalled its best result from 2008, with Aram Mp3 and his song "Not Alone" finishing fourth. Armenia subsequently reached the final in 10 of its first 11 participations. The country failed to qualify for the second time in 2018, placing 15th in the first semi-final, and for the third time in 2019, placing 16th in the second semi-final. Although Armenia initially planned to participate in the 2021 contest, it later withdrew due to the social and political crisis following the Second Nagorno-Karabakh War.

Armenia returned to the contest in 2022, when Rosa Linn qualified for the final with "Snap" and ultimately finished 20th, marking the country's first qualification since 2017. Brunette with "Future Lover" placed 14th in 2023, followed by Ladaniva with "Jako" placing eighth in 2024. In 2025, AMPTV revived the Depi Evratesil national final format for the first time in five years, selecting Parg to represent the country with "Survivor". Armenia qualified for the final that year, extending the country's qualification streak to four consecutive contests. In 2026, Armenia recorded its worst result to date, placing 14th out of 15 participants in the semi-final and failing to qualify with "Paloma Rumba" performed by Simón.

AMPTV also produces the programme "Eurovision Diary", which follows the experiences of Armenia's Eurovision entrants from their selection through to the contest final.

== Participation overview ==
Table key
| 2 | Second place |
| 3 | Third place |
| ◇ | Entry selected but did not compete |
| † | Upcoming event |

| Year | Artist | Song | Language | Final | Points | Semi | Points |
|---|---|---|---|---|---|---|---|
| 2006 | André | "Without Your Love" | English | 8 | 129 | 6 | 150 |
| 2007 | Hayko | "Anytime You Need" | English, Armenian | 8 | 138 | Top 10 in 2006 final (Note: According to the then-Eurovision rules, the top ten non-Big Four countries from the previous year along with the Big Four automatically qualified for the Grand Final without having to compete in semi-finals. For example, if Germany and France placed inside the top ten, the 11th and 12th spots were advanced to next year's Grand Final along with all countries ranked in the top ten.) | |
| 2008 | Sirusho | "Qélé, Qélé" (Քելե, Քելե) | English, Armenian | 4 | 199 | 2 | 139 |
| 2009 | Inga and Anush | "Jan Jan" (Ջան Ջան) | English, Armenian | 10 | 92 | 5 | 99 |
| 2010 | Eva Rivas | "Apricot Stone" | English | 7 | 141 | 6 | 83 |
| 2011 | Emmy | "Boom Boom" | English | Failed to qualify | | 12 | 54 |
| 2013 | Dorians | "Lonely Planet" | English | 18 | 41 | 7 | 69 |
| 2014 | Aram Mp3 | "Not Alone" | English | 4 | 174 | 4 | 121 |
| 2015 | Genealogy | "Face the Shadow" | English | 16 | 34 | 7 | 77 |
| 2016 | Iveta Mukuchyan | "LoveWave" | English | 7 | 249 | 2 | 243 |
| 2017 | Artsvik | "Fly with Me" | English | 18 | 79 | 7 | 152 |
| 2018 | Sevak Khanagyan | "Qami" (Քամի) | Armenian | Failed to qualify | | 15 | 79 |
| 2019 | Srbuk | "Walking Out" | English | Failed to qualify | | 16 | 49 |
| 2020 | Athena Manoukian ◇ | "Chains on You" ◇ | English ◇ | Contest cancelled (Note: The 2020 contest was cancelled due to the COVID-19 pandemic.) | | | |
| 2022 | Rosa Linn | "Snap" | English | 20 | 61 | 5 | 187 |
| 2023 | Brunette | "Future Lover" | English, Armenian | 14 | 122 | 6 | 99 |
| 2024 | Ladaniva | "Jako" (Ժակո) | Armenian | 8 | 183 | 3 | 137 |
| 2025 | Parg | "Survivor" | English, Armenian | 20 | 72 | 10 | 51 |
| 2026 | Simón | "Paloma Rumba" | English | Failed to qualify | | 14 | 49 |
| 2027 | Appeared on list of participants † | | | | | | |

== Awards ==
Marcel Bezençon Awards won by Armenia
| Year | Host city | Category | Song | Performer(s) | Composer(s) | Final | Points | Ref. |
|---|---|---|---|---|---|---|---|---|
| 2008 | (Serbia) Belgrade | Fan Award | "Qélé, Qélé" | Sirusho | H.A. Der-Hovagimian, Sirusho | 4 | 199 | |

== Related involvement ==
=== Heads of delegation ===
Each participating broadcaster in the Eurovision Song Contest appoints a head of delegation, who serves as the broadcaster's main contact with the European Broadcasting Union and leads the country's delegation at the contest. The size of each delegation can vary considerably and typically includes the performers, songwriters, composers, backing vocalists, and members of the press team, among others.

| Year | Head of delegation | Ref. |
|---|---|---|
| 2006–2010 | Diana Mnatsakanyan | |
| 2011–2018 | Gohar Gasparyan | |
| 2019–2023 | David Tserunyan and Anush Ter-Ghukasyan | |
| 2024– | David Tserunyan | |

=== Jury members ===
The modern system of jury voting was introduced at the 2009 contest. Each participating broadcaster assembles a jury panel composed of music industry professionals, whose members rank all entries except their own country's. From 2010 to 2022, jury votes accounted for 50% of the overall result in both the semi-finals and the final, alongside the public televote. In 2009 (Note: In 2009, only the final tenth qualifying place in each semi-final was awarded based on the back-up jury ranking) and from 2023 to 2025, however, the semi-finals were decided solely by televoting, while juries contributed only to the results of the final. Beginning with the 2026 contest, juries were reintroduced in the semi-finals, with each participating broadcaster expanding its jury panel from five to seven members. Since 2014, the organizers have publicly disclosed the names of all jury members in order to increase transparency in the voting process.

| Year | First member | Second member | Third member | Fourth member | Fifth member | Sixth member | Seventh member | Ref. |
|---|---|---|---|---|---|---|---|---|
| 2014 | Asatur Asatryan | Arman Davtyan | Inga Arshakyan | Anush Arshakyan | Avet Barseghyan | | | |
| 2015 | Grigor Nazaryan | Nune Yesayan | Leyla Saribekyan | Aram MP3 | Aren Bayadyan | | | |
| 2016 | DJ Dale | Erik Karapetyan | Hayko | Miqayel Voskanyan | Naira Gyurjinyan | | | |
| 2017 | Ara Gevorgyan | Aramayis Hayrapetyan | Emma Asatryan | Tigran Sanoyan | Zaruhi Babayan | | | |
| 2018 | Aramo | Armen Galyan | Manch | Masha Mnjoyan | Shushanik Arevshatyan | | | |
| 2019 | Amaliya Margaryan | Erik Karapetyan | Ruben Shahinyan | Sona Rubenyan | Tigran Petrosyan | | | |
| 2022 | Vika Martirosyan | Erik Karapetyan | Arshaluys Harutyunyan | Lilit Navasardyan | Srbuk | | | |
| 2023 | Arsen Grigoryan | David Badalyan | Hrach Keshishyan | Sona Rubenyan | Vahagn Gevorgyan | | | |
| 2024 | Aramayis Hayrapetyan | Robert Koloyan | Nare Manukyan | Lilit Arakelyan | Naira Gyurjinyan | | | |
| 2025 | Arthur Manukyan | Simon Hovhannisyan | Kristina Avagimyan | Lilit Navasardyan | Lilit Osipyan | | | |
| 2026 | Erik Karapetyan | Jan Abrahamyan | Nick Egibyan | Rudik Ter-Galstyan | Anahit Adamyan | Anna Grigoryan | Naire Stepanyan | |

=== Commentators and spokespersons ===
| Year | Commentator | Dual commentator | Spokesperson | Ref. |
|---|---|---|---|---|
| 2005 | Unknown | | Did not participate | |
| 2006 | Gohar Gasparyan | Felix Khachatryan | Gohar Gasparyan | |
| 2007 | Gohar Gasparyan | —N/a | Sirusho | |
| 2008 | Felix Khachatryan | Hrachuhi Utmazyan | Hrachuhi Utmazyan | |
| 2009 | Khoren Levonyan | —N/a | Sirusho | |
| 2010 | Khoren Levonyan | Hrachuhi Utmazyan | Nazeni Hovhannisyan | |
| 2011 | Artak Vardanyan | —N/a | Lusine Tovmasyan | |
| 2012 | Gohar Gasparyan | Artur Grigoryan | Did not participate | |
| 2013 | André (semi-finals), Erik Antaranyan (final) | Arevik Udumyan (semi-finals), Anna Avanesyan (final) | André | |
| 2014 | Erik Antaranyan (semi-finals), Tigran Danielyan (final) | Anna Avanesyan (semi-finals), Arevik Udumyan (final) | Anna Avanesyan | |
| 2015 | Erik Antaranyan (semi-final 1), Vahe Khanamiryan (semi-final 2), Avet Barseghyan (final) | Aram Mp3 (semi-final 1), Hermine Stepanyan (semi-final 2), Arevik Udumyan (final) | Lilit Muradyan | |
| 2016 | Avet Barseghyan | —N/a | Arman Margaryan | |
| 2017 | Avet Barseghyan | Gohar Gasparyan | Iveta Mukuchyan | |
| 2018 | Avet Barseghyan | Felix Khachatryan | Arsen Grigoryan | |
| 2019 | Avet Barseghyan | Aram Mp3 | Aram Mp3 | |
| 2021 | No television broadcast | | Did not participate | |
| 2022 | Hrachuhi Utmazyan | Garik Papoyan | Garik Papoyan | |
| 2023 | Hrachuhi Utmazyan | Hamlet Arakelyan | Maléna | |
| 2024 | Hrachuhi Utmazyan | Sevak Hakobyan | Brunette | |
| 2025 | Hrachuhi Utmazyan | Hamlet Arakelyan | Lusine Tovmasyan | |
| 2026 | Hrachuhi Utmazyan | Hamlet Arakelyan | Parg | |

==== Other shows ====
| Show | Commentators | Channel | Ref. |
|---|---|---|---|
| Eurovision: Europe Shine a Light | David Tserunyan and Emma Hakobyan | AMPTV | |

== Photo gallery ==
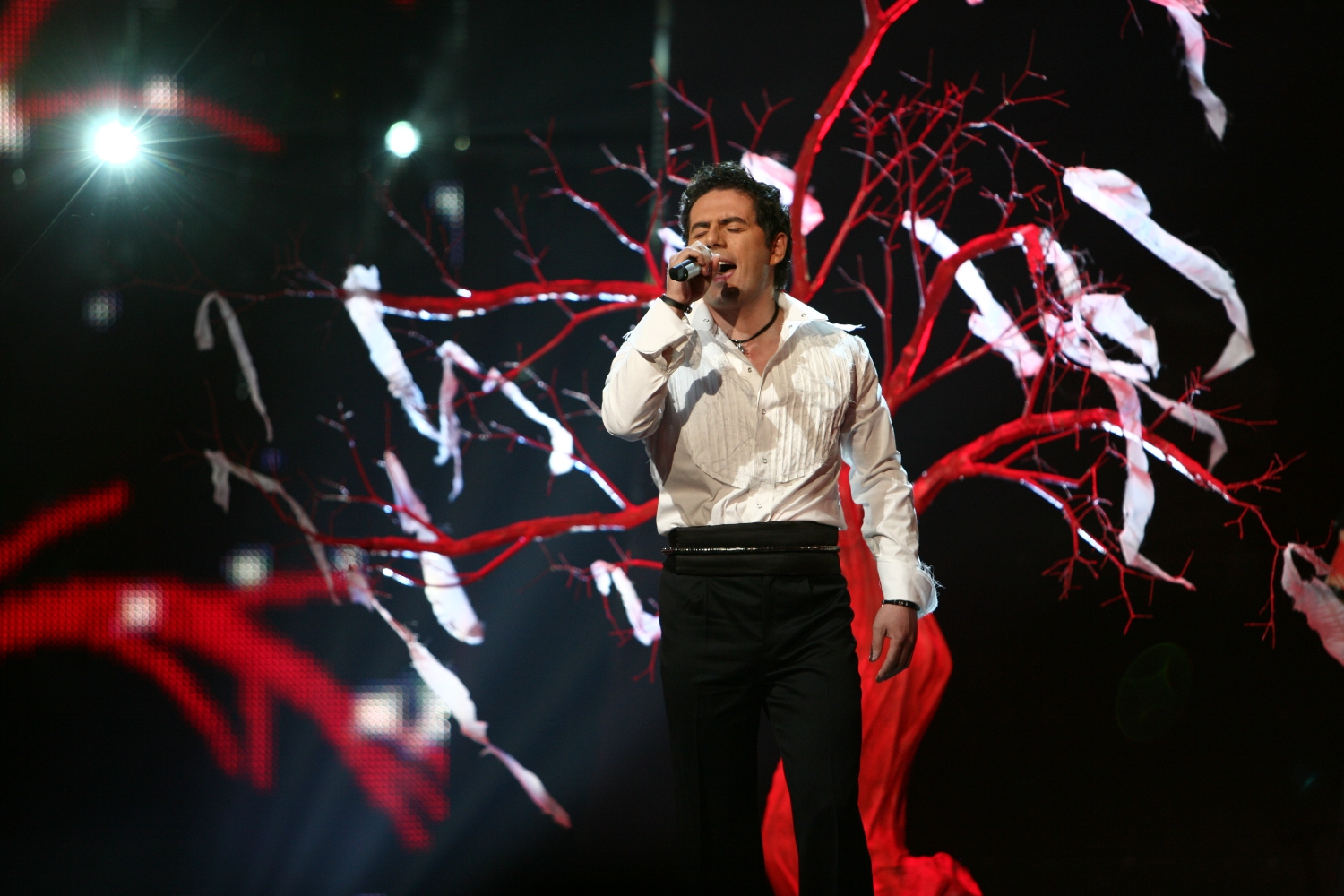
Hayko performing "Anytime You Need" in Helsinki (2007)

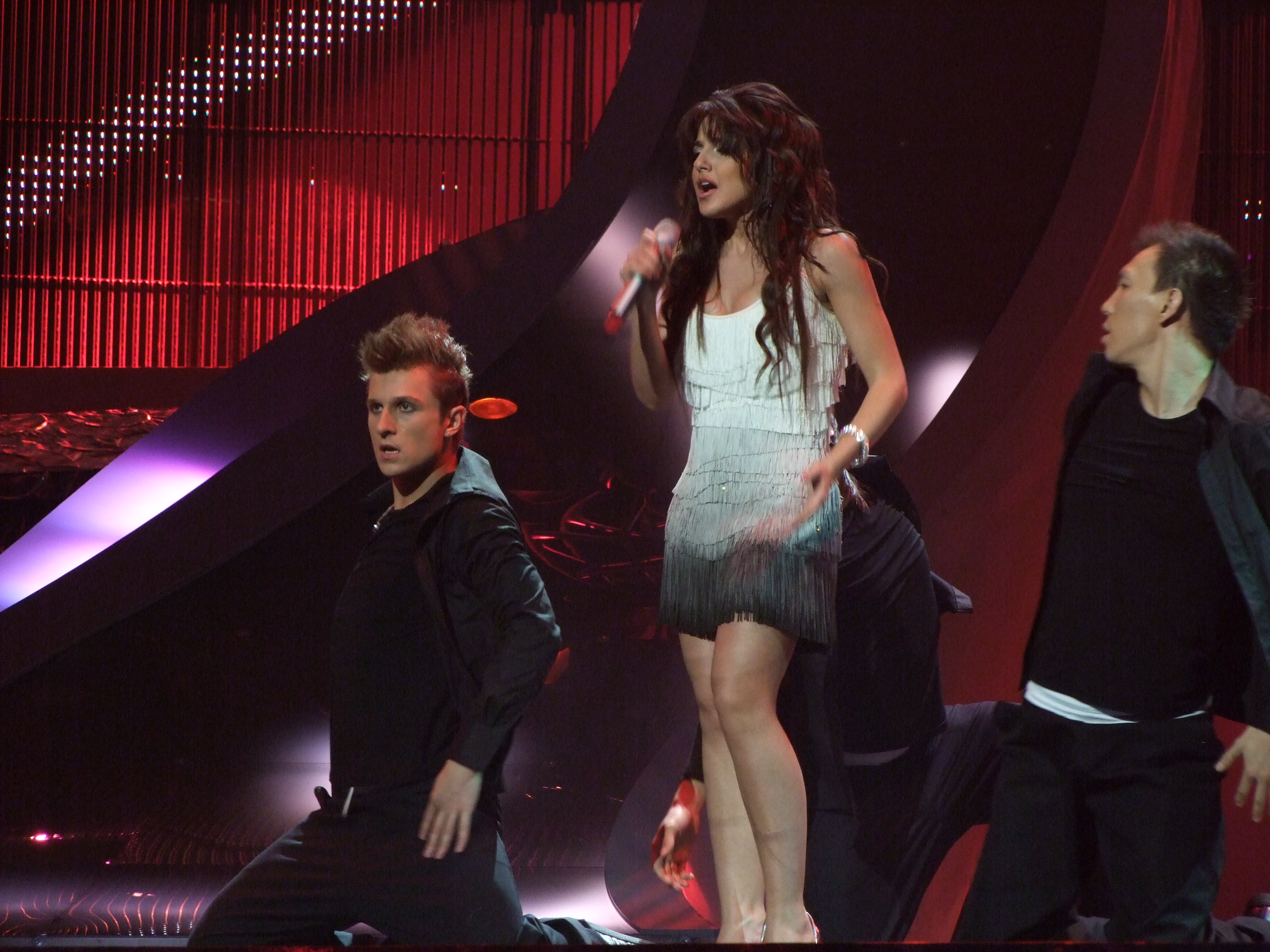
Sirusho performing "Qélé, Qélé" in Belgrade (2008)

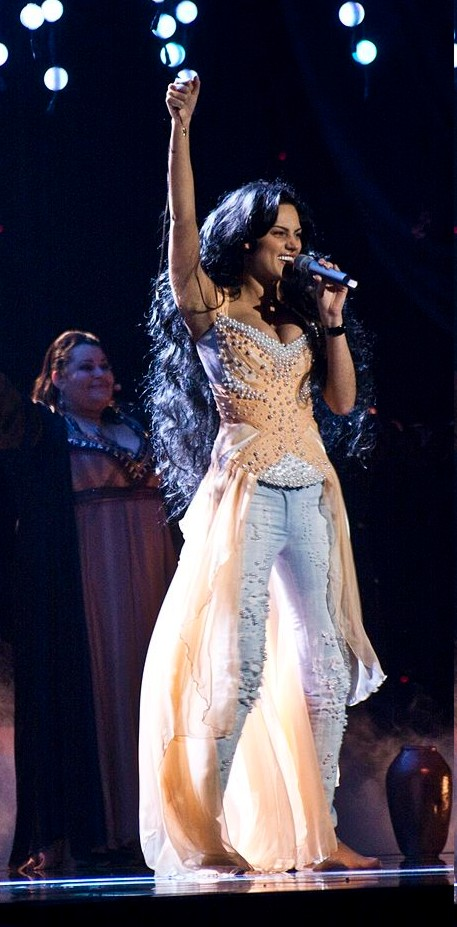
Eva Rivas performing "Apricot Stone" in Oslo (2010)

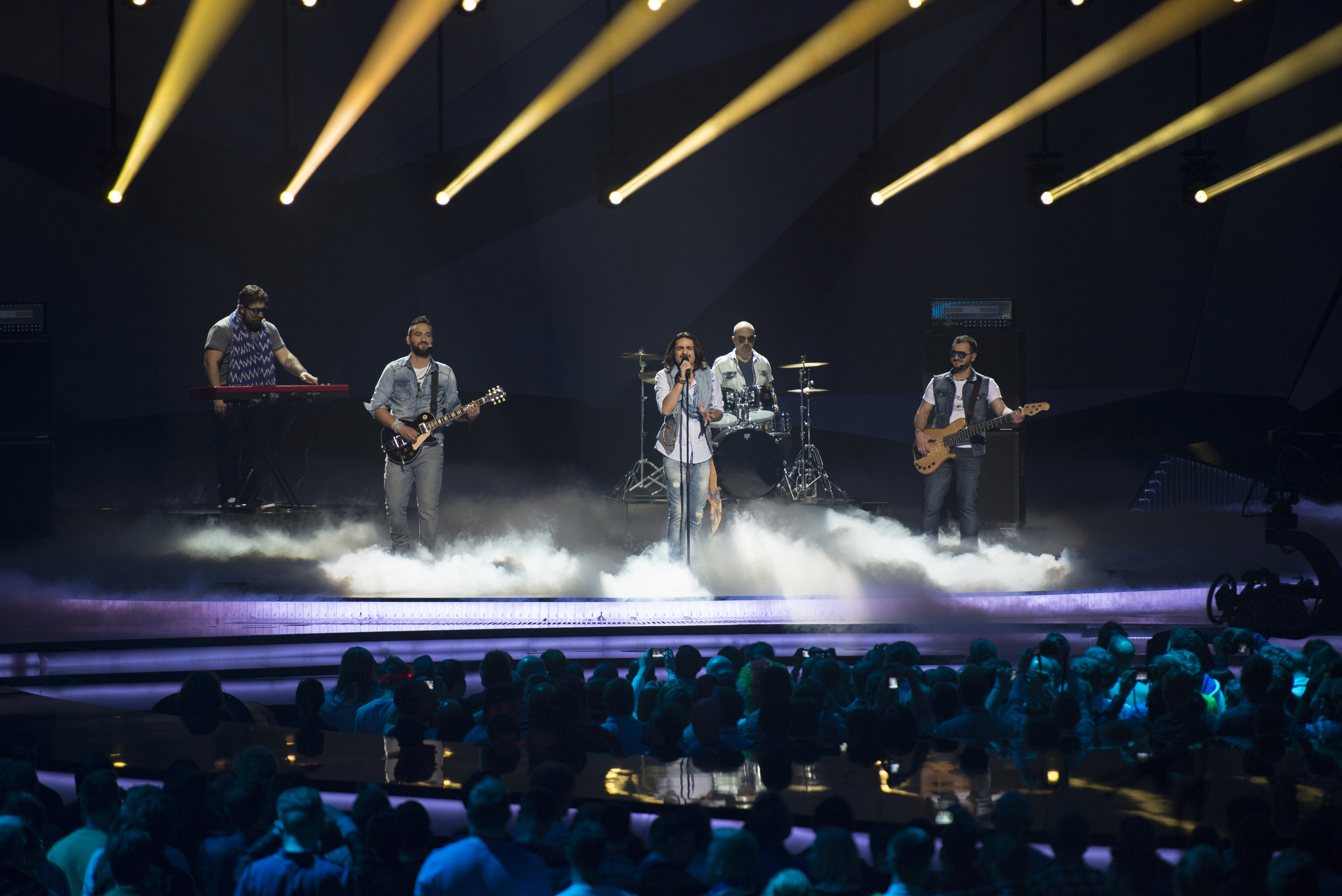
Dorians performing "Lonely Planet" in Malmö (2013)

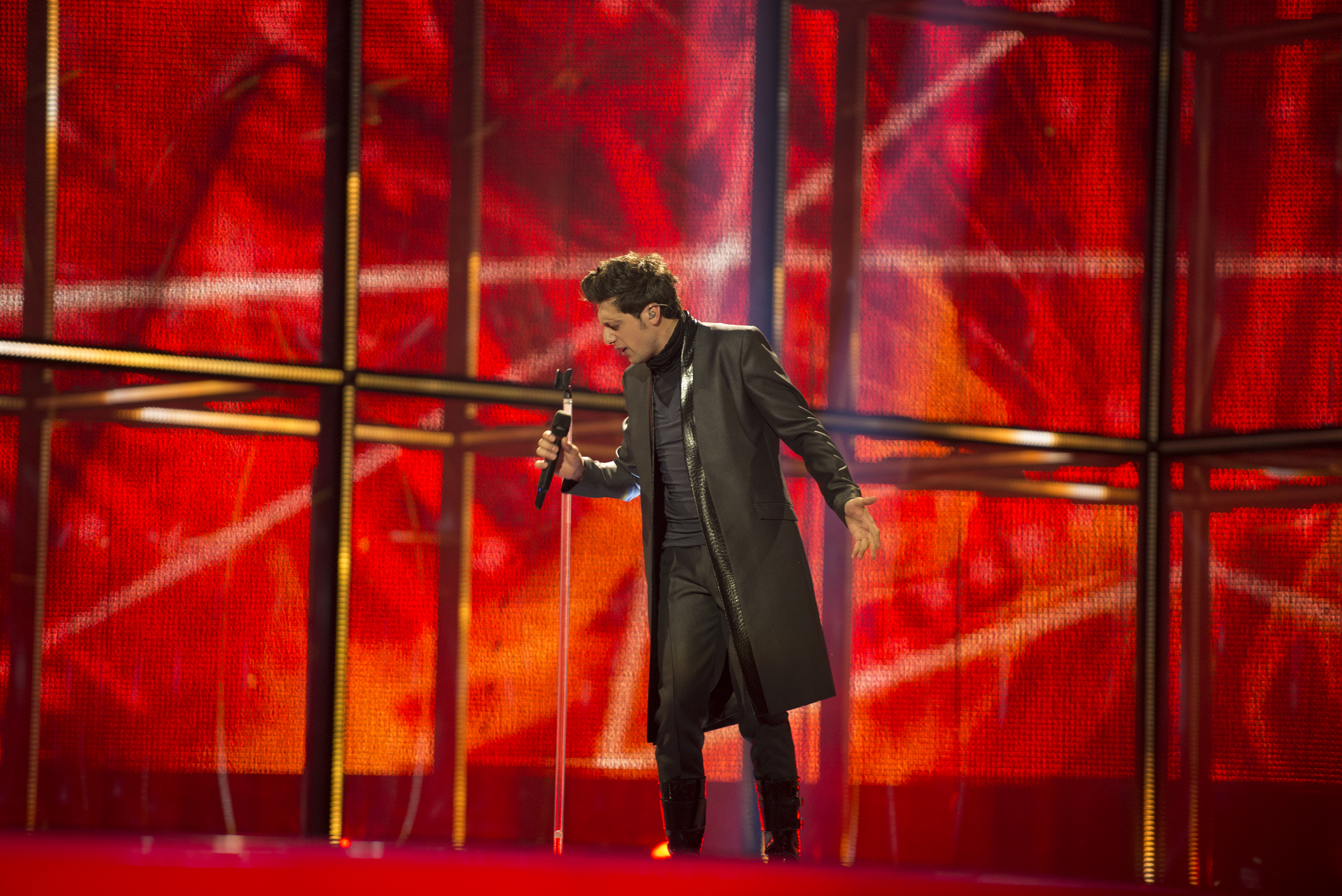
Aram Mp3 performing "Not Alone" in Copenhagen (2014)

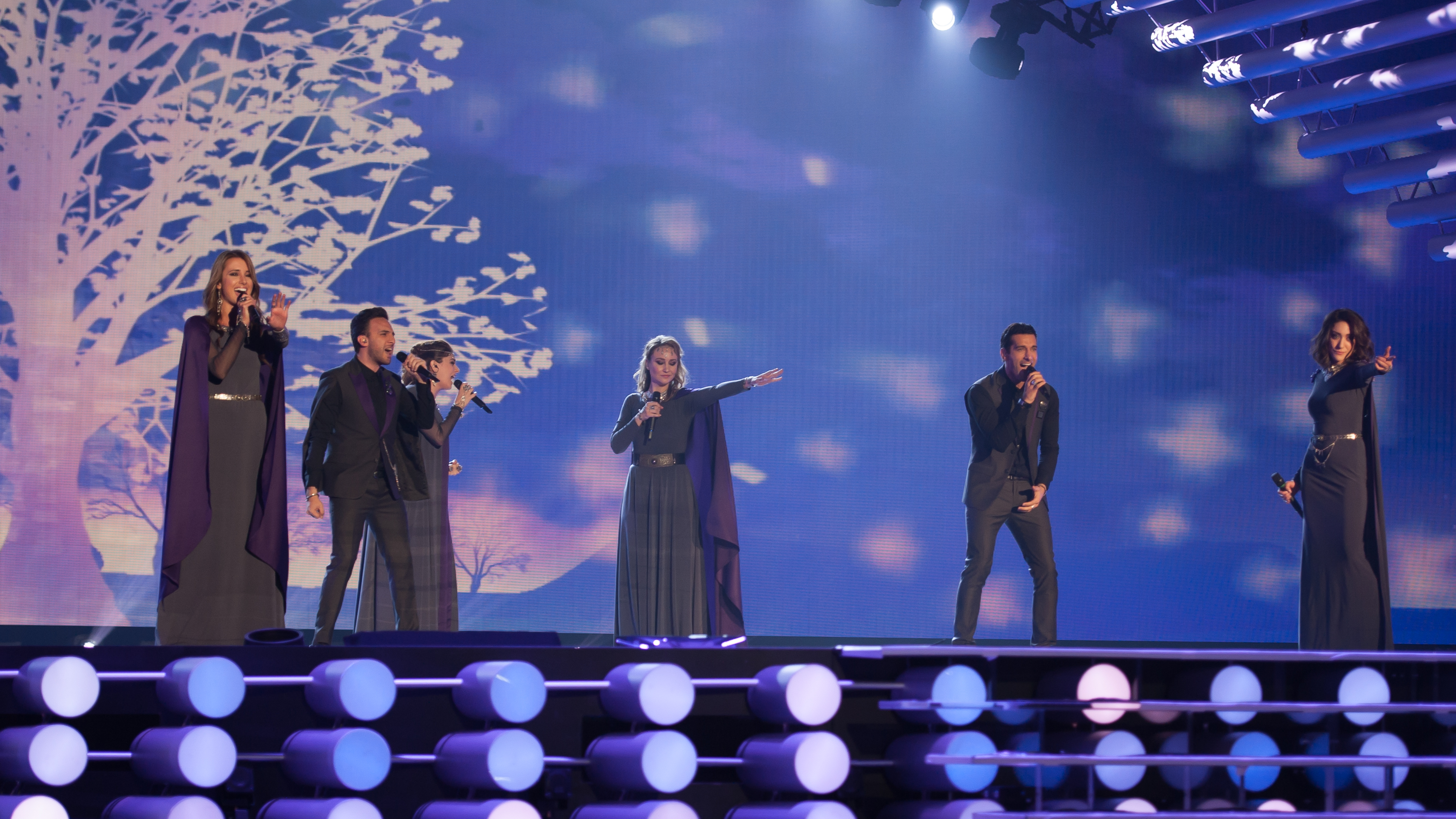
Genealogy performing "Face the Shadow" in Vienna (2015)

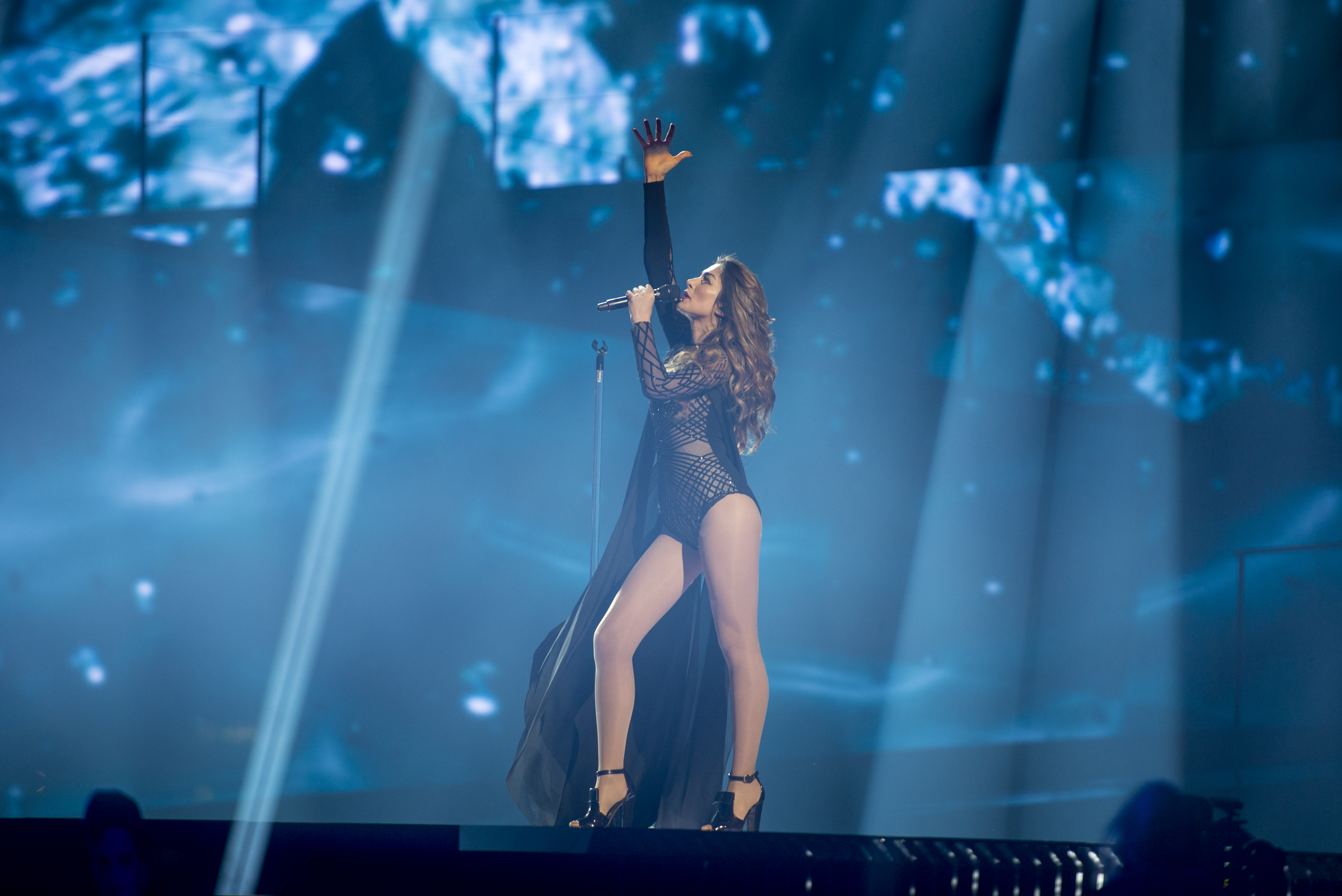
Iveta Mukuchyan performing "LoveWave" in Stockholm (2016)

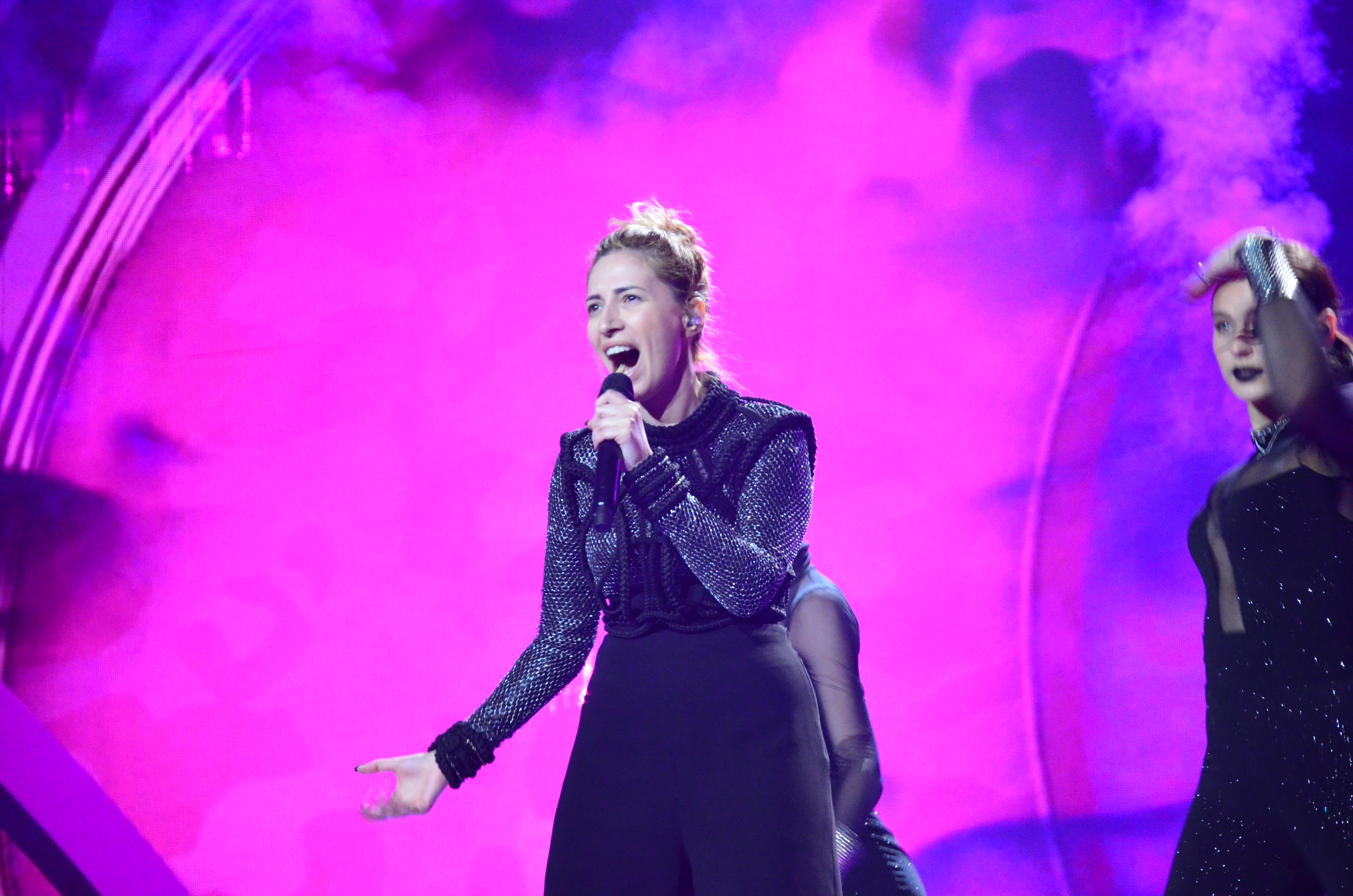
Artsvik performing "Fly with Me" in Kyiv (2017)

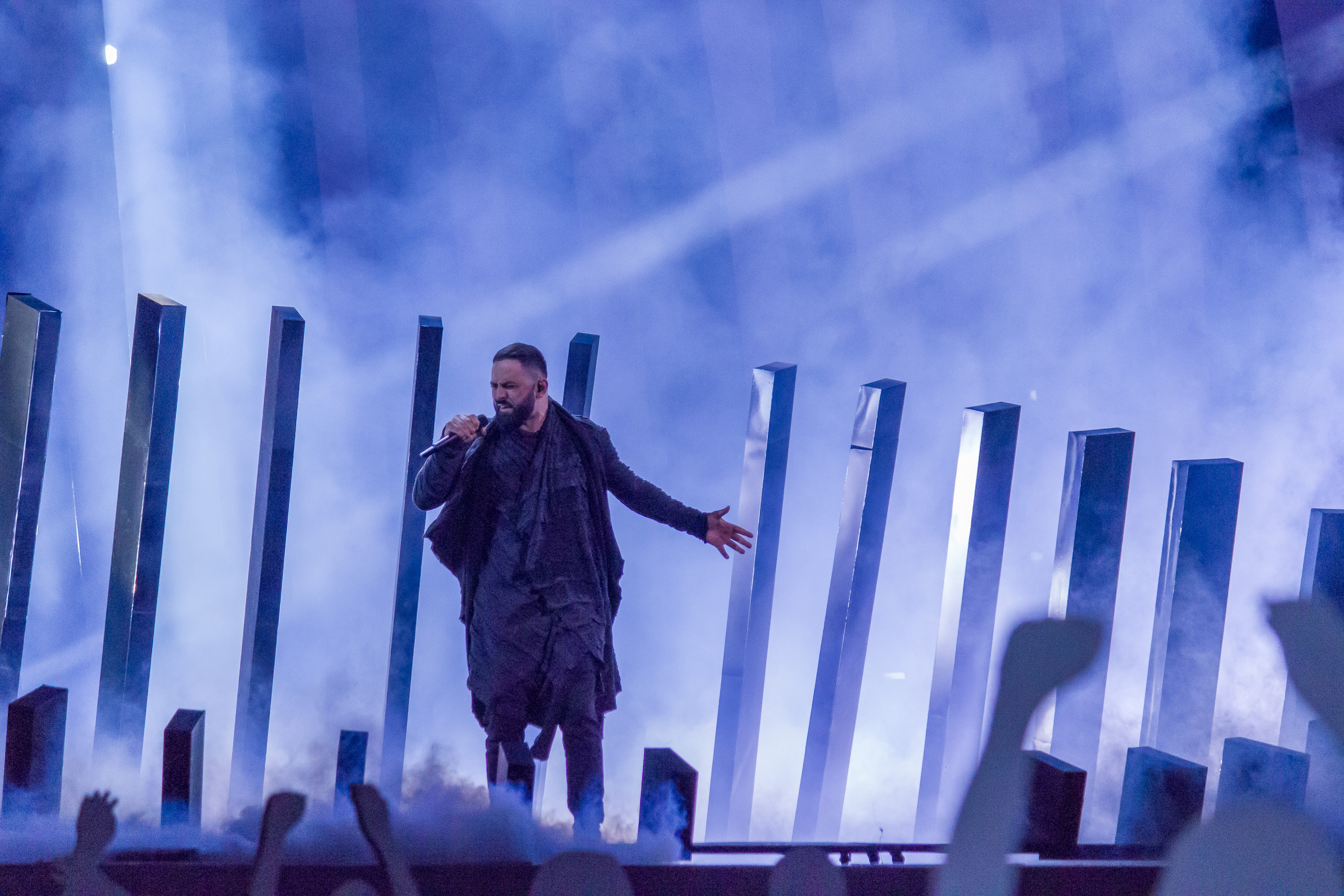
Sevak Khanagyan performing "Qami" in Lisbon (2018)

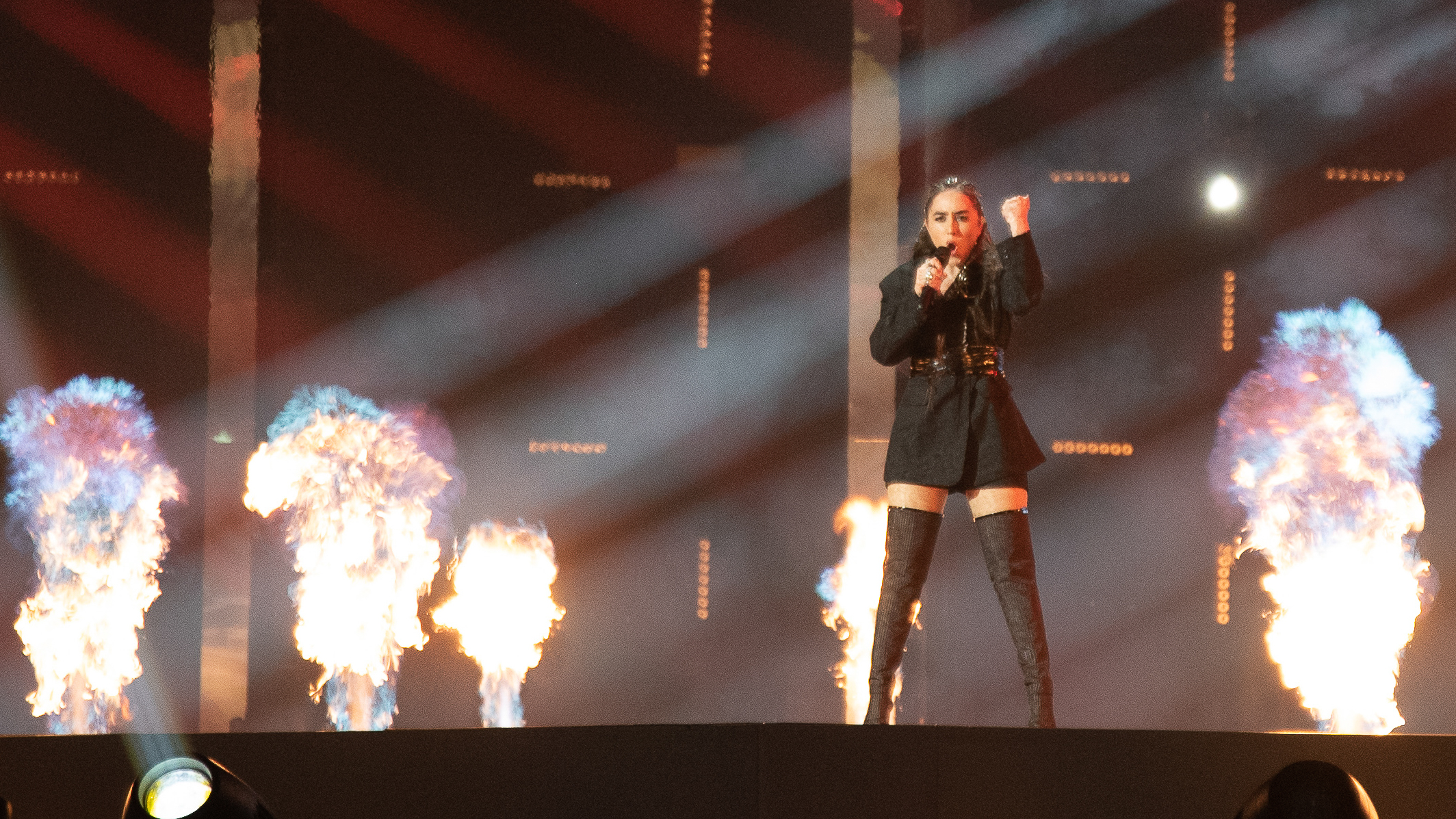
Srbuk performing "Walking Out" in Tel Aviv (2019)

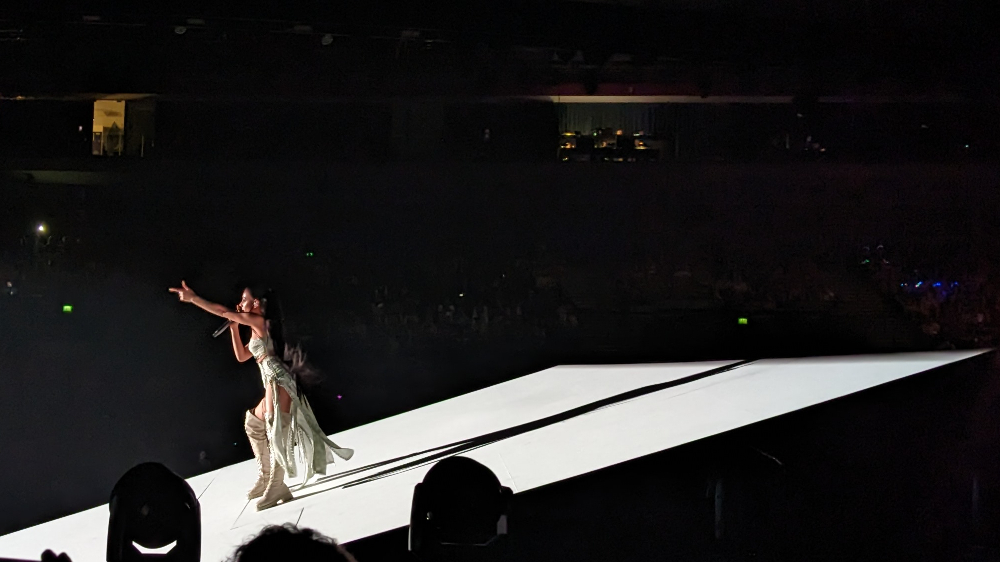
Brunette performing "Future Lover" in Liverpool (2023)

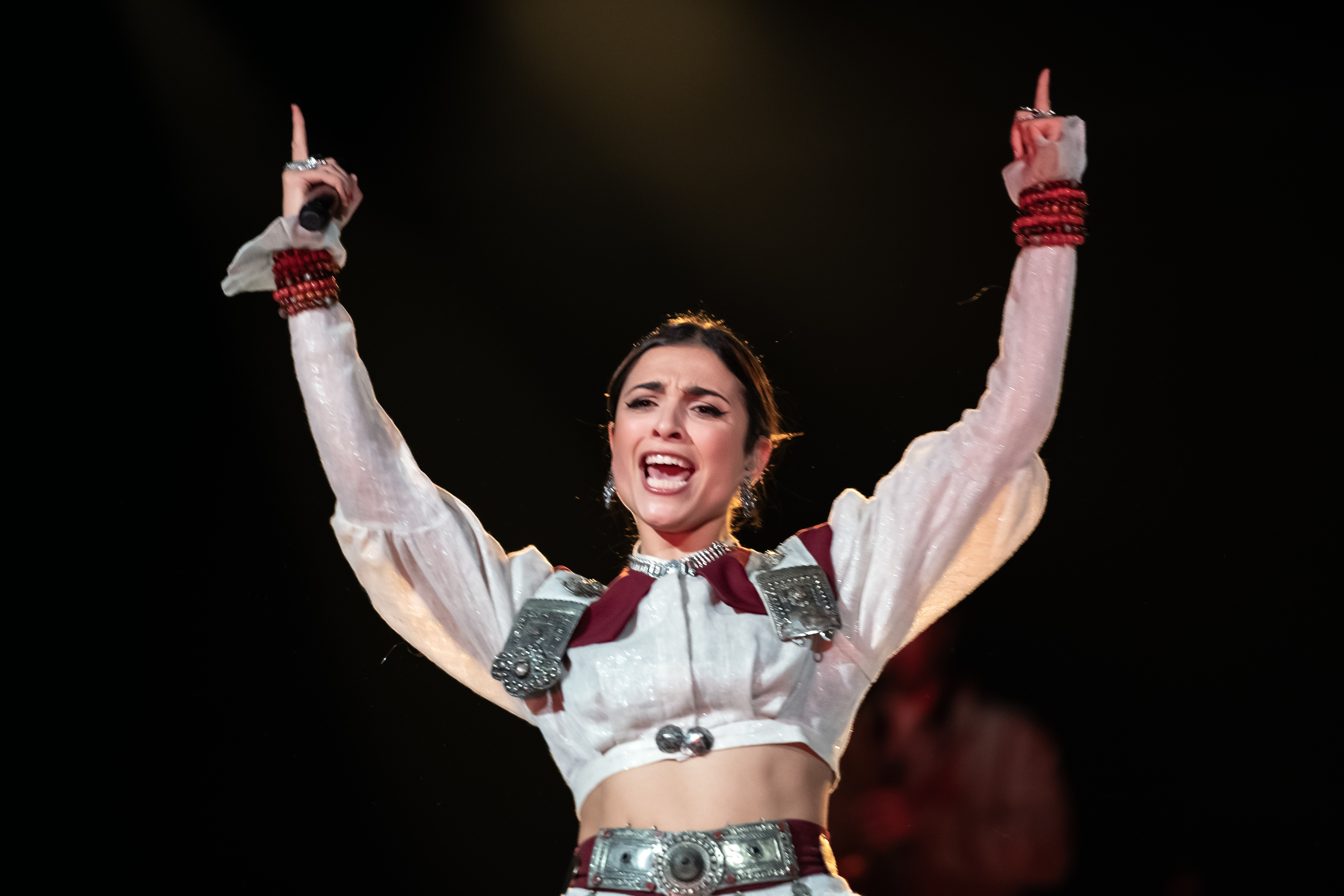
Ladaniva performing "Jako" in Malmö (2024)

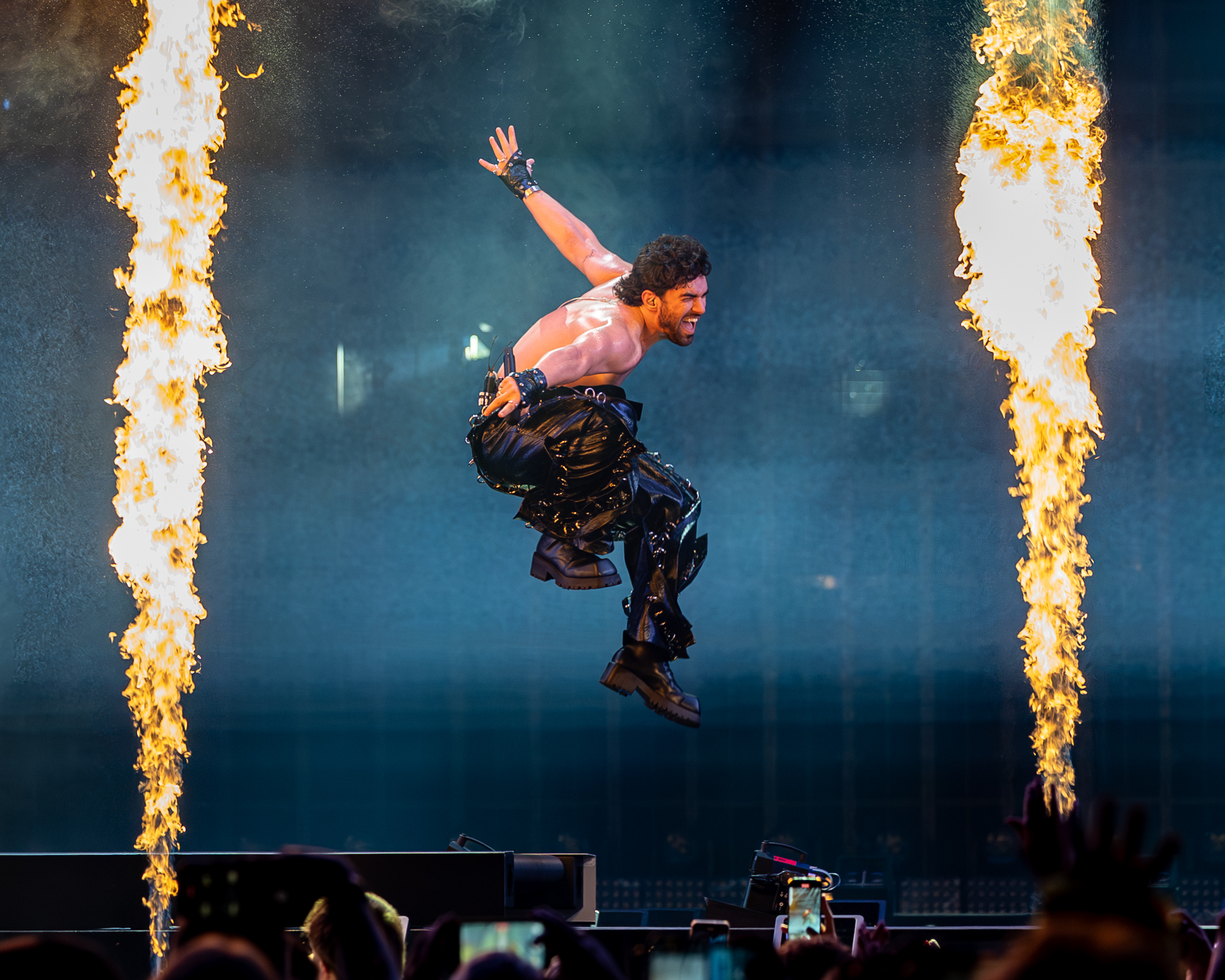
Parg performing "Survivor" in Basel (2025)

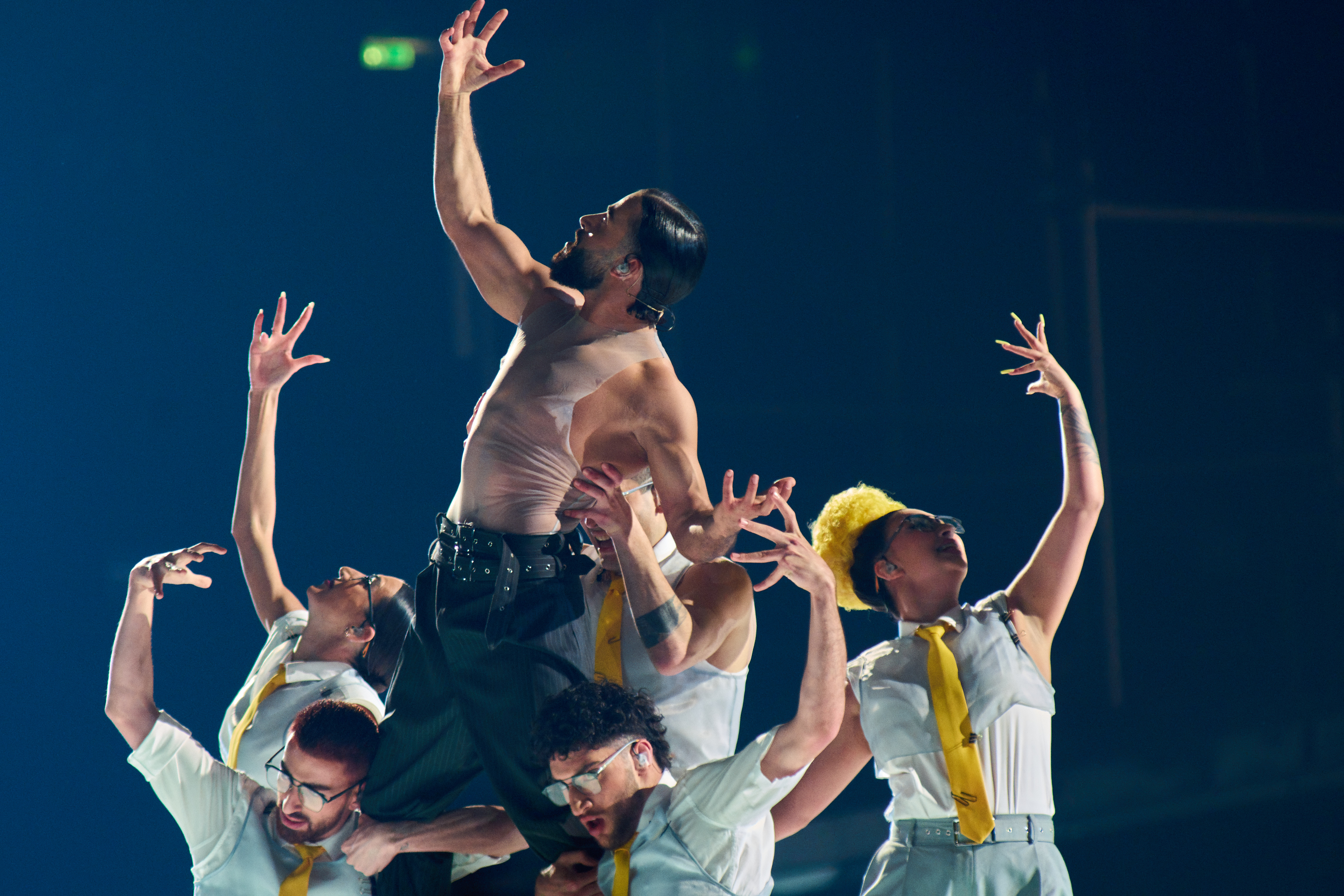
Simón performing "Paloma Rumba" in Vienna (2026)

== See also ==
- Armenia–Azerbaijan relations in the Eurovision Song Contest – Relations between the two countries in the Junior and Senior Eurovision Song Contests.
- Armenia in the Junior Eurovision Song Contest – Junior version of the Eurovision Song Contest.
- Armenia in the Eurovision Young Dancers – A competition organised by the EBU for younger dancers aged between 16 and 21.
- Armenia in the Eurovision Young Musicians – A competition organised by the EBU for musicians aged 18 years and younger.
