= Snap (song) =

2022 song by Rosa Linn

Single by Rosa Linn

from the EP Lay Your Hands Upon My Heart
- Released: 19 March 2022
- Genre: Pop; folk-pop
- Length: 3:00
- Label: Nvak Collective
- Songwriters: Rosa Linn; Allie Crystal; Larzz Principato; Kinetics; Tamar Kaprelian; Courtney Harrell

Rosa Linn singles chronology
"King" (2021)	"Snap" (2022)	"WDIA (Would Do It Again)" (2022)

Music video
- "Snap" on YouTube "Snap" (Alternative Video) on YouTube

Eurovision Song Contest 2022 entry
- Country: Armenia
- Artist: Rosa Linn
- Language: English
- Composers: Rosa Linn; Larzz Principato; Kinetics; Allie Crystal; Tamar Kaprelian; Courtney Harrell
- Lyricists: Rosa Linn; Larzz Principato; Kinetics; Allie Crystal; Tamar Kaprelian; Courtney Harrell

Finals performance
- Semi-final result: 5th
- Semi-final points: 187
- Final result: 20th
- Final points: 61

Entry chronology
- ◄ "Chains on You" (2020)
- "Future Lover" (2023) ►

Official performance video
- "Snap" (First semi-final) on YouTube "Snap" (Grand Final) on YouTube

"Snap" is a song by Armenian singer Rosa Linn written and composed by Linn, with Larzz Principato, Allie Crystal, Kinetics, Courtney Harrell, and Tamar Kaprelian, and released on 19 March 2022. It represented Armenia in the Eurovision Song Contest 2022, where it finished in 20th place with 61 points.

Following the contest, the song went viral on video sharing service TikTok. "Snap" reached the top of the charts in Belgium, and the top ten in Austria, France, Germany, Iceland, Ireland, Italy, Netherlands, Norway, Sweden and Switzerland. The song also reached the charts in 23 other music markets, including peaking at number 21 on the UK Singles Chart, making Rosa Linn the highest-charting foreign act from Eurovision 2022 in the UK. It also debuted on the US Billboard Hot 100 at number 97 and later peaked at number 67, becoming the second Eurovision song of the 21st century to enter the chart. As of May 2026, the song is the second most streamed Eurovision entry on Spotify, behind Duncan Laurence's Arcade. The song was later included in Rosa Linn's debut extended play Lay Your Hands Upon My Heart (2023).

== Background ==
=== Conception ===
"Snap" was co-written by Rosa Linn, Larzz Principato, Courtney Harrell, Kinetics, Allie Crystal and Tamar Kaprelian, with production handled by Alex Salibian, Ethan Schneiderman, Larzz Principato, Ben Samama, and Lilith Navasardyan. The writing sessions for "Snap" took place in-between Los Angeles and Yerevan.

In an interview for Wiwibloggs, Rosa Linn stated that this song is a personal story everyone can relate to: "I think we've all been at a snapping point, where it felt like there's no way out and that the entire world is just crumbling down around you. You start questioning everything, including yourself. I have been there. And what I realized was that I had the strength to shape my reality – it just took getting out of my own way and finding inner-peace.

=== Internal Selection ===
The Public Television Company of Armenia (AMPTV) used an internal selection to determine its entrant for the 66th edition of the Eurovision Song Contest. The candidates rumoured to be in the running were Athena Manoukian, Saro Gevorgyan, Kamil Show, and Rosa Linn. On 15 February 2022, AMPTV dismissed claims that Rosa Linn had already been selected, stating that no decision had been made yet and that an announcement would come in March. On 4 March, it was reported in several Armenian media outlets that two singers were in the running to represent Armenia: Rosa Linn and Saro Gevorgyan. AMPTV announced Rosa Linn as the Armenian entrant for Eurovision on 11 March 2022. Her entry "Snap" was officially released on 19 March 2022, but a snippet of the song was leaked a week earlier.

=== Promotion ===
Rosa Linn made appearances across Europe to promote "Snap" as the Armenian Eurovision entry. On 7 April, Linn performed during the Israel Calling event held at the Menora Mivtachim Arena in Tel Aviv, Israel. On 9 April, Linn performed during the Eurovision in Concert event which was held at the AFAS Live venue in Amsterdam, Netherlands. In addition to her international appearances, Rosa Linn recorded her 'live-on-tape' performance in Sofia, Bulgaria on 19 March. This would have been used in the event that she was unable to travel to Turin, or subjected to quarantine on arrival.

=== Eurovision ===
On 10 May 2022, the first semi-final of the Eurovision Song Contest was held at the PalaOlimpico in Turin hosted by Radiotelevisione italiana (RAI) and broadcast live throughout the continent and abroad. Linn performed "Snap" seventeenth and last, and qualified for the grand final. Armenia qualified for the final for the first time since 2017.

The "Snap" performance featured Linn alone on stage in a house-like structure made out of paper, representing the overflow of emotions she felt when writing the song. Over the course of the performance, she tore down several parts of the walls to reveal statements about the song. At the climax of the performance, the house rotated and she tore down an entire circle of the wall to face the audience in an intimate performance. The majority of the Armenian performance was warmly lit with golden LED lights on stage. It was staged by Dan Shipton and Marvin Dietmann.

On 14 May 2022, Linn performed again "Snap" eighth in a field of twenty-six in the grand final of the Eurovision Song Contest. At the end of the contest, the song placed twentieth with 61 points.

== Music videos ==
The music video for "Snap", filmed in Yerevan and directed by Aramayis Hayrapetyan, was released on 19 March 2022. Hayrapetyan stated that "[o]nce I heard “Snap”, I kept thinking that I had to show the artist's emotions as comprehensibly and correctly as possible. Not leaving the artist in the background was an important precondition for me. We made the video for the purpose of giving the viewers a chance to travel to another, extraordinary reality through artistic and visual solutions". This video shows Linn traveling through the sky while singing and playing the guitar on the porch of a floating house. She then lands in the middle of an urban setting and finds a note on the ground containing the song's lyrics.

A second music video, filmed in the United States and directed by Dano Cerny, was released on 7 October 2022. It shows Linn singing the song from the back seat of a car without a driver; halfway through the video she stops at a roadside diner where the lights begin to flicker. The vehicle used in it also features in the music video for Regard's 2019 cover of "Ride It".

== Commercial performance ==
A few months after Eurovision, "Snap" went viral on video sharing service TikTok, leading to an increase of streams on Spotify and topping the daily viral charts in various countries. "Snap" started entering numerous countries' national charts, surpassing the winning song, from Ukraine, for the most chart entries by a Eurovision song from 2022.

The song has topped the chart in both regions of Belgium as well as in Latvia and the top ten in Austria, France, Germany, Ireland, Israel, Italy, Netherlands, Norway, Slovakia, Sweden and Switzerland. In the United Kingdom, the song peaked at number 21 on the UK Singles Chart, making Rosa Linn the highest-charting foreign act from Eurovision 2022 in the UK. "Snap" debuted on the US Billboard Hot 100 at number 97, later peaking at number 67, and spent four weeks at number 1 on the Adult Alternative Airplay chart.

As of May 2024, "Snap" has reached a billion streams on Spotify, becoming the second song from the contest to do so after "Arcade" by Duncan Laurence. It is also the fastest Eurovision song to reach a billion streams on the platform and is the most streamed entry by a non-winner.

== Charts ==
=== Weekly charts ===
Weekly chart performance for "Snap"
Chart (2022–2024)	Peak position
Australia (ARIA)	20
Australia Airplay (RCS)	7
Austria (Ö3 Austria Top 40)	5
Austria Airplay (IFPI)	1
Belarus Airplay (TopHit)	29
Belgium (Ultratop 50 Flanders)	1
Belgium (Ultratop 50 Wallonia)	1
Brazil Airplay (Top 100 Brasil)	60
Canada (Canadian Hot 100)	29
Canada AC (Billboard)	12
Canada CHR/Top 40 (Billboard)	32
Canada Hot AC (Billboard)	16
CIS Airplay (TopHit)	10
Croatia (Billboard)	22
Croatia International Airplay (Top lista)	5
Czech Republic Airplay (ČNS IFPI)	16
Czech Republic Singles Digital (ČNS IFPI)	16
Denmark (Tracklisten)	30
Denmark Airplay (Tracklisten)	1
Estonia Airplay (TopHit)	52
Finland (Suomen virallinen lista)	20
Finland Airplay (Radiosoittolista)	1
France (SNEP)	10
France Airplay (SNEP)	1
Germany (GfK)	8
Germany Airplay (MusicTrace)	6
Global 200 (Billboard)	18
Greece International (IFPI)	20
Hungary (Rádiós Top 40)	36
Hungary (Single Top 40)	24
Hungary (Stream Top 40)	29
Iceland (Tónlistinn)	7
Indonesia (Billboard)	15
Ireland (IRMA)	6
Israel International Airplay (Media Forest)	3
Italy (FIMI)	6
Italy Airplay (EarOne)	9
Kazakhstan Airplay (TopHit)	14
Lebanon (Lebanese Top 20)	11
Lithuania (AGATA)	21
Lithuania Airplay (TopHit)	60
Luxembourg (Billboard)	14
Malaysia (Billboard)	22
Netherlands (Dutch Top 40)	2
Netherlands (Single Top 100)	4
Netherlands Airplay (Dutch Charts)	1
New Zealand (Recorded Music NZ)	30
New Zealand Airplay (RCS)	7
Norway (VG-lista)	8
Norway Airplay (IFPI)	34
Poland Airplay (ZPAV)	3
Poland Streaming (OLiS)	58
Portugal (AFP)	16
Portugal Airplay (AFP)	1
Romania Airplay (UPFR)	4
Romania Airplay (Media Forest)	5
Romania TV Airplay (Media Forest)	2
Russia Airplay (TopHit)	21
San Marino Airplay (SMRTV Top 50) version with Alfa	43
Singapore (RIAS)	17
Slovakia Airplay (ČNS IFPI)	2
Slovakia Singles Digital (ČNS IFPI)	16
South Africa Streaming (TOSAC)	37
Spain (Promusicae)	51
Spain Airplay (Promusicae)	2
Sweden (Sverigetopplistan)	8
Sweden Airplay (Radiomonitor)	2
Switzerland (Schweizer Hitparade)	3
Switzerland Airplay (MusicTrace)	1
Ukraine Airplay (TopHit)	17
UK Singles (Official Charts)	21
UK Independent (Official Charts)	1
US Billboard Hot 100	67
US Adult Contemporary (Billboard)	27
US Adult Top 40 (Billboard)	11
US Hot Rock & Alternative Songs (Billboard)	9
US Mainstream Top 40 (Billboard)	17
US Rock & Alternative Airplay (Billboard)	8

2025–2026 weekly chart performance for "Snap"
Chart (2025–2026)	Peak position
CIS Airplay (TopHit)	104
Estonia Airplay (TopHit)	105
Russia Airplay (TopHit)	110
Ukraine Airplay (TopHit)	42

=== Monthly charts ===
Monthly chart performance for "Snap"
Chart (2022–2024)	Peak position
Belarus Airplay (TopHit)	30
CIS Airplay (TopHit)	10
Estonia Airplay (TopHit)	79
Kazakhstan Airplay (TopHit)	32
Lithuania Airplay (TopHit)	69
Romania Airplay (TopHit)	4
Russia Airplay (TopHit)	32
Ukraine Airplay (TopHit)	16

=== Year-end charts ===
2022 year-end chart performance for "Snap"
Chart (2022)	Position
Australia (ARIA)	84
Austria (Ö3 Austria Top 40)	36
Belgium (Ultratop 50 Flanders)	13
Belgium (Ultratop 50 Wallonia)	36
CIS Airplay (TopHit)	102
Germany (Official German Charts)	40
Global 200 (Billboard)	133
Italy (FIMI)	52
Lithuania (AGATA)	79
Netherlands (Dutch Top 40)	6
Netherlands (Single Top 100)	22
Poland (ZPAV)	44
Sweden (Sverigetopplistan)	36
Switzerland (Schweizer Hitparade)	18

2023 year-end chart performance for "Snap"
Chart (2023)	Position
Austria (Ö3 Austria Top 40)	19
Belarus Airplay (TopHit)	110
Belgium (Ultratop 50 Flanders)	21
Belgium (Ultratop 50 Wallonia)	26
CIS Airplay (TopHit)	53
Estonia Airplay (TopHit)	62
Germany (Official German Charts)	33
Global 200 (Billboard)	73
Italy (FIMI)	45
Netherlands (Single Top 100)	87
Poland (Polish Airplay Top 100)	53
Romania Airplay (TopHit)	15
Switzerland (Schweizer Hitparade)	10
US Adult Top 40 (Billboard)	39
US Hot Rock & Alternative Songs (Billboard)	45
US Rock Airplay (Billboard)	23

2024 year-end chart performance for "Snap"
Chart (2024)	Position
CIS Airplay (TopHit)	192
Romania Airplay (TopHit)	106

2025 year-end chart performance for "Snap"
Chart (2025)	Position
Estonia Airplay (TopHit)	180
Romania Airplay (TopHit)	131

=== Certifications ===
Certifications and sales for "Snap"
Region	Certification	Certified units/sales
Austria (IFPI Austria)	2× Platinum	60,000^{‡}
Brazil (Pro-Música Brasil)	2× Diamond	320,000^{‡}
Canada (Music Canada)	Platinum	80,000^{‡}
Denmark (IFPI Danmark)	Platinum	90,000^{‡}
France (SNEP)	Diamond	333,333^{‡}
Germany (BVMI)	Platinum	400,000^{‡}
Hungary (MAHASZ)	2× Platinum	8,000^{‡}
Italy (FIMI)	4× Platinum	400,000^{‡}
New Zealand (RMNZ)	2× Platinum	60,000^{‡}
Norway (IFPI Norway)	2× Platinum	120,000^{‡}
Poland (ZPAV)	2× Platinum	100,000^{‡}
Portugal (AFP)	3× Platinum	30,000^{‡}
Spain (Promusicae)	3× Platinum	180,000^{‡}
Switzerland (IFPI Switzerland)	3× Platinum	60,000^{‡}
United Kingdom (BPI)	Platinum	600,000^{‡}
United States (RIAA)	Platinum	1,000,000^{‡}
Streaming
Greece (IFPI Greece)	Gold	1,000,000^{†}
Sweden (GLF)	Platinum	8,000,000^{†}
^{‡} Sales+streaming figures based on certification alone.^{†} Streaming-only figures based on certification alone.

== Release history ==
Release dates and formats for "Snap"
Region	Date	Format(s)	Version	Label(s)	Ref.
Various	19 March 2022	Digital download; streaming	Original	Nvak Collective; Columbia	
Italy	3 June 2022	Radio airplay	Original	Columbia	
United States	22 August 2022	Hot adult contemporary	Original	Columbia	
United States	23 August 2022	Contemporary hit radio	Original	Columbia	
Various	15 July 2022	Digital download; streaming	Snap Pack EP	Nvak Collective; Columbia	

== In popular culture ==
In 2023, the song was played during an episode of the first season of Shrinking. Also in 2023, it was included in the soundtrack of the Brazilian telenovela Terra e Paixão.
