= Rosa Linn =

Armenian musician (born 2000)

Rosa Linn Ռոզա Լին
- Born: Roza Kostandyan; 28 November 2000 (age 25); Vanadzor, Armenia
- Genres: Pop; folk-pop
- Occupation: Singer-songwriter
- Instruments: Vocals; guitar; piano
- Years active: 2013–present
- Labels: Columbia; Nvak
- Website: rosalinnofficial.com

Roza Kostandyan (Armenian: Ռոզա Կոստանդյան; born 28 November 2000), known professionally as Rosa Linn (Armenian: Ռոզա Լին), is an Armenian singer-songwriter. She started her career getting signed by Nvak Collective and releasing her debut single "King" with Kiiara in 2021. In 2022, Linn represented her country in the Eurovision Song Contest 2022 in Turin, Italy with the song "Snap" and finished in 20th place. Following the contest, the song went viral on TikTok and charted globally, earning her a recording contract with Columbia Records. Her debut EP, Lay Your Hands Upon My Heart, was released on 22 June 2023.

== Life and career ==
=== 2000–2021: Early life and career beginnings ===
Kostandyan was born in Vanadzor, Armenia. She began playing the piano at the age of six and at the ages of 11 to 12 started songwriting. Kostandyan is also highly involved with writing and producing her own music. In 2013, she participated in the Armenian national selection for the Junior Eurovision Song Contest with the song "Gitem". As a teenager in 2018, she lived in the United States for a year as an exchange student with the US Government funded Future Leaders Exchange Program (FLEX), residing in the state of Wisconsin.

Rosa Linn started her professional musical career after signing a recording contract with US-based record label Nvak Collective, founded by Alex Salibian and Tamar Kaprelian. In September 2021, Rosa Linn released her debut single "King" in collaboration with American singer Kiiara. She made her television debut performance of the song during the morning show on Public Television Company of Armenia (AMPTV) in November 2021.

=== 2022–present: Eurovision Song Contest and debut EP ===
In February 2022, Rosa Linn was rumoured to be representing Armenia in the Eurovision Song Contest 2022 in Turin, Italy. On 11 March, she was announced as the Armenian representative by AMPTV. Her Eurovision entry, titled "Snap", was released on 19 March alongside its music video. The song was written by Rosa Linn along with Tamar Kaprelian, Larzz Principato, Jeremy Dusoulet, Allie Crystal, and Courtney Harrell. Rosa Linn performed "Snap" on 10 May during the first semi-final of the contest, and qualified for the final. She performed the song once again in the final on 14 May and placed 20th.

Following the contest, "Snap" went viral on TikTok and entered numerous countries' national charts; reaching the top of the charts in the Flanders region of Belgium and the top ten in Austria, Netherlands, Ireland, Norway, Sweden and Switzerland. In August 2022, she signed a recording contract with Columbia Records. In October 2022, Linn was confirmed to be an opening act for Ed Sheeran on the North American leg of his +–=÷x Tour between June and July 2023. In the same month, she released a new music video for "Snap", filmed in the United States; and a collaborative single titled "WDIA (Would Do It Again)" with Dutch singer Duncan Laurence. On 31 October, she made her US television debut on The Late Late Show with James Corden, where she performed "Snap" with arrangement by musicians using Armenian traditional instruments. Linn performed "Snap" as an interval act for the Junior Eurovision Song Contest 2022, which took place on 11 December in Yerevan. She also wrote the common song for the contest, "Spin the Magic", performed by Maléna. In June 2023, she released her debut EP, titled Lay Your Hands Upon My Heart.

Linn was credited as a co-writer of Paloma Rumba, Armenia's entry at the Eurovision Song Contest 2026 performed by Simón.

== Discography ==
=== Extended plays ===
Title	Details
Lay Your Hands Upon My Heart	Released: 23 June 2023; Label: Nvak Collective; Formats: Digital download, streaming

=== Singles ===
==== As lead artist ====
List of singles as lead artist, with selected chart positions and certifications, showing year released and album name
Title	Year	Peak chart positions										Certifications	Album
Title	Year	AUS	CAN	GER	IRE	ITA	NLD	NOR	SWE	UK	US	Certifications	Album
"Gitem"	2013	—	—	—	—	—	—	—	—	—	—		Non-album singles
"King" (with Kiiara)	2021	—	—	—	—	—	—	—	—	—	—		Non-album singles
"Snap"	2022	20	29	8	6	6	4	8	8	21	67	BPI: Platinum; BVMI: Platinum; FIMI: 4× Platinum; GLF: Platinum; IFPI NOR: 2× Platinum; MC: Platinum; RIAA: Platinum	Lay Your Hands Upon My Heart
"WDIA (Would Do It Again)" (with Duncan Laurence)	2022	—	—	—	—	—	—	—	—	—	—		Non-album single
"Never Be Mine"	2023	—	—	—	—	—	—	—	—	—	—		Lay Your Hands Upon My Heart
"Hallelujah"	2023	—	—	—	—	—	—	—	—	—	—		Lay Your Hands Upon My Heart
"Universe"	2024	—	—	—	—	—	—	—	—	—	—		Non-album singles
"One Cry" (with Galantis)	2024	—	—	—	—	—	—	—	—	—	—		Non-album singles
"Where Do I Go" (with Vianney)	2024	—	—	—	—	—	—	—	—	—	—		À 2 à 3 (Deluxe)
"Out Here Looking" (with Gary Barlow)	2025	—	—	—	—	—	—	—	—	—	—		Meanwhile
"Hot Chocolate (Warmer with You)"	2025	—	—	—	—	—	—	—	—	—	—		Non-album singles
"Music I Love"	2026	—	—	— (Note: "Music I Love" did not enter the German Singles Chart, but peaked at number 51 on the German Airplay chart.)	—	—	—	—	—	—	—		Non-album singles
"—" denotes a single that did not chart or was not released in that territory.

==== As featured artist ====
Title	Year	Peak chart positions			Album or EP
Title	Year	EST Air.	HUN Air.	LTU Air.	Album or EP
"Heart Like Mine" (Sam Feldt featuring Rosa Linn)	2024	73	1	38	Time After Time
"Vardaguyn" (Yellowheart featuring Rosa Linn)	2025	—	—	—	Non-album single

== Tours ==
Headlining

- American Daydream Tour (2023)

Supporting

- Ed Sheeran – +-=÷× Tour (2023)

== Notes ==
Awards and achievements
Preceded by Athena Manoukian with "Chains on You"	Armenia in the Eurovision Song Contest; 2022	Succeeded by Brunette with "Future Lover"
