= Karina Evn =

Russian-Armenian singer (born 1997)

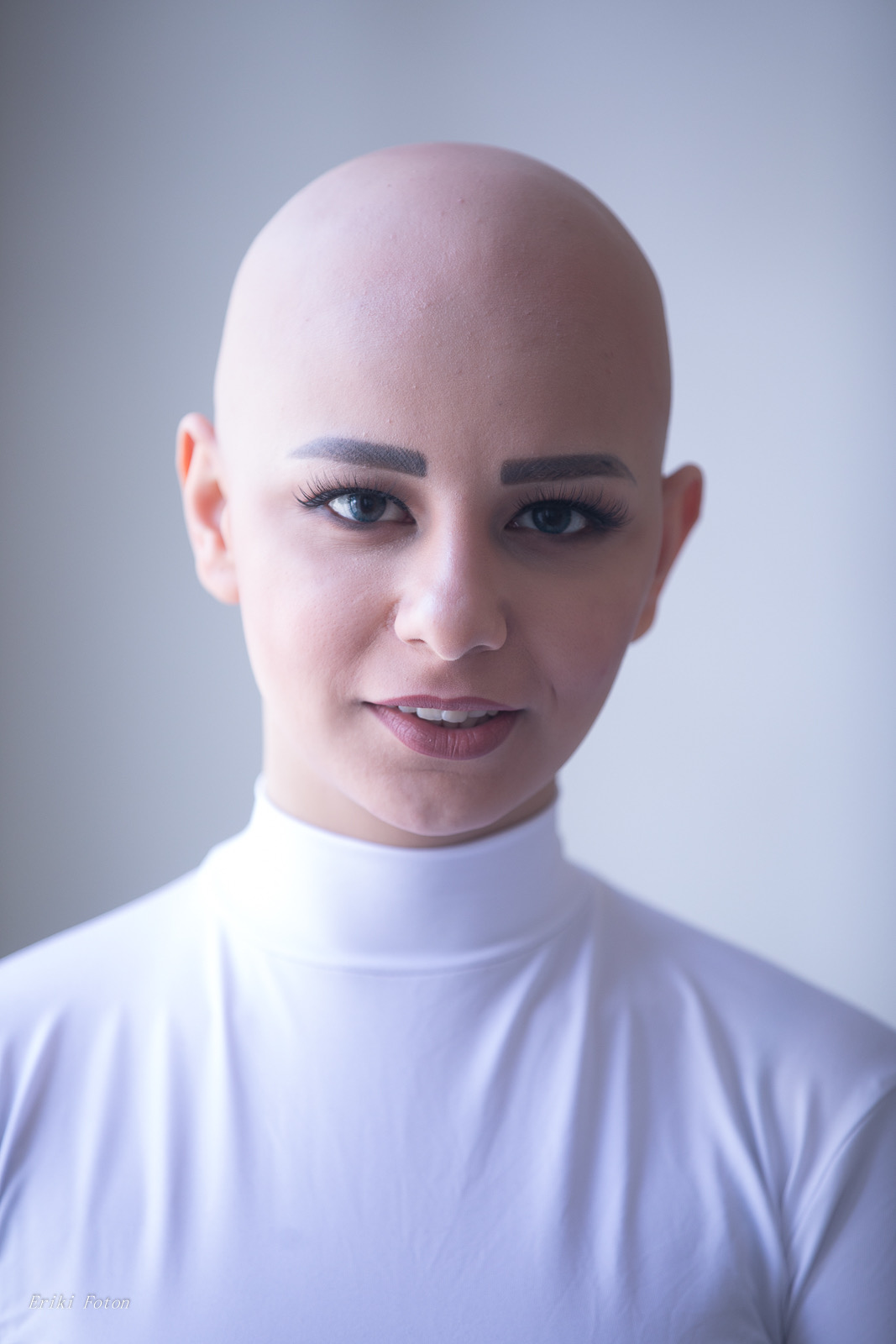

Background information
- Born: Karina Khachaturovna Akopyan; 16 August 1997 (age 29); Moscow, Russia
- Genres: Pop; R&B
- Occupations: Singer, songwriter
- Years active: 2013–present
- Website: karinaevn

Karina Khachaturovna Akopyan (Armenian: Կարինա Խաչատուրի Հակոբյան; Russian: Карина Хачатуровна Акопян; born 16 August 1997), known professionally as Karina Evn or Karina EVN (Russian: Карина Эвн), is a Russian-Armenian singer.

== Biography ==
Akopyan was born on August 16, 1997, in Moscow to an Armenian family. At the age of eight, she entered the musical school N4, where she took piano lessons.

In 2013, Akopynan entered the pop-jazz college at Gnesinka. In the same year, she participated in her first vocal contest, Stars of the New Century, and won first place. Also in the same year, she took part in the contest Golden Voice of Ostankino and won the Audience Choice Award.

In 2014, Akopyan earned the Grand Prix of the Golden Voice of Ostankino contest. In May 2014, she took part in the X Factor Armenia project, but refused to continue further participation when her hair began to fall out. Doctors diagnosed total alopecia.

In May 2015, Evn released her first single, "I Can't Take More". In 2016, she released the songs "Light up", "My Armenia", "Happy Birthday", "Wedding Waltz", "Hayastane maern e" (Armenia is ours), "Russia", and "Broken dream".

In 2017, Evn's first duet song was presented with the ex-soloist of the band "Bad Boys Bluw" Kevin McCoy, and the song premiered at the State Kremlin Palace. In the same year, the singles "Leto" and "Vsyo Zashibis" were released, which hit the iTunes charts.

In 2018, the songs "I Wish You" and "Origami Heart" were released. In March 2018, at the second all-Russian music awards show Muz. Play, Evn earned the "Talent of the Year" award. On May 26, she took part in the hip hop festival Fusion of Words, and took the second place.

In 2019, Evn took part in the second season of the project SONGS on TNT. The producers of the project were Basta and Timati. In the project she passed the stage of initial casting and qualified another 2 stages. On the show, she performed her own songs "Come with Me" and "Իmpossible"; she later released music videos for these songs. "Come with Me" landed in the 4th spot on the iTunes chart.

Evn was one of 12 finalists in a competition to represent Armenia in the 2020 Eurovision song contest. Her song "Why?" was ultimately not selected.

== Discography ==
- 2015: Не могу больше
- 2016: Зажигай
- 2016: Моя Армения
- 2016: С днем рождения
- 2016: Свадебный вальс
- 2016: Hayastane mеrn e
- 2016: Россия
- 2016: Broken dream
- 2017: Love in my car feat Kevin McCoy
- 2018: Я вам желаю
- 2018: Сердце оригами
- 2018: Dale Dale
- 2019: Иди со мной
- 2019: Невозможное
- 2019: Ритм
