= Srbuk =

Srbuk Սրբուկ
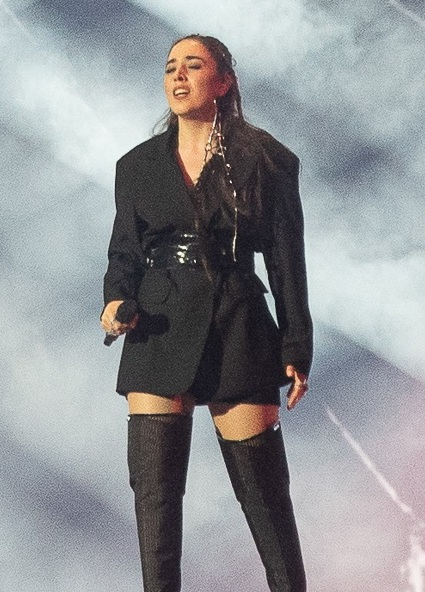
- Srbuk during a Eurovision rehearsal in May 2019

Background information
- Born: Srbuhi Sargsyan; 3 April 1994 (age 32); Yerevan, Armenia
- Occupation: Singer
- Instruments: Vocals; qanun
- Years active: 2010–present
- Formerly of: Allusion
- Website: www.srbuk.com

Srbuhi Sargsyan (Armenian: Սրբուհի Սարգսյան IPA: [sərpʰuhˈi sarkʰsjˈan]; born 3 April 1994), professionally known as Srbuk (Armenian: Սրբուկ), is an Armenian singer. She first came to prominence after competing in season one of the Armenian version of The X Factor, where she placed as the runner-up. In 2018, she competed in season eight of The Voice of Ukraine, placing fourth. Srbuk represented Armenia in the Eurovision Song Contest 2019 in Tel Aviv, Israel, with the song "Walking Out".

== Early life ==
Sargsyan was born on April 3, 1994, in Yerevan. She studied at the Komitas State Conservatory of Yerevan, where she learned to play the qanun.

== Career ==
=== 2010–2018: X Factor and The Voice ===
In 2010, Srbuk auditioned for the first season of the Armenian version of The X Factor, where she sang "Soon We'll Be Found" by Sia. She joined Garik Papoyan's team and ended up in the second place. In 2012, Srbuk decided to form a band, called Allusion, to play alongside her at small gigs and shows locally. In 2014, she was featured on Papoyan's single "Boat", which was one of the soundtracks for a Russian film, called Лёгок на поми́не.

In 2016, Srbuk released her debut single "Yete Karogh Es". In 2018, she competed in season eight of The Voice of Ukraine, being coached by Ukrainian singer Potap and placing fourth.

=== 2019–present: Eurovision Song Contest ===
In November 2018, she was announced as the Armenian representative in the Eurovision Song Contest 2019 in Tel Aviv, Israel. Right after the announcement, AMPTV also opened the song submission period for composers to send their entries. In March 2019, "Walking Out" was revealed as her entry for the contest. Composed by Lost Capital and tokionine, the lyrics of the song were written by Garik Papoyan, who previously co-wrote Armenia's 2014 entry for Aram Mp3. Srbuk performed the song on 16 May 2019 in the second semi-final of the contest and did not advance to the final, finishing 16th in the semi-final. Shortly after, the song was removed from Spotify.

In October 2019, Srbuk released a cover album titled Armenian Folk. In November 2020, amid the Nagorno-Karabakh war she was featured on a charity song titled "Mez vochinch chi haghti" (Nothing Will Win Us) along with Arthur Khachents, Iveta Mukuchyan, Gor Sujyan, Sevak Amroyan, Sevak Khanagyan and Sona Rubenyan, produced by DerHova.

== Influences ==
Her influences include Aretha Franklin, Etta James, Ella Fitzgerald, Stevie Wonder, Ray Charles and Michael Jackson.

== Discography ==
=== Albums ===
Title	Details
Armenian Folk	Released: October 14, 2019; Label: Factory Production; Format: Digital download

=== Singles ===
==== As lead artist ====
Title	Year	Album
"Yete karogh es" (If You Can)	2016	Non-album singles
"Half a Goddess"	2018	Non-album singles
"Walking Out"	2019	Non-album singles
"Na Na Na"	2019	Non-album singles
"Hagtelu enq" (We Will Win)	2020	Non-album singles
"Mez vochinch chi haghti" (Nothing Will Win Us)	2020	Non-album singles
"Siro ritm"	2022	Non-album singles

==== As featured artist ====
Title	Year	Album
"Boat" (Garik Papoyan featuring Srbuk)	2014	Non-album singles
"Let Me Down" (Hambik Ashot featuring Srbuk)	2018	Non-album singles

Awards and achievements
Preceded by Sevak Khanagyan with "Qami"	Armenia in the Eurovision Song Contest; 2019	Succeeded by Athena Manoukian with "Chains on You"
