= Chains on You =

2020 single by Athena Manoukian

Single by Athena Manoukian
- Released: 14 February 2020
- Genre: R&B, hip-hop
- Length: 3:02
- Composers: Athena Manoukian; DJ Paco
- Lyricist: Athena Manoukian

Athena Manoukian singles chronology
"XO" (2014)	"Chains on You" (2020)	"Dolla" (2020)

Alternative cover
- CD cover of Music video version of song

Eurovision Song Contest 2020 entry
- Country: Armenia
- Artist: Athena Manoukian
- Language: English
- Composers: Athena Manoukian; DJ Paco
- Lyricist: Athena Manoukian

Finals performance
- Semi-final result: Contest cancelled

Entry chronology
- ◄ "Walking Out" (2019)
- "Snap" (2022) ►

"Chains on You" is a song by Greek singer Athena Manoukian. It was to represent Armenia in the Eurovision Song Contest 2020. The song was released as a digital download on 14 February 2020. The song is influenced by R&B and hip-hop music, and is about individualism, empowerment and sexuality.

== Song and Inspiration ==
The song's hip-hop and R&B influences were a complete departure from Athena's dance-pop sound that had been seen in "XO". The song features two rapped verses. In an interview with William Lee Adams of Wiwibloggs prior to Depi Evratesil, she stated that she was not thinking of it as a Eurovision song, but wanted to take a risk. She said that the decision to go for this genre change was spontaneous, and that she wanted a "strong vibe". She wrote the lyrics on the bus in half an hour, and worked on it with her producer DJ Paco in a further two hours. She stated she wanted to blend "an Armenian vibe with American-UK vibes", and had a number of inspirations, which she stated "helped improve myself as an artist".

After it won the selection, production changes were made by Artem Valter and were unveiled with the music video. A fan poll from the website Wiwibloggs revealed that it was the most popular revamp of the would-be 2020 entries.

“It’s talking about people’s worth—people’s diamonds. Sometimes there are people trying to take these diamonds away from us, but that’s why I say, ‘keeping my diamonds on you’, ‘diamonds shining on me.’ It’s because your diamonds can only shine on you. Never forget this.”

— Athena explains the song's meaning to William Lee Adams on Wiwibloggs

== Critical reception ==
The song received strong praise from some critics for the revamp, though others were still divided. William Lee Adams, the main editor of Wiwibloggs, was particularly positive, saying "Diamonds shining on who? Diamonds shining on Athena Manoukian. This song defies Eurovision convention, proving that R&B and hip-hop do have a place in this sphere. Risky, bold, daring — Athena takes no prisoners as she pops and locks and reminds all of us of our self-worth and potential. She may sing of chains, but baby this is all about emancipation. The production has had a major revamp since Depi Evratesil — it now takes us on a journey through space-age sounds, sensual breaths and even electro-bass. This is fire." and giving it 9.5/10. However, some members of the site criticized it as being autotuned, and it got a range of reviews from 2 to 9.5 amongst the 22 members of the panel, and it got an average score of 6.5/10, the 18th highest out of the 41 songs.

On the site ESCXtra, the song received a similar reception. The reviews said that "that kind of song is quite rare. Performance-wise, a female singer who can own the stage, and with a staging from Sacha Jean-Baptiste, tends to do well in the contest. Song-wise, these hip-hop, trap beats with some rap work quite well with the televote (especially with a good staging, which is expected of SJB). The closest song sharing some of these elements would be Soldi, which also did well with the juries. And more generally, these last few years, Armenia always did better with the more modern and unique songs and genres (2014/2016).", and there was a similar degree of divisions amongst the site's 19 reviewers, where the song got 120 points, including with 2 members giving it the maximum 12 points, and one giving it the minimum 1 point, to place joint 19th out of the 41 songs.

A mixed review from Metro's Emma Kelly compared the part of song's refrain where Athena raps "I start it/I make it/I write it/I work it" to Ariana Grande's 7 Rings, but "had a soft spot" for its rhyming, though thinking it felt "a standard floor-filler circa 2006", giving it 6.8/10.

The heavily divided reviews the song received were also shown in organised alternative competitions. Austria's ORF aired Der kleine Song Contest in April 2020, which saw every entry being assigned to one of three semi-finals. A jury consisting of ten singers that had represented Austria at Eurovision before was hired to rank each song; the best-placed in each semi-final advanced to the final round. In the first semi-final on 14 April, "Chains on You" placed twelfth in a field of 14 participants, achieving 42 points, with some members of the panel giving it 0 points and some giving it 8. The song also unsuccessfully took part in Norddeutscher Rundfunk's Eurovision 2020 – das deutsche Finale and Sveriges Television's Sveriges 12:a on 9 May.

It was also one of the 6 songs mentioned on the Time Out website’s list of its favourite Eurovision 2020 songs along with Iceland, Italy, Australia, Ireland and the editor James Manning‘s native United Kingdom - he said of Chains On You: “Trap beats don’t often get a look in at Eurovision, so big shout-out to Armenia’s Athena Manoukian for bringing a moody and pretty credible low-rider to the contest. Shades of Bey (Beyoncé) and Ri (Rihanna) here.”

The Ticketmaster website’s guide to Eurovision 2020’s cancelled entries said of it “Athena sets the stage for Armenia with Chains On You, a song which wouldn’t be out of place on the UK pop charts. It’s a contemporary bop number with some clear rap and hip-hop influences, delivered with plenty of attitude and confidence. This one could have done pretty well, and remains a welcome addition to any party playlist.”

== Eurovision Song Contest ==
The song was to represent Armenia in the Eurovision Song Contest 2020, after Athena Manoukian was selected through Depi Evratesil, the music competition that selects Armenia's entries for the Eurovision Song Contest, after winning the selection as a result of gaining 118/120 jury points following a performance which largely saw her sitting on a throne, and wearing a purple leotard with long ruffle sleeves, with 4 male dancers with unbuttoned purple suits. On 28 January 2020, a special allocation draw was held which placed each country into one of the two semi-finals, as well as which half of the show they would perform in. Armenia was placed into the second semi-final, to be held on 14 May 2020, and was scheduled to perform in the second half of the show. However, on 18 March, it was announced that the event would be cancelled due to the 2019-20 coronavirus pandemic. During the Eurovision Song Celebration YouTube broadcast on 14 May, it was revealed the song would have performed 14th out of the 18 songs, after Finland's entry and before Portugal's. It was the penultimate 2020 entry to be shown on Eurovision: Europe Shine a Light, with only the Host entry shown later.

== Music video ==
The music video for "Chains on You", directed by Arthur Manukyan, was released on Eurovision's official YouTube channel on 13 March, along with a revamp to the song's production. The music video features her in two surroundings, one in which she is wearing a white minidress with Fringes on the sleeves, dancing in front of, and writhing on top of, a diamond, and the other in a black dress on top of a Bodystocking, with a crown on her head, sitting on a throne. As of 26 May 2020, the video had over 5 million views. A fan poll for the website Wiwibloggs rated the video as the second most popular of the would-be 2020 entries, behind The Maltese entry, and it was featured prominently in replacement entertainment such as Eurovision Song Celebration and Eurovision: Europe Shine a Light.

“We had only 2 weeks after Depi Evratesil to revamp the song and shoot the music video, and after days and nights of rehearsals and preparations I’m very excited to share the result of our work. It is truly a joy working alongside such a professional team and believe me, we have a lot more surprises coming up!”

— Athena describes her song's video

== Track listing ==
Digital download
No.	Title	Length
1.	"Chains on You"	3:02

== Release history ==
Region	Date	Format	Label	Ref.
Various	14 February 2020	Digital download, streaming	Self-released	
