= Garik Papoyan =

Armenian actor (born 1984)

Garik Papoyan Գարիկ Պապոյան
- Born: 20 September 1984 (age 41); Leninakan, Armenian SSR, Soviet Union
- Education: Russian-Armenian University
- Occupations: Actor, musician, presenter, humorist, producer, lyricist, writer, singer
- Years active: 2006–present

Garik Yurii Papoyan (Armenian: Գարիկ Յուրիի Պապոյան, born 20 September 1984) is an Armenian actor, musician, presenter, producer, writer, comedian and singer.

== Early life ==
Garik Papoyan was born on 20 September 1984 in Leninakan (now called Gyumri). He received secondary education at No. 196 secondary school of Yerevan. In 2001, he entered the Faculty of Tourism and Advertisement of Russian-Armenian University, which he graduated from in 2008. From 2003 to 2005 he served in the Armenian Army.

== Career ==
He first came to prominence as a member of 32 Atam club from 2006–2010, and later appeared on its spin-off titled Vitamin Club. In 2014, he wrote "Not Alone" for Aram Mp3, which represented Armenia in the Eurovision Song Contest 2014 in Denmark and finished fourth in the final. In 2016, he formed the duo Garik & Sona with singer Sona Rubenyan, releasing several singles including "Lusin", "Esor Urbat e", "Nino" and more. Papoyan is the creator of the "Rock Generation" movement in Armenia.

== Personal life ==
In August 2012, he married Marianne from the "X Factor" project, Mars On. The pair now has 3 daughters.

== Filmography ==
Film
Year	Title	Role	Notes
2014	Super Mother	Menua	
2015	Love Odd	Rafo "Rafayel"	
2017	Super Mother 2	Menua	

Television and web
Year	Title	Role	Notes
2006–2010	32 Atam (32 ատամ)	various	
2007–2008	Two Stars (Երկու աստղ)	various	Singer, featuring Hasmik Karapetyan
2010	Our Yard (Մեր բակը)	various	
2010–2015	Vitamin Club (Վիտամին ակումբ)	various	
2016	Stone Cage	Indian	5 episode

As himself
Year	Title	Notes
2009–2010	3 Wall (3 պատ)	Host
2010	Hello Garik (Ալո գարիկ)	Host
2010	X Factor	Jury Member
2010–2011	No Problem (Հարց չկա)	Host, featuring Aram MP3
2011–2012	Hay Superstar (Հայ Սուպերսթար)	Jury Member
2012–2013	Cash humor (Կանխիկ հումոր)	Jury Member
2016–2017	Suspicious Evening (Կասկածելի Երեկո)	Host, featuring Robert Martirosyan
2017–2019	Nice Evening (Լավ Երեկո)	Host, featuring Aram MP3
2021	Garik's Evening (Գարիկի Երեկոն)	Host
2022	Junior Eurovision Song Contest 2022	Host, alongside Iveta Mukuchyan and Karina Ignatyan

== Songwriting ==
Year	Title	Artist	Notes
2014	"Not Alone"	Aram Mp3	Represented Armenia in the Eurovision Song Contest 2014
2019	"Walking Out"	Srbuk	Represented Armenia in the Eurovision Song Contest 2019

== Awards and nominations ==
Year	Organization	Award	Recipient	Result	Ref
2014	LUXURY award	Advertising face	Himself	Won	
2018	Swallow Music Awards	The Hit of The Year	"Lusin" (Garik & Sona)	Won	

Preceded by (France) Carla, Élodie Gossuin and Olivier Minne	Junior Eurovision Song Contest presenter 2022; With: Iveta Mukuchyan and Karina Ignatyan	Succeeded by (France) Olivier Minne and Laury Thilleman
