= Vika Martirosyan =

Armenian choreographer and dancer

- Վիկա Մարտիրոսյան
- Born: Viktorya Martirosyan; February 15, 1985 (age 41); Yerevan, Armenia
- Citizenship: Armenia
- Occupations: choreographer; dancer
- Awards: Amadeus International Competition Festival; "ВАГАНОВА – PRIX " 5th International Ballet Competition; Prix de Lausanne compétition (lauréate); "Crane/ Կռունկ" festival (Grand Prix); "I/ Ես" Awards (Best Group of the Year); 21 TV Armenian Music Awards Best Dance Video of the Year Award; Certificate by the Union of Dance Artists of Armenia after Vanush Khanamiryan

Vika Martirosyan (Armenian: Վիկա Մարտիրոսյան, birth name Viktorya Ashoti Martirosyan, Armenian: Վիկտորյա Աշոտի Մարտիրոսյան; born 15 February 1985, Yerevan, Armenian SSR, USSR) is an Armenian choreographer and dancer.

== Biography ==
Vika Martirosyan was born in Yerevan, Soviet Armenia, on February 15, 1985, in a family of artists. Her parents were soloists of "Tatul Altunyan State Song and Dance Ensemble". Her sister is a dancer as well.

=== Education ===
From 1991 to 1994 she studied at the "Barekamutyun" dance ensemble after Hovsep Shamamyan. In 1992 she entered and then graduated from French immersion Secondary school No. 119 named after Nelson Stepanian. In 1994 she studied at the classical dance department of Yerevan Dancing Art State college. From 2013 to 2018 she studied part-time in the dance department at the Armenian State Pedagogical University after Khachatur Abovyan and received bachelor's degree with honour.

== Career ==
After graduating from the college in 2003, she was admitted to A. Spendiaryan National Academic Opera and Ballet Theater as a ballet actress. She has worked there for five years after that she continued her activity as the Art director of "Amaras" dance ensemble. The latter was founded on October 25, 1995, according to the idea of his father Ashot Martirosyan, after the church in Artsakh. On October 25, 2015, the Academic Opera and Ballet Theater hosted a solo concert dedicated to the 20th anniversary of the "Amaras" Dance Ensemble by representatives of the Armenian show business (Silva Hakobyan, Arame, Eric, Hripsime Hakobyan, Martin Mkrtchyan, Christine Pepelyan, Angelina Gasparyan, Gevorg Martirosyan, etc.). On May 2, 2017, the personal video of the "Amaras" dance ensemble was released, directed by Artyom Abovyan. On July 10, 2018, the Gabriel Sundukyan National Academic Theater hosted a dance performance by the "Amaras" Dance Ensemble called "Treasures of Amaras". 380 dance group students of all ages took part in this musical performance. In February 2021, the new studio of AMARAS DANCE STUDIO was founded.

=== Junior Eurovision Song Contest 2019 ===
Following the results of the 2019 Armenian Junior Eurovision Song Contest, it became known that Karina Ignatyan will represent Armenia in the Junior Eurovision 2019 international song contest. The lyrics of her song "Colors Of Your Dream" were written by Avet Barseghyan and Margarita Doroshich, and the author of the music was Russian composer Taras Demchuk. Vika Martirosyan was the organizer and choreographer of the dance in both the video clip and stage performance.

Karina is quite expressive and artistic, very talented, and she dances very beautifully. The music is interesting, colorful, most importantly it's a hit song, the beats make you dance and I love it when there are Armenian features in it. We could easily combine Armenian folk dance with hip-hop style. For the video clip we collaborated with Russian choreographers.

— Vika Martirosyan

=== Video clips ===
| Year | Singer | Song | English name | Notes |
|---|---|---|---|---|
| 2011 | Mihran Tsarukyan | "Siro Kino" | "Love movie" | |
| 2012 | Mihran Tsarukyan | "Gol" | "Goal" | |
| 2013 | Sargis Avetisyan | "Ser arajin hayatsk’its" | "Love at first sight" | |
| 2013 | Hripsime Hakobyan | "Khostovanut’yun" | "Confession" | |
| 2013 | Mihran Tsarukyan | "T’e kuzes" | "If you want" | |
| 2014 | Mihran Tsarukyan | "Tsnundd shnorhavor" | "Happy Birthday" | |
| 2014 | Sargis Avetisyan | "Du imn es" | "You are mine" | |
| 2014 | Karen Sevak | "Irakan" | "Real" | |
| 2014 | Hripsime Hakobyan | "Loca, Loca" | "Loka, loka" | |
| 2015 | Lilit Hovhannisyan, Nanul | "Im tiknikn es" | "You’re my doll" | |
| 2015 | Lilu | "Handipel em" | "I have met him" | |
| 2016 | Gevorg Martirosyan | "Harsanik’i ory" | "At the Wedding" | |
| 2016 | Hripsime Hakobyan | "Im sirty lik’n a" | "My heart is full" | |
| 2016 | Martin Mkrtchyan | "Nver" | "A gift" | |
| 2016 | Sargis Avetisyan | "Jan Jigyars" | "Jan, my everything" | |
| 2016 | Hripsime Hakobyan, Martin Mkrtchyan | "Happy Birthday" | "Happy Birthday" | |
| 2017 | Martin Mkrtchyan | "K’efs million ē" | "I am all high" | |
| 2017 | Nanul | "Nanuli parn a" | "Nanul’s dance it is" | |
| 2018 | Arman Hovhannisyan | "Eli na" | "She again" | |
| 2018 | Hripsime Hakobyan | "Tapalel es" | "You’ve overthrown me" | |
| 2018 | Nick Egibyan | "Amachel chka" | "Nothing to be shy about" | |
| 2018 | Tatev Asatryan | "Jan jan" | "Jan jan" | |
| 2019 | Arame, Jilbér | "Yar unem, parum em" | "I have a lover and I dance" | |
| 2019 | Christine Pepelyan | "Eli kyntrem k’ez" | "I will choose you over again" | |
| 2019 | Nick Egibyan | "Baghchits tsaghik" | "A flower from the garden" | |
| 2019 | Karina Ignatyan | "Colours Of Your Dream" | "Colours Of Your Dream" | , Junior Eurovision 2019 |
| 2020 | Sargis Avetisyan | "Shnorhavor" | "Congrats" | |
| 2020 | Armenchik | "Aveli" | "More" | |
| 2020 | Arman Hovhannisyan | "K’ez" | "To you" | |
| 2020 | Armenchik | "K’aghtsr" | "Sweet" | |
| 2021 | Sargis Avetisyan | "K’aghtsrs" | "My sweet heart" | |
| 2021 | Hakob Hakobyan, Armen Hovhannisyan | "K’ich ē, k’ich ē" | "Not enough, never" | |

== Participation ==
Vika Martirosyan has taken part in many international festivals and competitions.

- 2007: Armenian Music Awards - festival performance director
- 2008: Participation in the annual Cannes International Film Festival, France
- 2010: Special invitation to perform a ballet troupe in Almaty, Kazakhstan
- 2017: Participation in the "Armenia Europe Music Awards" on March 26 in Paris, France
- (director of dance performances / choreographer)
- 2018: Participation in the "Ensembl" competition of Georgian national dances

== Awards ==
- 1998: Amadeus International Competition Festival (bronze medalist, lauréate)
- 2002: "ВАГАНОВА – PRIX " 5th International Ballet Competition (2nd place) in St. Petersburg
- 2002: Prix de Lausanne compétition (lauréate), Switzerland
- 2005: "Crane/ Կռունկ" festival (Grand Prix), Armenia
- 2007: "I/ Ես" Awards (Best Group of the Year)
- 2014: 21 TV Armenian Music Awards Best Dance Video of the Year Award (Lilit Hovhannisyan "Well, don’t ever")
- 2017: Received Certificate by the Union of Dance Artists of Armenia after Vanush Khanamiryan.

== Personal life ==
Vika Martirosyan is married with two children.
