= Wiwibloggs =

Eurovision Song Contest-focused YouTube channel and former fansite

- Logo used from 2009 to 2017
- Website type: Eurovision news, YouTube channel
- Available in: English
- Founder: William Lee Adams
- Website: wiwibloggs.com
- Launched: 22 April 2009; 17 years ago
- Current status: Closed; remains active on YouTube and other platforms

Wiwibloggs is a YouTube channel focusing on the Eurovision Song Contest. It launched as a fansite in 2009 by journalist William Lee Adams.

== History ==
In April 2015, Wiwibloggs won the Arts & Culture category at the UK Blog Awards. Adams has judged at national selections for a number of countries, among them Armenia (in 2017), Belarus (in 2020), Estonia (in 2024 and 2025), Finland (every year between 2017 and 2021), Germany (in 2019 and 2026), Norway (in 2017 and 2018), Romania (in 2019, alongside fellow Wiwibloggs correspondent Deban Aderemi), Slovenia (in 2025), and Spain (in 2024). Wiwibloggs staffers have also been among the jurors for selections in Latvia and Portugal. In some cases, their role as jurors in national selection finals has been criticized by local media. During the Eurovision Song Contest 2016, Adams and Aderemi served as special guests on Studio Eurovision, Swedish host broadcaster SVT's Eurovision preview show. Adams had a cameo appearance as himself in Eurovision Song Contest: The Story of Fire Saga (2020).

Adams announced the closure of the Wiwibloggs website on 13 February 2026. It remains active on YouTube and other social media platforms.
