= Walking Out (song) =

2019 song by Srbuk

Single by Srbuk
- Released: 10 March 2019
- Recorded: 2019
- Length: 2:56
- Label: Effective
- Songwriter(s): Garik Papoyan; Lost Capital; tokionine
- Producer(s): Lost Capital; George Brainshaker

Srbuk singles chronology
"Half a Goddess" (2018)	"Walking Out" (2019)	"Na Na Na" (2019)

Eurovision Song Contest 2019 entry
- Country: Armenia
- Artist(s): Srbuk
- Language: English
- Composer(s): Lost Capital, tokionine
- Lyricist(s): Garik Papoyan

Finals performance
- Semi-final result: 16th
- Semi-final points: 49
- Final result: Did not qualify

Entry chronology
- ◄ "Qami" (2018)
- "Chains on You" (2020) ►

"Walking Out" is a 2019 song by Armenian singer Srbuk. It represented Armenia at the Eurovision Song Contest 2019 in Tel Aviv, Israel after being internally selected by the Public Television Company of Armenia (AMPTV), Armenia's broadcaster for the Eurovision Song Contest. Composed by Lost Capital and tokionine, the lyrics of the song were written by Garik Papoyan, who had previously co-written Armenia's 2014 entry for Aram Mp3. It did not advance to the final.

== Background ==
According to Srbuk, the song is about a woman walking away from a toxic relationship. In the music video that was released, men are shown disrespecting a woman. She is then able to push back, with her new-found strength to walk out of the relationship.

== Music video ==
The music video for "Walking Out", directed by Arthur Manukyan, was teased on 8 March 2019. It was released on Eurovision's official YouTube channel on March 10. While talking about the music video, Srbuk said:

We wanted to visually portray the emotions within a loving but betrayed heart. When you think you will be filled with joy, but instead there is not enough air to breathe. When you want to share your happiness, but instead you start losing yourself: your hands are tied, your emotions are overwhelming, you keep pretending just to keep your love alive. But what are you waiting for? How long can you play by these rules? These are the questions and emotions visualized in the music video.

== Eurovision Song Contest ==
The song was performed on 16 May 2019 in the second semi-final of Eurovision Song Contest in Tel Aviv, Israel, but did not gain enough points to advance to the final. It was later revealed to have received 49 Points placing 16th becoming the worst result for Armenia at Eurovision.

== Track listings ==
Digital download
No.	Title	Length
1.	"Walking Out"	2:56

Digital download
No.	Title	Length
1.	"Walking Out" (Piano Cover)	4:09

Digital download
No.	Title	Length
1.	"Walking Out" (Going Deeper Remix)	3:08
