= Ladaniva =

French-Armenian music band

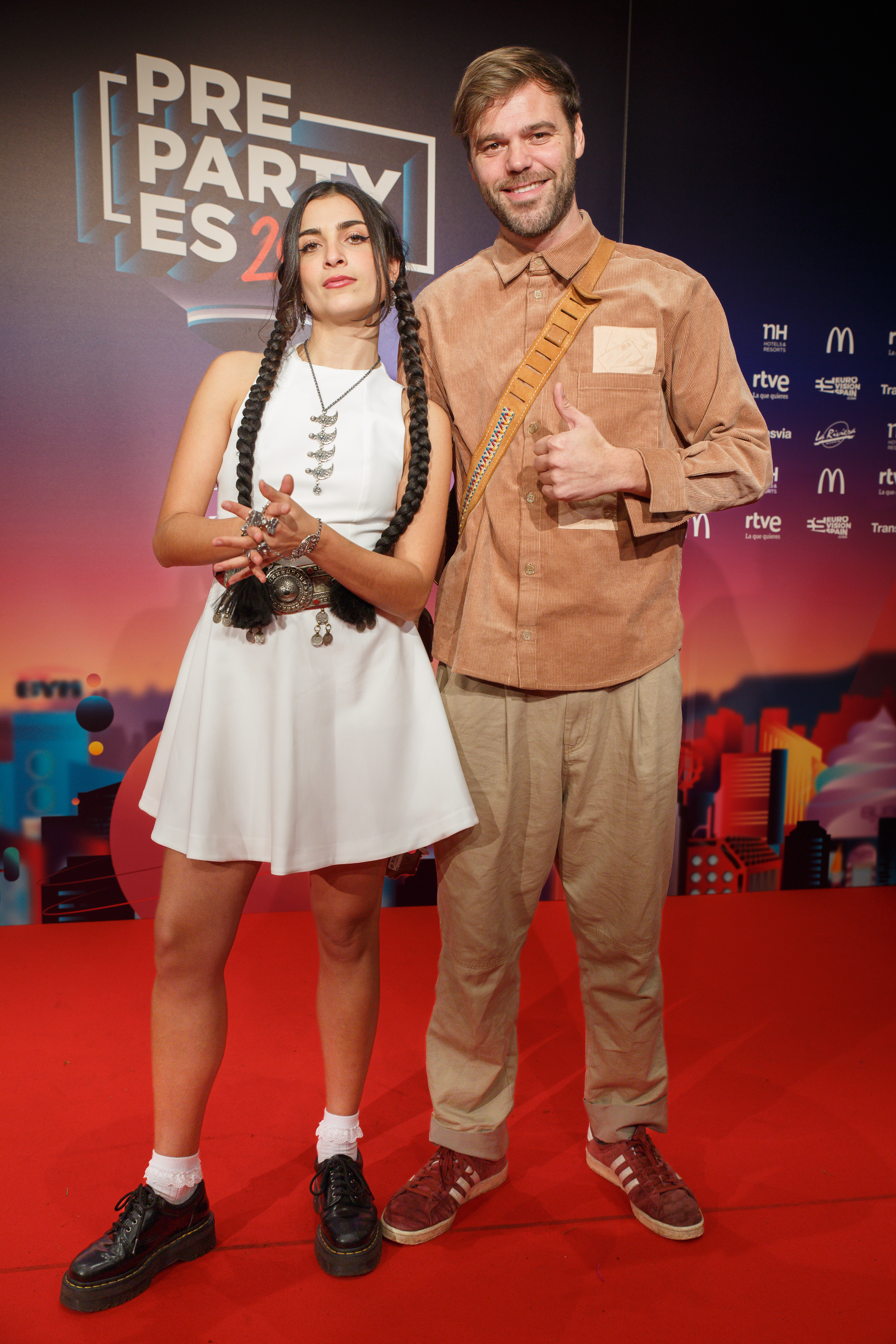
- Ladaniva in 2024

Background information
- Origin: Lille, France
- Genre: World
- Years active: 2019–present
- Label: Jiguli / PIAS Recordings
- Members: Jaklin Baghdasaryan; Louis Thomas

Ladaniva (Armenian: Լադանիվա; stylized in all caps, named in reference to the off-road SUV Lada Niva) is a French-Armenian world music group originally from Lille. The duo, founded in 2019, consists of Armenian singer Jaklin Baghdasaryan and French multi-instrumentalist Louis Thomas. Their musical style is inspired by music from around the world, particularly traditional Balkan music, maloya and Armenian folklore. They represented Armenia in the Eurovision Song Contest 2024 with the song "Jako".

== History ==
Ladaniva was formed in 2019 in Lille as a result of the collaboration between singer Jaklin Baghdasaryan and multi-instrumentalist Louis Thomas. Baghdasaryan, born in 1997 in Yeghegnadzor, Armenia, grew up in Minsk, Belarus, before emigrating to France with her mother in 2014. She has been singing since her early childhood and, based in Tourcoing, enrolled at the Conservatoire de Lille. Thomas, born in 1987 in Lille and an accomplished jazz musician from a family of musicians, also attended the conservatory. One evening in 2018, they met by chance during a jam session in a music bar in Vieux-Lille, l'Intervalle.

In March and April 2020, while many countries hit by the COVID-19 pandemic were in lockdown, Ladaniva published two music videos, "Vay Aman" and "Zepyuri Nman", which met with great success, particularly with the Armenian community. Later, in September 2024, they published their music video "Kef Chilini", which reached 18 million views in a few months. In 2023, Ladaniva released their first album, which is self-titled, produced and distributed by PIAS.

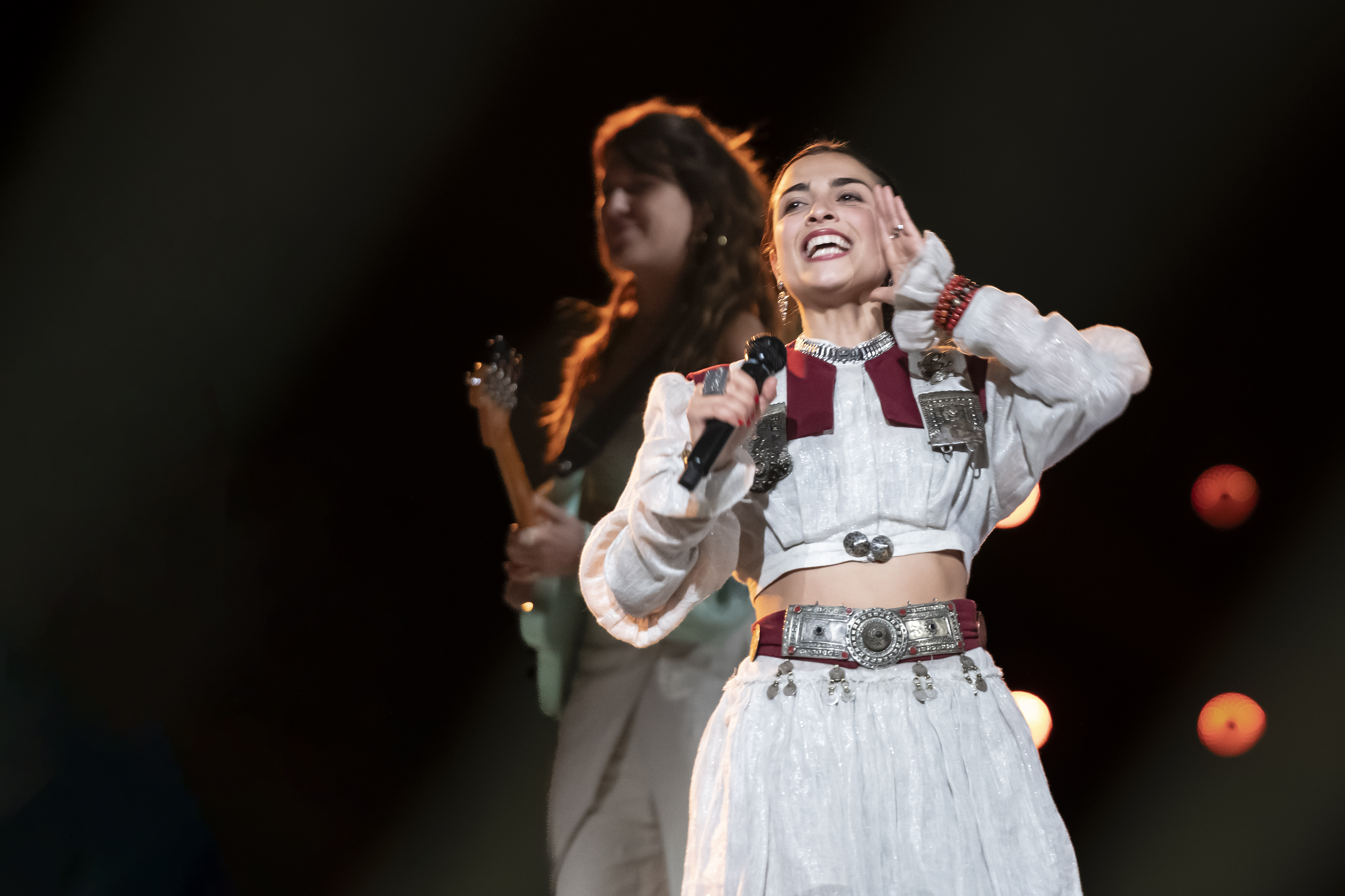
Ladaniva at the Eurovision Song Contest 2024.

On 9 March 2024, Ladaniva were officially announced as the Armenian representatives for the Eurovision Song Contest 2024. On 13 March, "Jako" was revealed as their entry for the contest. They placed third out of 16 in the second semi-final on 9 May 2024 with 137 points and eighth out of 25 in the Grand Final on 11 May 2024 with 183 points, Armenia's best result since 2016.

== Musical style ==
Ladaniva's repertoire is inspired on one hand by traditional songs from Armenia, Russia, Romania and the Balkans, and on the other hand by music from Latin America, Africa and Reunion Island.

== Accolades ==
Ladaniva was awarded a Music Moves Europe Award via the Public Choice Award in 2022.

== Discography ==
=== Studio albums ===
Title	Details
Ladaniva	Released: 29 September 2023; Label: Jiguli, PIAS; Formats: Digital download, streaming
Ladaniva (Postcards)	Released: 14 June 2024; Label: Jiguli, PIAS; Formats: Digital download, streaming
Yasaman	Released: 13 November 2026; Label: Jiguli, PIAS; Formats: Digital download, streaming

=== Extended plays ===
Title	Details
Ladaniva	Released: 13 June 2020; Label: Jiguli, PIAS; Formats: Digital download, streaming

=== Singles ===
==== As lead artist ====
Title	Year	Peak chart positions				Album or EP
Title	Year	GRE Intl.	LTU	ROM Air.	SWE Heat.	Album or EP
"Kef chilini"	2020	—	—	—	—	Non-album singles
"Oror"	2020	—	—	—	—	Non-album singles
"Pourquoi t'as fait ça?"	2021	—	—	—	—	Non-album singles
"Shakar"	2023	—	—	—	—	Ladaniva
"Wayo waya"	2023	—	—	—	—	Ladaniva
"Je voulais"	2023	—	—	—	—	Ladaniva
"Je t'aime tellement"	2023	—	—	—	—	Ladaniva
"Jako"	2023	19	22	—	12	Ladaniva
"Here's to You Ararat"	2024	—	—	—	—	Ladaniva (Postcards)
"Saraiman"	2024	—	—	88	—	Ladaniva (Postcards)
"Yasaman"	2026	—	—	—	—	Yasaman
"Margarita"	2026	—	—	—	—	Yasaman
"Le temps"	2026	—	—	—	—	Yasaman
"—" denotes a recording that did not chart or was not released in that territory.

=== Other appearances ===
Title	Year	Album or EP
"Malika" (Voyou featuring Ladaniva)	2021	Chroniques terrestres, Vol. 1
"Nuages" (Luiza featuring Ladaniva)	2026	Luiza

Awards and achievements
Preceded by Brunette with "Future Lover"	Armenia in the Eurovision Song Contest; 2024	Succeeded by Parg with "Survivor"
