= Parg (musician) =

Armenian singer-songwriter (born 1996)

Parg Պարգ
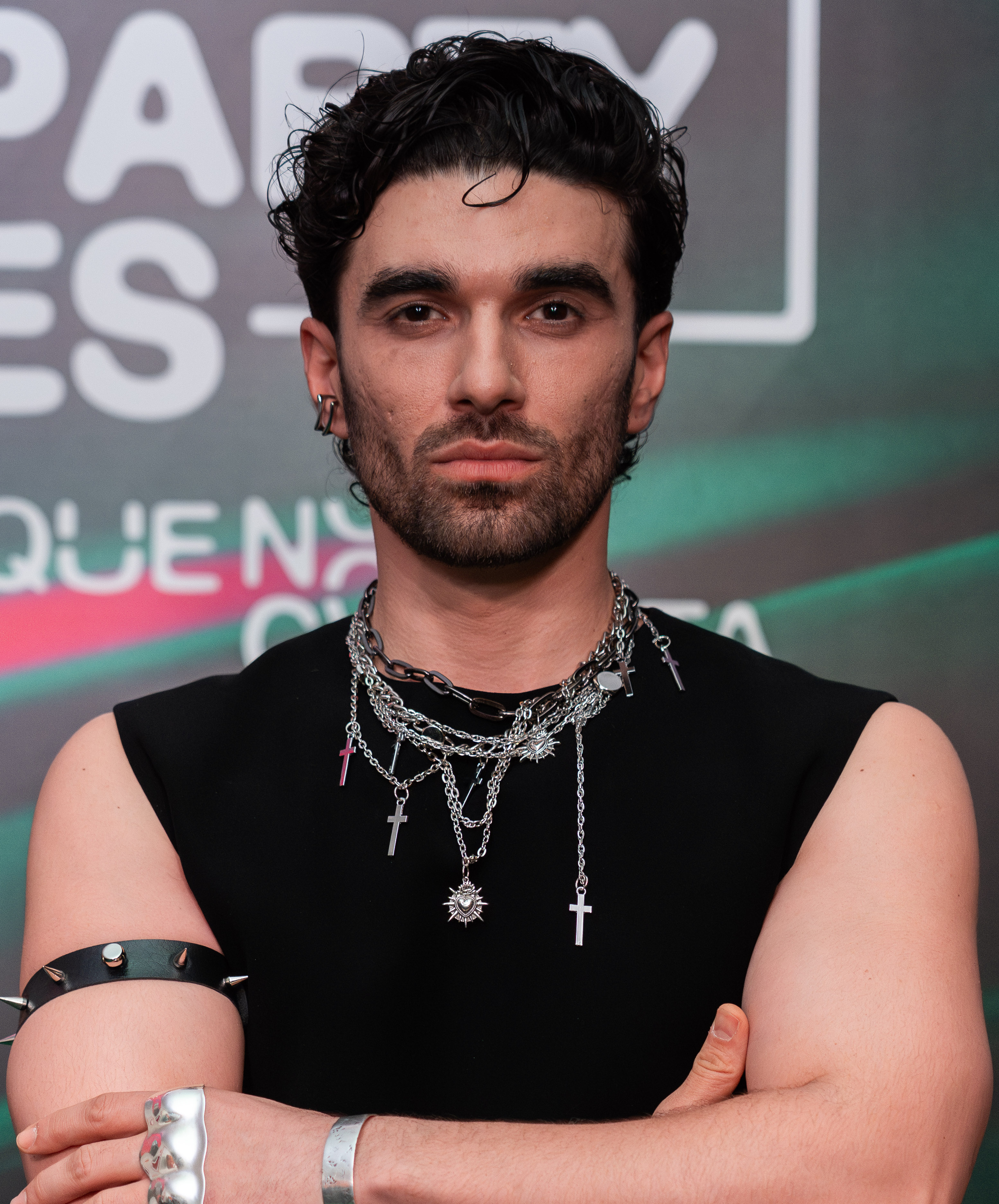
- Parg in 2025

Background information
- Born: Pargev Vardanian; 7 June 1996 (age 30); Hayravank, Armenia
- Genre: Pop
- Occupations: Singer; songwriter
- Instrument: Vocals
- Years active: 2020–present
- Formerly of: The Edge Chronicals

Pargev Vardanian (Armenian: Պարգև Վարդանյան, romanized: Pargev Vardanyan; born 7 June 1996), known professionally as Parg (Armenian: Պարգ; stylised in all caps), is an Armenian singer and songwriter based in Yerevan. Parg released his debut single, "Ginin u grely", in 2021. He represented Armenia in the Eurovision Song Contest 2025 with the song "Survivor".

== Early life and career ==
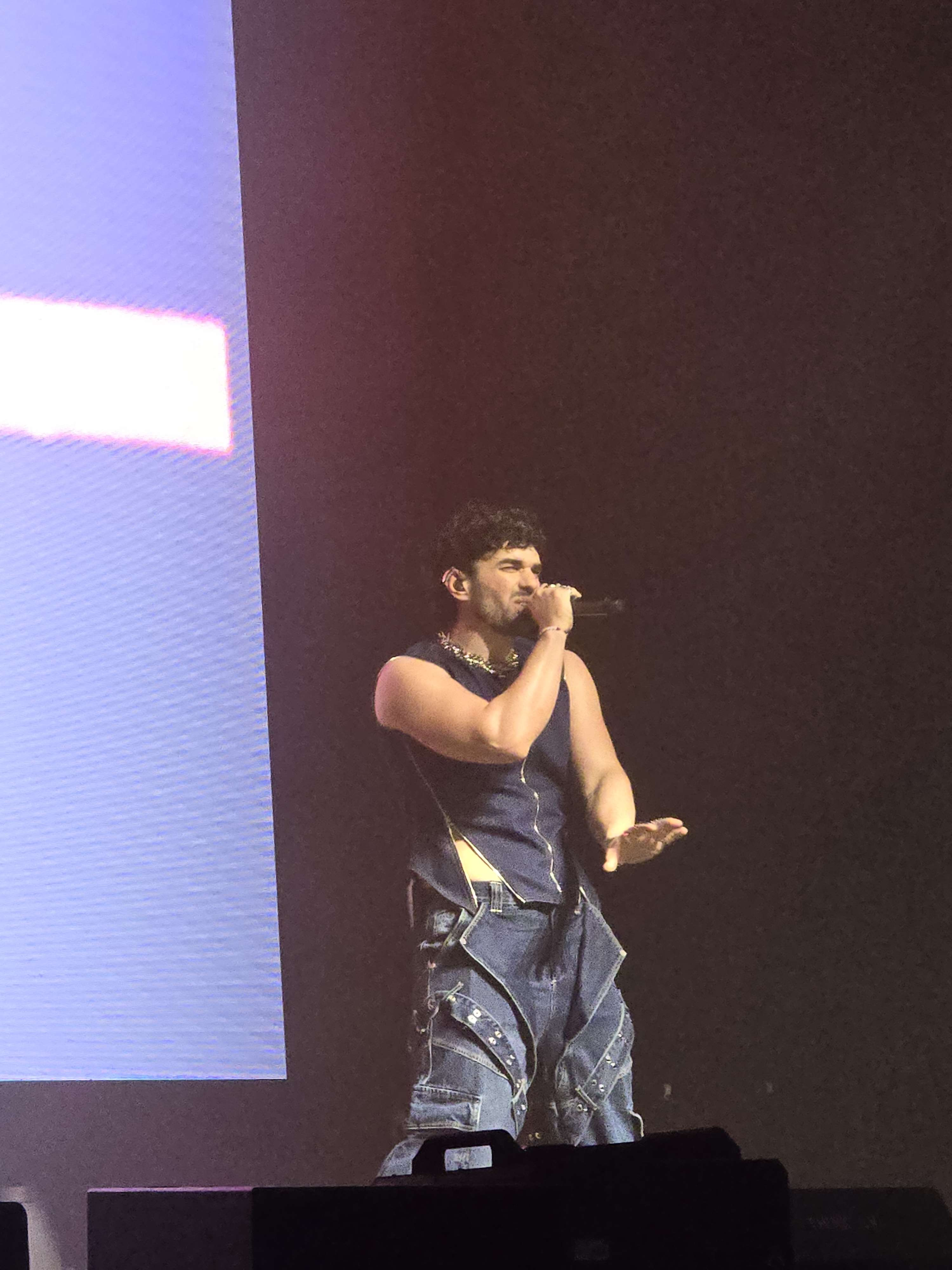
Parg performing at the Eurovision in Concert preparty event in 2025

Parg was born on 7 June 1996 to Armenian parents in Hayravank, Geghargunik, Armenia. Parg and his family moved to Volgograd, Russia, when he was still young, where he attended the Volgograd State Institute of Theater and Cinema and graduated with a degree in Theater Arts & Acting, where he also co-founded a band called The Edge Chronicles. Between 2017 and 2019, the band toured local venues in Armenia, Russia, Georgia, and Ukraine.

Parg moved back to Armenia in 2022. In June of that year, Parg opened for Zaz at the HAYA Festival in Yerevan. Ever since, he has covered songs by artists like Rosa Linn and collaborated with Brunette.

He's nominated for an Armenian Music Video Award 2024 for his song "Araj". His 2024 single, "Kanchum em", received critical acclaim.

Parg competed at Depi Evratesil 2025 with the song "Survivor". receiving the second most points from national and international juries and first place in televote, ultimately winning the competition and receiving the right to represent Armenia in the Eurovision Song Contest 2025 in Basel, where he finished 20th. He was Armenia's spokesperson in the contest the following year, giving the 12 points to Australia's Delta Goodrem and her song "Eclipse".

== Personal life ==
Since 2024, Vardanyan has been married to Nana Vardanyan.

== Discography ==
=== Extended plays ===
Title	Details
Theatre Session (Live Edition)	Released: 18 March 2023; Label: Self-released; Formats: Digital download, streaming

=== Singles ===
Title	Year	Peak chart positions	Album or EP
Title	Year	LTU	Album or EP
"Tell Me"	2020	—	Non-album singles
"Sareri hovin mernem"	2020	—	Non-album singles
"Kuzes"	2021	—	Non-album singles
"Ginin u grely"	2021	—	Non-album singles
"Snap" (solo or with J-Marin)	2022	—	Non-album singles
"Araj"	2023	—	Non-album singles
"Arev es" (with Brunette)	2024	—	Non-album singles
"Qo mot"	2024	—	Non-album singles
"Kanchum em"	2024	—	Non-album singles
"Es nor tarin"	2024	—	Non-album singles
"Survivor"	2025	60	Non-album singles
"Sarn es"	2026	—	Non-album singles
"Sery mer"	2026	—	Non-album singles
"Feel Alive"	2026	—	Non-album singles
"Ancatsa" (with Nerses Avetisyan)	2026	—	Non-album singles
"—" denotes a recording that did not chart or was not released in that territory.

== Awards and nominations ==
Year	Award	Category	Nominee(s)	Result	Ref.
2025	Eurovision Awards	Luscious Locks	Himself	Nominated	

Awards and achievements
Preceded by Ladaniva with "Jako"	Armenia in the Eurovision Song Contest; 2025	Succeeded by Simón with "Paloma Rumba"
