= Percy Nilsson =

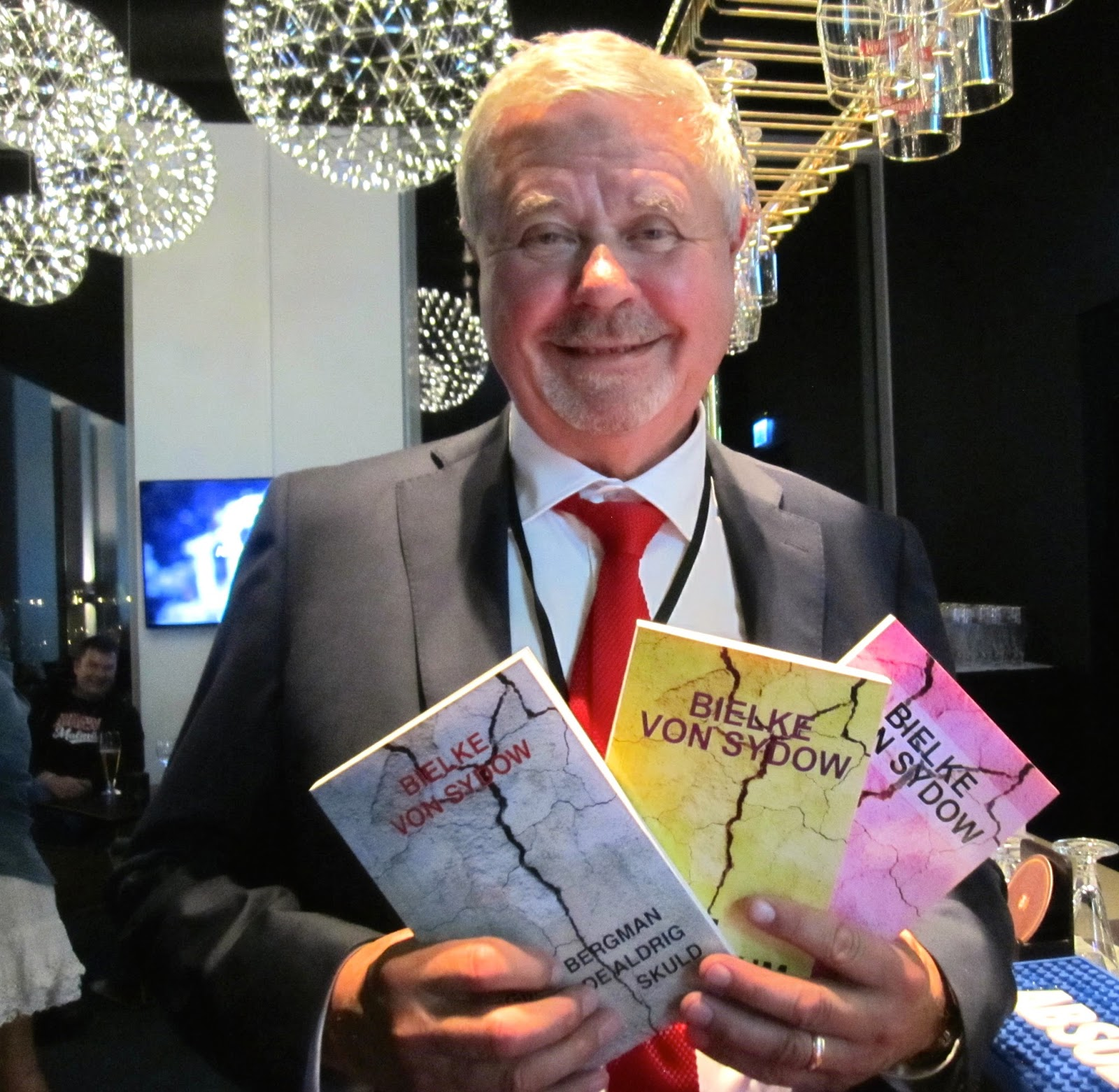

Chairman of the Malmö Redhawks
- In office 1984–2005

Personal details
- Born: 22 May 1943; Malmö, Sweden
- Occupation: businessman
- Known for: construction of Malmö Arena

Percy Nilsson (born 22 May 1943 in Malmö) is a Swedish businessman, constructor and sports person. He is most notable for his long-term chairmanship of Malmö Redhawks and the construction of Malmö Arena by his company Parkfast AB.

== Career ==
Percy Nilsson is an educated carpenter and has also been a nightclub owner. He soon started his own construction company, Percy Nilsson Bygg (PNB). PNB was sold by Nilsson in 2004, although he had sold the company previously in the 1990s and later bought back a 50% stock share. PNB went bankrupt shortly after the sale and Nilsson was held accountable by his guaranty, Nilsson paid 112 million kronor to various creditors.

=== Malmö Redhawks ===
Percy Nilsson was elected chairman of ice hockey club Malmö Redhawks in 1984. Percy Nilsson contributed large funds to the club to turn around its bad financial situation. The bid turned out to be successful as Redhawks was promoted to the highest tier of Swedish ice hockey, Elitserien in 1990. The club also became Swedish champions in 1992 and 1994. The club was relegated to HockeyAllsvenskan again in 2005 but returned to the highest tier in 2006 when it was relegated after one season.

Nilsson resigned as chairman of Redhawks in 2005 as he had been sentenced to a one-year prison sentence for dubious disbursements on 27 April 2005. Nilsson was later fully acquitted on 1 March 2006 after the case had been appealed to Hovrätten. Nilsson returned to the chairman post in 2007 but later resigned again in 2008 after the club had failed to be promoted to Elitserien.

=== Malmö Arena ===
Percy Nilsson bought land at Hyllievång in Malmö from Malmö Stad for 250 million kronor in 2007. A couple of days later Nilsson sold the majority of the land to retail concern Steen & Strøm for as much as 570 million kronor. The profit was used by Nilsson to fund the construction of Malmö Arena.

=== Icecream truck ===
In the summer of 2013, Nilsson drilled in an icecream truck. He did so because he was annoyed by the sound that the truck made. The incident got a lot of attention in Sweden that year, and he was fined with 100 000 swedish crowns.
