= Simón (singer) =

Armenian singer-songwriter (born 1995)

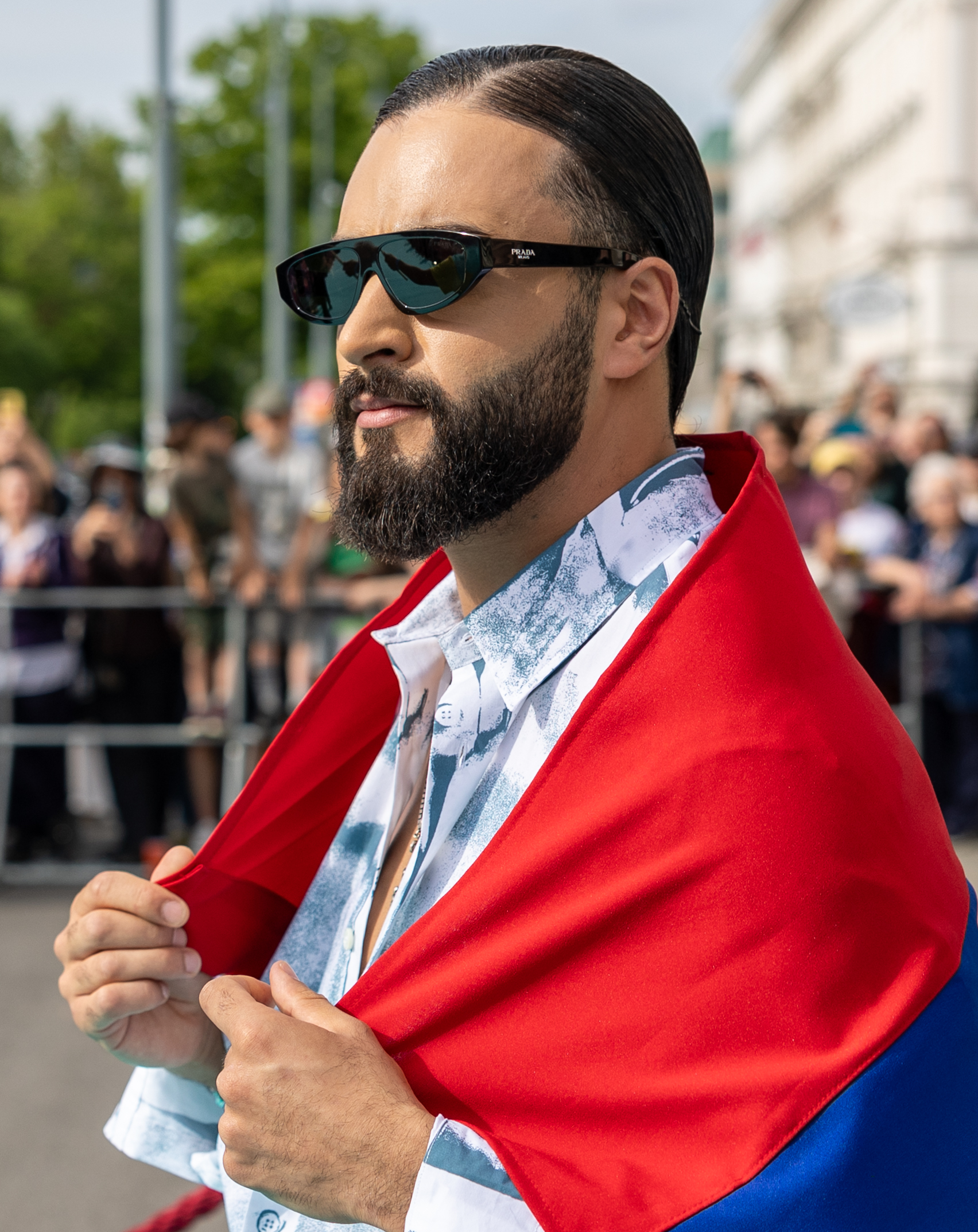
- Simón in 2026

Background information
- Also known as: Simon
- Born: Simon Hovhannisyan; 9 August 1994 (age 32); Hrazdan, Armenia
- Occupations: Singer-songwriter; dancer
- Years active: 2025–present

Simon Hovhannisyan (Armenian: Սիմոն Հովհաննիսյան; born 9 August 1994), previously known mononymously as Simon and currently as Simón (stylised in all caps), is an Armenian singer-songwriter and dancer. He represented Armenia in the Eurovision Song Contest 2026 with the song "Paloma Rumba".

== Early life and education ==
Hovhannisyan was born on 9 August 1994 in Hrazdan, Armenia, to a family of doctors. He studied economics at the Armenian National Agrarian University; however, he did not pursue the field professionally, instead focusing on music and dance.

== Career ==
In 2012, he participated in the televised dance competition Parir te karogh es.

In February 2025, Simon was announced as a finalist of the 2025 edition of Depi Evratesil with the song "Ay paparey bye". In the final, held on 16 February, he won the international and national jury votes and placed fourth in the televote, finishing as the runner-up overall. He was selected by AMPTV to form part of the Armenian jury for the Eurovision Song Contest 2025. In June 2025, he was a finalist of the musical entertainment competition Yerku astgh in a duet with dancer Sona Yesyan.

On 9 March 2026, Armenian media outlet Hraparak reported that he had been internally selected to represent Armenia in the Eurovision Song Contest 2026. This was confirmed by AMPTV two days later with the release of Simón's competing entry, "Paloma Rumba". On 29 March 2026, he won the Revelation of the Year category at the Khazer Armenian Music Awards, organised by the Armenian National Music Academy. He failed to qualify from the second semi-final of Eurovision on 14 May 2026, placing 14th out of 15 entrants with 49 points.

== Personal life ==
He is married to singer and producer Anush Avagyan, with whom he has twin sons.

== Discography ==
Credits taken from Apple Music.

=== Singles ===
Title	Year	Album
"Ay paparey bye" (Այ պապարեյ)	2025	Non-album singles
"Paranoia"	2025	Non-album singles
"Paloma Rumba"	2026	Non-album singles

Awards and achievements
Preceded by Parg with "Survivor"	Armenia in the Eurovision Song Contest; 2026	Succeeded by TBD
