= Hyllie Water Tower =

Water tower in Malmö, Sweden

Coordinates: 55°33′54″N 12°58′44″E

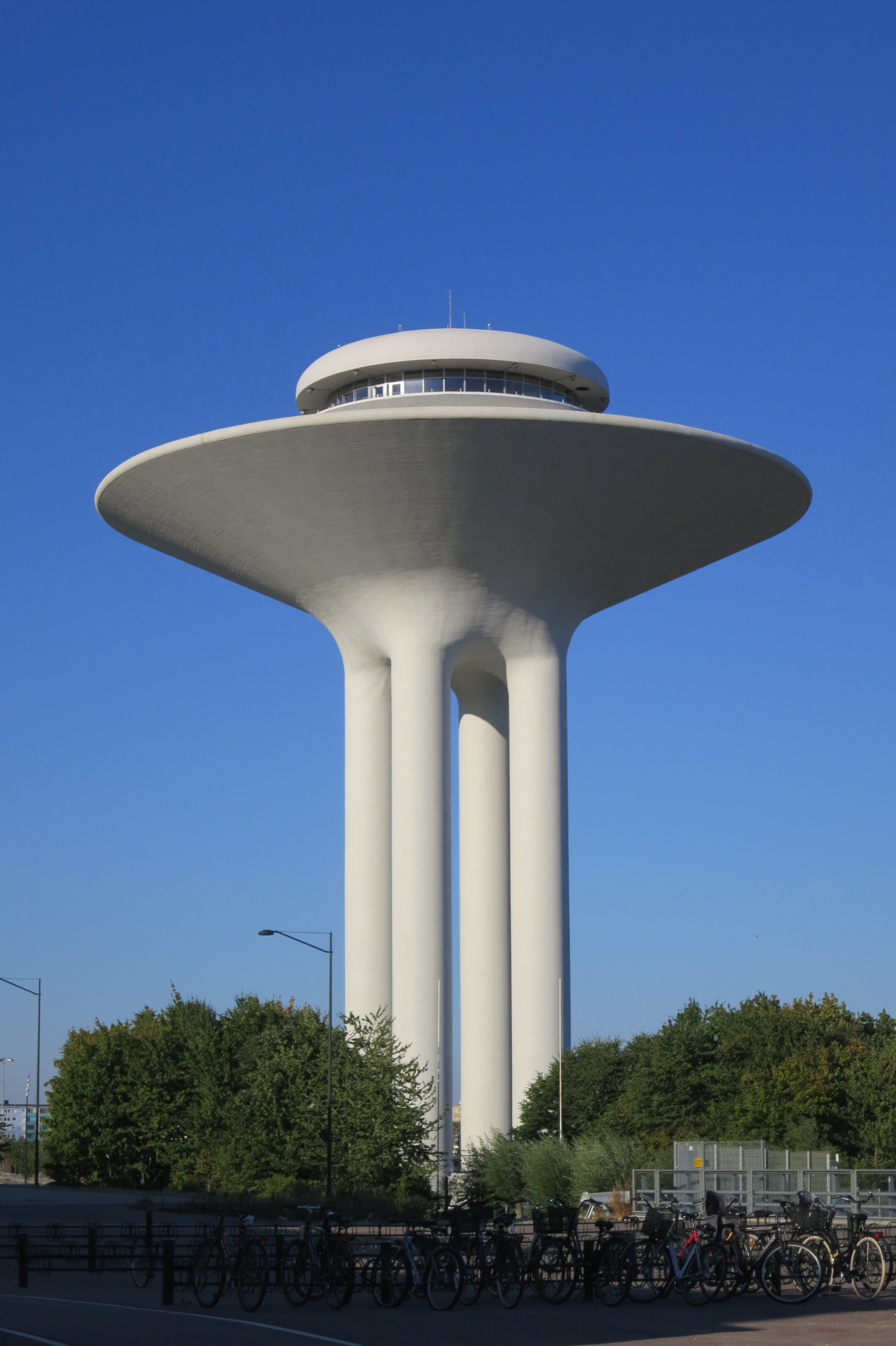
Hyllie Water Tower

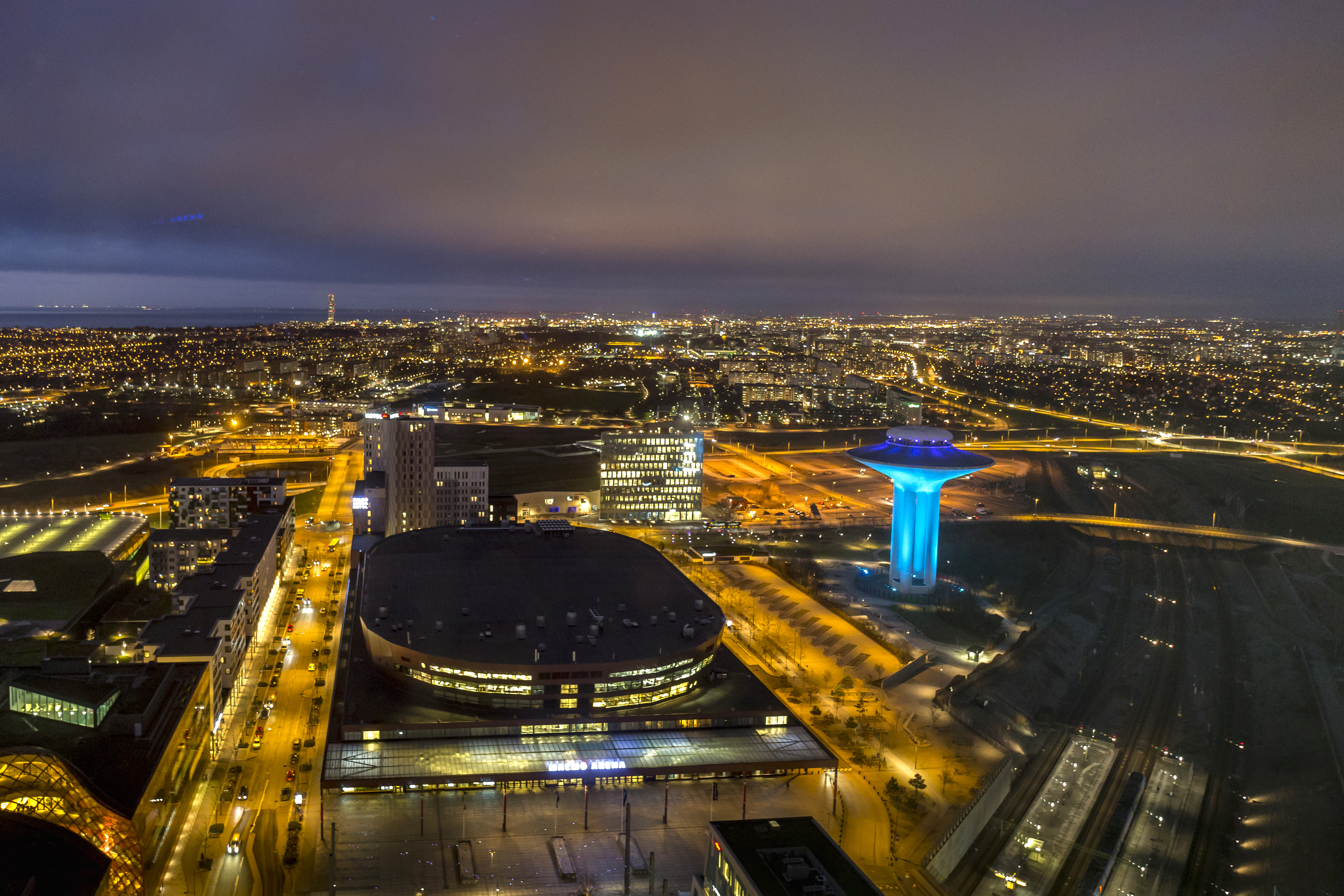
The water tower lit blue at night next to Malmö Arena

The Hyllie Water Tower, in the Hyllie district of the Swedish city of Malmö, was designed by the architect Karl Ivar Stål for Kjessler & Mannerstråle (now part of WSP Sweden) and completed in 1973. The tower is white and has the shape of a flying saucer. It is 62 metres (203 ft) high and holds 10,200 cubic metres (360,000 cu ft) of water. It is operated by the local water organisation for southeastern Skåne, VA SYD, and has a small public park at its base.

It is Malmö's newest water tower, and its design the result of the winning proposal in an architectural competition. The proposal called "Drabant" was carried out by Kjessler & Mannerstråle from Stockholm. Its construction cost was 8.6 million SEK. Hyllie Water Tower, which is by the Øresundståg railway line and one of the first things which can be seen after entering Sweden from Denmark, is a popular Malmö symbol and is lit blue at night, or other colours for special occasions. The ground level is about 21 metres (69 ft) above sea level.

Until 1996, a restaurant was housed at its top. After this moved, the room was used from 1998 to 2008 for educational displays.

From previously standing alone in agricultural landscapes, the water tower has become the centre of the new Hyllievång local centre and is now surrounded by new buildings such as Malmö Arena, the Emporia shopping centre and the Citytunneln, with Hyllie station to its immediate south. The water tower is protected by several safety devices and has a high fence around it.
