= Brunette (singer) =

Armenian singer-songwriter

Brunette Բրյունետ
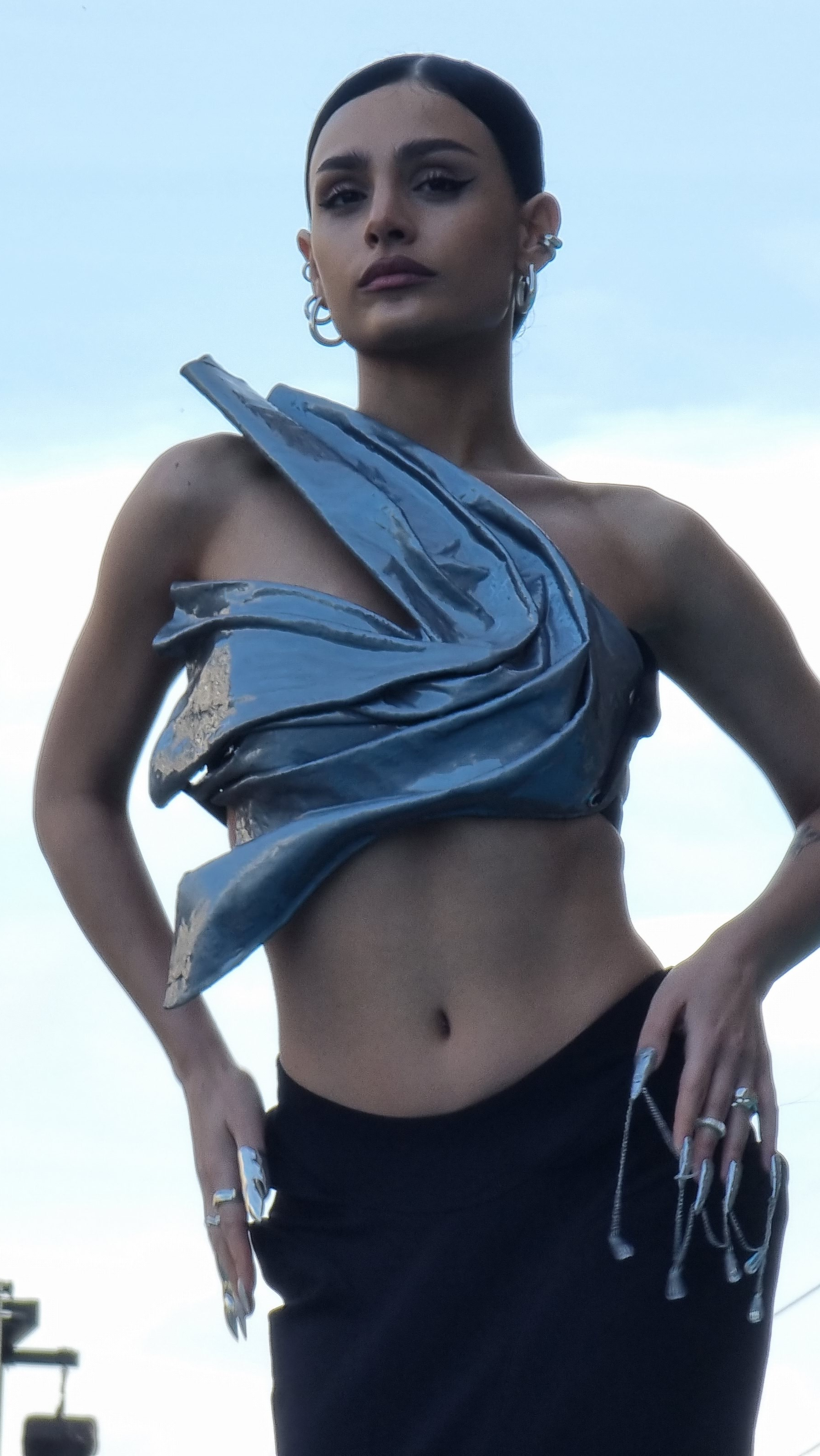
- Brunette in 2023

Background information
- Also known as: Brunette
- Born: Elen Yeremyan; 27 May 2001 (age 25); Yerevan, Armenia
- Genres: Pop
- Occupations: Singer; songwriter
- Years active: 2019–present

Elen Yeremyan (Armenian: Էլեն Երեմյան; born 27 May 2001), known professionally as Brunette (Armenian: Բրյունետ), is an Armenian singer-songwriter. She represented Armenia in the Eurovision Song Contest 2023 with the song "Future Lover", finishing in 14th place.

== Career ==
Brunette has been singing since the age of four and writing music since the age of fifteen.

Brunette released her debut single "Love the Way You Feel" at the age of 18 in collaboration with Nvak Foundation in September 2019. She later became a member of Project 12, a Yerevan-based musical collective performing at night clubs. Brunette is also a member of the girl group "En aghjiknery" (ThoseGirlz), which is known for the 2022 single "Menq". In 2022, Brunette released the singles "Gisher", "Smoke Break" and "Bac kapuyt achqerd"; the latter of the two went viral on social media.

On 1 February 2023, it was announced that Brunette was internally chosen to represent Armenia in the Eurovision Song Contest 2023. Her Eurovision song "Future Lover" was released on 15 March 2023. Brunette performed at the second semi-final on 11 May 2023, placing sixth and qualifying for the final. She ultimately placed 14th, with a score of 122 points, in the final on 13 May 2023.

In May 2024, Brunette was selected to announce Armenia's jury points at the Eurovision Song Contest 2024.

On 16 February 2025, Brunette performed her songs Future Lover, No Energy and Superstar Illness at the Armenian Selection for Eurovision 2025.

== Discography ==
=== Studio albums ===
| Title | Details |
|---|---|
| Love Reversed | Released: 5 November 2025; Label: Self-released; Formats: Digital download, streaming |

=== Singles ===
==== As lead artist ====
List of singles as lead artist, showing year released and album name
| Title | Year | Peak chart positions | Album or EP |
| Title | Year | LTU | Album or EP |
|---|---|---|---|
| "Love the Way You Feel" | 2019 | — | Non-album singles |
| "Uzum em urishin" | 2020 | — | Non-album singles |
| "Gisher" | 2022 | — | Non-album singles |
| "Smoke Break" | 2022 | — | Non-album singles |
| "Bac kapuyt achqerd" | 2022 | — | Non-album singles |
| "Future Lover" | 2023 | 21 | Non-album singles |
| "Dimak" | 2023 | — | Non-album singles |
| "Holiday Nostalgia" | 2023 | — | Non-album singles |
| "Aynpes uzum em" | 2023 | — | Non-album singles |
| "Hima tsurt a" | 2023 | — | Non-album singles |
| "Arev es" (with Parg) | 2024 | — | Non-album singles |
| "Superstar Illness" | 2024 | — | Non-album singles |
| "U De Mi or" | 2024 | — | Non-album singles |
| "No Energy" | 2024 | — | Non-album singles |
| "Superstar Illness (Another Version)" | 2024 | — | Non-album singles |
| "Love Reversed" | 2025 | — | Love Reversed |
| "Try" | 2025 | — | Non-album singles |
| "Ampits maqur" | 2025 | — | Non-album singles |
"—" denotes a recording that did not chart or was not released in that territory.

==== As featured artist ====
| Title | Year | Album or EP |
|---|---|---|
| "Menk'" (Yellowheart. featuring Brunette, Meghu, and ThoseGirlz) | 2022 | Non-album singles |
| "404: Love Not Found" (Kiaro featuring Brunette) | 2025 | Non-album singles |
| "Zhamanak kang ar" (Kami Friends featuring Brunette) | 2026 | Non-album singles |

=== Other appearances ===
| Title | Year | Album or EP |
|---|---|---|
| "Love the Way You Feel" | 2020 | Roses |
| "Qele Qele" | 2020 | I Cannot Come Out and Play |

Awards and achievements
| Preceded by Rosa Linn with "Snap" | Armenia in the Eurovision Song Contest; 2023 | Succeeded by Ladaniva with "Jako" |
