= Malmö Arena =

Multi-use indoor arena in Malmö, Sweden

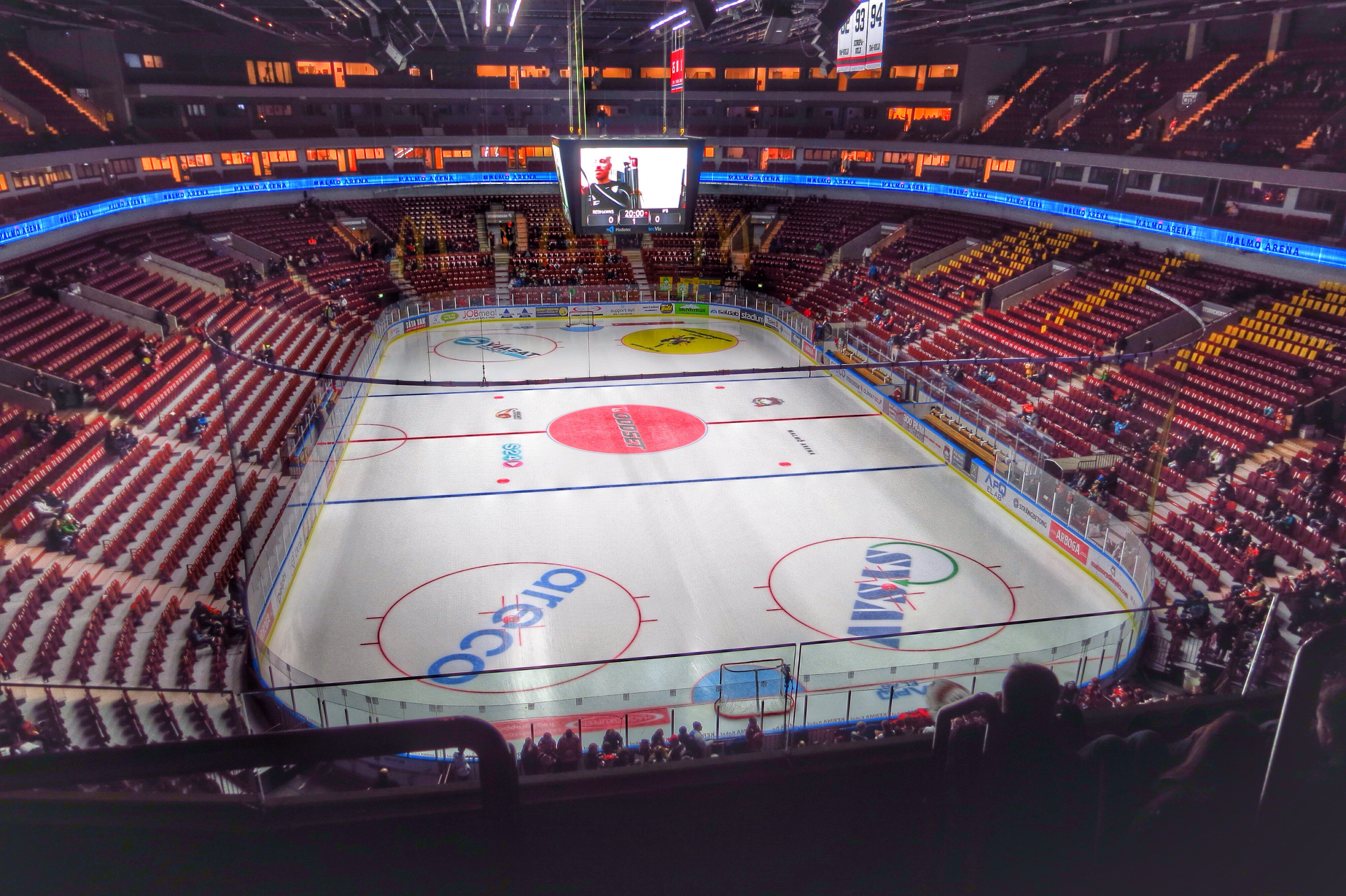
- Malmö Arena with its ice hockey rink set-up seen in January 2014
- Interactive map of Malmö Arena
- Address: Arenagatan 15
- Location: Hyllie, Malmö, Sweden
- Coordinates: 55°33′55″N 12°58′34″E
- Owner: Doxa AB
- Capacity: Sports: 12,600; Concerts: 15,500
- Executive suites: 72
- Surface: Versatile
- Acreage: 51,000 m^{2} (550,000 sq ft)
- Public transit: Hyllie Station

Construction
- Groundbreaking: 10 January 2007
- Opened: 6 November 2008
- Cost: SEK 750 million EUR € 85 million
- Architects: MM Matsson Konsult AB; Pöyry Architects; Wingårdh arkitektkontor BBB Architects
- Structural engineer: Byggteknik i Skåne
- Main contractor: Parkfast Arena AB

Tenant
- Malmö Redhawks (2008–present)

Website
- www.malmoarena.com

Malmö Arena is a multi-purpose indoor arena in Malmö, Sweden, and the venue for home games of the Swedish Hockey League team Malmö Redhawks. It is the largest arena in the SHL, and the second-largest indoor arena in Sweden. Apart from hosting Redhawks hockey matches, the arena is a significant venue for team handball, floorball, concerts, and other events. It has also hosted indoor athletics. Owned and operated by Parkfast AB, the arena was designed by Mats Matson of MM Matsson Konsult AB, Hannu Helkiö of Pöyry Architects, and Gert Wingårdh of Wingårdh arkitektkontor. Naming rights for the venue are owned by Malmö Stad, in a ten-year contract, agreed in 2007. The venue hosted the 2014 World Junior Ice Hockey Championships from 26 December 2013 to 5 January 2014. It hosted the Eurovision Song Contest between 14 and 18 May 2013, and hosted the same event again between 7 and 11 May 2024.

With a capacity of 12,600 for sports and 15,500 for concerts, Malmö Arena is the second-largest indoor arena in Sweden, only trailing the Avicii Arena, located in Stockholm, and is currently the biggest venue in the Swedish Hockey League. The attendance record for concerts at Malmö Arena is 11,300, set by a Lady Gaga concert on 19 November 2010. The venue attendance record for ice hockey was set on 12 November 2008, when Malmö Redhawks hosted Leksands IF in front of 13,247 people. Ground was broken on 10 January 2007, and the arena was inaugurated on 6 November 2008. The final construction cost for the arena was 750 million SEK. The arena is located about 80 m (260 ft) from Hyllie railway station, from where there are rail and bus connections to Malmö Central Station, Copenhagen Airport, and Copenhagen Central Station.

== History ==
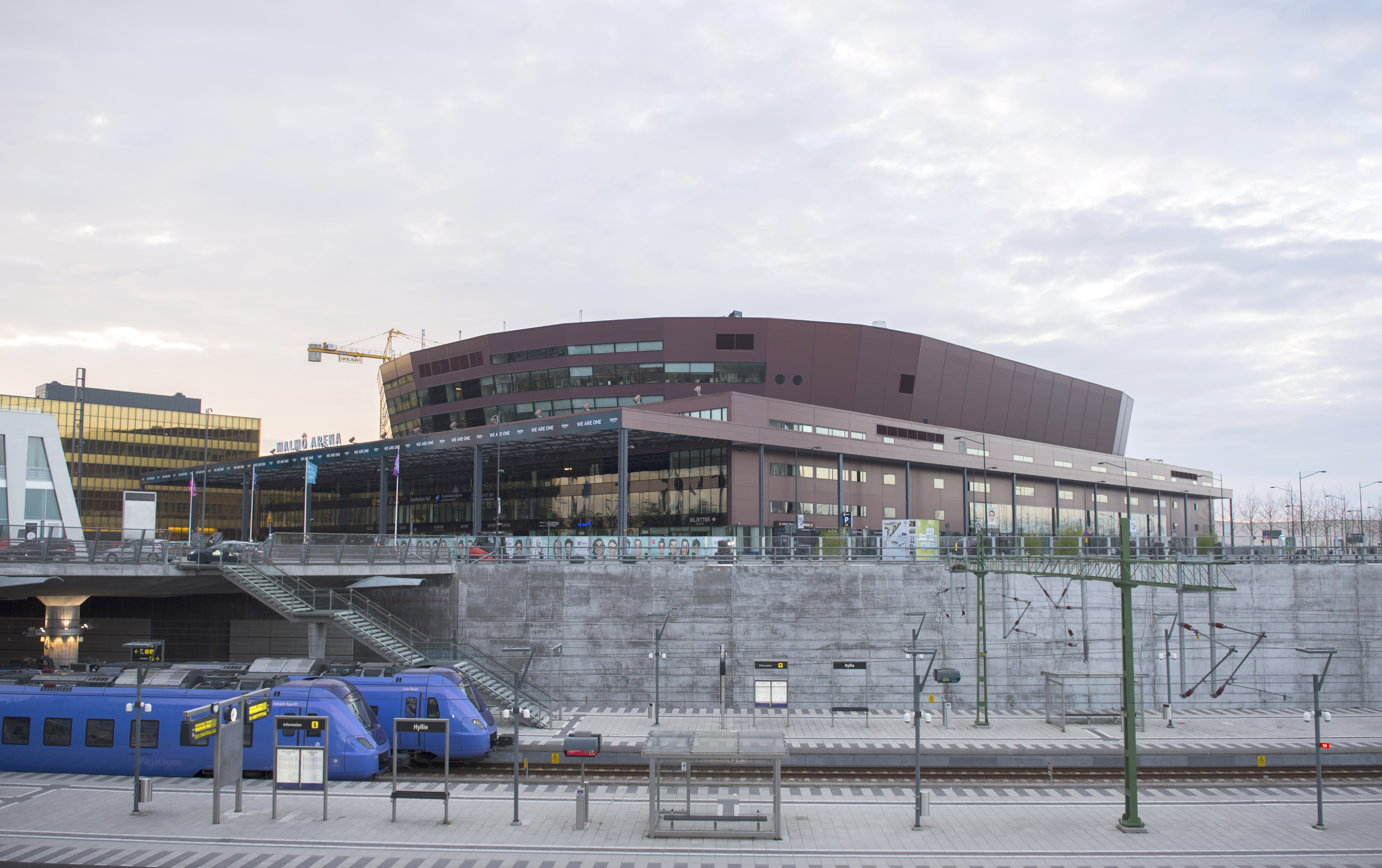
Malmö Arena, next to Hyllie railway station

In spite of being the third most populous city in Sweden, Malmö had often fallen short of the possibility of hosting larger concert and music events as the city lacked a suitable indoor arena. When the City Tunnel project was initiated by Malmö Stad in the late 1990s, the city began to plan a new district in Hyllievång. This led to the decision to build Hyllie station in 2001, as a part of the tunnel project, to boost the development of the new district. The ice hockey team Malmö Redhawks, as the proposed main tenant of the new arena, was initially uncertain of the new project, wanting to renovate its present home venue, the Malmö Isstadion, instead of moving to an entirely new arena. However, the Redhawks were convinced when Percy Nilsson of Parkfast AB contributed seven million kronor to help with their financial situation.

The decision to build an arena in the area was first presented by Nilsson in May 1997, and developed further over the following decade. The permit to start building Malmö Arena was granted in September 2006, and the first sod was turned on 10 January 2007 by Nilsson, hockey players Pekka Lindmark, Juha Riihijärvi, and Carl Söderberg, and two politicians from Malmö Stad. The main contractors for the building of the arena were Parkfast AB, with the collaboration of the structural engineer Byggteknik i Skåne. The arena was designed by Mats Matson of MM Matsson Konsult AB, Hannu Helkiö of Pöyry Architects, and Gert Wingårdh of Wingårdh arkitektkontor. The final construction cost for the arena was 750 million kronor – 100 million kronor over budget because of additions to the initial plan. The arena was entirely financed by Percy Nilsson of Parkfast AB. Malmö Arena was inaugurated on 6 November 2008 with a large concert featuring a variety of artists, among them Robyn, Helen Sjöholm, Sanne Salomonsen, and Jill Johnson.

The name of the arena was discussed during 2007, with Malmö Arena or Hyllie Arena discussed as potential options. The naming rights were eventually sold to Malmö Stad for 10 years in a deal worth 50 million kronor. Nilsson wished for the arena to have "Malmö" in its name as the new association football stadium in the city, Swedbank Stadion, did not.

=== Sports ===
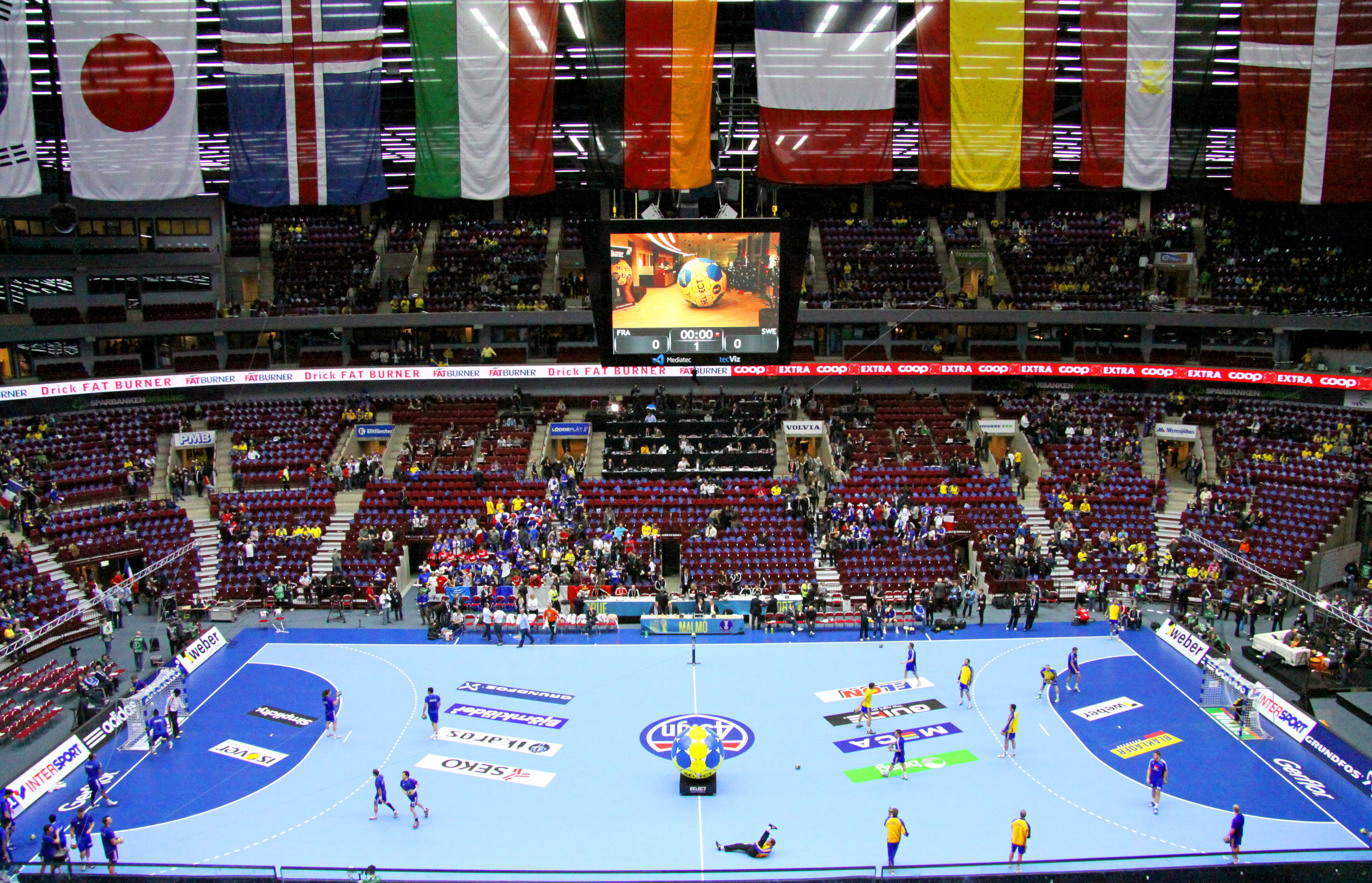
Malmö Arena during the 2011 World Men's Handball Championships

Malmö Arena has hosted Redhawks ice hockey games since 2008, replacing their former home, Malmö Isstadion. The team plays in the SHL, the first tier of Swedish ice hockey. The Redhawks play 26 regular season games per season at the arena making them the arena's sole regular tenant. Malmö Arena was the main venue for the 2014 World Junior Ice Hockey Championships.

In addition to ice hockey, Malmö Arena hosted 22 matches of the 2011 World Men's Handball Championships, including the bronze medal match, and the final, between France and Denmark, which was won by France. Malmö Arena hosted the playoff finals of the men's and women's Swedish national team handball championship in 2010 and 2012. Malmö Arena was also scheduled to host the 2013 finals, but they were moved elsewhere when the arena was chosen as the host for the 2013 Eurovision Song Contest, which was to take place five days after the handball finals. In floorball, the arena served as the venue for the 2010–11 and 2011–12 Swedish Super League finals. It was used again for the 2023 World Men's Handball Championship with Sweden co-hosting alongside Poland.

Malmö Arena was used for athletics in February 2009, when the arena hosted "Malmö Indoor Gala", a newly founded indoor athletics competition, organised by Malmö Allmänna Idrottsförening (MAI). Several international athletes were invited to compete, including pole vault Olympic champion Yelena Isinbayeva, who turned down the invitation due to illness. Many other major athletes declined their invitations for a variety of reasons, causing the competition to attract only meagre interest from the public. No more than 7,000 spectators attended, making the competition a financial failure. The competition was therefore not held again.

=== Other events ===
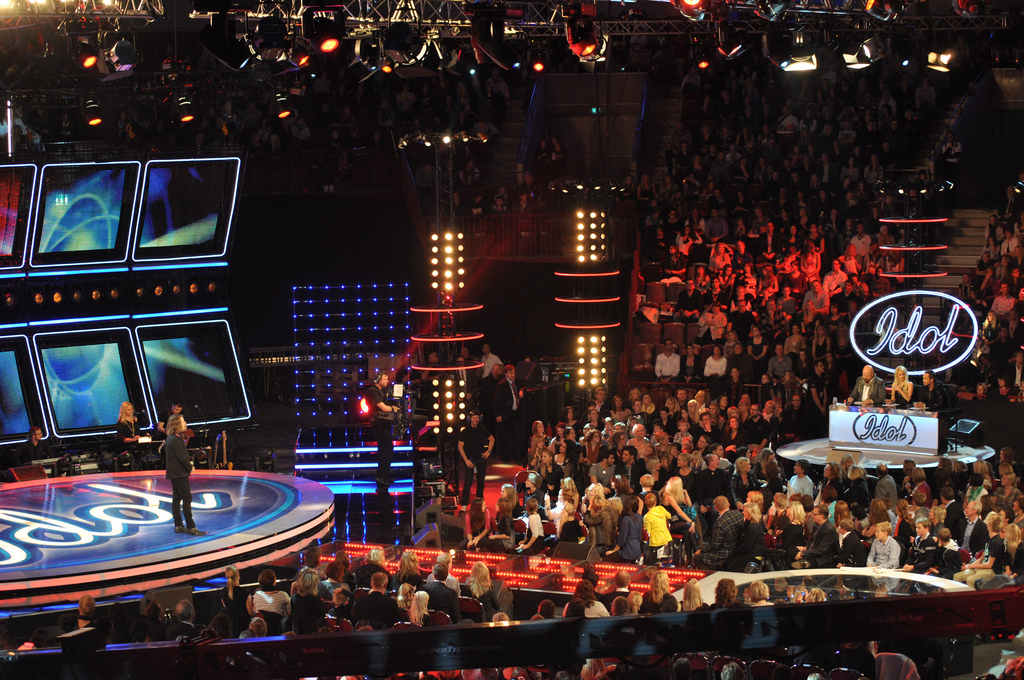
Swedish Idol at Malmö Arena in 2009

Malmö Arena has hosted several concerts as well as other music events such as Christmas shows and musicals. Britney Spears performed at the arena on 11 October 2011 during her Femme Fatale Tour. Rihanna was scheduled to bring her Loud Tour to Malmö Arena on 31 October 2011, but the event was cancelled with only a few hours' notice because of health issues, although she eventually performed at the venue in August 2016. Other international artists who have performed at the arena are Bob Dylan, Cliff Richard, Tom Jones, Lady Gaga, and many others. Lady Gaga's show holds the attendance record for concerts at the arena, having drawn a crowd of 11,300; the cancelled Rihanna concert would have set a new record with 11,700 tickets sold. Heats of Melodifestivalen, Sweden's national song competition and selection for the Eurovision Song Contest, were held at the arena between 2009 and 2020, as well as in 2023 and 2024. It also hosted Fotbollsgalan, Sweden's award ceremony for domestic football, in 2009 and 2010. Religious events were hosted during the 499th anniversary of the Protestant Reformation in the special Catholic–Lutheran dialogue with Pope Francis and Bishop Munib Younan, held on 31 October 2016.

The arena was selected to host the Eurovision Song Contest 2013, with the other contenders for the event being the Friends Arena in Stockholm and Scandinavium in Gothenburg. Due to the fact that Stockholm's Globe Arena was booked for the 2013 IIHF World Championship, Sveriges Television (SVT) decided to choose Malmö Arena as host venue due to its good transport links, as well as SVT's previous experiences hosting Melodifestivalen heats at the arena. SVT also expressed the desire to host the contest at a slightly smaller venue and city than previous years. In July 2023, it was chosen to host the 2024 edition of the contest.

== Structure and facilities ==
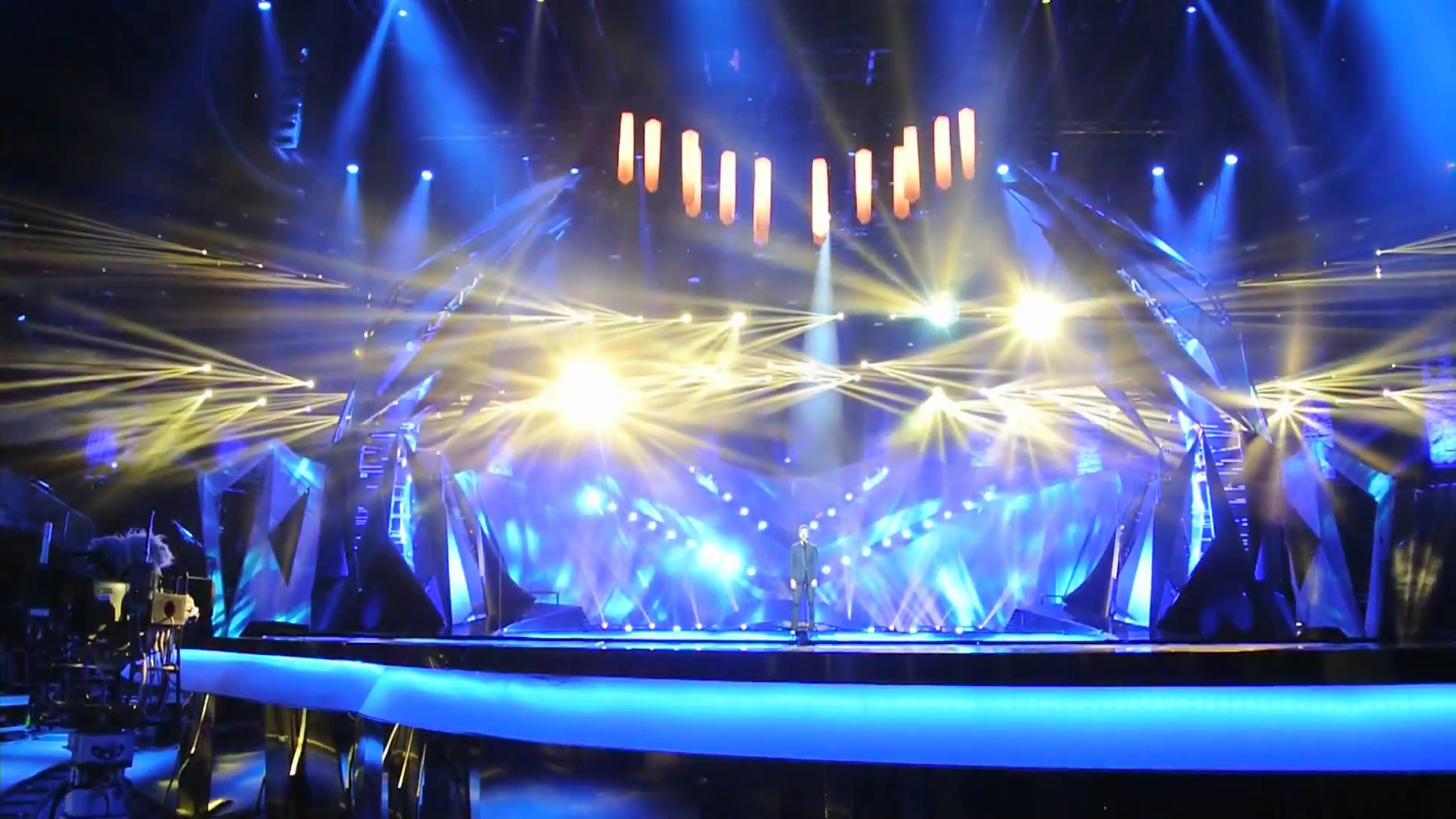
The Eurovision Song Contest 2013 at Malmö Arena

Malmö Arena has an overall capacity of 12,600 for sporting events; for concerts and other events, the capacity can be as low as 500 or as high as 15,500, depending on where the stage is placed. The lower tier of the northern stand of the arena can be turned into terracing for sports. The arena can also be used for dancing and dining: the capacity is 5,000 for dancing, and between 50 and 2,000 for dining events. The arena has 72 luxury suites, which can be rented for different events. Of these, 60 have an area of between 27 m^{2} (290 sq ft) and 40 m^{2} (430 sq ft), and 12 have an area of 70 m^{2} (750 sq ft). There are also two restaurants and four bars in the arena, with a total capacity of 3,250, 20 kiosks, and fast food locations. There are 370 toilets in the arena.

The floor area of the inner part of the arena is 3,200 m^{2} (34,000 sq ft) at its maximum, and the maximum ceiling height is 22.5 m (74 ft). The total floor area of the entire arena, including corridors and interior space, is 51,000 m^{2} (550,000 sq ft). There are a total of eight changing rooms for athletes and performers, two of which are adapted for use by the disabled. The southern part of the arena has offices on six different floors. Office space in the arena totals 7,950 m^{2} (85,600 sq ft). Its main tenant Malmö Redhawks and also other companies have offices in these areas.

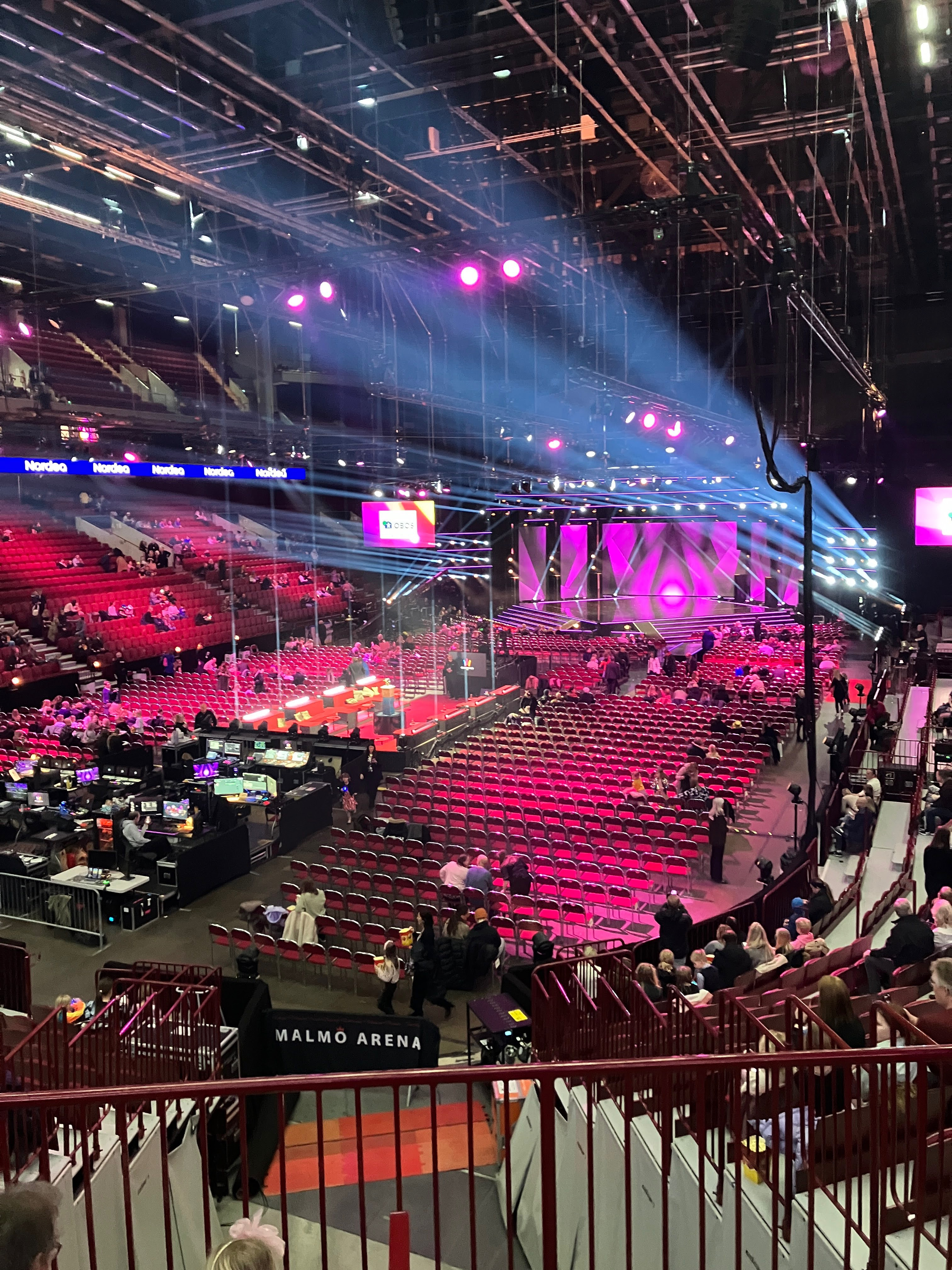
Malmö Arena during Melodifestivalen 2023

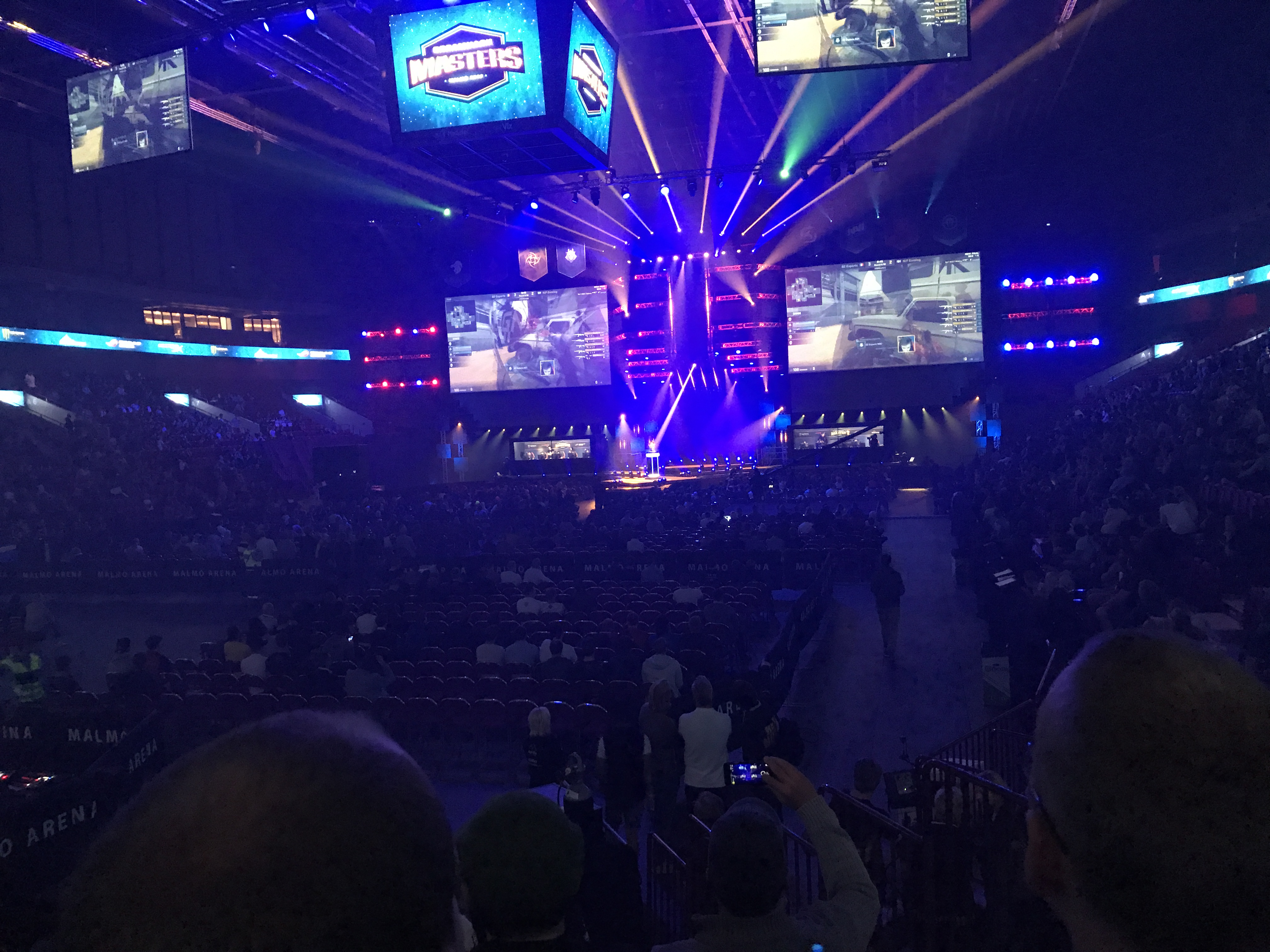
Malmö Arena during DreamHack Masters 2017

The arena has a stand on each of the floor area's four sides. The northern part of the arena has two tiers for seating, while the south stand has only one tier for seating; the upper tier is reserved for executive suites and restaurant space. The southern stand also has 53 disabled places, with the same number of spaces for their companions. There are 36 entrances to the inner part of the arena. In the northern part of the arena, there are facilities for ice hockey practice.

Both the upper tier and the lower tier of the arena concourse have kiosks located at the east and west ends. The lower tier also has bars located at the east and west ends, and an additional sports bar located at the north end. At the area of the luxury suites, one level above the sports bar in the north end, is Percys Restaurang & Bar, a restaurant with a view out towards the arena at a seating capacity of 650 guests. The south end of the concourse also features a souvenir shop for event merchandise purposes.

The arena also features an indoor ice rink training facility located to the north of its main concourse. The training facility was originally located and visible outside the arena building, but has since been covered by real estate. Next to the training facility, also located north of the main concourse, is the Best Western Malmö Arena Hotel – a 16-story building and part of the Malmö Arena brand with conference rooms, a restaurant, a gym and a – for specific occasions – direct entry to the panorama restaurant inside the arena's north stand with a view over the arena bowl. The shopping mall Emporia is located west of the arena across the street.

== Transport ==
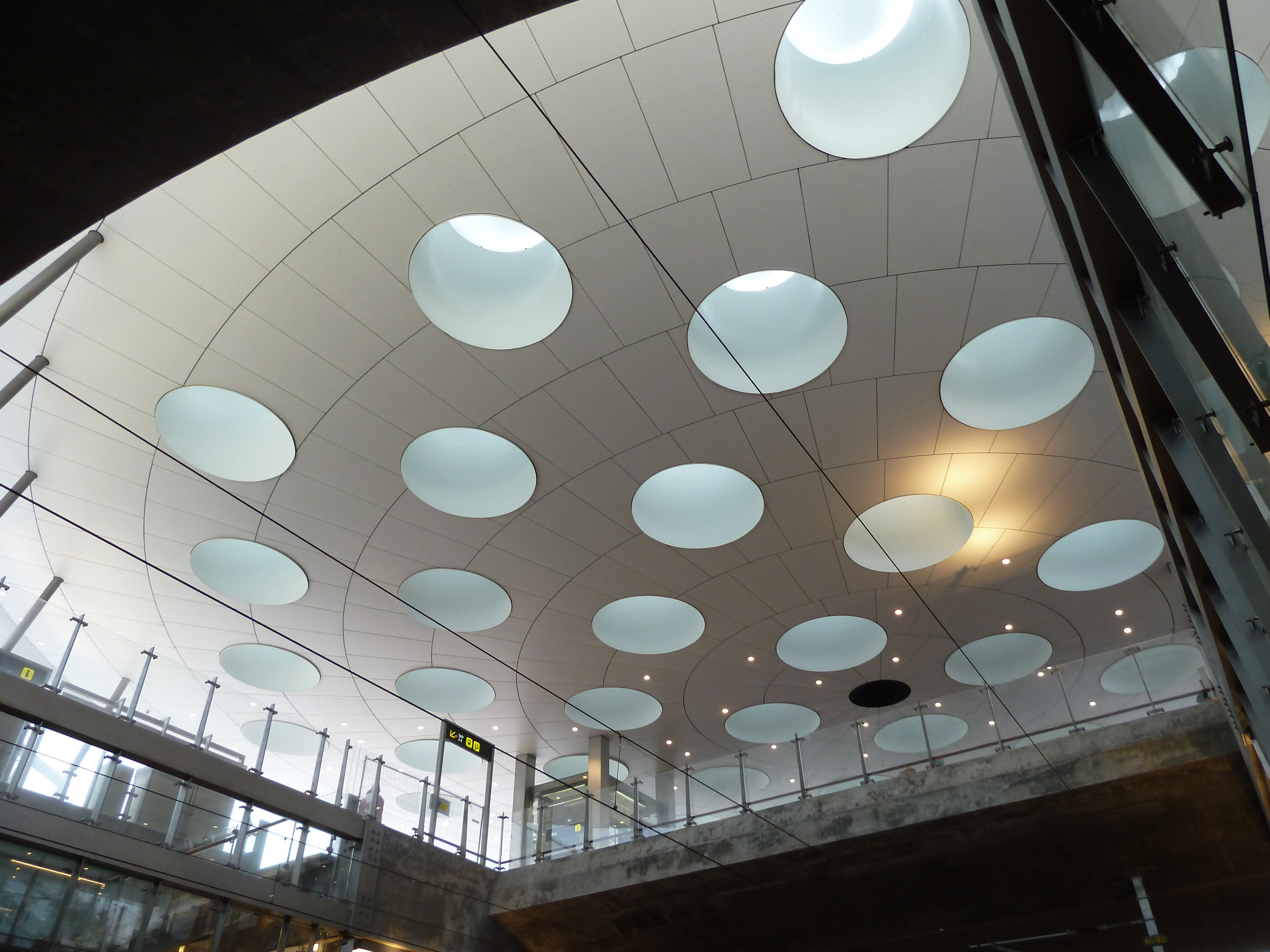
Hyllie, the closest railway station to Malmö Arena

Malmö Arena is currently served by Malmö bus lines 6, 8, 33, as well as several regional bus lines, all of which stop close to the arena. The stadium is also located close to the partially underground railway station Hyllie, which opened in December 2010 as a part of the Citytunnel project. The station is served by Pågatåg and Öresund Trains, and is connected to most parts of the Øresund Region. From Hyllie railway station, spectators can reach Malmö Central Station in 7 minutes, or Copenhagen Airport in 12 minutes.

Parking is available on the western, northern, and eastern sides of the arena. In total, 3,400 parking spaces are available. These areas are operated by Malmö Stad. There is also a parking garage named "P-huset Hyllie" located on the eastern side of Hyllie station. This garage is open all hours and can accommodate 1,400 vehicles. There is also an interior parking garage in the arena with room for 200 vehicles, and an area reserved for the parking of up to 1,000 bicycles is located on the eastern side of the arena. There are areas for charter buses as well as taxis beside the arena's main and side entrances.

Events and tenants
Preceded by Arena Zagreb; Zagreb	World Men's Handball Championship; Final Venue; 2011	Succeeded by Palau Sant Jordi; Barcelona
Preceded by Baku Crystal Hall; Baku	Eurovision Song Contest; Venue; 2013	Succeeded by B&W Hallerne; Copenhagen
Preceded by Ufa Arena; Ufa	World Junior Ice Hockey Championships; Final Venue; 2014	Succeeded by Air Canada Centre; Toronto
Preceded by Liverpool Arena; Liverpool	Eurovision Song Contest; Venue; 2024	Succeeded by St. Jakobshalle; Basel
