= Future Lover =

2023 single by Brunette

Single by Brunette
- Language: English, Armenian
- Released: 15 March 2023
- Length: 2:46
- Label: Independent
- Songwriter: Elen Yeremyan

Brunette singles chronology
"Bac kapuyt achqerd" (2022)	"Future Lover" (2023)	"Dimak" (2023)

Music video
- "Future Lover" on YouTube

Eurovision Song Contest 2023 entry
- Country: Armenia
- Artist: Brunette
- Composer: Elen Yeremyan
- Lyricist: Elen Yeremyan

Finals performance
- Semi-final result: 6th
- Semi-final points: 99
- Final result: 14th
- Final points: 122

Entry chronology
- ◄ "Snap" (2022)
- "Jako" (2024) ►

Official performance video
- "Future Lover" (Second Semi-Final) on YouTube "Future Lover" (Grand Final) on YouTube

"Future Lover" is a song by Armenian singer Brunette, released on 15 March 2023. The song represented Armenia in the Eurovision Song Contest 2023 after Brunette was internally selected by the Public Television Company of Armenia (AMPTV), the Armenian national broadcaster for the Eurovision Song Contest.

== Eurovision Song Contest ==
=== Internal selection ===
The Armenian entry for the Eurovision Song Contest 2023 was internally selected by AMPTV. On 25 January 2023, Armenian media reported that singer Brunette had been selected to represent the country with an R&B style song, though AMPTV did not comment. On 1 February 2023, AMPTV officially confirmed that Brunette would represent Armenia in the Eurovision Song Contest 2023. The singer stated that "I am happy to share the news with you. I just create music, and this time I will share it with the European audience!". Her Eurovision song "Future Lover" was released on Eurovision's YouTube channel on 15 March 2023. It was released on major streaming platforms five days later.

=== At Eurovision ===
According to Eurovision rules, all nations with the exceptions of the host country and the "Big Five" (France, Germany, Italy, Spain and the United Kingdom) are required to qualify from one of two semi-finals in order to compete for the final; the top 10 countries from each semi-final progress to the final. The European Broadcasting Union (EBU) split up the competing countries into six different pots based on voting patterns from previous contests, with countries with favourable voting histories put into the same pot. On 31 January 2023, an allocation draw was held, which placed each country into one of the two semi-finals, and determined which half of the show they would perform in. Armenia has been placed into the second semi-final, to be held on 11 May 2023, and has been scheduled to perform in the second position.

== Charts ==
Chart performance for "Future Lover"
Chart (2023)	Peak position
Lithuania (AGATA)	21
