= Paloma Rumba =

2026 single by Simón

Single by Simón
- Released: 11 March 2026
- Length: 2:38
- Songwriters: David Tserunyan; Eva Voskanyan; Lilit Navasardyan; Roza Kostandyan

Simón singles chronology
"Paranoia" (2025)	"Paloma Rumba" (2026)

Music video
- "Paloma Rumba" on YouTube

Eurovision Song Contest 2026 entry
- Country: Armenia
- Artist: Simón
- Languages: English

Finals performance
- Semi-final result: 14th
- Semi-final points: 49

Entry chronology
- ◄ "Survivor" (2025)

Official performance video
- "Paloma Rumba" (second semi-final) on YouTube

"Paloma Rumba" (lit. 'Dove Rumba') is a song by Armenian singer Simón. It was released on 11 March 2026 and represented Armenia at the Eurovision Song Contest 2026, and finished in fourteenth place in semi-final 2. It was co-written by David Tserunyan, Eva Voskanyan, Lilit Navasardyan, and Roza Kostandyan. The song lyrically details breaking free from routines, choosing passion, and freedom. It placed not qualifying for the final. It received mixed reviews from critics, describing it as a high-paced, grinding rock track with "Latin-Balkan fusion".

== Background and composition ==
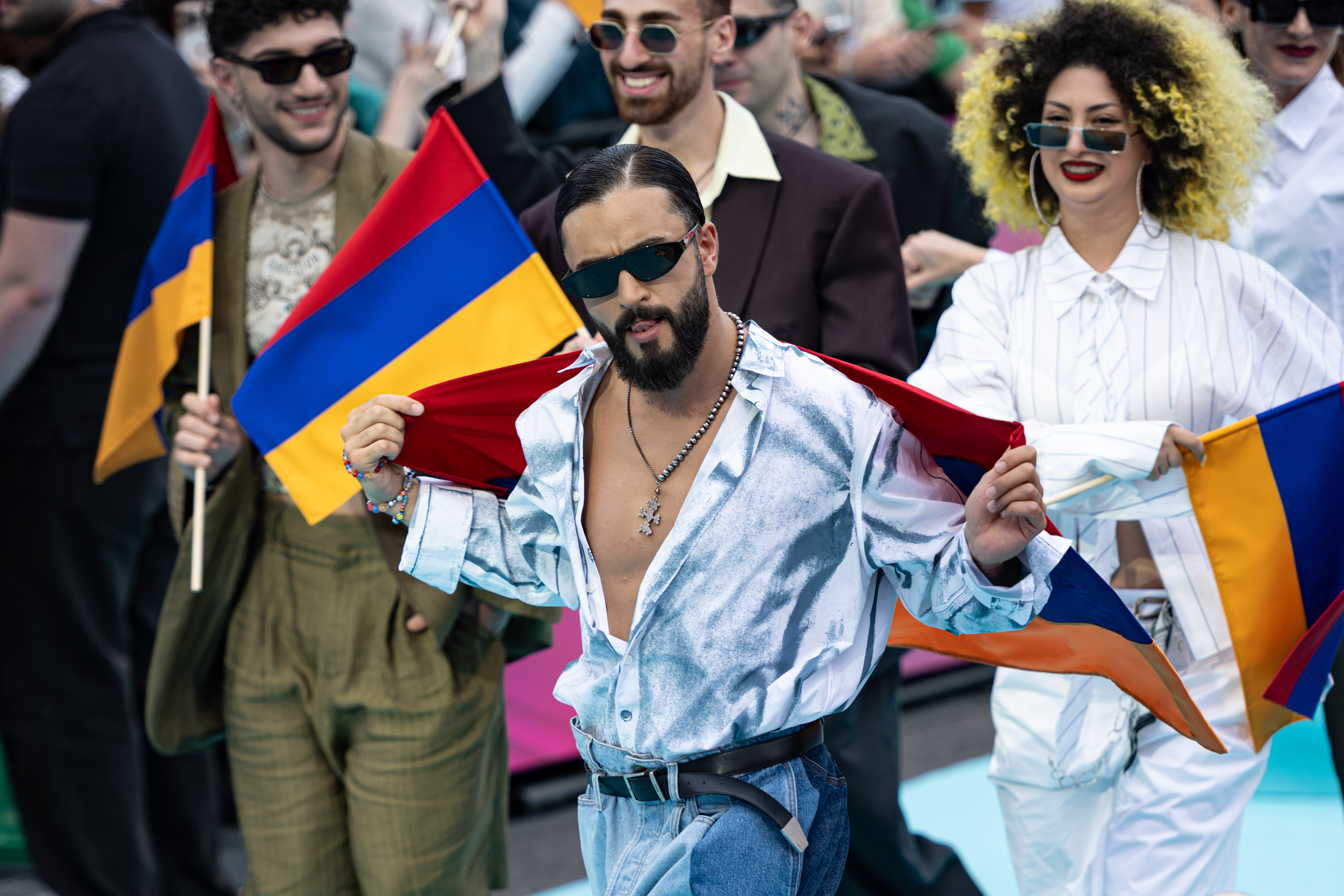
Simón at the opening ceremony of Eurovision 2026 on 10 May

"Paloma Rumba" was written by David Tserunyan; Eva Voskanyan; Lilit Navasardyan, a writer of numerous -Eurovision entries; and Roza Kostandyan, who had previously represented Armenia at the Eurovision Song Contest 2022. Navasardyan incorporated different Armenian instruments to create a unique sound, while Tserunyan and Kostandyan wrote the lyrics for the song in a day. In 2025, Simón participated in Depi Evratesil 2025, placing first in both national and international juries yet finishing in second place. The song was related to his participation there. Of his selection for Eurovision, he said, "For many years, I dreamed of performing on the big stage at the Eurovision Song Contest, and today my dream has finally come true. This moment is the result of years of hard work and unwavering belief",

According to the official Armenian Eurovision website, "Paloma Rumba" talks about "breaking free" from a "suffocating routine" and chasing your hopes and dreams. The title, translating to "Dove's Dance", according to the website, symbolizes "a dance for freedom", like a dove taking flight after being trapped for long. The story follows a character who quits his 9-to-5 job and chooses his "passion". According to Radio Free Europe/Radio Liberty Armenia, the song marks freedom, movement, and the need to walk along with the rhythm of life". The Public Radio of Armenia said that the song details a person staying true to himself by leaving office life, adding that, "at its core, 'Paloma Rumba' marks the moment when you say goodbye to the life that holds you back from walking in step with the rhythm of your heart".

== Music video and promotion ==
On 11 March, "Paloma Rumba" was announced as Armenia's entry; the music video was released the same day. Directed by Arthur Manukyan, produced by David Tserunyan, with cinematography by Artyom Abovyan, and choreography by Kristina Avagimyan, the video shows Simón returning to his accountancy job after his participation in the Armenian selection. However, instead of working, he searched previous Armenian Eurovision artists and planned his Eurovision return. As the tension gradually builds, he quits his job and follows his passion to return to Eurovision. The website Eurovision Armenia said, "throughout the video, everyday office moments are contrasted with flashes of imagination, performance, and memories of the stage". On 31 March, Simón was the last entrant announced in the Eurovision pre-party Eurovision in Concert lineup, marking 27 acts that participated in the pre-party.

== Critical reception ==
William Lee Adams of Wiwibloggs said that the song was "artistic", stating that the genre was "rock with a dance-ethnic undertone". Adams compared it to "Trenulețul", Moldova's 2022 entrant, with both being "high-octane and committed to themselves", and said that Paloma Rumba switched its genre throughout in a "consistent way". He added that Simón was "aware of the camera" while performing, with different choreographies in each part that fit the music "absolutely perfectly". Panorama.am said that the song shared its story through "humor, attitude, and explosive energy". Jon O'Brien of Vulture ranked "Paloma Rumba" 31st out of all 35 entries, describing it as a "breakneck-speed banger and an ode to freeing yourself from the shackles of the daily grind". He added that the music video presented the meaning as "abusing the office photocopier and covering yourself in Post-its", concluding it as a "total racket", but could finish higher than Rosa Linn's 20th place at Eurovision 2022.

Mark Savage of BBC described the song as one of two songs that say "take your job and shove it", describing the song as a "grinding rock trac.." Savage described the performance as "Simón flings around reams of paper as he marches (and backflips) towards the exit, accompanied by Armenian folk instruments like the duduk and the dohl". He added that it was "exhausting to listen to". Eva Frantz of Yle rated the song 6 out of 10, describing the pace as "high, maybe a little too high", adding that she had an ambivalent attitude to the song: "Sometimes I think it's great, so good with something fast-paced and fun. Other days I quickly skip it on the playlist and think no, no, I can handle that right now". Doron Lahav of ESC Beat said that the song had a "Latin-Balkan fusion", starting with a bright, mariachi-style trumpet fanfare with Simón opening the first verse with a smooth baritone. The beat turns snappier in the first pre-chorus, and then the explosive, celebratory chorus starts. The second verse maintained the momentum, Lahav said, and the bridge featured a guitar solo, with Lahav describing it as a "rhythmic highlight" of the song. Lahav concludes the review describing the song as a "crowd pleaser". In ESCBubble's Public Reacts for semi-final 2 utilizing polls, Armenia placed 14th out of the 15 total ranked songs.

== Eurovision Song Contest 2026 ==
=== Internal selection ===
The participating broadcaster for Armenia, AMPTV, was announced to be participating in the Eurovision Song Contest 2026 on 15 December 2025. According to AMPTV, a televised selection could not be made for each edition, so, due to Simón's 2nd place in the previous selection, he was invited by the broadcaster to participate in the contest. The song creation commenced shortly after. On 9 March 2026, Armenian Media Outlet Hraparak reported Simón would be representing Armenia at the 2026 Eurovision Song Contest. Furthermore, this was confirmed on 11 March 2026 when AMPTV announced Simón with his song "Paloma Rumba", as the competing entry for Armenia at the contest that year.

=== At Eurovision ===
The Eurovision Song Contest 2026 took place at Wiener Stadthalle in Vienna, Austria. The event featured two semi-finals on 12 and 14 May, and the grand final on 16 May 2026. In the allocation draw conducted on 12 January 2026, Armenia was assigned to compete in the second semi-final, performing in the former half of the show. It was later announced that Simón would perform 6th in the semi-final, after France's Monroe and before Switzerland's Veronica Fusaro.

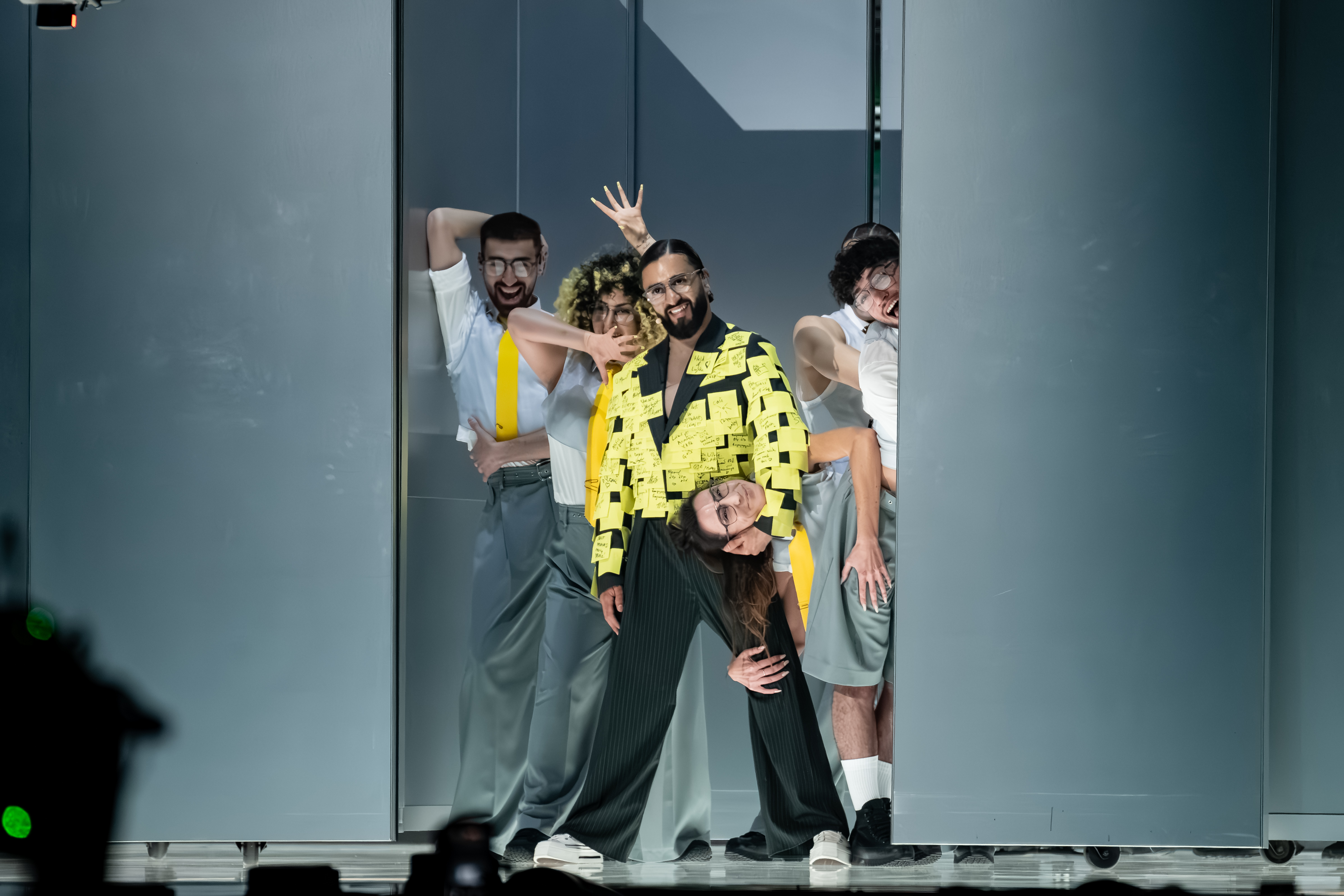
Simón performing "Paloma Rumba" in the Eurovision 2026 second semi-final

In his performance, Simón wore a jacket covered in sticky notes with different writings and drawings and a pair of gray trousers. His dancers, meanwhile, wear the same trousers but with short-sleeved shirts, yellow ties, and glasses. The first part of the song reveals Simón and his five dancers in an elevator. At some points, he was held upside down by two of his dancers. Nicole Postelnik of EuroMix described the choreography as "high energy" and the vocal stability as "excellent". She added that the performance a sense of "absolute chaos" while the camera moves rapidly with angles from the ceiling and the opposite side of the elevator. Eventually, Simón goes outside the elevator, revealing the full stage illuminated by numerous white lights syncing with the song's rhythm. Simón did backflips, took the camera in his hands once, and, in the end, did a victory pose on top of the dancers. Simón did not qualify for the grand final, gaining 14th out of 15 entries with 49 points: 30 from the jury and 19 from the televote. The highest points Armenia received from a country was 12 from Australia in the jury and 6 from France in the televote.

Yasmin Vince of the Daily Mirror commented on Simón's top removal: "He removed his top to reveal a see-through, cling film-like top. He proceeded to run around the stage looking as though he were topless". Eurovoix's Neil Farren said that the "camera cuts are as erratic as the choreography". Noy Yehoyada of EuroMix said that "It was a solid vocal effort—certainly an improvement over the afternoon rehearsal—and the whole thing looks very sharp for the cameras", adding that the choreography was wild. William Lee Adams of Wiwibloggs said that the performance presented a story that "you can follow [...] quite easily". Suzanne Adams, another Wiwibloggs reporter, questioned why he was covered in post-it notes when he was already leaving the office, but added that she loved the overhead shot with Simón and his companions dancing. Liam Kelly of The Daily Telegraph said Armenia's non-qualification was one of the two surprising ones, alongside Luxembourg.

== Credits and personnel ==
Credits are adapted from Apple Music (Great Britain).

- Lilit Navasardyan - background vocals, songwriter, producer
- Rosa Linn - songwriter
- David Tserunyan - songwriter, producer
- Eva Voskanyan - songwriter
