= Jako (song) =

2023 single by Ladaniva

Single by Ladaniva

from the album Ladaniva
- Released: 29 September 2023
- Genre: Armenian folk music
- Length: 2:25
- Label: Jiguli; PIAS
- Songwriters: Audrey Leclercq; Jaklin Baghdasaryan; Louis Thomas
- Producer: Jasper Maekelberg

Ladaniva singles chronology
"Je t'aime tellement" (2023)	"Jako" (2023)	"Here's to You Ararat" (2024)

Music video
- "Jako" on YouTube

Eurovision Song Contest 2024 entry
- Country: Armenia
- Artist: Ladaniva
- Language: Armenian
- Composers: Audrey Leclercq; Jaklin Baghdasaryan; Louis Thomas
- Lyricists: Jaklin Baghdasaryan; Louis Thomas

Finals performance
- Semi-final result: 3rd
- Semi-final points: 137
- Final result: 8th
- Final points: 183

Entry chronology
- ◄ "Future Lover" (2023)
- "Survivor" (2025) ►

Official performance video
- "Jako" (Second Semi-Final) on YouTube "Jako" (Grand Final) on YouTube

"Jako" (Armenian: Ժակո, pronounced [ʒɑˈkɔ]) is a song by French-Armenian world music duo Ladaniva. The song was originally released on 29 September 2023 on the duo's debut self-titled album as a track, and was written by Audrey Leclercq, Jaklin Baghdasaryan, and Louis Thomas. It represented Armenia in the Eurovision Song Contest 2024, where it placed in 8th at the grand final with 183 points.

== Background and composition ==
"Jako" was written by the duo together with Audrey Leclercq, and produced by Jasper Maekelberg. The title of the song was inspired by band member Jaklin Baghdasaryan's nickname. The song was described as an account of Jaklin’s childhood and the subsequent feeling of society forcing her to conform relating to clothing and her behavior. She both criticizes and challenges it, stating that she instead wants people to find their "real, wild, unapologetic selves".

== Music video and promotion ==
Along with the duo's official confirmation of their Eurovision song, an accompanying music video directed by Arthur Manukyan was released on the same day. According to ESC United, the video was a tribute to Armenian filmmaker Sergei Parajanov, with outfits for the duo being designed by Mary Stepanyan and Astghik Samvelyan. To further promote the song, they announced their intents to participate in Pre-Party ES on 30 March 2024, a Eurovision pre-party.

== Critical reception ==
In a Wiwibloggs review containing several reviews from several critics, the song was rated 6.27 out of 10 points, earning 25th out of the 37 songs competing in the Eurovision Song Contest 2024 on the site's annual ranking. Another review conducted by ESC Bubble that contained reviews from a combination of readers and juries rated the song fourth out of the 16 songs "Jako" was competing against in its the Eurovision semi-final. Jon O'Brien, a writer for Vulture, ranked the song 13th overall, stating that the song was a "vibrant mix of traditional folk and national pop". ESC Beat's Doron Lahav ranked it 34th overall, stating that while he "appreciate[d] the authenticity of the song", he found the "structure quite messy". Scotsman writer Erin Adam rated the song five out of 10 points, stating that it "may prove too generic to be truly memorable"; however, they also admitted that they found the song to be "colourful, full of character and what Eurovision is all about".

== Eurovision Song Contest 2024 ==
=== Internal selection ===
The Armenian entry for the Eurovision Song Contest 2024 was internally selected by AMPTV. In January 2024, the duo was reported as the selected act by local and international media. On 9 March 2024, the broadcaster officially confirmed the duo as the Armenian entrant for the 2024 contest, with the entry, "Jako", revealed on 13 March.

=== At Eurovision ===
The Eurovision Song Contest 2024 took place at the Malmö Arena in Malmö, Sweden, and consisted of two semi-finals held on the respective dates of 7 and 9 May and the final on 11 May 2024. During the allocation draw on 30 January 2024, Armenia was drawn to compete in the second semi-final, performing in the first half of the show. The duo were later drawn to perform eighth, ahead of Denmark's Saba and behind Latvia's Dons.

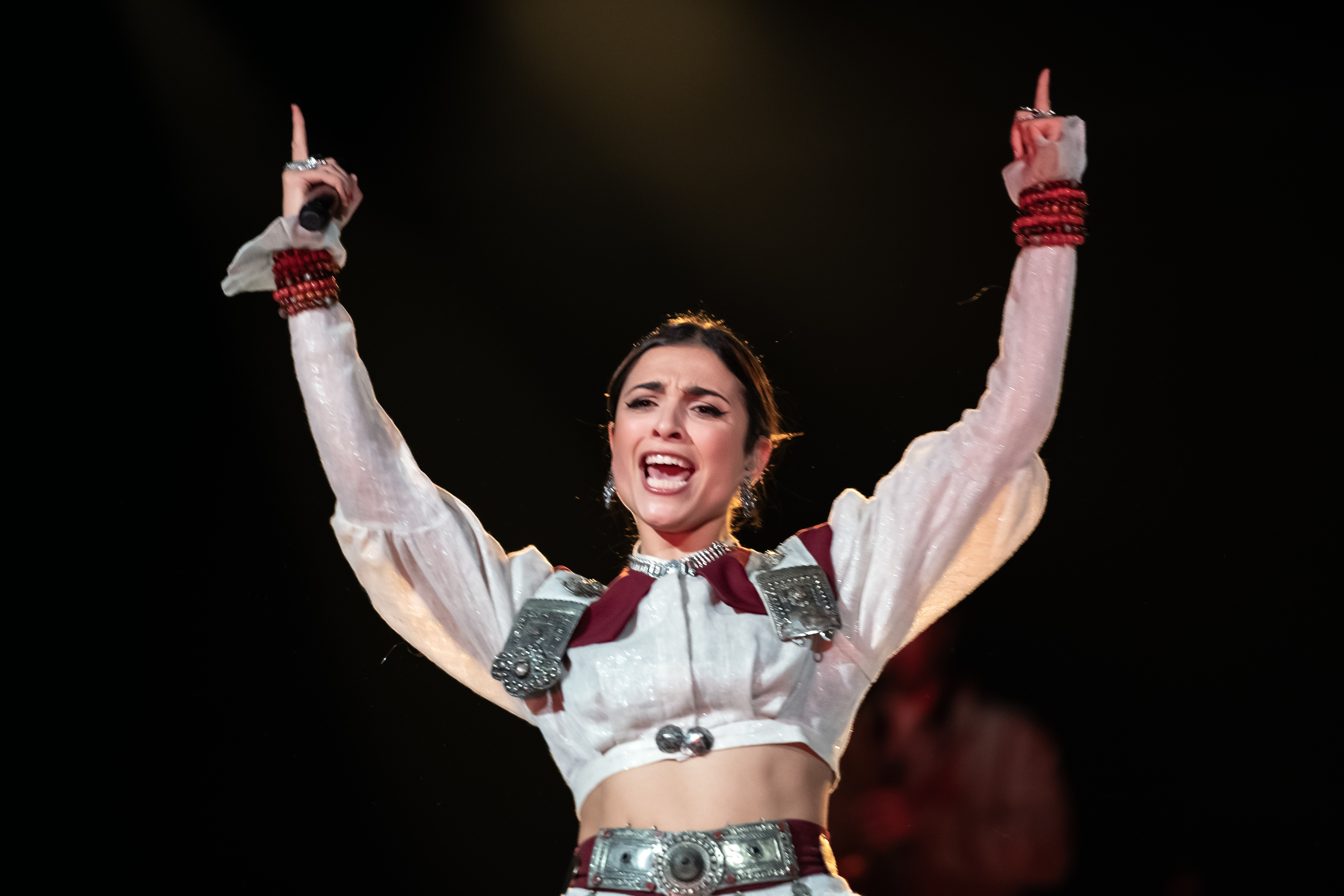
Ladaniva performing "Jako" in a dress rehearsal before the Eurovision 2024 second semi-final.

For its Eurovision performance, Artur Manukyan was appointed as the staging director. Before Eurovision, Armenian head of delegation David Tserunyan promised that the performance would be "something very positive and vocal, giving all the Armenian vibe and energy". The performance featured the duo along with four backing instrument players all wearing traditional Armenian clothing on a giant plinth. Facial expressions of the duo are emphasized within the performance, along with chickens and Armenians motifs. "Jako" finished in third, scoring 137 points and securing a position in the grand final.

The duo performed performed a repeat of their performance in the grand final on 11 May. The song was performed in 19th, ahead of Portugal's Iolanda and before Cyprus' Silia Kapsis. After the results were announced, they finished in eighth with 183 points, with a split score of 101 points from juries and 82 points from public televoting. The song received no sets of the maximum 12 points from either category. Regarding the former, the most a country awarded was eight, given by Albania, Portugal, and San Marino. In the televote, the most one gave was ten, awarded by France and Georgia.

== Charts ==
Chart performance for "Jako"
Chart (2024)	Peak position
Greece International (IFPI)	19
Lithuania (AGATA)	22
Netherlands (Single Tip)	6
Sweden Heatseeker (Sverigetopplistan)	12

== Release history ==
Release dates and formats for "Jako"
Region	Date	Format(s)	Version	Label	Type	Ref.
Various	29 September 2023	Digital download; streaming	Album track	Jiguli; PIAS Recordings	Single	
Various	13 March 2024	Digital download; streaming	Eurovision version	Jiguli; PIAS Recordings	Single	
