= Survivor (Parg song) =

2025 single by Parg

Single by Parg
- Released: 21 March 2025
- Genre: Pop-rock
- Length: 2:58
- Songwriters: Alex Wilke; Armen Paul; Benjamin Alasu; Eva Voskanian; Jon Aljidi; Joshua Curran; Martin Mooradian; Pargev Vardanian; Peter Boström; Thomas G:son
- Producers: Pargev Vardanian; Thomas G:son; Benjamin Alasu; Peter Boström; Yinon Yahel; Vvenice; Dav; Aleeka26

Parg singles chronology
"Qo Mot" (2024)	"Survivor" (2025)

Live video
- "Survivor" on YouTube

Music video
- "Survivor" (orchestral version) on YouTube

Eurovision Song Contest 2025 entry
- Country: Armenia
- Artist: Parg
- Languages: English, Armenian

Finals performance
- Semi-final result: 10th
- Semi-final points: 51
- Final result: 20th
- Final points: 72

Entry chronology
- ◄ "Jako" (2024)
- "Paloma Rumba" (2026) ►

Official performance video
- "Survivor" (second semi-final) on YouTube "Survivor" (grand final) on YouTube

"Survivor" is a song by Armenian singer and songwriter Parg. Written by himself alongside nine other songwriters, it was released on 9 February 2025. The final version was officially released on streaming services on 21 March and represented Armenia in the Eurovision Song Contest 2025. The song details determination, moments on the verge of giving up, and frustration, and it placed 20th in the contest with 72 points. It received mixed reviews from critics. Some highlighted its "timeless quality" and confident tone, while others likened it to Imagine Dragons.

== Background and composition ==
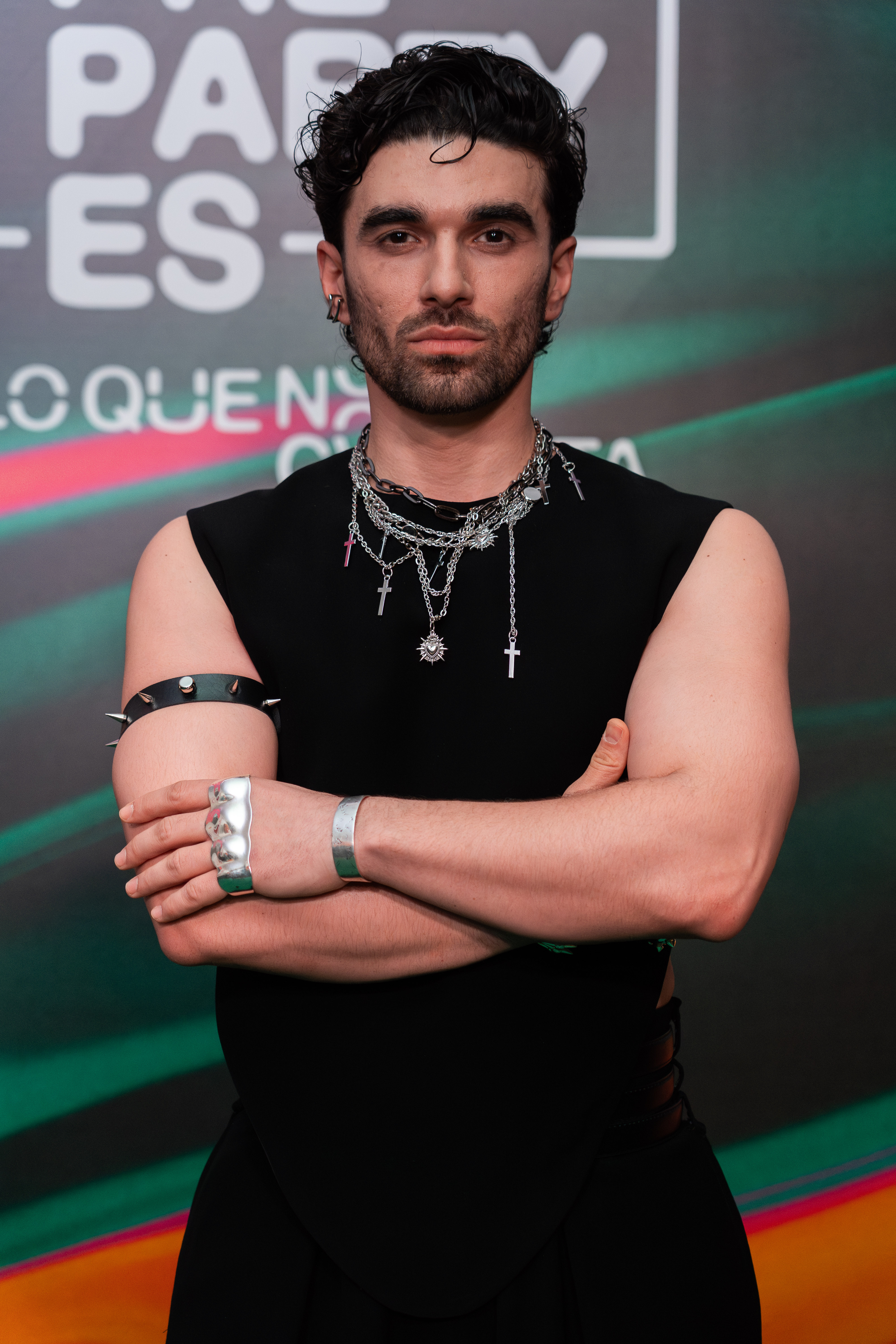
Parg at the Eurovision Song Contest PreParty

"Survivor" was written by Pargev Vardanian (Parg), Alex Wilke, Armen Paul, Benjamin Alasu, Eva Voskanian, Jon Aljidi, Joshua Curran, Martin Mooradian, Peter Boström, and Thomas G:son. The inspiration for the song stemmed from bullying issues from his childhood while likening it to a continuation of a previous track of his titled "Araj". Parg said that criticism on his artistry remained in him in some extent and was a major contribution for creating "Survivor". Numerous writers helped write the song, some contributing to songs which won Eurovision, including: "The Code", "Euphoria", and "Tattoo".

Reminiscent of Imagine Dragons, "Survivor" exhibits moments "when you feel like on the verge of giving up" yet "determined" to not give up according to Ruxandra Tudor of Wiwibloggs. At the beginning of the song, he acknowledges that struggles are "real and valid" and portrays his frustration as genuine. Yet, he does not allow himself to give up because "being alive means experiencing both ups and downs." The song eventually ends showing life as an "exercise in perseverance", with Tudor adding that "no matter how strong the pain, Parg's strength is even stronger". Musically, it is a fusion of rock and electronic elements. After winning Depi Evratesil, a revamped version of the song was released, with production changes in melody and instrumentation.

== Promotion ==
Parg was the 29th artist who was announced to be participating in Eurovision in Concert 2025, which took place on 5 April in Amsterdam, Netherlands. He also performed "Survivor" in PrePartyES 2025 in Madrid, Spain, on 17 to 19 April. He was described by Iván Trejo and José Miguel Mancheño of ESCPlus as "one of the stars of the show" in the concert.

== Critical reception ==
Professional ratings
Review scores
Source	Rating
Wiwibloggs	4.43/10
Yle	2/10
The Times	2/5 stars

Eva Frantz of Yle rated the song 2 out of 10, stating that Parg's survival story feels like Måns Zelmerlöw's "Revolution", asking "what exactly" Parg survived and opined that the song could have worked better in Armenian. The team of Wiwibloggs rated "Survivor" 4.43 out of 10, averaged between 17 reviewers. Some reviewers highlighted it as a "unique package" for any Eurovision edition, with its confident tone making it "stand out" from other entries. Another reviewer opined that the song had a "timeless quality", stating that the chorus was catchy from the first listen. On the other hand, reviewers said the song's "sheen wears out quickly" and that its lyrics could have been better. Out of the 37 songs in Eurovision, the song was ranked 36th place by the team.

Mark Savage of BBC reported that the song was inspired by Imagine Dragons and, while Parg gives it his all in the song, it still could not stand the semi-finals. Jon O'Brien of Vulture ranked "Survivor" 34th out of 37 songs in Eurovision 2025, opining that the song's similarity to Imagine Dragons, with their "chest-beating, chest-exposing oeuvre", still would not make it surpass Brunette's 14th place in the song contest. Rob Picheta of CNN ranked the song last out of 26 participants in the grand final, stating that the song is mildly uncool is "Imagine Dragons are your idea of edgy rock". Picheta added that his performance, most of it spent topless on a treadmill, was dramatic and had a vaguely "AI aesthetic". Picheta concluded the review stating that the song was terrible. Ed Potton of The Times ranked "Survivor" 24th out of 26 finalists, stating that Parg "belted out the pop-rock anthem" in a set-up like Kanye West's performance Glastonbury Festival 2015, adding that "neither of those things were good".

Armenia was given a 56 percent chance of qualifying in its semi-final, ranking 10th out of 16 participants in the semi-final in terms of qualifying. Following its qualification, the song was placed last in the odds for winning, with an estimated 0.3 percent chance, a two percent chance of finishing in the top five, getting ranked 24th, and an eight percent chance of placing in the top 10, placing last in the odds. It was also estimated to have a 5% likelihood of finishing last, being 6th on the odds.

== Eurovision Song Contest 2025 ==
=== Depi Evratesil 2025 ===
Depi Evratesil 2025 was the fourth edition of Depi Evratesil, the national final organised by AMPTV in order to select its entry for the Eurovision Song Contest. The competition took place on 16 February 2025 at the Karen Demirchyan Sports and Concerts Complex in Yerevan. The show was broadcast on Armenia 1, as well as online via the broadcaster's website 1tv.am and internationally via the Eurovision Song Contest's official YouTube channel. The final took place on 16 February 2025 and the winner was selected a combination of votes from an international jury, a national jury and a televote. Parg was one of twelve finalists selected by a jury following an audition round and revealed on 6 February 2025, while his song "Survivor", originally to be unveiled on the day of the final, was released on 9 February 2025. The song received the second-highest number of points from national and international juries and first place in the televote, ultimately winning the competition and earning the right to represent Armenia in the Eurovision Song Contest 2025 in Basel.

=== At Eurovision ===
The Eurovision Song Contest 2025 took place at St. Jakobshalle in Basel, Switzerland, and consisted of two semi-finals held on the respective dates of 13 and 15 May and the final on 17 May 2025. During the allocation draw held on 28 January 2025, Armenia was drawn to compete in the second semi-final, performing in the first half of the show. The staging and choreography was directed by Eirini Damianidou, who had directed Parg's performance in Depi Evratesil as well.

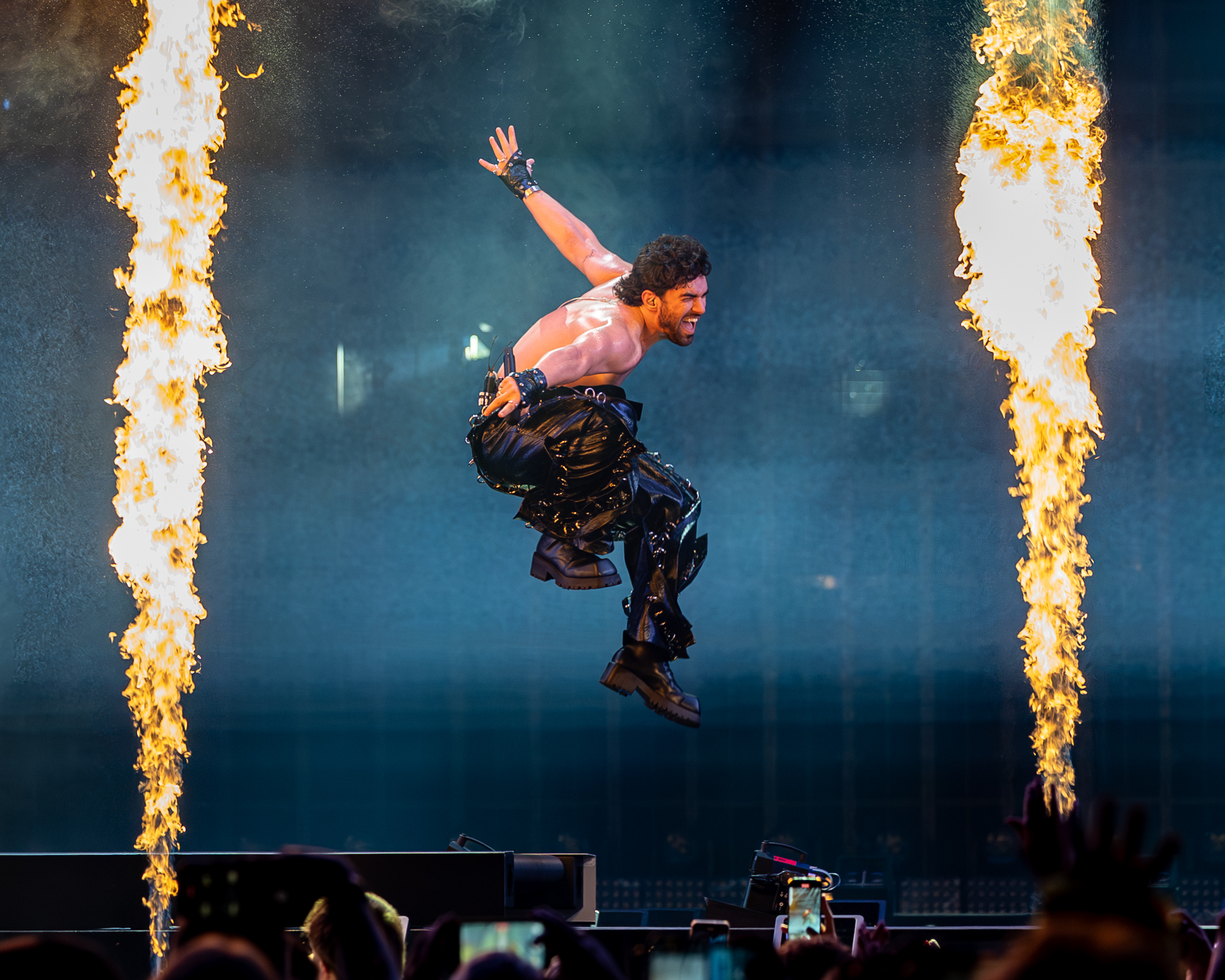
Parg performing in the Eurovision Song Contest

According to Nitsan Eliraz of EuroMix, a completely new stage concept was used for the performance in the national final. Instead of wearing the armor costume with an exposed shoulder in the national final, Parg wore a black tank top with black leather-style cargo pants. Half of the background LEGO lights were lowered to head height, while the other half hung at approximately 2.5 metres (8.2 feet). Eliraz said that the lights flashed and sparkled along with the bass. Parg's performance begins with him in a gap between the two light rays, illuminated by spotlights. A treadmill stands in the center stage, where Parg runs during the chorus. Before the middle section, after the chorus, large flame jets are positioned, reserved for the grand finale. Camera shots appear in front and behind of him, before the second chorus. The slower middle part begins and ends, with warm red and orange colors, then the lego lights rise when the final chorus starts. Armenia qualified for the grand final, gaining 10th place with 52 points.

Alexandra Koster of Special Broadcasting Service (SBS) said that Parg wearing leather pants to run in was "impractical", but "deliciously hardcore". Koster said that the "ballad bridge" shows the diversity of Parg, concluding the performance review with: "He can do anything! He's a survivor!" Carlos Marcos of El País described, in Spanish, that the performance "may suggest a shower of questions" but must be limited to one, the question being "was it necessary?". Neil McCormick of The Daily Telegraph described the song as owing to "pop-rock behemoth Imagine Dragons", adding that Parg "forgetting to put his shirt on" was an attempt to "distract" from the similarities with Imagine Dragons. McCormick concluded the review with: "If his career survives this, it will be an achievement in itself." Blanca Schofield of The Times said that Parg, during the performance, had "militaristic energy" as he ran on a "massive" treadmill.

At the grand final on 17 May, Armenia performed 18th, before Switzerland's Zoë Më and after Greece's Klavdia; Parg performed a repeat of his performance. After the results were announced, Parg received 20th place with 72 points: 30 from the jury and 42 from the audience. The country ranked highest in jury votes was first, receiving 12 points from France. In televotes, Armenia ranked first in Estonia's televotes, gaining 12 points.

== Personnel ==
Credits are adapted from Apple Music.

- Parg – Vocals, background vocals, songwriter, producer
- Bastián Boström – background vocals
- Vvenice – electric guitar, producer
- Erik Uusijärvi – cello
- Christopher Öhman – cello
- Vidar Andersson Melink – viola
- Fredrik Syberg – violin
- Lola Torrente – violin
- Paul Waltmen – violin
- Mattias Johansson – violin
- Erik Arvinder – strings engineer
- David Bukovinszky – cello
- Kristina Winiarski – cello
- Mikael Sjögren – viola
- Danial Sharlati – violin
- Jonna Simonsson – violin
- Patrik Swedrup – violin
- Ylva Larsdotter – violin
- Benji Alasu – programming, drums, bass guitar, songwriter, producer
- Milo Boström – background vocals
- Blárd Ericson – double bass
- Filip Lundberg – cello
- Erik Holm – viola
- Carl Vallin – violin
- Jannika Gustafsson – violin
- Oscar Treitler – violin
- Vicky Sayles – violin
- Vidar Rydén – background vocals
- Thomas G:son – songwriter, producer
- Peter Boström – songwriter, arranger, mixing engineer, vocal producer, producer
- Armen Paul – songwriter, producer
- Martin Mooradian – songwriter, associate producer
- Joshua Curran – songwriter
- Eva Voskanyan – songwriter
- Alex Wilke – songwriter, producer
- Yinon Yahel – producer
- aleeka_26 – producer
- Willem Bleeker – strings engineer
- Lars Norgren – mastering engineer

== Charts ==
Chart (2025)	Peak position
Lithuania (AGATA)	60
UK Singles Downloads (Official Charts)	64
UK Singles Sales (OCC)	67
