= Hyllievång =

Neighbourhood of Malmö, Sweden

- Neighbourhood
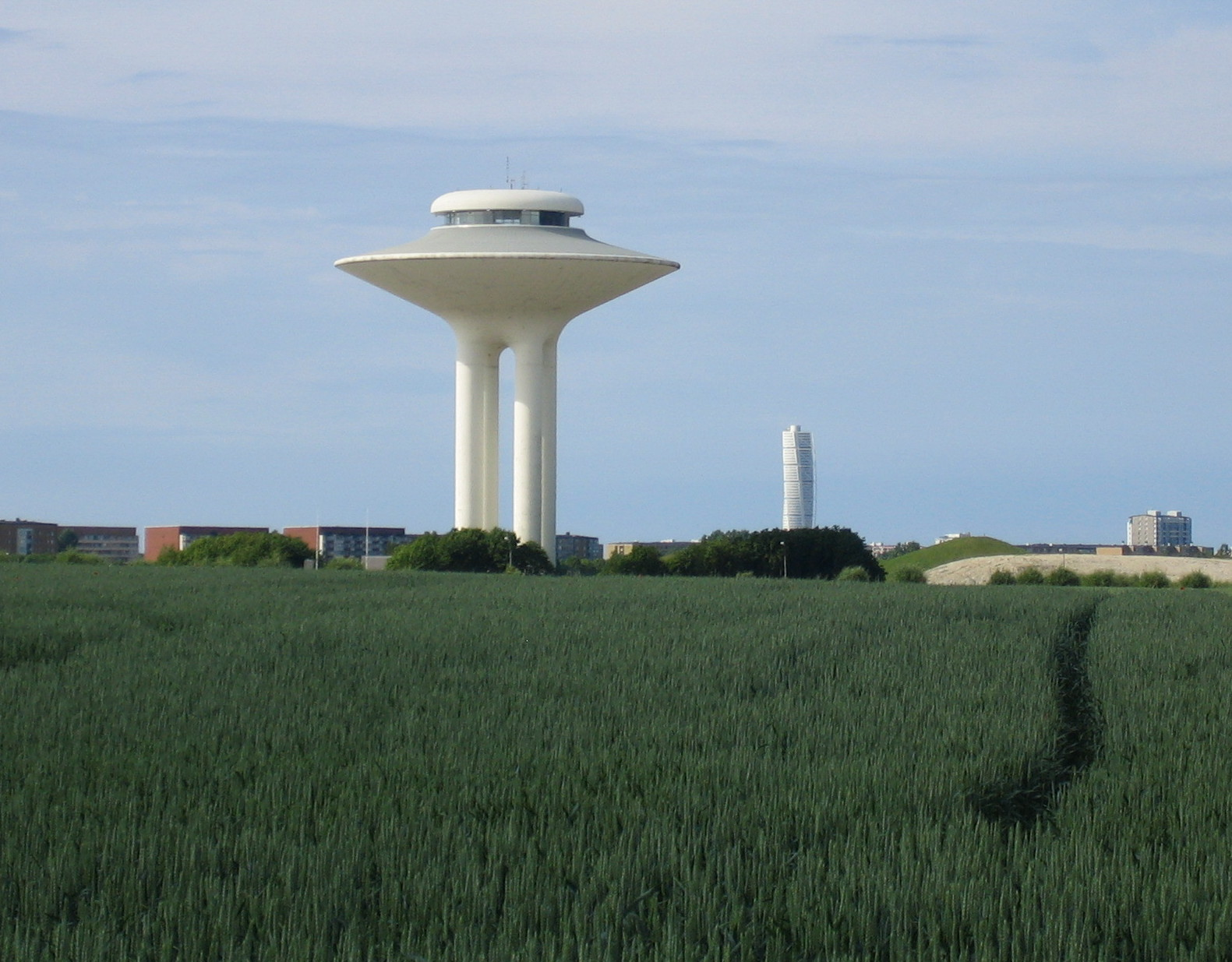
- Hyllie Water Tower
- Interactive map of Hyllievång
- Coordinates: 55°33′40″N 12°58′34″E
- Country: Sweden
- Province: Skåne
- County: Skåne County
- Municipality: Malmö Municipality
- Borough of Malmö: Hyllie

Population (2021)
  - Total: 6,650
- Time zone: UTC+1 (CET)
  - Summer (DST): UTC+2 (CEST)

Hyllievång is a neighbourhood of Malmö in Sweden, situated in Väster, Malmö Municipality.

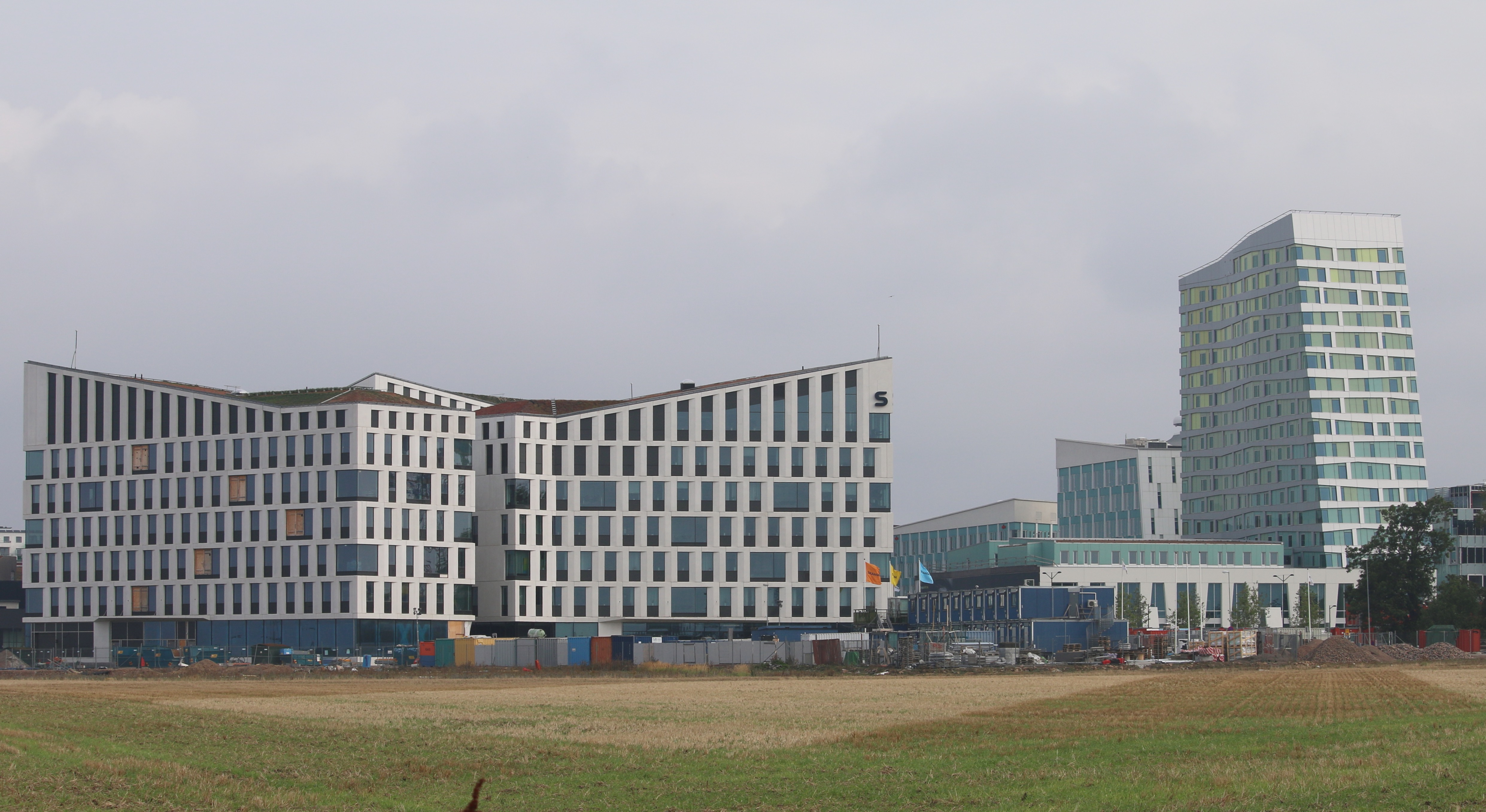
Modern architecture in Hyllievång
