= Isa Melikov =

Azerbaijani composer (born 1980)

Isa Melikov Məlikov İsa Fazil oğlu
- Born: October 21, 1980
- Origin: Baku, Azerbaijan
- Genres: Pop Music
- Occupation(s): Composer, producer
- Years active: since 1999
- Website: www.isamelikov.com

Isa Melikov (Azerbaijani: Məlikov İsa Fazil oğlu, born 21 October 1980, in Baku, Azerbaijan SSR) is a famous Azerbaijani composer and producer. He is the author of numerous musical projects, hit songs and soundtracks to movies. The list of celebrities singing his songs include leading stars of Azerbaijan as well as vocalists from CIS and Europe such as Dima Bilan, Eldar Gasimov, Nikki Jamal, Glenys Vargas, Kevin Etienne, Elli, Aysel, Gunesh, Zulfiyya Khanbabayeva, Aygün Kazımova, Elnara, Röya, Elşad Xose, Sevda Alekperzade, Manana, Faig Aghayev, Tunzala Agayeva, Zamig Huseynov, Malik Kalantarli, etc.

== Biography ==
He was born in 1980, October 21 in Baku. The parents of the future composer taught him love for music from a very early years of his life. Even as a child Isa knew by heart the lyrics of many international hits and by the age of 6 he already was trying to perform them on the piano. In 1987, he went to the secondary school #189 in Baku. In 1990 he became a student of the Baku musical school #1 named after Vagif Mustafazade.

In 1995 he entered the Musical College named after Asaf Zeynalli. Afterwards, in 1997 he entered the Azerbaijan State University of Culture and Arts, and graduated with honors in the specialty in 2001: the conductor of the orchestra of folk musical instruments. In 2003, he got a Master of Arts degree.

Starting from 2002, he introduced a new music genre R & B to Azerbaijani market, he started working on it. In 2003, for the first time in Azerbaijan, he wrote a song in R & B style named "Qəm Otağı" for the singer Elnara, and by this aimed to popularize the genre of R & B in Azerbaijan.

In 2004 he became a member of the British Academy of Composers and songwriters.

In 2005, for the first time he synthesized Azerbaijani folklore (mugham) music with R & B style in song "Uçduq", performed by singer Zamig.

Since 2006 he became a dissertator at Baku Music Academy named after Uzeyir Hajibeyov.

In 2006 he became a musical producer of the largest Azerbaijani television project in a reality show format called "Academy".

In 2008, he participated in Berlinale Talent Campus holding in the frame of 58th Berlin Film Festival, where he met and received a master class from two time "Oscar" winner composer Gustavo Santaolalla.

In 2008, he established the production center "Baku Music Factory", and became its general producer.

The first project of BMF production center wins third place at Eurovision Song Contest 2009 with the participation of the singer Aysel, under the management of Isa Melikov.

In 2009, he created Azerbaijan's first official digital publishing and record label "BMF Records".

In 2011, BMF Records project wins Eurovision Song Contest 2011 with the participation of Nigar Jamal featuring Eldar Gasimov took with «Running Scared» song.

== Activities after Eurovision 2011 ==
On January 14, 2012 the Danish national broadcaster DR has announced the team of the international jury of "Dansk Melodi Grand Prix 2012", where Isa Melikov also took part in line with Oceana, Ell & Nikki, Alexander Rybak and Alexey Vorobyov.

He created Azerbaijan's first online music brand BMF, similar to American VEVO, and Russian ELLO, becoming an official partner of YouTube and the first Azerbaijani official YouTube channel in the field of music and entertainment. The channel presents BMF's works and related projects.

He is the author of music for the song "Heartbreaker" by singer Eldar Gasimov, and the song "Обними меня" by Dima Bilan and Nigar Jamal.

Melikov wrote "Skeletons" by Dihaj along with Sandra Bjurman. The song represented Azerbaijan in the Eurovision Song Contest 2017 in Kyiv, Ukraine.

In 2016 in cooperation with Dastan Orasbekov (producer from Kazakhstan) Isa presented an international project - girls band called Turkiss. Their first single was called "Çağır məni" in Azerbaijani and «Шақыр мені» (song written by Isa Melikov) in Kazakh, publicization of which is being actively promoted both in Kazakhstan and Azerbaijan.

== Activities in cinematography ==
In 2008, he debuted in filmography by composing music for movie "Dolls", which world premiere took place in July 2010 in the frame of Film Festival in Karlovy Vary.

== Personal life ==
In 2007 Isa Melikov wed with Bakuvian Polish origin Pauline Volodkovskaya. The couple have a daughter, named Melisa (born 14 November 2013 in Miami).
