= Eurovision Song Contest 2017 =

International song competition

- Celebrate Diversity

Dates and venue
- Semi-final 1: 9 May 2017
- Semi-final 2: 11 May 2017
- Final: 13 May 2017
- Venue: International Exhibition Centre; Kyiv, Ukraine

Organisation
- Organiser: European Broadcasting Union (EBU)
- Executive supervisor: Jon Ola Sand

Production
- Host broadcaster: Public Broadcasting Company of Ukraine (UA:PBC)
- Directors: Troels Lund; Alexander Kolb; Ladislaus Kiraly
- Executive producer: Pavlo Grytsak
- Presenters: Oleksandr Skichko; Volodymyr Ostapchuk; Timur Miroshnychenko

Participants
- Number of entries: 42
- Number of finalists: 26
- Returning countries: Portugal; Romania
- Non-returning countries: Bosnia and Herzegovina; Russia
- Participation map: Finalist countries Countries eliminated in the semi-finals Countries that participated in the past but not in 2017

Vote
- Voting system: Each country awards two sets of 12, 10, 8–1 points to ten songs.
- Winning song: Portugal "Amar pelos dois"

The Eurovision Song Contest 2017 was the 62nd edition of the Eurovision Song Contest. It consisted of two semi-finals on 9 and 11 May and a final on 13 May 2017, held at the International Exhibition Centre in Kyiv, Ukraine, and presented by Oleksandr Skichko, Volodymyr Ostapchuk, and Timur Miroshnychenko. It was organised by the European Broadcasting Union (EBU) and host broadcaster the Public Broadcasting Company of Ukraine (UA:PBC), which staged the event after its legal predecessor, the National Television Company of Ukraine (NTU), had won the 2016 contest for Ukraine with the song "1944" by Jamala. It was the first contest since the inaugural 1956 edition without a female host.

Broadcasters from forty-two countries participated in the contest. Portugal and Romania returned to the contest after a year's absence, while Bosnia and Herzegovina did not participate on financial grounds. Russia had originally planned to participate, but later withdrew after its representative, Julia Samoylova, was banned from entering Ukraine by virtue of having travelled directly from Russia to Crimea, a region that was annexed by Russia in 2014, to give a performance, which is illegal under Ukrainian law.

The winner was Portugal with the song "Amar pelos dois", performed by Salvador Sobral and written by his sister Luísa Sobral. The song won both the jury vote and televote, and Bulgaria, Moldova, Belgium, and Sweden rounded out the top five. This was Portugal's first victory in 53 years of participation, the longest wait for victory by any participating country in Eurovision history. It was also the first winning song entirely performed in a country's native language since "Molitva" for Serbia in 2007. The top three countries – Portugal, Bulgaria and Moldova – all achieved their highest placings in their Eurovision history to that date, while host country Ukraine received its worst placing to date, finishing 24th in the final.

The EBU reported that 182 million viewers watched the contest, 22 million fewer than the 2016 record.

== Location ==
International Exhibition Centre, Kyiv - host venue of the 2017 contest

=== Venue ===
The contest took place in the International Exhibition Centre in Kyiv, following Ukraine's victory at the 2016 contest with the song "1944", written and performed by Jamala. The International Exhibition Centre has a capacity of approximately 11,000 attendees and is the largest exhibition centre in Kyiv. Located in the western part of the Livoberezhna microdistrict, the centre was opened in October 2002, and its head since its construction was Anatoly Tkachenko.

=== Bidding phase ===
Locations of the candidate cities: the chosen host city is marked in blue. The shortlisted cities are marked in green, while the eliminated cities are marked in red.

After Ukraine's win in 2016, Viktoriia Romanova, Deputy Chief of host broadcaster Public Broadcasting Company of Ukraine (UA:PBC), announced that the first organisational meeting for the contest would take place before 8 June, and that the venue for the contest would be announced over the summer. UA:PBC and the Ukrainian government formally launched the bidding process for interested cities to apply to host the contest on 23 June, although on 30 June, Culture Minister Yevhen Nyshchuk stated that an appropriate venue for the contest does not exist in Ukraine, suggesting that the construction of a new venue in Kyiv or Lviv should be considered. Dnipro, Kharkiv, Kherson, Kyiv, Lviv and Odesa submitted bids by 8 July, while Cherkasy, Irpin, Uzhhorod and Vinnytsia had previously declared their interest in hosting the contest but did not put forward formal applications.

On 20 July, a two-hour live discussion show titled "City Battle", moderated by Timur Miroshnychenko, saw representatives from each candidate city presenting their bids in front of a live studio audience, which included the organisational committee. UA:PBC announced on 22 July that the bids from Dnipro, Kyiv and Odesa had been shortlisted for further consideration. The final announcement was delayed multiple times, with Kyiv announced as the host city on 9 September.

Key † Host venue ‡ Shortlisted

City	Venue	Notes
Dnipro	DniproEuroArena ‡	Proposal included the complete reconstruction of the Meteor Stadium and Sports Complex Meteor, which would have been completed by March 2017. Withdrew after the host city announcement was postponed for the fourth time.
Kharkiv	Metalist Oblast Sports Complex	Hosted three group stage matches of UEFA Euro 2012. Would have required significant construction, including the addition of a roof.
Kherson	"Yuvileinyi" Concert Hall	Proposal included expansion and reconstruction of the venue, which would have taken approximately 7–8 months.
Kyiv
Kyiv	Palace of Sports ‡	Hosted the Eurovision Song Contest 2005 and the Junior Eurovision Song Contest 2009. May have conflicted with contest preparations as the venue hosted part of the 2017 IIHF World Championship Division I ice hockey tournament between 22 and 28 April 2017.
Kyiv	International Exhibition Centre †	Venue was initially submitted as a reserve. Kyiv later announced on 24 August 2016 that this was their preferred venue for staging the contest.
Lviv	Arena Lviv	Hosted three of the group-stage games for UEFA Euro 2012. The arena required the construction of a roof.
Lviv	Unfinished venue	An unfinished venue originally planned for EuroBasket 2015 that was 25% complete when construction halted.
Odesa	Chornomorets Stadium ‡	Proposal included plans for reconstruction of the venue and options for providing a covered roof.

=== Other sites ===
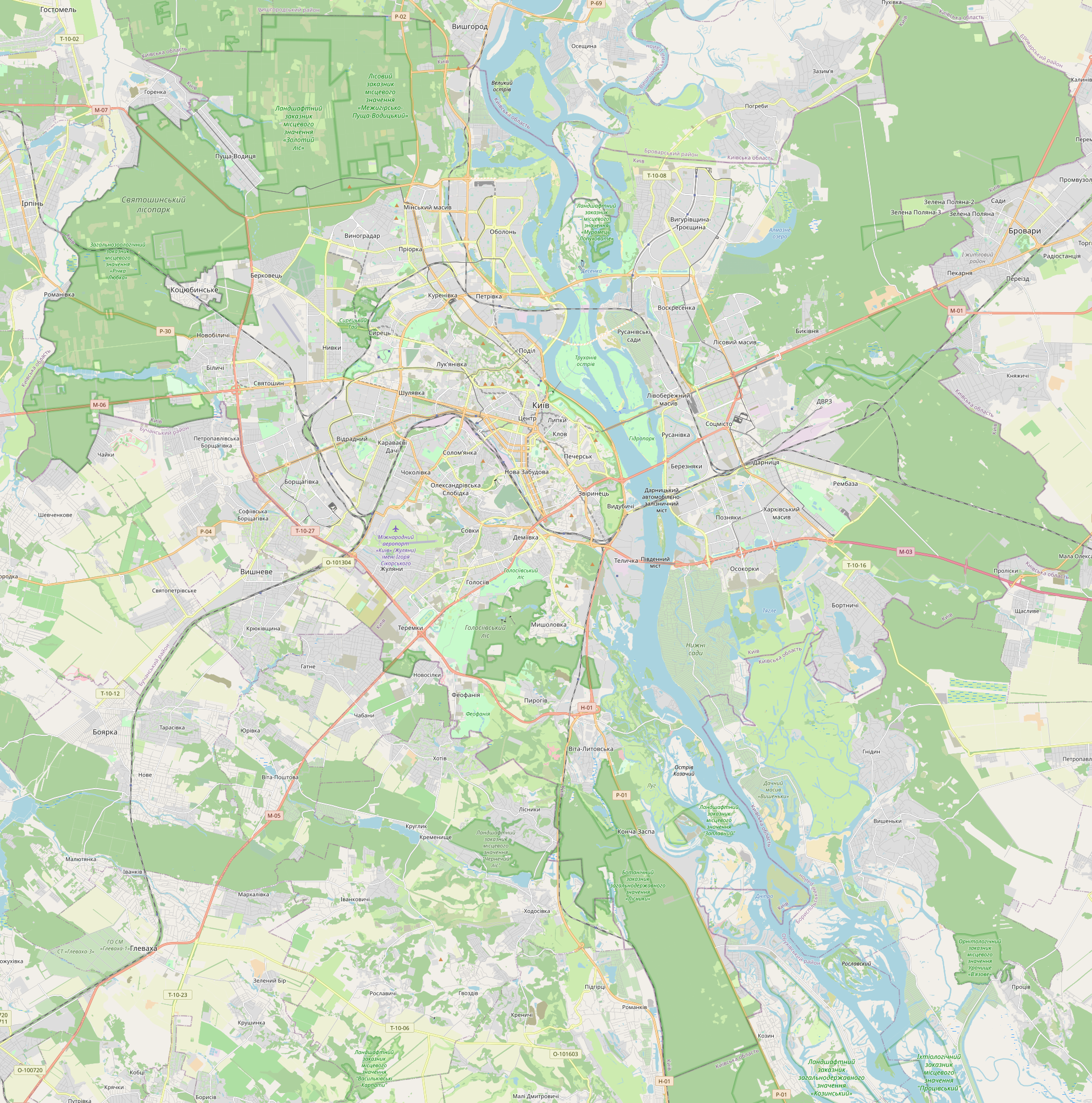
Location of host venue (red) and other contest-related sites and events (blue)

The Eurovision Village was the official Eurovision Song Contest fan and sponsors' area during the events week. There it was possible to watch performances by local artists, as well as the live shows broadcast from the main venue. Located at Independence Square in Kyiv, it was open from 4 to 14 May 2017.

The EuroClub was the venue for the official after-parties and private performances by contest participants. Unlike the Eurovision Village, access to the EuroClub was restricted to accredited fans, delegates, and press. It was located at the Parkovy Congress and Exhibition Center.

The "Red Carpet" event, where the contestants and their delegations are presented before the accredited press and fans, took place at Mariinskyi Palace in central Kyiv on 7 May 2017 at 19:00 CEST, followed by the Opening Ceremony at the Parkovy Congress and Exhibition Center.

== Participants ==
Eurovision Song Contest 2017 – Participation summaries by country
- Albania; Armenia; Australia; Austria; Azerbaijan; Belarus; Belgium; Bulgaria; Croatia; Cyprus; Czech Republic; Denmark; Estonia; Finland; France; Georgia; Germany; Greece; Hungary; Iceland; Ireland; Israel; Italy; Latvia; Lithuania; Macedonia; Malta; Moldova; Montenegro; Netherlands; Norway; Poland; Portugal; Romania; ~~Russia~~; San Marino; Serbia; Slovenia; Spain; Sweden; Switzerland; Ukraine; United Kingdom

Eligibility for potential participation in the Eurovision Song Contest requires a national broadcaster with active EBU membership capable of receiving the contest via the Eurovision network and broadcasting it live nationwide. The EBU issued an invitation to participate in the contest to all active members and associate member Australia.

Initially, on 31 October 2016, it was announced that forty-three countries were to participate in the contest, equalling the record set in 2008 and 2011. Portugal and Romania returned after a year's absence, while Bosnia and Herzegovina withdrew on financial grounds. Russia had planned to participate but announced their withdrawal on 13 April 2017, after their representative, Julia Samoylova, was banned from entering Ukraine by virtue of travelling directly from Russia to Crimea, a region that was annexed by Russia in 2014, to give a performance, which is illegal under Ukrainian law. This subsequently reduced the number of participating countries to forty-two, the same number of countries as 2016.

The contest featured five representatives who also previously performed as lead vocalists for the same countries. Valentina Monetta, who performed in a duet this time, represented San Marino in 2012, 2013, and 2014. The duo of Koit Toome and Laura Põldvere have both represented Estonia in different years: Toome in 1998 as a solo artist, finishing 12th place with the song "Mere lapsed", and Põldvere in 2005 as part of Suntribe, finishing 20th in the semi-final with the song "Let's Get Loud". Omar Naber represented Slovenia in 2005, finishing 12th in the semi-final with the song "Stop". This also made for one of the only occasions in which the same participants not only returned after originally competing in the same year, but also had both participations occur in the same host country (the only other recent example being 1982, which saw both Norway's Anita Skorgan and Belgium's Stella Maessen return to the United Kingdom for the second time after the 1977 contest). SunStroke Project represented Moldova in 2010 alongside Olia Tira, finishing 22nd with the song "Run Away".

The contest also featured the group Og3ne which previously represented the Netherlands in 2007 at the Junior Eurovision Song Contest, as Lisa, Amy and Shelley, with the song "Adem in, adem uit". In addition, the contest featured two lead singers previously participating as backing vocalists for the same countries: Israel's representative Imri Ziv who backed Nadav Guedj in 2015 and Hovi Star in 2016, and Serbia's representative Tijana Bogićević who backed Nina in 2011.

Eurovision Song Contest 2017 participants
Country	Broadcaster	Artist	Song	Language	Songwriter(s)
Albania	RTSH	Lindita	"World"	English	Big Basta; Lindita; Klodian Qafoku
Armenia	AMPTV	Artsvik	"Fly with Me"	English	Avet Barseghyan; Levon Navasardyan; Lilith Navasaryan; David Tserunyan
Australia	SBS	Isaiah	"Don't Come Easy"	English	Michael Angelo; Anthony Egizii; David Musumeci
Austria	ORF	Nathan Trent	"Running on Air"	English	Bernhard Penzias; Nathan Trent
Azerbaijan	İTV	Dihaj	"Skeletons"	English	Sandra Bjurman; Isa Melikov
Belarus	BTRC	Naviband	"Story of My Life"	Belarusian	Arciom Lukjanienka
Belgium	RTBF	Blanche	"City Lights"	English	Emmanuel Delcourt; Ellie Delvaux; Pierre Dumoulin
Bulgaria	BNT	Kristian Kostov	"Beautiful Mess"	English	Johan Alkenäs; Sebastian Arman; Alexander V. Blay; Borislav Milanov; Joacim Persson
Croatia	HRT	Jacques Houdek	"My Friend"	English, Italian	Jacques Houdek; Arjana Kunštek; Fabrizio Laucella; Tony Malm; Ines Prajo; Siniša Reljić
Cyprus	CyBC	Hovig	"Gravity"	English	Thomas G:son
Czech Republic	ČT	Martina Bárta	"My Turn"	English	DWB; Kyler Niko
Denmark	DR	Anja	"Where I Am"	English	Michael D'Arcy; Anja Nissen; Angel Tupai
Estonia	ERR	Koit Toome and Laura	"Verona"	English	Sven Lõhmus
Finland	Yle	Norma John	"Blackbird"	English	Lasse Piirainen; Leena Tirronen
France	France Télévisions	Alma	"Requiem"	French, English	Nazim Khaled; Alexandra Maquet
Georgia	GPB	Tamara Gachechiladze	"Keep the Faith"	English	Tamara Gachechiladze; Anri Jokhadze
Germany	NDR (Note: On behalf of the German public broadcasting consortium ARD)	Levina	"Perfect Life"	English	Dave Bassett; Lindsey Ray; Lindy Robbins
Greece	ERT	Demy	"This Is Love"	English	John Ballard; Dimitris Kontopoulos; Romy Papadea
Hungary	MTVA	Joci Pápai	"Origo"	Hungarian	József Pápai
Iceland	RÚV	Svala	"Paper"	English	Einar Egilsson; Lily Elise; Lester Mendez; Svala Björgvinsdóttir
Ireland	RTÉ	Brendan Murray	"Dying to Try"	English	Jörgen Elofsson; James Newman
Israel	IBA	Imri	"I Feel Alive"	English	Penn Hazut; Dolev Ram
Italy	RAI	Francesco Gabbani	"Occidentali's Karma"	Italian	Luca Chiaravalli; Filippo Gabbani; Francesco Gabbani; Fabio Ilacqua
Latvia	LTV	Triana Park	"Line"	English	Kristaps Ērglis; Agnese Rakovska; Kristians Rakovskis
Lithuania	LRT	Fusedmarc	"Rain of Revolution"	English	Viktorija Ivanovskaja; Michail Levin; Denis Zujev
Macedonia	MRT	Jana Burčeska	"Dance Alone"	English	Florence A.; Johan Alkenäs; Borislav Milanov; Joacim Persson
Malta	PBS	Claudia Faniello	"Breathlessly"	English	Gerard James Borg; Philip Vella; Sean Vella
Moldova	TRM	SunStroke Project	"Hey Mamma"	English	Mihail Cebotarenco; Alina Galetskaya; Anton Ragoza; Sergey Stepanov; Sergei Yalovitsky
Montenegro	RTCG	Slavko Kalezić	"Space"	English	Iva Boršić; Adis Eminić; Momčilo Zeković "Zeko"
Netherlands	AVROTROS	Og3ne	"Lights and Shadows"	English	Rory de Kievit; Rick Vol
Norway	NRK	Jowst (Note: Performance contains uncredited live vocals from Aleksander Walmann)	"Grab the Moment"	English	Jonas McDonnell; Joakim With Steen
Poland	TVP	Kasia Moś	"Flashlight"	English	Pete Barringer; Rickard Bonde Truumeel; Kasia Moś
Portugal	RTP	Salvador Sobral	"Amar pelos dois"	Portuguese	Luísa Sobral
Romania	TVR	Ilinca feat. Alex Florea	"Yodel It!"	English	Mihai Alexandru; Alexa Niculae
San Marino	SMRTV	Valentina Monetta and Jimmie Wilson	"Spirit of the Night"	English	Steven Barnacle; Ralph Siegel; Jutta Staudenmayer
Serbia	RTS	Tijana Bogićević	"In Too Deep"	English	Johan Alkenäs; Lisa Desmond; Borislav Milanov; Joacim Persson
Slovenia	RTVSLO	Omar Naber	"On My Way"	English	Omar Naber; Žiga Pirnat
Spain	RTVE	Manel Navarro	"Do It for Your Lover"	Spanish, English	Manel Navarro; Antonio "Rayito" Rayo
Sweden	SVT	Robin Bengtsson	"I Can't Go On"	English	David Kreuger; Hamed "K-One" Pirouzpanah; Robin Stjernberg
Switzerland	SRG SSR	Timebelle	"Apollo"	English	Alessandra Günthardt; Nicolas Günthardt; Elias Näslin
Ukraine	UA:PBC	O.Torvald	"Time"	English	Zhenia Galych; Yevhen Kamenchuk; Denys Myzyuk
United Kingdom	BBC	Lucie Jones	"Never Give Up on You"	English	Emmelie de Forest; Lawrie Martin; Daniel Salcedo

=== Other countries ===
==== Active EBU members ====
- Russia – Russia had originally planned to participate in the contest with the song "Flame Is Burning", performed by Julia Samoylova. However, Channel One Russia withdrew from the contest on 13 April 2017, after Samoylova was issued a three-year travel ban by the Security Service of Ukraine (SBU) from entering Ukraine on 22 March, by virtue of illegally travelling directly from Russia to Crimea, a region that was annexed by Russia in 2014, in 2015 to give a performance.

Active EBU member broadcasters in Andorra, Luxembourg, Monaco and Slovakia confirmed non-participation prior to the announcement of the participants list by the EBU. BHRT, broadcaster for Bosnia and Herzegovina, did the same due to financial difficulties and non-payment of debts to the EBU totalling 6 million Swiss francs (€5.4 million); the EBU had already threatened to withdraw BHRT from all member services in May 2016, and in late 2016 they began to impose sanctions on the broadcaster for their pending debts. Despite initially stating their participation in the contest and efforts from non-governmental organizations aimed at their return in 2017, Turkish broadcaster TRT ultimately opted not to participate.

==== Associate EBU members ====
Kazakh broadcaster Khabar Agency became an associate member of the EBU on 1 January 2016, opening up the possibility of their participation in 2017; however, Kazakhstan was not on the final list of participating countries announced by the EBU on 31 October 2016.

==== Non-EBU members ====
In 2016, Kosovan broadcaster RTK was invited to the Eurovision Committee to discuss the possibility of being accepted in the EBU in order to take part in the contest; however, Kosovo did not appear on the final list of participants. Liechtensteiner broadcaster 1FLTV announced that they would not debut at the contest in 2017, but that they intended to obtain EBU membership in order to debut in a future contest, on receipt of financial support from the government.

== Format ==
The preliminary dates for the contest were announced on 14 March 2016 at a meeting of Heads of Delegation in Stockholm, with the semi-finals expected to take place on 16 and 18 May and the final on 20 May 2017. These preliminary dates were chosen by the EBU to avoid the contest coinciding with any major television and sporting events scheduled to take place around that time. However, the EBU announced on 24 June 2016 that the preliminary dates for the contest had to be brought forward a week, with the semi-finals scheduled for 9 and 11 May and the final on 13 May. This was due to a request from UA:PBC, as the initial preliminary dates coincided with the remembrance day for the victims of the deportation of the Crimean Tatars on 18 May. However, despite attempts to avoid conflicts, the eventual dates coincided with the second leg of the UEFA Champions League and UEFA Europa League semi-finals.

In December 2016, Pavlo Hrytsak was appointed as the new head of the organising committee. In February 2017, 21 team members resigned, claiming that Hrytsak's appointment effectively stopped work on the contest for two months.

=== Semi-final allocation draw ===
Results of the semi-final allocation draw Participating countries in the first semi-final Pre-qualified for the final but also voting in the first semi-final Participating countries in the second semi-final (Note: Russia, which had originally been allocated into semi-final 2, withdrew from the contest in April 2017.) Pre-qualified for the final but also voting in the second semi-final

The draw to determine the allocation of the participating countries into their respective semi-finals took place at Column Hall on 31 January 2017, hosted by Timur Miroshnychenko and Nika Konstantinova. The thirty-seven semi-finalists had been allocated into six pots, based on historical voting patterns as calculated by the contest's official televoting partner Digame. Drawing from different pots helps to reduce the chance of so-called "bloc voting" and increase suspense in the semi-finals.

Pot 1	Pot 2	Pot 3	Pot 4	Pot 5	Pot 6
Albania; Croatia; Macedonia; Montenegro; Serbia; Slovenia; Switzerland (Note: Switzerland, who had been allocated to pot one, were pre-allocated to compete in the second semi-final at the request of Swiss broadcaster SRF.)	Denmark; Estonia; Finland; Iceland; Norway; Sweden	Armenia; Azerbaijan; Belarus; Georgia; Israel; ~~Russia~~	Bulgaria; Cyprus; Greece; Hungary; Moldova; Romania	Australia; Austria; Czech Republic; Malta; Portugal; San Marino	Belgium; Ireland; Latvia; Lithuania; Netherlands; Poland

=== Visual design ===
The theme of the contest, "Celebrate Diversity", was unveiled on 30 January 2017, with its visual design featuring imagery of stylized beads. The main logo used the beads to form a traditional Ukrainian neck amulet.

=== Presenters ===
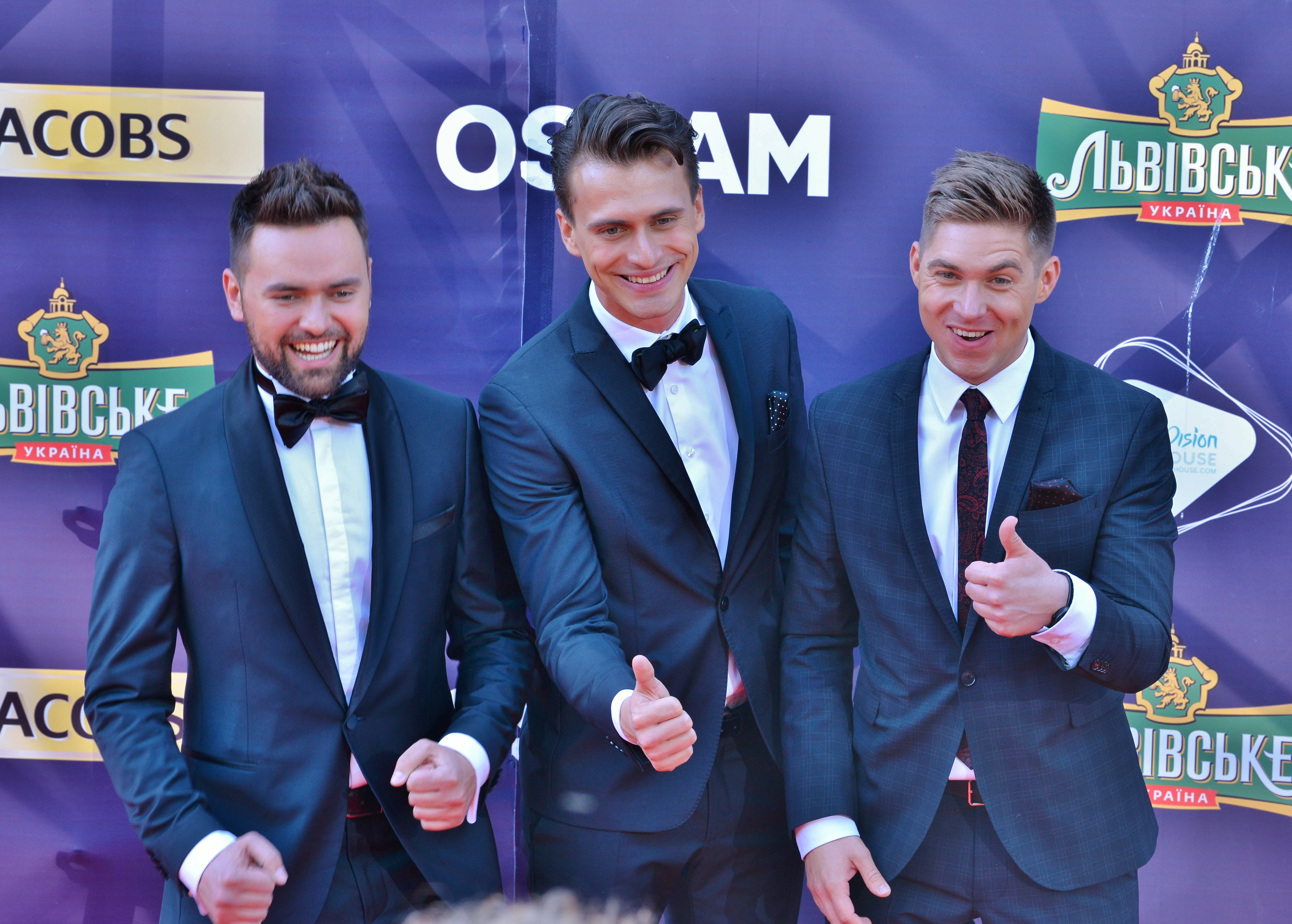
The hosts on the red carpet

The EBU announced on 27 February that the presenters for the contest would be Oleksandr Skichko, Volodymyr Ostapchuk and Timur Miroshnychenko, with Miroshnychenko also hosting the green room. It was the first time that the contest was presented by a male trio, and the second time that the contest did not feature a female presenter, after 1956. Miroshnychenko has previously co-hosted the Junior Eurovision Song Contest in 2009 and 2013.

=== Promotional emojis ===
It was announced on 30 April that the creative teams from both the Eurovision network and Twitter had worked together to create three emoji that would accompany specific promotional hashtags for the duration of the contest. The heart emoji would appear alongside #ESC2017 and #Eurovision, while the winners' trophy emoji would be used for #12Points and #douzepoints. The final emoji is the logo for the contest, which would appear alongside #CelebrateDiversity, the slogan of the contest.

=== Opening and interval acts ===
The EBU released details regarding the opening and interval acts for each of the live shows on 20 April. The first semi-final was opened by Monatik performing "Spinning", while the interval featured Jamala performing a new version of her winning song "1944" and "Zamanyly". The second semi-final was opened by a medley of past Eurovision songs performed by co-presenters Oleksandr Skichko and Volodymyr Ostapchuk, while the interval featured a dance performance by Apache Crew titled "The Children's Courtyard". In the interval of the final, Jamala performed her new single "I Believe in U", and Onuka performed a megamix together with Ukraine's National Academic Orchestra of Folk Instruments.

== Contest overview ==
=== Semi-final 1 ===
The first semi-final took place on 9 May 2017 at 22:00 EEST (21:00 CEST). 18 countries participated in the first semi-final. All the countries competing in this semi-final were eligible to vote, plus Italy, Spain and the United Kingdom. The highlighted countries qualified for the final.

Qualifiers

Results of the first semi-final of the Eurovision Song Contest 2017
R/O	Country	Artist	Song	Points	Place
1	Sweden	Robin Bengtsson	"I Can't Go On"	227	3
2	Georgia	Tamara Gachechiladze	"Keep the Faith"	99	11
3	Australia	Isaiah	"Don't Come Easy"	160	6
4	Albania	Lindita	"World"	76	14
5	Belgium	Blanche	"City Lights"	165	4
6	Montenegro	Slavko Kalezić	"Space"	56	16
7	Finland	Norma John	"Blackbird"	92	12
8	Azerbaijan	Dihaj	"Skeletons"	150	8
9	Portugal	Salvador Sobral	"Amar pelos dois"	370	1
10	Greece	Demy	"This Is Love"	115	10
11	Poland	Kasia Moś	"Flashlight"	119	9
12	Moldova	SunStroke Project	"Hey Mamma"	291	2
13	Iceland	Svala	"Paper"	60	15
14	Czech Republic	Martina Bárta	"My Turn"	83	13
15	Cyprus	Hovig	"Gravity"	164	5
16	Armenia	Artsvik	"Fly with Me"	152	7
17	Slovenia	Omar Naber	"On My Way"	36	17
18	Latvia	Triana Park	"Line"	21	18

=== Semi-final 2 ===
The second semi-final took place on 11 May 2017 at 22:00 EEST (21:00 CEST). 18 countries participated in the second semi-final. All the countries competing in this semi-final were eligible to vote, plus France, Germany and Ukraine voted in this semi-final. Russia was originally set to perform in position three, but later withdrew from the contest after the artist it selected was banned from entering Ukraine, resulting in countries originally planned to perform fourth and later, to do so one place earlier. The highlighted countries qualified for the final.

Qualifiers

Results of the second semi-final of the Eurovision Song Contest 2017
R/O	Country	Artist	Song	Points	Place
1	Serbia	Tijana Bogićević	"In Too Deep"	98	11
2	Austria	Nathan Trent	"Running on Air"	147	7
3	Macedonia	Jana Burčeska	"Dance Alone"	69	15
4	Malta	Claudia Faniello	"Breathlessly"	55	16
5	Romania	Ilinca feat. Alex Florea	"Yodel It!"	174	6
6	Netherlands	Og3ne	"Lights and Shadows"	200	4
7	Hungary	Joci Pápai	"Origo"	231	2
8	Denmark	Anja	"Where I Am"	101	10
9	Ireland	Brendan Murray	"Dying to Try"	86	13
10	San Marino	Valentina Monetta and Jimmie Wilson	"Spirit of the Night"	1	18
11	Croatia	Jacques Houdek	"My Friend"	141	8
12	Norway	Jowst	"Grab the Moment"	189	5
13	Switzerland	Timebelle	"Apollo"	97	12
14	Belarus	Naviband	"Story of My Life"	110	9
15	Bulgaria	Kristian Kostov	"Beautiful Mess"	403	1
16	Lithuania	Fusedmarc	"Rain of Revolution"	42	17
17	Estonia	Koit Toome and Laura	"Verona"	85	14
18	Israel	Imri	"I Feel Alive"	207	3

=== Final ===
The final took place on 13 May 2017 at 22:00 EEST (21:00 CEST). The "Big Five", and the host country, Ukraine, qualified directly for the final. From the two semi-finals on 9 and 11 May 2017, twenty countries qualified for the final.

26 countries participated in the final, with all 42 participating countries eligible to vote. The running order for the final was revealed after the second semi-final qualifiers' press conference on 11 May.

Portugal won with 758 points, winning both the jury vote and the televote. Bulgaria came second with 615 points, with Moldova, Belgium, Sweden, Italy, Romania, Hungary, Australia and Norway completing the top ten. Poland, Israel, Ukraine, Germany and Spain occupied the bottom five positions.

Winner

Results of the final of the Eurovision Song Contest 2017
R/O	Country	Artist	Song	Points	Place
1	Israel	Imri	"I Feel Alive"	39	23
2	Poland	Kasia Moś	"Flashlight"	64	22
3	Belarus	Naviband	"Story of My Life"	83	17
4	Austria	Nathan Trent	"Running on Air"	93	16
5	Armenia	Artsvik	"Fly with Me"	79	18
6	Netherlands	Og3ne	"Lights and Shadows"	150	11
7	Moldova	SunStroke Project	"Hey Mamma"	374	3
8	Hungary	Joci Pápai	"Origo"	200	8
9	Italy	Francesco Gabbani	"Occidentali's Karma"	334	6
10	Denmark	Anja	"Where I Am"	77	20
11	Portugal	Salvador Sobral	"Amar pelos dois"	758	1
12	Azerbaijan	Dihaj	"Skeletons"	120	14
13	Croatia	Jacques Houdek	"My Friend"	128	13
14	Australia	Isaiah	"Don't Come Easy"	173	9
15	Greece	Demy	"This Is Love"	77	19
16	Spain	Manel Navarro	"Do It for Your Lover"	5	26
17	Norway	Jowst	"Grab the Moment"	158	10
18	United Kingdom	Lucie Jones	"Never Give Up on You"	111	15
19	Cyprus	Hovig	"Gravity"	68	21
20	Romania	Ilinca feat. Alex Florea	"Yodel It!"	282	7
21	Germany	Levina	"Perfect Life"	6	25
22	Ukraine	O.Torvald	"Time"	36	24
23	Belgium	Blanche	"City Lights"	363	4
24	Sweden	Robin Bengtsson	"I Can't Go On"	344	5
25	Bulgaria	Kristian Kostov	"Beautiful Mess"	615	2
26	France	Alma	"Requiem"	135	12

==== Spokespersons ====
The spokespersons announced the 12-point score from their respective country's national jury in the following order:

1. Sweden – Wiktoria
2. Azerbaijan – Tural Asadov
3. San Marino – Lia Fiorio
4. Latvia – Aminata
5. Israel – Ofer Nachshon
6. Montenegro – Tijana Mišković
7. Albania – Andri Xhahu
8. Malta – Martha Fenech
9. Macedonia – Ilija Grujoski
10. Denmark – Ulla Essendrop
11. Austria – Kristina Inhof
12. Norway – Marcus & Martinus
13. Spain – Nieves Álvarez
14. Finland – Jenni Vartiainen
15. France – Élodie Gossuin
16. Greece – Constantinos Christoforou
17. Lithuania – Eglė Daugėlaitė
18. Estonia – Jüri Pootsmann
19. Moldova – Gloria Gorceag
20. Armenia – Iveta Mukuchyan
21. Bulgaria – Boryana Gramatikova
22. Iceland – Bo Halldórsson
23. Serbia – Sanja Vučić
24. Australia – Lee Lin Chin
25. Italy – Giulia Valentina Palermo
26. Germany – Barbara Schöneberger
27. Portugal – Filomena Cautela
28. Switzerland – Luca Hänni
29. Netherlands – Douwe Bob
30. Ireland – Nicky Byrne
31. Georgia – Nika Kocharov
32. Cyprus – Giannis Karagiannis
33. Belarus – Alyona Lanskaya
34. Romania – Sonia Argint-Ionescu
35. Hungary – Csilla Tatár
36. Slovenia – Katarina Čas
37. Belgium – Fanny Gillard
38. Poland – Anna Popek
39. United Kingdom – Katrina Leskanich
40. Croatia – Uršula Tolj
41. Czech Republic – Radka Rosická
42. Ukraine – Zlata Ognevich

== Detailed voting results ==
=== Semi-final 1 ===
Qualifiers

Split results of semi-final 1
Place	Combined results		Jury		Televoting	
Place	Country	Points	Country	Points	Country	Points
1	Portugal	370	Portugal	173	Portugal	197
2	Moldova	291	Australia	139	Moldova	180
3	Sweden	227	Sweden	124	Belgium	125
4	Belgium	165	Moldova	111	Sweden	103
5	Cyprus	164	Azerbaijan	87	Cyprus	103
6	Australia	160	Armenia	87	Poland	69
7	Armenia	152	Czech Republic	81	Armenia	65
8	Azerbaijan	150	Georgia	62	Azerbaijan	63
9	Poland	119	Greece	61	Greece	54
10	Greece	115	Cyprus	61	Finland	51
11	Georgia	99	Poland	50	Montenegro	39
12	Finland	92	Finland	41	Albania	38
13	Czech Republic	83	Belgium	40	Georgia	37
14	Albania	76	Albania	38	Iceland	31
15	Iceland	60	Iceland	29	Australia	21
16	Montenegro	56	Montenegro	17	Slovenia	20
17	Slovenia	36	Slovenia	16	Latvia	20
18	Latvia	21	Latvia	1	Czech Republic	2

Detailed jury voting results of semi-final 1
Voting procedure used: 100% televoting; 100% jury vote		Total score	Jury score	Televoting score	Jury vote																				
Voting procedure used: 100% televoting; 100% jury vote		Total score	Jury score	Televoting score	Sweden	Georgia	Australia	Albania	Belgium	Montenegro	Finland	Azerbaijan	Portugal	Greece	Poland	Moldova	Iceland	Czech Republic	Cyprus	Armenia	Slovenia	Latvia	Italy	Spain	United Kingdom
Contestants	**Sweden**	227	124	103		8	8	4	**12**	6	**12**		5	2	4	8	8	10	8	5	7	2	10	3	2
Contestants	Georgia	99	62	37	6			1	3		3	6	3	4	10	5	7			6	5		2		1
Contestants	**Australia**	160	139	21	**12**	6		5	10	3	8	7	6		8	6	10	**12**	7	1	**12**	10	1	8	7
Contestants	Albania	76	38	38						10		10		10									8		
Contestants	**Belgium**	165	40	125	3			3						1	7		2	3	3		2	5	5	2	4
Contestants	Montenegro	56	17	39								8		7				2							
Contestants	Finland	92	41	51	7		7						7		1	3	3	1	6		6				
Contestants	**Azerbaijan**	150	87	63		10	3	7	5	7			8	8		4	6	4	4		3	1	**12**	5	
Contestants	**Portugal**	370	173	197	5	**12**	6	6	7	4	10	**12**		5	**12**	**12**	**12**	7	10	7	8	**12**	4	**12**	10
Contestants	**Greece**	115	61	54			1	8		**12**			2		2	7	1		**12**	10				6	
Contestants	**Poland**	119	50	69			**12**	2	4		2	3	1			1		8	2	2	4	3			6
Contestants	**Moldova**	291	111	180	10	3	10	**12**	1	5	6	5	10	3				6		8		6	7	7	**12**
Contestants	Iceland	60	29	31	2	2	2		2		5	2				2				3		8		1	
Contestants	Czech Republic	83	81	2	4	1	4		6	2		4	**12**		3		5		1	4	10	7		10	8
Contestants	**Cyprus**	164	61	103	8	5			8		7			6			4	5		**12**			3		3
Contestants	**Armenia**	152	87	65		7	5	10		8	4		4	**12**	6	10			5		1	4	6		5
Contestants	Slovenia	36	16	20	1	4				1	1				5									4	
Contestants	Latvia	21	1	20								1													

Detailed televoting results of semi-final 1
Voting procedure used: 100% televoting; 100% jury vote		Total score	Jury score	Televoting score	Televote																				
Voting procedure used: 100% televoting; 100% jury vote		Total score	Jury score	Televoting score	Sweden	Georgia	Australia	Albania	Belgium	Montenegro	Finland	Azerbaijan	Portugal	Greece	Poland	Moldova	Iceland	Czech Republic	Cyprus	Armenia	Slovenia	Latvia	Italy	Spain	United Kingdom
Contestants	**Sweden**	227	124	103		4	8	10	5	3	7	6	10	3	5	1	10	2	5	4	5	7	1	6	1
Contestants	Georgia	99	62	37								**12**	6	6		2			1	8			2		
Contestants	**Australia**	160	139	21	2			1	1	1		2					6		2	3	3				
Contestants	Albania	76	38	38						**12**		3		5		10					1		7		
Contestants	**Belgium**	165	40	125	10	5	4	8		2	10	7	8	4	8		7	6	4	6	8	10	6	8	4
Contestants	Montenegro	56	17	39	1		7				3	5				8	2			1	6		5	1	
Contestants	Finland	92	41	51	8		2	5	3				7	1	4		3	3			2	5		5	3
Contestants	**Azerbaijan**	150	87	63		**12**	1			6			1			**12**		**12**	10		7	2			
Contestants	**Portugal**	370	173	197	**12**	8	10	**12**	**12**	7	**12**	8		10	**12**	6	**12**	7	6	7	**12**	**12**	10	**12**	10
Contestants	**Greece**	115	61	54		2	3	6	6	4			5		2				**12**	5			4		5
Contestants	**Poland**	119	50	69	6	3		2	8			1		2		3	5	8	3	2		3	8	3	**12**
Contestants	**Moldova**	291	111	180	5	6	**12**	7	10	10	8	10	**12**	7	10		8	10	7	10	10	8	**12**	10	8
Contestants	Iceland	60	29	31	7	1		4			5				1							4		7	2
Contestants	Czech Republic	83	81	2									2												
Contestants	**Cyprus**	164	61	103	4	7	6	3	4	5	6		3	**12**	7	7	4	4		**12**	4	6	3		6
Contestants	**Armenia**	152	87	65	3	10	5		7		4			8	6	4		5	8			1		4	
Contestants	Slovenia	36	16	20					2	8	2		4		3			1							
Contestants	Latvia	21	1	20							1	4				5	1							2	7

==== 12 points ====
Below is a summary of the maximum 12 points awarded by each country's professional jury and televote in the first semi-final. Countries in bold gave the maximum 24 points (12 points apiece from professional jury and televoting) to the specified entrant.

12 points awarded by juries
N.	Contestant	Nation(s) giving 12 points
7	Portugal	Azerbaijan, Georgia, **Iceland**, **Latvia**, Moldova, **Poland**, **Spain**
3	Australia	Czech Republic, Slovenia, Sweden
2	Greece	**Cyprus**, Montenegro
2	Moldova	Albania, United Kingdom
2	Sweden	Belgium, Finland
1	Armenia	Greece
1	Azerbaijan	Italy
1	Cyprus	**Armenia**
1	Czech Republic	Portugal
1	Poland	Australia

12 points awarded by televoting
N.	Contestant	Nation(s) giving 12 points
9	Portugal	Albania, Belgium, Finland, **Iceland**, **Latvia**, **Poland**, Slovenia, **Spain**, Sweden
3	Azerbaijan	Czech Republic, Georgia, Moldova
3	Moldova	Australia, Italy, Portugal
2	Cyprus	**Armenia**, Greece
1	Albania	Montenegro
1	Georgia	Azerbaijan
1	Greece	**Cyprus**
1	Poland	United Kingdom

=== Semi-final 2 ===
Qualifiers

Split results of semi-final 2
Place	Combined results		Jury		Televoting	
Place	Country	Points	Country	Points	Country	Points
1	Bulgaria	403	Bulgaria	199	Bulgaria	204
2	Hungary	231	Netherlands	149	Hungary	165
3	Israel	207	Norway	137	Romania	148
4	Netherlands	200	Austria	115	Israel	132
5	Norway	189	Denmark	96	Croatia	104
6	Romania	174	Israel	75	Estonia	69
7	Austria	147	Hungary	66	Belarus	55
8	Croatia	141	Malta	55	Norway	52
9	Belarus	110	Belarus	55	Netherlands	51
10	Denmark	101	Serbia	53	Switzerland	49
11	Serbia	98	Switzerland	48	Serbia	45
12	Switzerland	97	Ireland	45	Ireland	41
13	Ireland	86	Croatia	37	Macedonia	40
14	Estonia	85	Macedonia	29	Austria	32
15	Macedonia	69	Romania	26	Lithuania	25
16	Malta	55	Lithuania	17	Denmark	5
17	Lithuania	42	Estonia	16	San Marino	1
18	San Marino	1	San Marino	0	Malta	0

Detailed jury voting results of semi-final 2
Voting procedure used: 100% televoting; 100% jury vote		Total score	Jury score	Televoting score	Jury vote																				
Voting procedure used: 100% televoting; 100% jury vote		Total score	Jury score	Televoting score	Serbia	Austria	Macedonia	Malta	Romania	Netherlands	Hungary	Denmark	Ireland	San Marino	Croatia	Norway	Switzerland	Belarus	Bulgaria	Lithuania	Estonia	Israel	France	Germany	Ukraine
Contestants	Serbia	98	53	45				2		6	4	8	2	2	2	6	6	4	2		1		1	7	
Contestants	**Austria**	147	115	32	6		3		5	8	8	7	10	7	5	4	7	6	**12**	4	5	8	4	6	
Contestants	Macedonia	69	29	40	5			8			2					3							8		3
Contestants	Malta	55	55	0	2	6	8		1	3			5	1	1			5	7	1	4	2	6	3	
Contestants	**Romania**	174	26	148			10	4		1			4									3			4
Contestants	**Netherlands**	200	149	51	8	8	6	6	**12**		10	10	3	**12**	**12**	8	8	8	8	5	6		5	8	6
Contestants	**Hungary**	231	66	165	**12**	3	5					3		3	10	2	5			2	2	**12**			7
Contestants	**Denmark**	101	96	5	4		7	5	10	10	6		1	5	8	10	3	2	4	6	8	4	2	1	
Contestants	Ireland	86	45	41		10		1	3		5	2					2		1	8	7			4	2
Contestants	San Marino	1	0	1																					
Contestants	**Croatia**	141	37	104	3	1			7	2				4		1		3	6					5	5
Contestants	**Norway**	189	137	52	1	5			2	7	7	**12**	7	10	4		10	10	5	**12**	10	10	3	**12**	10
Contestants	Switzerland	97	48	49		4	1		6	4		4	8			5			3	7	3	1		2	
Contestants	**Belarus**	110	55	55		7		7			3				7		1			3		5	10		**12**
Contestants	**Bulgaria**	403	199	204	10	**12**	**12**	**12**	8	**12**	**12**	6	**12**	8	6	**12**	**12**	**12**		10	**12**	6	7	10	8
Contestants	Lithuania	42	17	25			4							6				7							
Contestants	Estonia	85	16	69		2	2	3				1						1				7			
Contestants	**Israel**	207	75	132	7			10	4	5	1	5	6		3	7	4		10				**12**		1

Detailed televoting results of semi-final 2
Voting procedure used: 100% televoting; 100% jury vote		Total score	Jury score	Televoting score	Televote																				
Voting procedure used: 100% televoting; 100% jury vote		Total score	Jury score	Televoting score	Serbia	Austria	Macedonia	Malta	Romania	Netherlands	Hungary	Denmark	Ireland	San Marino	Croatia	Norway	Switzerland	Belarus	Bulgaria	Lithuania	Estonia	Israel	France	Germany	Ukraine
Contestants	Serbia	98	53	45		6	**12**								10		**12**						5		
Contestants	**Austria**	147	115	32	1			1	4	6	3	3		1	4		2					3		4	
Contestants	Macedonia	69	29	40	10									4	6		3		**12**			5			
Contestants	Malta	55	55	0																					
Contestants	**Romania**	174	26	148	6	7	3	7		8	7	8	8	8	7	8	7	5	7	6	**12**	10	**12**	7	5
Contestants	**Netherlands**	200	149	51		4	2	3			6	7	5	3	2	3	4		1		2	4		5	
Contestants	**Hungary**	231	66	165	**12**	**12**	6	6	**12**	10		4	6	10	**12**	6	8	10	8	5	8	7	7	10	6
Contestants	**Denmark**	101	96	5						1						4									
Contestants	Ireland	86	45	41		3	1	4	6	2		5		2		2		3		4	7	1	1		
Contestants	San Marino	1	0	1																				1	
Contestants	**Croatia**	141	37	104	7	10	8	8	5	4	10		7	6		1	10	4	6	2	5		2	6	3
Contestants	**Norway**	189	137	52	3				2	5	5	10	2					6	3	7	3			2	4
Contestants	Switzerland	97	48	49	4	2	5	5	10		1	1		5	1			2	4	1		2	4		2
Contestants	**Belarus**	110	55	55	2	1			1	3	2		1		3				5	8	6	8	3		**12**
Contestants	**Bulgaria**	403	199	204	8	8	10	**12**	8	**12**	**12**	**12**	10	**12**	8	**12**	6	**12**		10	10	**12**	8	**12**	10
Contestants	Lithuania	42	17	25									**12**			10		1			1				1
Contestants	Estonia	85	16	69			4	2	3		4	2	3			5	1	8	2	**12**		6	6	3	8
Contestants	**Israel**	207	75	132	5	5	7	10	7	7	8	6	4	7	5	7	5	7	10	3	4		10	8	7

==== 12 points ====
Below is a summary of the maximum 12 points awarded by each country's professional jury and televote in the second semi-final. Countries in bold gave the maximum 24 points (12 points apiece from professional jury and televoting) to the specified entrant.

12 points awarded by juries
N.	Contestant	Nation(s) giving 12 points
10	Bulgaria	Austria, **Belarus**, Estonia, **Hungary**, Ireland, Macedonia, **Malta**, **Netherlands**, **Norway**, Switzerland
3	Netherlands	Croatia, Romania, San Marino
3	Norway	Denmark, Germany, Lithuania
2	Hungary	Israel, **Serbia**
1	Austria	Bulgaria
1	Belarus	**Ukraine**
1	Israel	France

12 points awarded by televoting
N.	Contestant	Nation(s) giving 12 points
9	Bulgaria	**Belarus**, Denmark, Germany, **Hungary**, Israel, **Malta**, **Netherlands**, **Norway**, San Marino
4	Hungary	Austria, Croatia, Romania, **Serbia**
2	Romania	Estonia, France
2	Serbia	Macedonia, Switzerland
1	Belarus	**Ukraine**
1	Estonia	Lithuania
1	Lithuania	Ireland
1	Macedonia	Bulgaria

=== Final ===
Winner

Split results of the final
Place	Combined		Jury		Televoting	
Place	Country	Points	Country	Points	Country	Points
1	Portugal	758	Portugal	382	Portugal	376
2	Bulgaria	615	Bulgaria	278	Bulgaria	337
3	Moldova	374	Sweden	218	Moldova	264
4	Belgium	363	Australia	171	Belgium	255
5	Sweden	344	Netherlands	135	Romania	224
6	Italy	334	Norway	129	Italy	208
7	Romania	282	Italy	126	Hungary	152
8	Hungary	200	Moldova	110	Sweden	126
9	Australia	173	Belgium	108	Croatia	103
10	Norway	158	United Kingdom	99	France	90
11	Netherlands	150	Austria	93	Azerbaijan	42
12	France	135	Azerbaijan	78	Poland	41
13	Croatia	128	Denmark	69	Belarus	33
14	Azerbaijan	120	Armenia	58	Cyprus	32
15	United Kingdom	111	Romania	58	Norway	29
16	Austria	93	Belarus	50	Greece	29
17	Belarus	83	Hungary	48	Ukraine	24
18	Armenia	79	Greece	48	Armenia	21
19	Greece	77 (Note: Despite finishing with the same number of points as Denmark, Greece is deemed to have finished in nineteenth place due to receiving a greater number of points in the televote.)	France	45	Netherlands	15
20	Denmark	77	Cyprus	36	United Kingdom	12
21	Cyprus	68	Israel	34	Denmark	8
22	Poland	64	Croatia	25	Israel	5
23	Israel	39	Poland	23	Spain	5
24	Ukraine	36	Ukraine	12	Germany	3
25	Germany	6	Germany	3	Australia	2
26	Spain	5	Spain	0	Austria	0

Detailed jury voting results of the final
Voting procedure used: 100% televoting; 100% jury vote		Total score	Jury score	Televoting score	Jury vote																																									
Voting procedure used: 100% televoting; 100% jury vote		Total score	Jury score	Televoting score	Sweden	Azerbaijan	San Marino	Latvia	Israel	Montenegro	Albania	Malta	Macedonia	Denmark	Austria	Norway	Spain	Finland	France	Greece	Lithuania	Estonia	Moldova	Armenia	Bulgaria	Iceland	Serbia	Australia	Italy	Germany	Portugal	Switzerland	Netherlands	Ireland	Georgia	Cyprus	Belarus	Romania	Hungary	Slovenia	Belgium	Poland	United Kingdom	Croatia	Czech Republic	Ukraine
Contestants	Israel	39	34	5		4						7				5			6						8		1										1	2								
Contestants	Poland	64	23	41		6	1																		7			2									2			4					1	
Contestants	Belarus	83	50	33		**12**		2	1			2			7					3			3		2																		1	5		**12**
Contestants	Austria	93	93	0	4			6		1				7			3		1		5		2	1	**12**		4	3	1	2	10		3	7	5		4	1			3		3	1	4	
Contestants	Armenia	79	58	21			4			4	7	1		1						8	3		6		4		5	1	4						3				2	3		2				
Contestants	Netherlands	150	135	15	3		7							5	**12**	4	1		4		2	4			10			4		7	3	7		4	1		5	**12**	8	1		8	4	8	8	3
Contestants	Moldova	374	110	264	8	10		1	3				6	3		2	7	3		7				8			7	10	8		6							8					6		3	4
Contestants	Hungary	200	48	152								3			5							1	1			4	10			1		3												**12**		8
Contestants	Italy	334	126	208	6		3		2	8	**12**	**12**			6	7	10	7	10	4	8			2		5	8					2			2	10				2						
Contestants	Denmark	77	69	8	5								7			8		4				5				3		5					8				3	5	5				2	3	6	
Contestants	**Portugal**	**758**	382	376	**12**	8	**12**	**12**	**12**		6	10	10	10	8	10	**12**	8	**12**	5	**12**	8	7	**12**		**12**	**12**	7	5	10		**12**	**12**	5	**12**	8	10	6	**12**	**12**	8	**12**	**12**	7	**12**	10
Contestants	Azerbaijan	120	78	42			5				2									10			5		5				**12**		**12**			1	10	1			4		4	1				6
Contestants	Croatia	128	25	103		1				5		6																		3								3								7
Contestants	Australia	173	171	2	10			5			4		8	8		3	8	10	2		1	7	4			10	3			5	5	4	4			4	7	4	7	7	6	7	10	6	10	2
Contestants	Greece	77	48	29		5				**12**	1						2							10	6											**12**										
Contestants	Spain	5	0	5																																										
Contestants	Norway	158	129	29			10	7	5				2	6	3			1	7		10	10		5		1			3	**12**	2	5	7	2	7		6		6		7	3		2		
Contestants	United Kingdom	111	99	12			6	4			8		3		1	1		2	3	1		6		4		7		**12**		6			5			5			3	10	2	5			5	
Contestants	Cyprus	68	36	32	2													5		**12**				7							1				4						5					
Contestants	Romania	282	58	224		3		3		10	3	5	4							6			**12**		3								1	8												
Contestants	Germany	6	3	3																														3												
Contestants	Ukraine	36	12	24		7			4																1																					
Contestants	Belgium	363	108	255	1		8	10	8	6				2	2		4				4	2				2			7		8	6	2	**12**		3				5		10	5			1
Contestants	Sweden	344	218	126					10	7			1	**12**	4	6	5	**12**	8		6	3	8	6		8	2	6	10	4	7	10	6	6	8	6	8	7	1	6	**12**	4	8	4	7	
Contestants	Bulgaria	615	278	337	7	2	2	8	7	2	10	8	**12**	4	10	**12**	6	6	5	2	7	**12**	10			6	6	8	2	8		8	10	10	6	7	**12**	10	10	8	10	6	7	10	2	
Contestants	France	135	45	90					6	3	5	4	5											3					6		4	1				2					1					5

Detailed televoting results of the final
Voting procedure used: 100% televoting; 100% jury vote		Total score	Jury score	Televoting score	Televote																																									
Voting procedure used: 100% televoting; 100% jury vote		Total score	Jury score	Televoting score	Sweden	Azerbaijan	San Marino	Latvia	Israel	Montenegro	Albania	Malta	Macedonia	Denmark	Austria	Norway	Spain	Finland	France	Greece	Lithuania	Estonia	Moldova	Armenia	Bulgaria	Iceland	Serbia	Australia	Italy	Germany	Portugal	Switzerland	Netherlands	Ireland	Georgia	Cyprus	Belarus	Romania	Hungary	Slovenia	Belgium	Poland	United Kingdom	Croatia	Czech Republic	Ukraine
Contestants	Israel	39	34	5		1							1						3																											
Contestants	Poland	64	23	41	5										2	3			1							3			3	2			1	7							4		10			
Contestants	Belarus	83	50	33				6	2												1	2	1												6							4			3	8
Contestants	Austria	93	93	0																																										
Contestants	Armenia	79	58	21															6	2															10	1									2	
Contestants	Netherlands	150	135	15										1			2													1											10			1		
Contestants	Moldova	374	110	264	8	10	8	8	5	3		1	2	8	3	6	6	5	7	6	8	4		6	10	6	7	**12**	**12**	7	**12**		5	8		6	10	**12**	10	3	7	6	6	4	5	**12**
Contestants	Hungary	200	48	152	4	7	4	2	1	7	6	2	3	3	5	4		4	2		2	8			6	2	**12**		4	3	2	5	6	2			8	10		5	1	5	1	**12**		4
Contestants	Italy	334	126	208	1	6	10	3	8	10	**12**	**12**	8		6	2	8	8	5	7	5	5	4	4		7	6	2		4	4	10	2	1	5	8		6	4	10	5		2	7	1	
Contestants	Denmark	77	69	8																								8																		
Contestants	**Portugal**	**758**	382	376	10	8	7	10	**12**	8	8	8	7	5	**12**	**12**	**12**	**12**	**12**	8	**12**	10	6	10	7	**12**	8	7	5	**12**		**12**	**12**	10	8	7	7	7	7	8	**12**	10	8	10	8	10
Contestants	Azerbaijan	120	78	42			1			5													10												**12**					4					10	
Contestants	Croatia	128	25	103	2		3			**12**	7	3	10		4	1									1		5	1	6	8		8	3	3				3	5	**12**		1	5			
Contestants	Australia	173	171	2										2																																
Contestants	Greece	77	48	29							3												7	1	5											**12**		1								
Contestants	Spain	5	0	5																											5															
Contestants	Norway	158	129	29	6			1						7				2			6					1											5									1
Contestants	United Kingdom	111	99	12								4					1											3						4												
Contestants	Cyprus	68	36	32						1										**12**				**12**	3										2				2							
Contestants	Romania	282	58	224	3	2	6	5	7		4	6		4	10	10	7	3	10	1	4	6	**12**	2	8	5	4	10	10	6	7	4	7	**12**		4	2		6	2	6	7	7	6	6	3
Contestants	Germany	6	3	3																												3														
Contestants	Ukraine	36	12	24																									7		3				4		1					2			7	
Contestants	Belgium	363	108	255	**12**	4	5	**12**	6	4	5	5	4	6	8	7	4	10	8	5	10	**12**	2	5	4	10	3	4	2	10	10	7	10	5		2	6	5	8	6		**12**	3	5	4	5
Contestants	Sweden	344	218	126		3	2	4	3		2	7	5	**12**	1	5	5	6		3	3	3	3	3	2	8	1	6			1	1	4		1	5	3	2	3	1	2	3	4	2		7
Contestants	Bulgaria	615	278	337	7	**12**	**12**	7	10	6	10	10	**12**	10	7	8	10	7	4	10	7	7	8	7		4	10	5	8	5	8	6	8	6	7	10	**12**	8	**12**	7	8	8	**12**	8	**12**	2
Contestants	France	135	45	90		5			4	2	1		6				3	1		4		1	5	8	**12**		2		1		6	2			3	3	4	4	1		3			3		6

==== 12 points ====
Below is a summary of the maximum 12 points awarded by each country's professional jury and televote in the final. Countries in bold gave the maximum 24 points (12 points apiece from professional jury and televoting) to the specified entrant.

12 points awarded by juries
N.	Contestant	Nation(s) giving 12 points
18	Portugal	Armenia, Czech Republic, **France**, Georgia, Hungary, **Iceland**, **Israel**, Latvia, **Lithuania**, **Netherlands**, Poland, San Marino, Serbia, Slovenia, **Spain**, Sweden, **Switzerland**, United Kingdom
4	Bulgaria	**Belarus**, Estonia, **Macedonia**, Norway
3	Sweden	Belgium, **Denmark**, Finland
2	Azerbaijan	Italy, Portugal
2	Belarus	Azerbaijan, Ukraine
2	Greece	**Cyprus**, Montenegro
2	Italy	**Albania**, **Malta**
2	Netherlands	Austria, Romania
1	Austria	Bulgaria
1	Belgium	Ireland
1	Cyprus	**Greece**
1	Hungary	**Croatia**
1	Norway	Germany
1	Romania	**Moldova**
1	United Kingdom	Australia

12 points awarded by televoting
N.	Contestant	Nation(s) giving 12 points
12	Portugal	Austria, Belgium, Finland, **France**, Germany, **Iceland**, **Israel**, **Lithuania**, **Netherlands**, Norway, **Spain**, **Switzerland**
7	Bulgaria	Azerbaijan, **Belarus**, Czech Republic, Hungary, **Macedonia**, San Marino, United Kingdom
5	Moldova	Australia, Italy, Portugal, Romania, Ukraine
4	Belgium	Estonia, Latvia, Poland, Sweden
2	Croatia	Montenegro, Slovenia
2	Cyprus	Armenia, **Greece**
2	Hungary	**Croatia**, Serbia
2	Italy	**Albania**, **Malta**
2	Romania	Ireland, **Moldova**
1	Azerbaijan	Georgia
1	France	Bulgaria
1	Greece	**Cyprus**
1	Sweden	**Denmark**

== Broadcasts ==
Most countries sent commentators to Kyiv or commentated from their own country, in order to add insight to the participants and, if necessary, the provision of voting information. The EBU announced on 9 May, that all three shows would also be streamed live via YouTube.

It was reported by the EBU that the contest was viewed by a worldwide television audience of approximately 182 million viewers, which was 22 million less than the 2016 record which was viewed by 204 million. The EBU stated that this decrease in viewing figures was likely a result of the withdrawal of Russia and its decision not to broadcast any of the three shows.

Broadcasters and commentators in participating countries
Country	Broadcaster	Channel(s)	Show(s)	Commentator(s)	Ref(s)
Armenia	AMPTV	Armenia 1, Public Radio of Armenia	All shows	Avet Barseghyan	
Armenia	AMPTV	Armenia 1, Public Radio of Armenia	SF1/Final	Gohar Gasparyan	
Australia	SBS	SBS	All shows	Myf Warhurst and Joel Creasey	
Austria	ORF	ORF eins	All shows	Andi Knoll	
Belarus	BTRC	Belarus-1, Belarus 24	All shows	Evgeny Perlin	
Belgium	RTBF	La Une	All shows	Jean-Louis Lahaye and Maureen Louys	
Belgium	RTBF	VivaCité	SF1/Final	Olivier Gilain	
Belgium	VRT	één, Radio 2	All shows	Peter Van de Veire	
Croatia	HRT	HRT 1	All shows	Duško Ćurlić	
Croatia	HRT	HR 2	All shows	Zlatko Turkalj	
Cyprus	CyBC	CyBC	All shows	Tasos Tryfonos and Christiana Artemiou	
Czech Republic	ČT	ČT2	Semi-finals	Libor Bouček	
Denmark	DR	DR1	All shows	Ole Tøpholm	
Estonia	ERR	ETV	All shows	Marko Reikop	
Estonia	ERR	ETV+	All shows	Aleksandr Hobotov and Julia Kalenda	
Estonia	ERR	Raadio 2	SF2/Final	Mart Juur and Andrus Kivirähk	
Finland	Yle	Yle TV1	SF1	Finnish: Mikko Silvennoinen; Swedish: Eva Frantz and Johan Lindroos	
Finland	Yle	Yle TV2	SF2/Final	Finnish: Mikko Silvennoinen; Swedish: Eva Frantz and Johan Lindroos	
France	France Télévisions	France 4	Semi-finals	Marianne James and Jarry	
France	France Télévisions	France 2	Final	Marianne James, Stéphane Bern and Amir Haddad	
Germany	ARD	One	All shows	Peter Urban	
Germany	ARD	NDR Fernsehen	SF2	Peter Urban	
Germany	ARD	Das Erste	Final	Peter Urban	
Greece	ERT	ERT1, ERT HD, ERT World	All shows	Maria Kozakou and Giorgos Kapoutzidis	
Greece	ERT	Proto Programma, Voice of Greece	All shows	Maria Kozakou and Giorgos Kapoutzidis	
Hungary	MTVA	Duna	All shows	Krisztina Rátonyi and Freddie	
Ireland	RTÉ	RTÉ2	Semi-finals	Marty Whelan	
Ireland	RTÉ	RTÉ One	Final	Marty Whelan	
Ireland	RTÉ	RTÉ Radio 1	SF2/Final	Neil Doherty and Zbyszek Zalinski	
Israel	IBA	Channel 1	All shows	No commentary	
Israel	IBA	IBA 88FM	All shows	Kobi Menora, Dori Ben Ze'ev and Alon Amir	
Italy	RAI	Rai 4	Semi-finals	Andrea Delogu and Diego Passoni	
Italy	RAI	Rai 1	Final	Flavio Insinna and Federico Russo	
Latvia	LTV	LTV1	All shows	Valters Frīdenbergs	
Lithuania	LRT	LRT, LRT HD, LRT Radijas	All shows	Darius Užkuraitis and Gerūta Griniūtė	
Macedonia	MRT	MRT 1	All shows	Karolina Petkovska	
Moldova	TRM	Moldova 1	All shows	Galina Timuș	
Moldova	TRM	Radio Moldova	All shows	Cristina Galbici	
Moldova	TRM	Radio Moldova Tineret	All shows	Cătălin Ungureanu and Maria-Mihaela Frimu	
Montenegro	RTCG	TVCG 1, TVCG Sat	All shows	Dražen Bauković and Tijana Mišković	
Netherlands	AVROTROS	NPO 1, BVN	All shows	Cornald Maas and Jan Smit	
Norway	NRK	NRK1	All shows	Olav Viksmo-Slettan	
Norway	NRK	NRK3	Final	Ronny Brede Aase, Silje Nordnes and Markus Neby	
Norway	NRK	NRK Tegnspråk	Final	Sign language performers	
Norway	NRK	NRK P1	SF2/Final	Ole Christian Øen	
Poland	TVP	TVP1, TVP Polonia, TVP Rozrywka and TVP HD	All shows (Note: The three shows were broadcast on TVP Rozrywka and TVP HD with a one day delay.)	Artur Orzech	
Portugal	RTP	RTP1, RTP Internacional	All shows	José Carlos Malato and Nuno Galopim	
Romania	TVR	TVR 1, TVR HD	All shows	Liana Stanciu and Radu Andrei Tudor	
San Marino	SMRTV	San Marino RTV, Radio San Marino	All shows	Lia Fiorio and Gigi Restivo	
Serbia	RTS	RTS1, RTS HD, RTS SAT	SF1	Silvana Grujić and Olga Kapor	
Serbia	RTS	RTS1, RTS HD, RTS SAT	SF2/Final	Duška Vučinić	
Slovenia	RTVSLO	TV SLO 2	Semi-finals	Andrej Hofer	
Slovenia	RTVSLO	TV SLO 1	Final	Andrej Hofer	
Slovenia	RTVSLO	Radio Val 202	SF2/Final	Andrej Hofer	
Slovenia	RTVSLO	Radio Maribor	All shows	Andrej Hofer	
Spain	RTVE	La 2	Semi-finals	José María Íñigo and Julia Varela	
Spain	RTVE	La 1	Final	José María Íñigo and Julia Varela	
Sweden	SVT	SVT1	All shows	Måns Zelmerlöw and Edward af Sillén	
Sweden	SVT	SR P4	All shows	Carolina Norén, Björn Kjellman and Ola Gäverth	
Switzerland	SRG SSR	SRF zwei	Semi-finals	Sven Epiney	
Switzerland	SRG SSR	SRF 1	Final	Sven Epiney	
Switzerland	SRG SSR	RTS Deux	Semi-finals	Jean-Marc Richard and Nicolas Tanner	
Switzerland	SRG SSR	RTS Un	Final	Jean-Marc Richard and Nicolas Tanner	
Switzerland	SRG SSR	RSI La 2	Semi-finals	Clarissa Tami and Sebalter	
Switzerland	SRG SSR	RSI La 1	Final	Clarissa Tami and Sebalter	
Ukraine	UA:PBC	UA:First	All shows	Tetyana Terekhova and Andriy Horodyskyi	
Ukraine	UA:PBC	Ukrainian Radio	All shows	Olena Zelinchenko and Roman Kolyada	
United Kingdom	BBC	BBC Four	Semi-finals	Scott Mills and Mel Giedroyc	
United Kingdom	BBC	BBC One	Final	Graham Norton	
United Kingdom	BBC	BBC Radio 2	Final	Ken Bruce	

Broadcasters and commentators in non-participating countries
Country/Territory	Broadcaster	Channel(s)	Show(s)	Commentator(s)	Ref(s)
China	HBS	Hunan Television	All shows	Lee Wei Song and Lee Shih Shiong	
Greenland	KNR		Final	Ole Tøpholm	
Kazakhstan	Khabar	Khabar TV	All shows	Diana Snegina and Kaldybek Zhaysanbay	
Kosovo	RTK	RTK 1	All shows	Alma Bektashi and Agron Krasniqi	
Slovakia	RTVS	Rádio FM	Final	Daniel Baláž, Pavol Hubinák and Juraj Malíček	
United States	Viacom	Logo TV	Final	Michelle Visage and Ross Mathews	

== Incidents and controversies ==
=== Russian withdrawal ===
Channel One Russia (C1R) announced on 12 March 2017 that it would participate at the contest with "Flame Is Burning", performed by Julia Samoylova. However, Samoylova was issued a three-year travel ban on entering Ukraine by the Security Service of Ukraine (SBU) on 22 March, by virtue of illegally travelling directly from Russia to Crimea, a region that was annexed by Russia in 2014, in 2015 to give a performance. Entry to Crimea by non-Ukrainian citizens via Russia is illegal under Ukrainian law; however, Samoylova confirmed that she performed in Crimea in 2015.

The EBU responded by stating its commitment to ensuring that all participating countries would be able to perform in Kyiv, while expressing its disappointment at the lack of compromise from C1R and UA:PBC. C1R was offered the opportunity to allow Samoylova to perform via satellite from a venue of its choice, but such a compromise was rejected by both C1R and the Ukrainian government.

The director-general of the EBU, Ingrid Deltenre, condemned Ukraine's actions, describing them as "abusing the contest for political reasons" and "absolutely unacceptable". C1R announced its withdrawal from the contest on 13 April, stating that they also might not broadcast the contest. C1R had not organised accommodation before the artist announcement, as is typically the case, and refused to attend the meeting of heads of delegation. By announcing its artist just before the deadline for entry submission to the contest and not booking a hotel, it was speculated that C1R had not intended to compete in Kyiv due to audiences booing Russian artists in previous contests.

As part of the Russian Victory Day celebrations on 9 May, Samoylova gave another performance in Crimea, including "Flame Is Burning", the song which was intended to represent Russia in the contest.

Because the official album of the contest had been produced before the withdrawal, the planned Russian entry, "Flame Is Burning", remained on both digital and physical copies of the album.

=== Israeli broadcaster compromise ===
Under a proposal by Israeli prime minister Benjamin Netanyahu and then-finance minister Moshe Kahlon in April 2017, the Israel Broadcasting Authority (IBA) would be reorganised into two separate entities: the Israeli Public Broadcasting Corporation (IPBC), with responsibility for "general programming" such as entertainment, and another with responsibility for news and current affairs programming. The IPBC is also branded as Kan (Hebrew: כאן, lit. 'Here'). The EBU informed Kan's executive board on 7 April that such a compromise would render it ineligible for EBU membership without an outlet for news and current events programming. It was then reported that the IBA may cease to be a member of the EBU.

The IBA was expected to close down on 15 May 2017, before Kan was expected to launch. However, on 9 and 10 May, the IBA abruptly shut down most of its operations in news and current affair programs. The 2017 contest was the last program that Channel 1 aired under the IBA, where a skeleton staff of 20 people remained to ensure a smooth transmission of the shows. After the contest ended, the IBA displayed a slide about its closure. During the jury voting segment of the final, Ofer Nachshon, the Israeli voting spokesperson since 2009, bid farewell on behalf of the IBA before revealing its jury points. This was incorrectly reported by several international media outlets as Israel leaving the contest. Kan applied for EBU membership later that year, and signed an agreement with the EBU to allow it to participate in Eurovision events pending full membership, thus permitting Israel's presence in the 2018 contest, which it went on to win.

=== Argument for using pre-recorded vocals live ===
The Norwegian broadcaster NRK discussed with the EBU the possibility of abolishing the rule prohibiting pre-recorded vocals. The rule is intended to guarantee authenticity of live performances. The discussion stemmed from when its representative Jowst stated his displeasure at the rule on 24 March, in reference to the sampling technique of chopped vocals in his song "Grab the Moment" which cannot be replicated in a live performance.

Such discussions were also in place in 1999, when pre-recorded vocals during the Croatian entry, "Marija Magdalena" performed by Doris Dragović, led to objections by Norway — led at the time by future executive supervisor Jon Ola Sand. Such objections led the EBU to deduct a third of Croatia's final score, reducing it from 118 points to 79, for the purposes of admission to future finals. The possible abolition of the rule, alongside the abolition of the live orchestra in 1999, led some fans and critics of the contest to argue that the contest became too commercialised and the authenticity of live performances compromised.

After discussing the matter with the EBU, NRK was granted an exception to the rule. Jowst stated that "[the Norwegian delegation] have now been allowed to use the recorded vocal tracks, [...]. But [they] have also practiced a plan B with the backing vocalists, if there are big protests from others in Kyiv." Both Jowst and Aleksander Walmann think that had "Grab the Moment" been in the semi-final of the 2018 contest following an abolition of the rule, they would have had an advantage. NRK stated on 2 May that Jowst was aiming to perform the song acoustically as a back-up, by bringing two additional backing vocalists who would perform the pre-recorded vocals live using a filter applied by the sound engineering team so as not to compromise on sound quality.

=== Norwegian jury replacement ===
Norwegian jury member Per Sundnes made comments on NRK preview show Adresse Kiev on 17 April 2017 against Irish representative Brendan Murray, saying: "It's been a long time since they've gotten up and I do not think they'll do it again. They try the same formula year after year." The comments were not welcomed by the Irish delegation, who subsequently reported the matter to the EBU. The Irish Independent reported on 8 May that Sundnes had been replaced due to an alleged breach in jury rules. Commenting on the decision, the Irish head of delegation, Michael Kealy, said: "I'm glad that the European Broadcasting Union have reacted swiftly to this situation and that all jury members are impartial. It's only fair that each song in the Eurovision Song Contest is judged on its individual merits on the night." Sundnes was subsequently replaced by Erland Bakke.

Sundnes stated in an interview with VG on 9 May: "I do not know anything about the jury stuff, just that I'm not [in it]. It was not really surprising. The same thing happened in Sweden last year with the Swedish professional jury." NRK admits it made a mistake by letting Sundnes sit in both the professional jury and the judging panel of Adresse Kiev. However, when the broadcaster was informed by the EBU that this was against the rules, it rectified the situation quickly. Project manager for Melodi Grand Prix and the Norwegian head of delegation, Stig Karlsen, stated: "We have received some concerns from several teams that Per has been in the jury, while at the same time he has been meaningful in the program. Therefore, we took a new assessment."

=== Estonian technical issues ===
On 11 May 2017, during the broadcast of the second semi-final, the microphones of the Estonian representatives appeared to have malfunctioned as singer Laura Põldvere could not be heard for approximately two seconds by viewers at home. It was later revealed that the Estonian delegation considered appealing to the EBU to allow Põldvere and Koit Toome to perform their entry "Verona" again as a result of the error, but later decided against it. Mart Normet, the Estonian head of delegation, explained, "If there has been such a powerful performance for three minutes and given an absolute maximum, then this energy again does not come back when you go on stage again". The EBU responded to the situation, reportedly describing the error as purely technical, as the microphone was supposed to automatically come on. Instead, a sound technician was forced to respond by manually switching on the microphone via the sound desk. The entry ultimately failed to qualify for the final, with Põldvere expressing her annoyance, though she stated, "I do not think it's so tremendously influenced when a few words remain unheard".

=== Salvador Sobral's political message ===
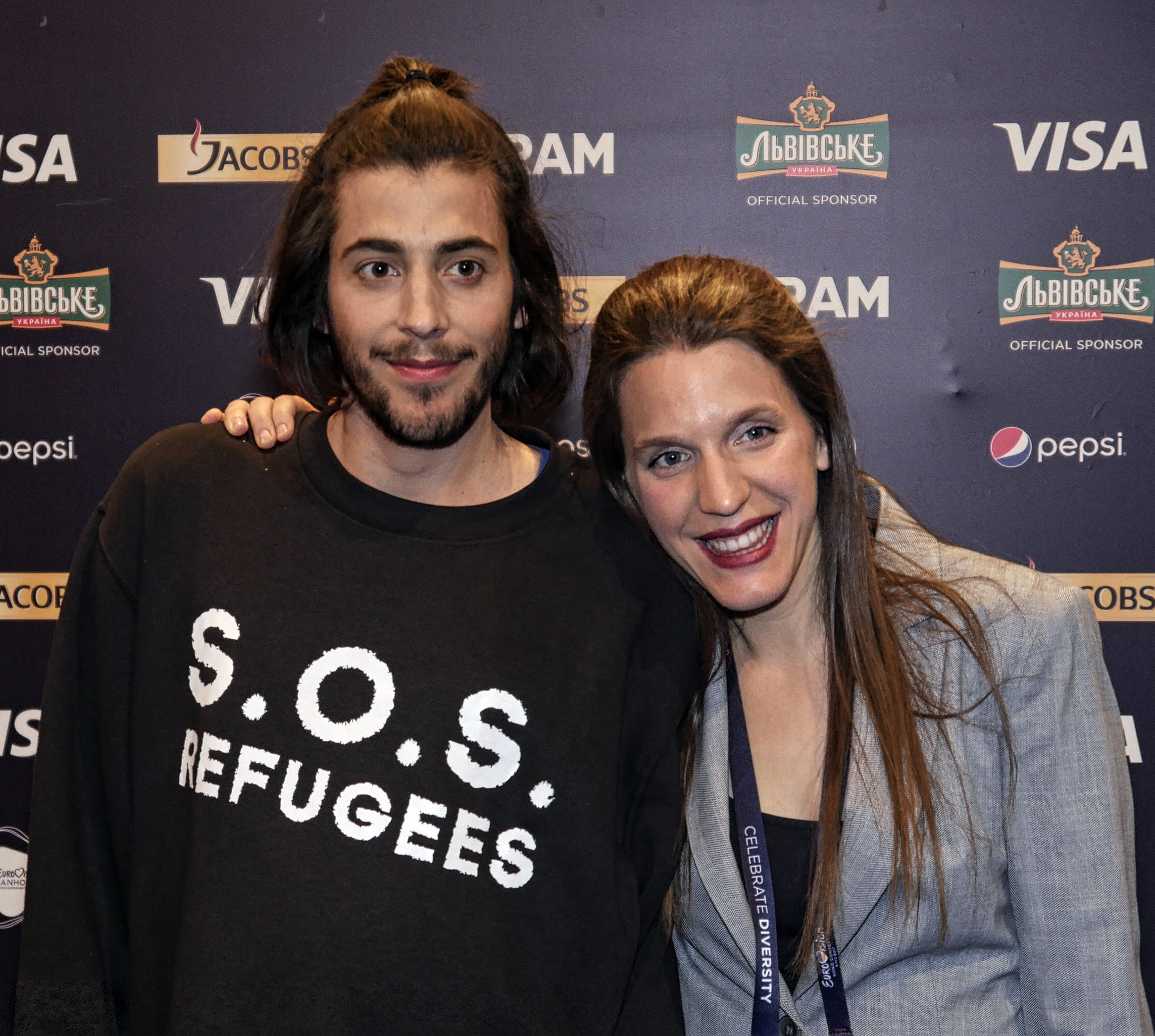
Salvador and Luísa Sobral at the first semi-final winners' press conference

The Portuguese representative Salvador Sobral drew attention to the European migrant crisis by turning up to the first semi-final winners' press conference in an "S.O.S. Refugees" shirt. "If I'm here and I have European exposure, the least thing I can do is a humanitarian message", Sobral stated. "People come to Europe in plastic boats and are being asked to show their birth certificates in order to enter a country. These people are not immigrants, they're refugees running from death. Make no mistake. There is so much bureaucratic stuff happening in the refugee camps in Greece, Turkey and Italy and we should help create legal and safe pathways from these countries to their destiny countries", he added, earning a round of applause. Later on, the EBU ordered a ban so that he could not wear it for the remainder of the contest. The EBU explained that Sobral's jumper was used as a means of "political message," which violates the rules of the contest. However, Sobral argued in his winning press conference that it was not political, but a message of humanitarianism.

=== Jamala stage invasion ===
Jamala's performance of her song "I Believe in U" during the interval of the final was disrupted by a man draped in an Australian flag who invaded the stage and briefly mooned the audience before being removed by security. He was later identified as Ukrainian prankster Vitalii Sediuk. In their response to the incident, the EBU stated the following: "A person took to the stage at the beginning of Jamala's performance of 'I Believe in U' at tonight's Eurovision Song Contest in Kyiv. He was quickly removed from the stage by security and out of the arena. He is currently being held and questioned by the police at the venue police office."

== Other awards ==
In addition to the main winner's trophy, the Marcel Bezençon Awards and the Barbara Dex Award were contested during the 2017 Eurovision Song Contest. The OGAE, "General Organisation of Eurovision Fans" voting poll also took place before the contest.

=== Marcel Bezençon Awards ===
The Marcel Bezençon Awards, organised since 2002 by Sweden's then-Head of Delegation and 1992 representative Christer Björkman, and 1984 winner Richard Herrey, honours songs in the contest's final. The awards are divided into three categories: Artistic Award, Composers Award, and Press Award. The winners were revealed shortly before the final on 13 May.

Category	Country	Song	Artist	Songwriter(s)
Artistic Award	Portugal	"Amar pelos dois"	Salvador Sobral	Luísa Sobral
Composers Award	Portugal	"Amar pelos dois"	Salvador Sobral	Luísa Sobral
Press Award	Italy	"Occidentali's Karma"	Francesco Gabbani	Francesco Gabbani; Filippo Gabbani; Fabio Ilacqua; Luca Chiaravalli

=== OGAE ===
OGAE, an organisation of over forty Eurovision Song Contest fan clubs across Europe and beyond, conducts an annual voting poll first held in 2002 as the Marcel Bezençon Fan Award. The 2017 poll ran from 1 to 30 April with a daily-publishing of adding the votes of 44 clubs, and after all votes were cast, the top-ranked entry was Italy's "Occidentali's Karma" performed by Francesco Gabbani; the top five results are shown below.

Country	Song	Artist	Points
Italy	"Occidentali's Karma"	Francesco Gabbani	497
Belgium	"City Lights"	Blanche	335
Sweden	"I Can't Go On"	Robin Bengtsson	308
France	"Requiem"	Alma	277
Estonia	"Verona"	Koit Toome and Laura	242

=== Barbara Dex Award ===
The Barbara Dex Award is a humorous fan award given to the worst dressed artist each year. Named after Belgium's representative who came last in the 1993 contest, wearing her self-designed dress, the award was handed for the first year by the fansite songfestival.be after the fansite House of Eurovision organised it from 1997 to 2016.

Place	Country	Artist
1	Montenegro	Slavko Kalezić
2	Latvia	Triana Park
3	Czech Republic	Martina Bárta
4	Switzerland	Timebelle
5	Albania	Lindita

== Official album ==
Cover art of the official album

Eurovision Song Contest: Kyiv 2017 is the official compilation album of the contest, put together by the European Broadcasting Union and was released by Universal Music Group digitally on 21 April and physically on 28 April 2017. The album features all 42 participating entries, including the semi-finalists that failed to qualify for the final. The album also features the Russian entry which withdrew from the contest on 13 April 2017. This is the second consecutive year that the official album featured a song which had withdrawn before the contest.

=== Charts ===
Chart (2017)	Peak position
Australian Albums (ARIA)	15
Austrian Albums (Ö3 Austria)	3
Danish Albums (Hitlisten)	30
Finnish Albums (Suomen virallinen lista)	37
German Compilation Albums (Offizielle Top 100)	2
Greek Albums (IFPI)	12
Irish Compilation Albums (IRMA)	7
Norwegian Albums (VG-lista)	37
Swiss Albums (Schweizer Hitparade)	2
UK Compilation Albums (Official Charts)	7

== See also ==
- ABU International Dance Festival 2017
- Bala Turkvision Song Contest 2017
- Eurovision Choir of the Year 2017
- Eurovision Young Dancers 2017
- Junior Eurovision Song Contest 2017
- Turkvision Song Contest 2017
