= Azerbaijan in the Eurovision Song Contest 2017 =

- Eurovision Song Contest 2017
- Country: Azerbaijan
- Selection process: Internal selection
- Announcement date: Artist: 5 December 2016; Song: 11 March 2017

Competing entry
- Song: "Skeletons"
- Artist: Dihaj
- Songwriters: Isa Melikov; Sandra Bjurman

Placement
- Semi-final result: Qualified (8th, 150 points)
- Final result: 14th, 120 points

Participation chronology

Azerbaijan was represented at the Eurovision Song Contest 2017 with the song "Skeletons" written by Isa Melikov and Sandra Bjurman. The song was performed by Dihaj, who was internally selected by the Azerbaijani broadcaster İctimai Television (İTV) to represent the nation at the 2017 contest in Kyiv, Ukraine. Dihaj's selection as the Azerbaijani Eurovision entrant was announced on 5 December 2016, while the song "Skeletons" was presented to the public on 11 March 2017.

Azerbaijan was drawn to compete in the first semi-final of the Eurovision Song Contest which took place on 9 May 2017. Performing during the show in position 8, "Skeletons" was announced among the top 10 entries of the first semi-final and therefore qualified to compete in the final on 13 May. It was later revealed that Azerbaijan placed eighth out of the 18 participating countries in the semi-final with 150 points. In the final, Azerbaijan performed in position 12 and placed fourteenth out of the 26 participating countries, scoring 120 points.

== Background ==
Prior to the 2017 contest, Azerbaijan had participated in the Eurovision Song Contest nine times since its first entry in 2008. Azerbaijan had won the contest on one occasion in 2011 with the song "Running Scared" performed by Ell and Nikki. Since their debut in 2008, Azerbaijan has had a string of successful results, qualifying to the final and placing in the top ten each year until 2014, including a third-place result in 2009 with the song "Always" performed by AySel and Arash and a second-place result in 2013 with the song "Hold Me" performed by Farid Mammadov. However, in 2014, Azerbaijan achieved their lowest placing in the contest to this point, placing 22nd in the final with the song "Start a Fire" performed by Dilara Kazimova. In 2016, Azerbaijan placed seventeenth with the song "Miracle" performed by Samra.

The Azerbaijani national broadcaster, İctimai Television (İTV), broadcasts the event within Azerbaijan and organises the selection process for the nation's entry. İTV confirmed their intentions to participate at the 2017 Eurovision Song Contest on 23 September 2016. Azerbaijan had used various methods to select the Azerbaijani entry in the past, including internal selections of both the artist and song, as well as national finals to select their artist followed by an internal selection to determine the song. Between 2011 and 2013, Azerbaijan organized a national final titled Milli Seçim Turu to select the performer, song or both for Eurovision. In 2014, the broadcaster utilised an existing talent show format titled Böyük Səhnə where the winning performer would subsequently be given an internally selected song. Since 2015, the broadcaster internally selected both the artist and song that represented Azerbaijan, a procedure which continued for the selection of their 2017 entry.

== Before Eurovision ==
=== Internal selection ===
Both the artist and song that represented Azerbaijan at the Eurovision Song Contest 2017 was selected internally by İTV. On 5 December 2016, the broadcaster announced that a national jury panel had selected Dihaj as the Azerbaijani Eurovision contestant. On 1 February 2017, interested songwriters were called upon to submit their entries by 10 February 2017. Songwriters could be of any nationality. In regards to the song, Dihaj stated in an interview that she was planning to keep her experimental music style for the contest. On 11 March 2017, İTV announced that Dihaj would be performing the song "Skeletons". "Skeletons" was written by Isa Melikov and Sandra Bjurman, and was presented on the same day via the release of the official music video.

=== Promotion ===
Dihaj specifically promoted "Skeletons" as the Azerbaijani Eurovision entry on 8 April 2017 by performing during the Eurovision in Concert event which was held at the Melkweg venue in Amsterdam, Netherlands and hosted by Cornald Maas and Selma Björnsdóttir.

== At Eurovision ==
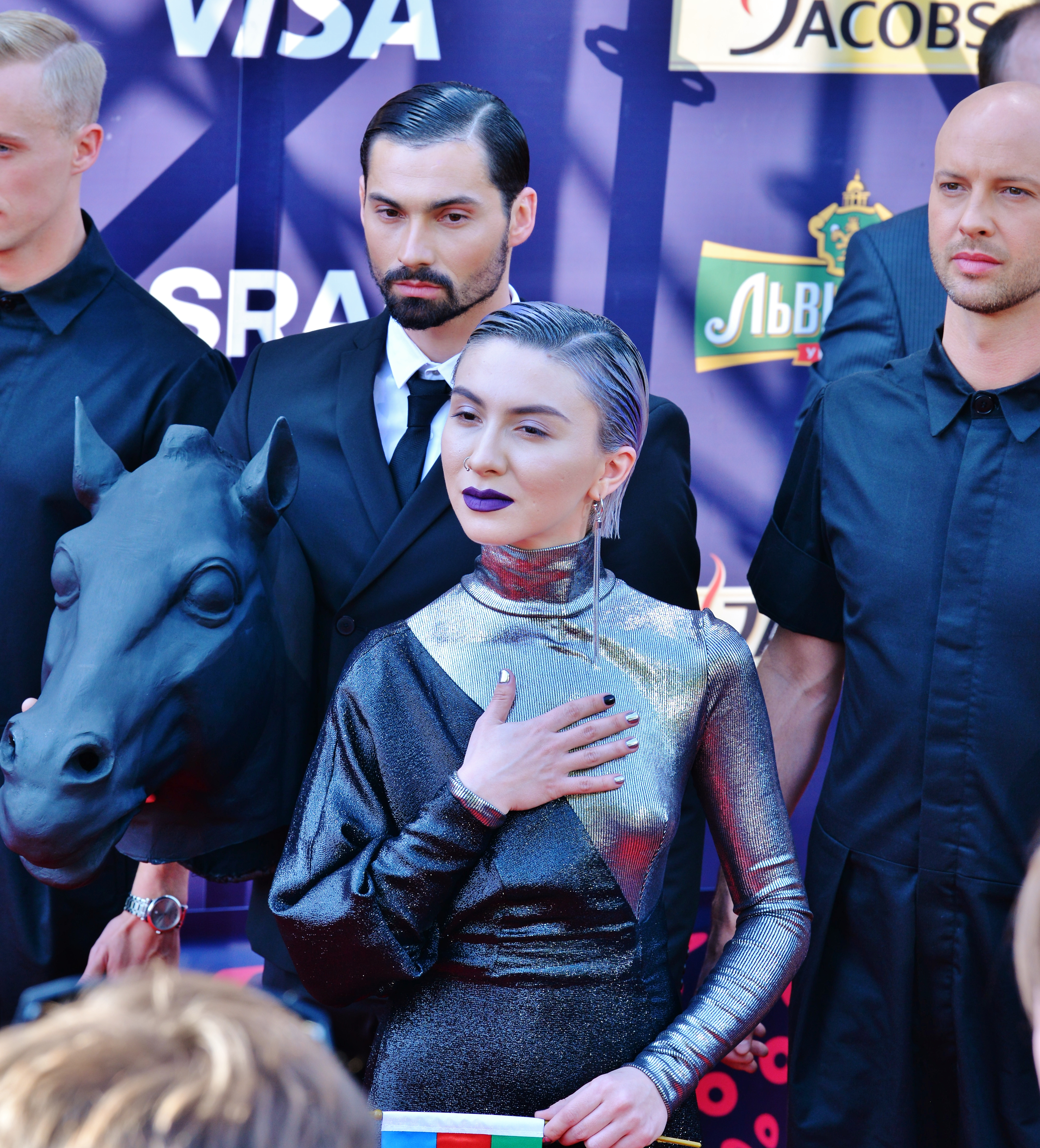
Dihaj at the 2017 Eurovision Red Carpet event

According to Eurovision rules, all nations with the exceptions of the host country and the "Big Five" (France, Germany, Italy, Spain and the United Kingdom) are required to qualify from one of two semi-finals in order to compete for the final; the top ten countries from each semi-final progress to the final. The European Broadcasting Union (EBU) split up the competing countries into six different pots based on voting patterns from previous contests, with countries with favourable voting histories put into the same pot. On 31 January 2017, a special allocation draw was held which placed each country into one of the two semi-finals, as well as which half of the show they would perform in. Azerbaijan was placed into the first semi-final, to be held on 9 May 2017, and was scheduled to perform in the first half of the show.

Once all the competing songs for the 2017 contest had been released, the running order for the semi-finals was decided by the shows' producers rather than through another draw, so that similar songs were not placed next to each other. Azerbaijan was set to perform in position 8, following the entry from Finland and before the entry from Portugal.

The two semi-finals and final were broadcast in Azerbaijan on İTV with commentary by Azer Suleymanli. The Azerbaijani spokesperson, who announced the top 12-point score awarded by the Azerbaijani jury during the final, was Tural Asadov.

=== Semi-final ===
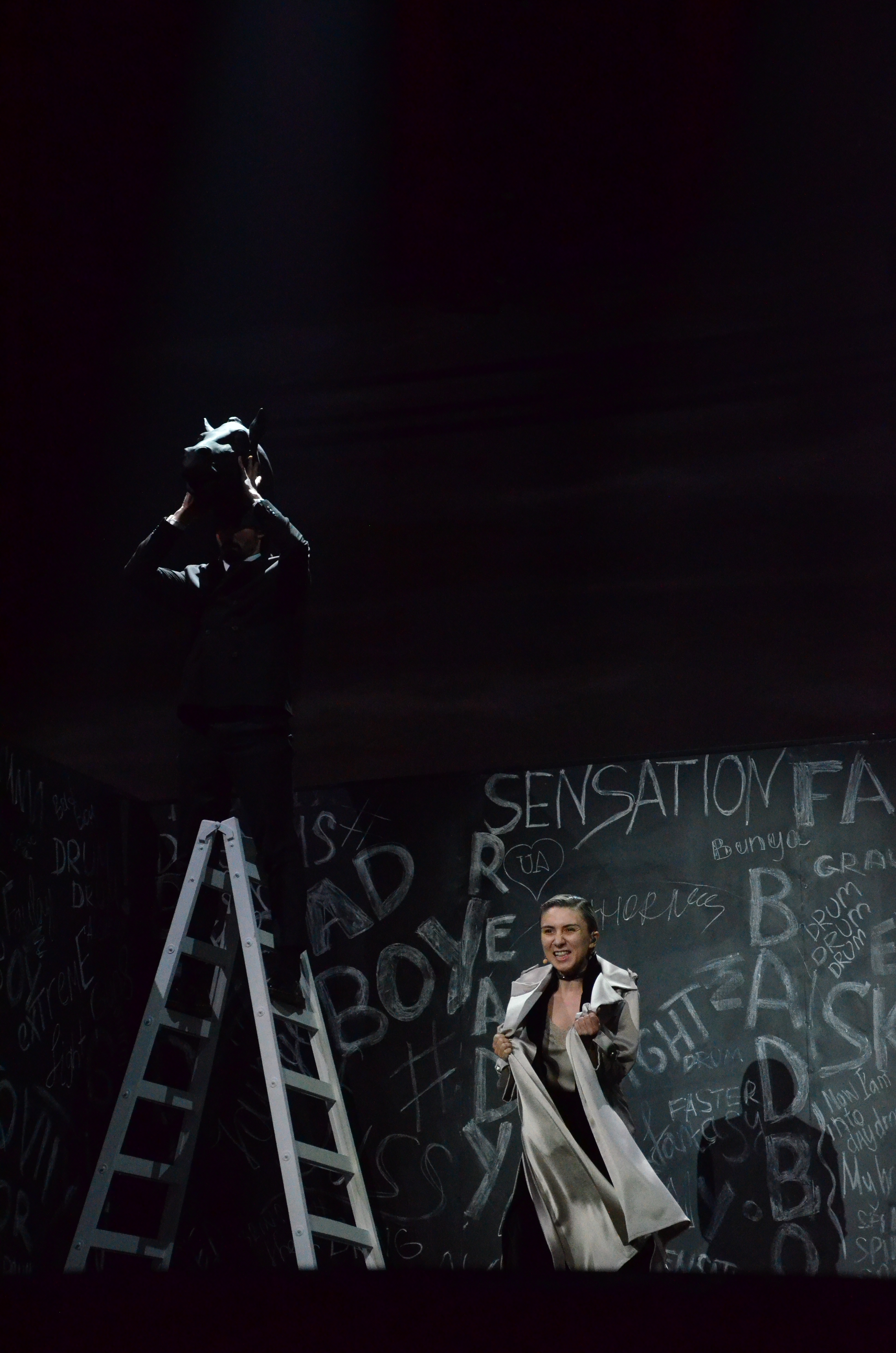
Dihaj during a rehearsal before the first semi-final

Dihaj took part in technical rehearsals on 30 April and 4 May, followed by dress rehearsals on 8 and 9 May. This included the jury show on 8 May where the professional juries of each country watched and voted on the competing entries.

The Azerbaijani performance featured Dihaj dressed in a gold silk overcoat and bodice as well as black pants performing with a male dancer wearing a black suit with a horse head and four backing vocalists. The performance began with Dihaj chalk scrawling words in the corner of a black three-sided box with blackboard walls, while the dancer appeared on a stepladder. After Dihaj climbed the ladder, the backing vocalists dropped the left and right walls of the box with their backs chalk crossed outs by Dihaj. The LED screens transitioned from a red background to a city skyline. In regards to the performance, which was directed by Naila Mammadzada, Dihaj stated: "The box signed with various words depicts my inner world, while the guy with a horse mask sitting on the ladder impersonates a bad boy. The ladder and the mask imply a huge emotional distance between us." Dihaj and the dancer left the box at the end, which symbolised getting over a self-destructive relationship and deciding to put an end to it. The four backing vocalists that joined Dihaj on stage were Jennie Jahns, Johan D. Seil, Kristian Tåje and Marie Nordmark Sjöström, while the dancer was Vitaliy Zagoruiko.

At the end of the show, Azerbaijan was announced as having finished in the top 10 and subsequently qualifying for the grand final. It was later revealed that Azerbaijan placed eighth in the semi-final, receiving a total of 150 points: 63 points from the televoting and 87 points from the juries.

=== Final ===
Shortly after the first semi-final, a winners' press conference was held for the ten qualifying countries. As part of this press conference, the qualifying artists took part in a draw to determine which half of the grand final they would subsequently participate in. This draw was done in the reverse order the countries appeared in the semi-final running order. Azerbaijan was drawn to compete in the first half. Following this draw, the shows' producers decided upon the running order of the final, as they had done for the semi-finals. Azerbaijan was subsequently placed to perform in position 12, following the entry from Portugal and before the entry from Croatia.

Dihaj once again took part in dress rehearsals on 12 and 13 May before the final, including the jury final where the professional juries cast their final votes before the live show. Dihaj performed a repeat of her semi-final performance during the final on 12 May. Azerbaijan placed fourteenth in the final, scoring 120 points: 42 points from the televoting and 78 points from the juries.

=== Voting ===
Voting during the three shows involved each country awarding two sets of points from 1–8, 10 and 12: one from their professional jury and the other from televoting. Each nation's jury consisted of five music industry professionals who are citizens of the country they represent, with their names published before the contest to ensure transparency. This jury judged each entry based on: vocal capacity; the stage performance; the song's composition and originality; and the overall impression by the act. In addition, no member of a national jury was permitted to be related in any way to any of the competing acts in such a way that they cannot vote impartially and independently. The individual rankings of each jury member as well as the nation's televoting results were released shortly after the grand final.

Below is a breakdown of points awarded to Azerbaijan and awarded by Azerbaijan in the first semi-final and grand final of the contest, and the breakdown of the jury voting and televoting conducted during the two shows:

==== Points awarded to Azerbaijan ====
Points awarded to Azerbaijan (Semi-final 1)
| Score | Televote | Jury |
|---|---|---|
| 12 points | Czech Republic; Georgia; Moldova | Italy |
| 10 points | Cyprus | Georgia |
| 8 points | | Greece; Portugal |
| 7 points | Slovenia | Albania; Montenegro |
| 6 points | Montenegro | Iceland |
| 5 points | | Belgium; Spain |
| 4 points | | Cyprus; Czech Republic; Moldova |
| 3 points | | Australia; Slovenia |
| 2 points | Latvia | |
| 1 point | Australia; Portugal | Latvia |

Points awarded to Azerbaijan (Final)
| Score | Televote | Jury |
|---|---|---|
| 12 points | Georgia | Italy; Portugal |
| 10 points | Czech Republic; Moldova | Georgia; Greece |
| 8 points | | |
| 7 points | | |
| 6 points | | Ukraine |
| 5 points | Montenegro | Bulgaria; Moldova; San Marino |
| 4 points | Slovenia | Belgium; Hungary |
| 3 points | | |
| 2 points | | Albania |
| 1 point | San Marino | Cyprus; Ireland; Poland |

==== Points awarded by Azerbaijan ====
Points awarded by Azerbaijan (Semi-final 1)
| Score | Televote | Jury |
|---|---|---|
| 12 points | Georgia | Portugal |
| 10 points | Moldova | Albania |
| 8 points | Portugal | Montenegro |
| 7 points | Belgium | Australia |
| 6 points | Sweden | Georgia |
| 5 points | Montenegro | Moldova |
| 4 points | Latvia | Czech Republic |
| 3 points | Albania | Poland |
| 2 points | Australia | Iceland |
| 1 point | Poland | Latvia |

Points awarded by Azerbaijan (Final)
| Score | Televote | Jury |
|---|---|---|
| 12 points | Bulgaria | Belarus |
| 10 points | Moldova | Moldova |
| 8 points | Portugal | Portugal |
| 7 points | Hungary | Ukraine |
| 6 points | Italy | Poland |
| 5 points | France | Greece |
| 4 points | Belgium | Israel |
| 3 points | Sweden | Romania |
| 2 points | Romania | Bulgaria |
| 1 point | Israel | Croatia |

==== Detailed voting results ====
The following members comprised the Azerbaijani jury:

- Aleksandr Sharovskiy (jury chairperson) – theatre director
- Afaq Melikova – artistic director
- Anvar Sadigov – accordionist, arranger
- Sevda Alakbarzadeh – pop and jazz singer (jury member in semi-final 1)
- Anar Huseynli – vocalist, musician
- Emil Mammadov – jazzman, jazz pianist (jury member in the final)

Detailed voting results from Azerbaijan (Semi-final 1)
| R/O | Country | Jury | | | | | | | Televote | |
| R/O | Country | A. Sharovskiy | A. Melikova | A. Sadigov | S. Alakbarzadeh | A. Huseynli | Rank | Points | Rank | Points |
|---|---|---|---|---|---|---|---|---|---|---|
| 01 | Sweden | 13 | 13 | 13 | 12 | 13 | 13 | | 5 | 6 |
| 02 | Georgia | 6 | 3 | 5 | 5 | 6 | 5 | 6 | 1 | 12 |
| 03 | Australia | 4 | 4 | 2 | 3 | 5 | 4 | 7 | 9 | 2 |
| 04 | Albania | 1 | 2 | 3 | 4 | 2 | 2 | 10 | 8 | 3 |
| 05 | Belgium | 15 | 15 | 14 | 14 | 14 | 14 | | 4 | 7 |
| 06 | Montenegro | 3 | 5 | 4 | 2 | 3 | 3 | 8 | 6 | 5 |
| 07 | Finland | 11 | 10 | 10 | 11 | 11 | 11 | | 16 | |
| 08 | Azerbaijan | | | | | | | | | |
| 09 | Portugal | 2 | 1 | 1 | 1 | 1 | 1 | 12 | 3 | 8 |
| 10 | Greece | 14 | 14 | 15 | 15 | 15 | 15 | | 13 | |
| 11 | Poland | 9 | 9 | 8 | 8 | 4 | 8 | 3 | 10 | 1 |
| 12 | Moldova | 5 | 6 | 7 | 7 | 8 | 6 | 5 | 2 | 10 |
| 13 | Iceland | 8 | 8 | 9 | 10 | 7 | 9 | 2 | 12 | |
| 14 | Czech Republic | 7 | 7 | 6 | 6 | 9 | 7 | 4 | 14 | |
| 15 | Cyprus | 16 | 16 | 16 | 16 | 16 | 16 | | 11 | |
| 16 | Armenia | 17 | 17 | 17 | 17 | 17 | 17 | | 17 | |
| 17 | Slovenia | 12 | 12 | 12 | 13 | 12 | 12 | | 15 | |
| 18 | Latvia | 10 | 11 | 11 | 9 | 10 | 10 | 1 | 7 | 4 |

Detailed voting results from Azerbaijan (Final)
| R/O | Country | Jury | | | | | | | Televote | |
| R/O | Country | A. Sharovskiy | A. Melikova | A. Sadigov | A. Huseynli | E. Mammadov | Rank | Points | Rank | Points |
|---|---|---|---|---|---|---|---|---|---|---|
| 01 | Israel | 7 | 6 | 10 | 24 | 6 | 7 | 4 | 10 | 1 |
| 02 | Poland | 4 | 4 | 4 | 23 | 4 | 5 | 6 | 21 | |
| 03 | Belarus | 1 | 1 | 1 | 1 | 2 | 1 | 12 | 11 | |
| 04 | Austria | 15 | 9 | 18 | 20 | 13 | 17 | | 22 | |
| 05 | Armenia | 25 | 25 | 25 | 25 | 25 | 25 | | 25 | |
| 06 | Netherlands | 20 | 12 | 21 | 21 | 3 | 18 | | 19 | |
| 07 | Moldova | 5 | 2 | 3 | 3 | 5 | 2 | 10 | 2 | 10 |
| 08 | Hungary | 3 | 13 | 9 | 19 | 22 | 12 | | 4 | 7 |
| 09 | Italy | 14 | 3 | 15 | 18 | 19 | 13 | | 5 | 6 |
| 10 | Denmark | 23 | 14 | 22 | 5 | 18 | 20 | | 20 | |
| 11 | Portugal | 6 | 8 | 5 | 4 | 1 | 3 | 8 | 3 | 8 |
| 12 | Azerbaijan | | | | | | | | | |
| 13 | Croatia | 8 | 15 | 7 | 17 | 14 | 10 | 1 | 18 | |
| 14 | Australia | 17 | 16 | 12 | 16 | 10 | 14 | | 16 | |
| 15 | Greece | 9 | 7 | 8 | 15 | 7 | 6 | 5 | 15 | |
| 16 | Spain | 10 | 10 | 13 | 9 | 21 | 11 | | 24 | |
| 17 | Norway | 19 | 17 | 23 | 22 | 20 | 23 | | 13 | |
| 18 | United Kingdom | 11 | 18 | 19 | 14 | 12 | 15 | | 17 | |
| 19 | Cyprus | 24 | 19 | 24 | 13 | 24 | 24 | | 14 | |
| 20 | Romania | 12 | 21 | 6 | 10 | 8 | 8 | 3 | 9 | 2 |
| 21 | Germany | 16 | 22 | 14 | 11 | 17 | 19 | | 23 | |
| 22 | Ukraine | 2 | 5 | 2 | 7 | 16 | 4 | 7 | 12 | |
| 23 | Belgium | 18 | 23 | 17 | 6 | 11 | 16 | | 7 | 4 |
| 24 | Sweden | 22 | 24 | 20 | 2 | 15 | 22 | | 8 | 3 |
| 25 | Bulgaria | 13 | 20 | 11 | 8 | 9 | 9 | 2 | 1 | 12 |
| 26 | France | 21 | 11 | 16 | 12 | 23 | 21 | | 6 | 5 |
