= Skeletons (Dihaj song) =

2017 song by Dihaj

Single by Dihaj
- Released: 15 March 2017
- Length: 2:59
- Label: CAP-Sounds
- Songwriter(s): Isa Melikov; Sandra Bjurman

Dihaj singles chronology
"Eşqini aşagı sal" (2016)	"Skeletons" (2017)

Eurovision Song Contest 2017 entry
- Country: Azerbaijan
- Artist(s): Dihaj
- Language: English
- Composer(s): Isa Melikov
- Lyricist(s): Sandra Bjurman

Finals performance
- Semi-final result: 8th
- Semi-final points: 150
- Final result: 14th
- Final points: 120

Entry chronology
- ◄ "Miracle" (2016)
- "X My Heart" (2018) ►

"Skeletons" is a song performed by Azerbaijani band Dihaj. The song represented Azerbaijan in the Eurovision Song Contest 2017. The song was revealed to the public on 11 March 2017, and was released as a digital download on 15 March. The song is composed by Isa Melikov and Sandra Bjurman, who composed the country's 2011 winning entry "Running Scared".

== Eurovision Song Contest ==
Dihaj was confirmed to be the Azerbaijani representative to the Eurovision Song Contest 2017 on 5 December 2016. The music video to her entry, "Skeletons", was later revealed on 11 March 2017. Azerbaijan competed in the first half of the first semi-final at the Eurovision Song Contest in which she qualified to the final. She was 12th in the running order of the grand final and finished in 14th place including 42 points from televote (11th place) and 78 points from the juries (12th place).

== Track listing ==
Digital download
No.	Title	Length
1.	"Skeletons"	2:59
2.	"Skeletons" (Karaoke Version)	2:59

== Charts ==
Chart performance for "Skeletons"
Chart (2017)	Peak position
Sweden Heatseeker (Sverigetopplistan)	20

== Release history ==
Region	Date	Format	Label
Various	15 March 2017	Digital download	CAP-Sounds
