= Diana Hajiyeva =

Azerbaijani singer-songwriter (born 1989)

Diana Hajiyeva Diana Hacıyeva
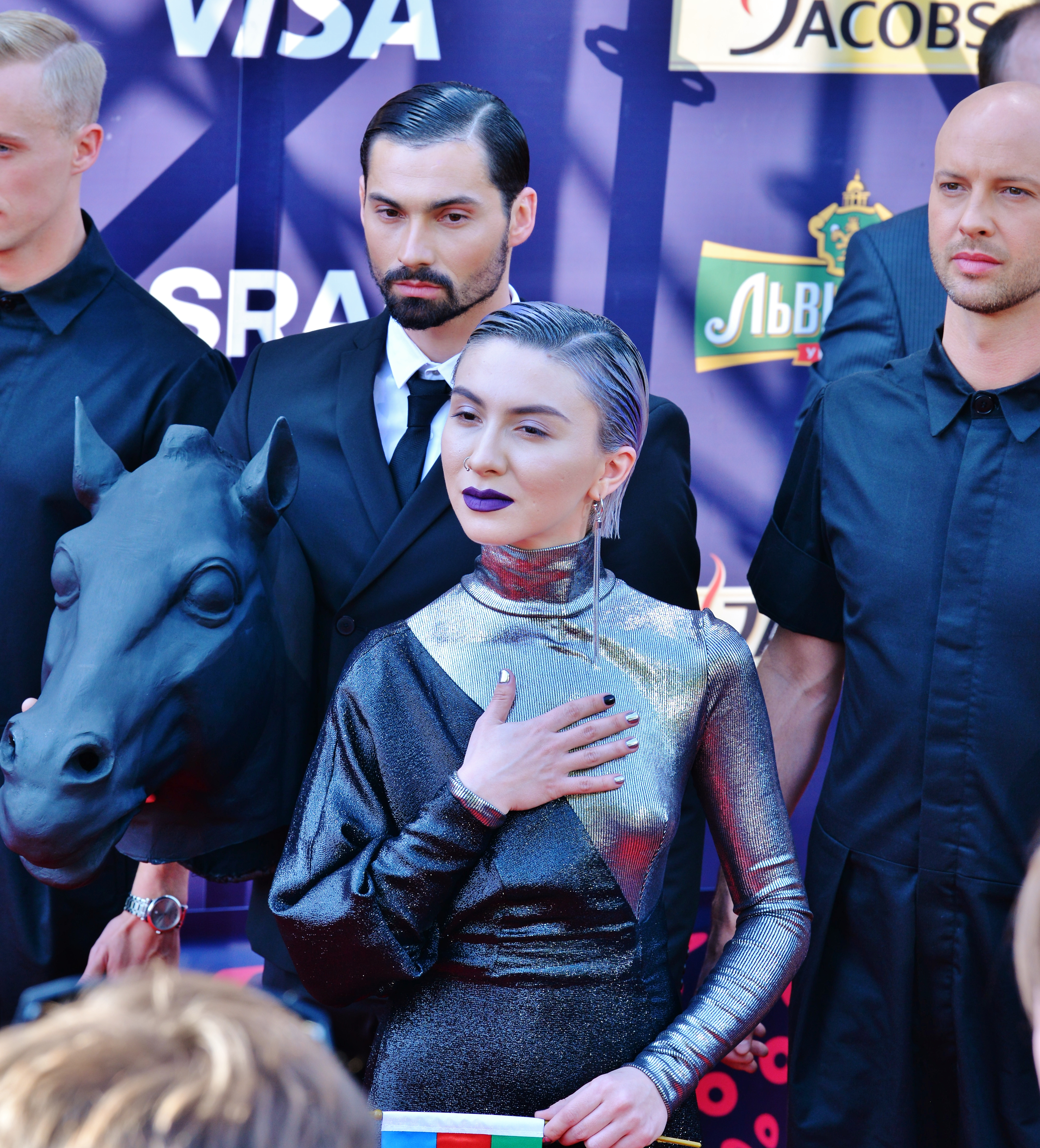
- Hajiyeva in Kyiv in 2017

Background information
- Born: 13 June 1989 (age 37); Mariupol, Ukrainian SSR (now Ukraine)
- Origin: Baku, Azerbaijan
- Genres: Indie pop; electronic; dark wave
- Occupations: Singer; songwriter
- Instrument: Vocals
- Years active: 2006–present

Diana Hajiyeva (Azerbaijani: Diana Hacıyeva, Ukrainian: Діана Гаджиєва, Russian: Диана Гаджиева; born 13 June 1989) is an Azerbaijani singer and songwriter. She is a member and the lead vocalist of the group Dihaj, which represented Azerbaijan in the Eurovision Song Contest 2017 with the song "Skeletons" finishing in 14th place.

== Biography ==
Hajiyeva was born in Mariupol, Ukrainian SSR. Since her childhood she was engaged in music, took piano lessons and was interested in jazz. She was a member of the musical collective "Bery Bach".

She graduated from Baku Academy of Music. Here she received the education of a choral conductor. During the years of studying at the academy, she was engaged in jazz at a professional level. Currently she works at the Baku Jazz Center.

She lived in London, England, where she graduated from The Institute of Contemporary Music Performance.

In 2011, Diana Hajiyeva released her debut music video, "Find Yourself".

In 2014 she launched her personal trio group called Dihaj – from the first letters of her first and last name.The band's music is electronic.

She married Ali Nasirov, a member of Dihaj, in 2009. Together, they have a daughter named Savi.

== Eurovision Song Contest ==
She previously attempted to represent Azerbaijan in the Eurovision Song Contest 2011. Having advanced through qualification, Diana was one of 77 competitors to reach the semifinals, where she performed sixth. She placed fourth in her group, falling 7 points short of qualification for the final.

In 2017, she performed the song "Skeletons". She finished in 14th place out of the 26 countries in the final, with a total of 120 points.

== Career ==
In April 2022, Hajiyeva and pianist Afgan Rasul represented Azerbaijan in the Jazzahead 2022 festival in Germany.

== Discography ==
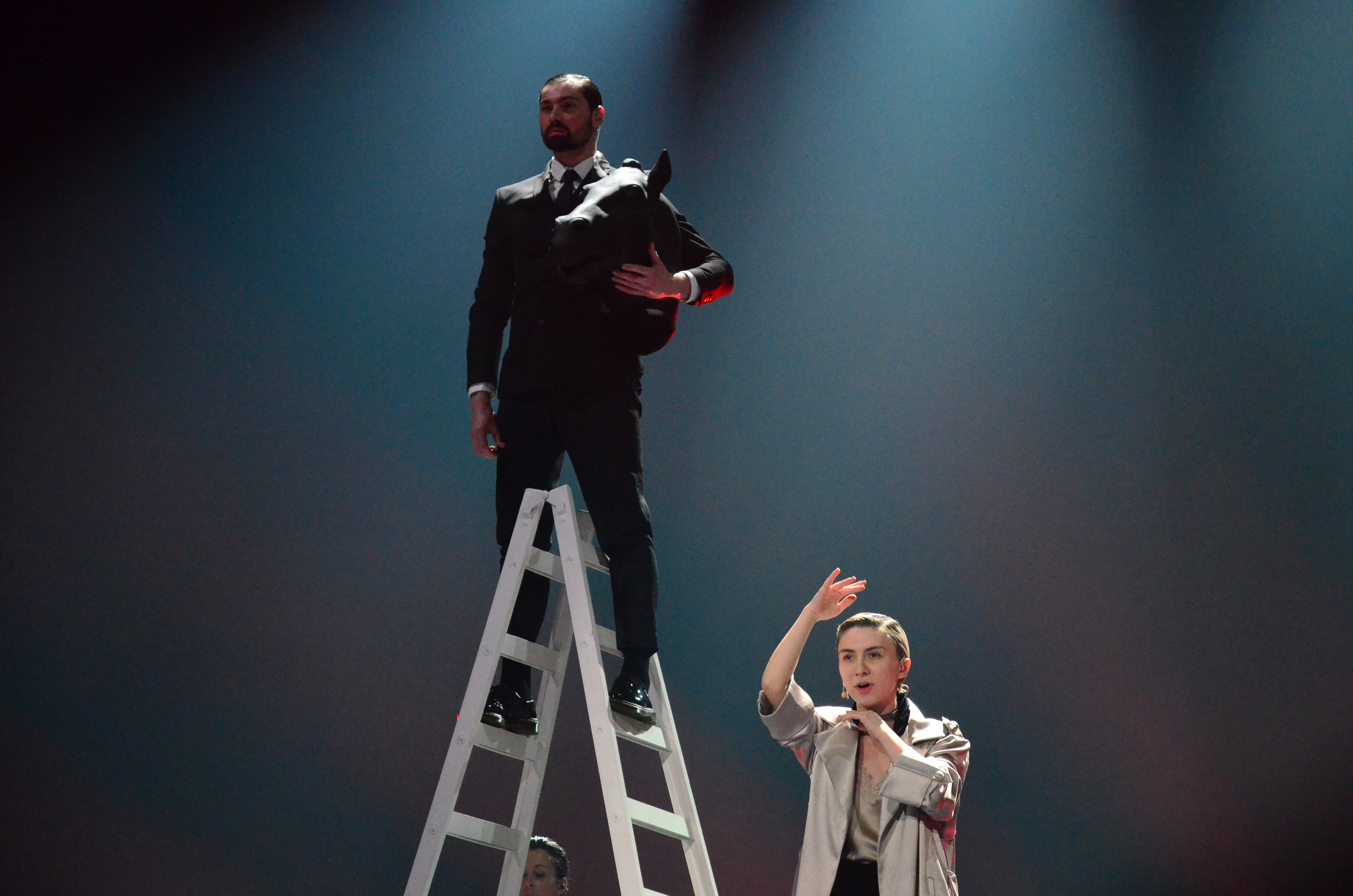
Dihaj during Eurovision Song Contest 2017

=== Singles ===
| Title | Year | Peak chart positions | Album |
| Title | Year | SWE Heat | Album |
|---|---|---|---|
| "I Break Again" | 2014 | — | Non-album singles |
| "Gecələr keçir" | 2015 | — | Non-album singles |
| "Complain" | 2016 | — | Non-album singles |
| "Eşqini aşagı sal" | 2016 | — | Non-album singles |
| "Skeletons" | 2017 | 20 | Non-album singles |
"—" denotes a recording that did not chart or was not released in that territory.

Awards and achievements
| Preceded by Samra with "Miracle" | Azerbaijan in the Eurovision Song Contest; 2017 | Succeeded by Aisel with "X My Heart" |
