= Cesár Sampson =

Austrian singer-songwriter, dancer, model, and producer (born 1983)

- Sampson in 2026
- Born: 18 August 1983 (age 43); Linz, Austria
- Occupations: Singer; songwriter; model
- Relatives: Helen DeMacque (aunt)
- Musical career
- Genres: Pop; R&B; blues; country; electronic
- Instrument: Vocals
- Years active: 2000–present
- Label: Symphonix Music

Cesár Sampson (born 18 August 1983) is an Austrian singer, songwriter, producer, dancer and model. He was also a social worker and fitness coach. He represented Austria in the Eurovision Song Contest 2018 with the song "Nobody but You", winning the jury vote, coming in 13th place in the televote and finishing in third place overall.

== Life and career ==
At the age of seventeen, he started touring locally and internationally. He was a backing singer on the Austrian version of Dancing With the Stars.

=== Music production ===
==== Symphonix ====
In the music production domain, he is part of the music formation Symphonix or Symphonix International, a musical production and events project, mostly active in Austria, Bulgaria and the United Kingdom. Borislav "Boby" Milanov is the CEO with the other members being Johan Alkenäs, Joacim Persson and Cesár Sampson himself. Symphonix has been involved in the launching of a number of songs particularly for the Eurovision Song Contest including "Dance Alone" by Macedonian singer Jana Burčeska, "Bones" by Bulgarian band Equinox, "Beautiful Mess" by Bulgarian singer Kristian Kostov and Cesár Sampson's own entry for Austria "Nobody but You".

Sampson also worked with the formation Electric Church.

=== Eurovision Song Contest ===
==== 2016 and 2017 ====
Sampson performed backing vocals for the Bulgarian acts for two consecutive years in the Eurovision Song Contest. In Eurovision 2016, he was backing Poli Genova in "If Love Was a Crime". The song finished 4th place overall. And in Eurovision 2017, he was Kristian Kostov's vocal coach and support vocalist for his performance of "Beautiful Mess". The song finished second overall behind the winning song from Portugal and gave Bulgaria its best result at Eurovision.

==== 2018 ====
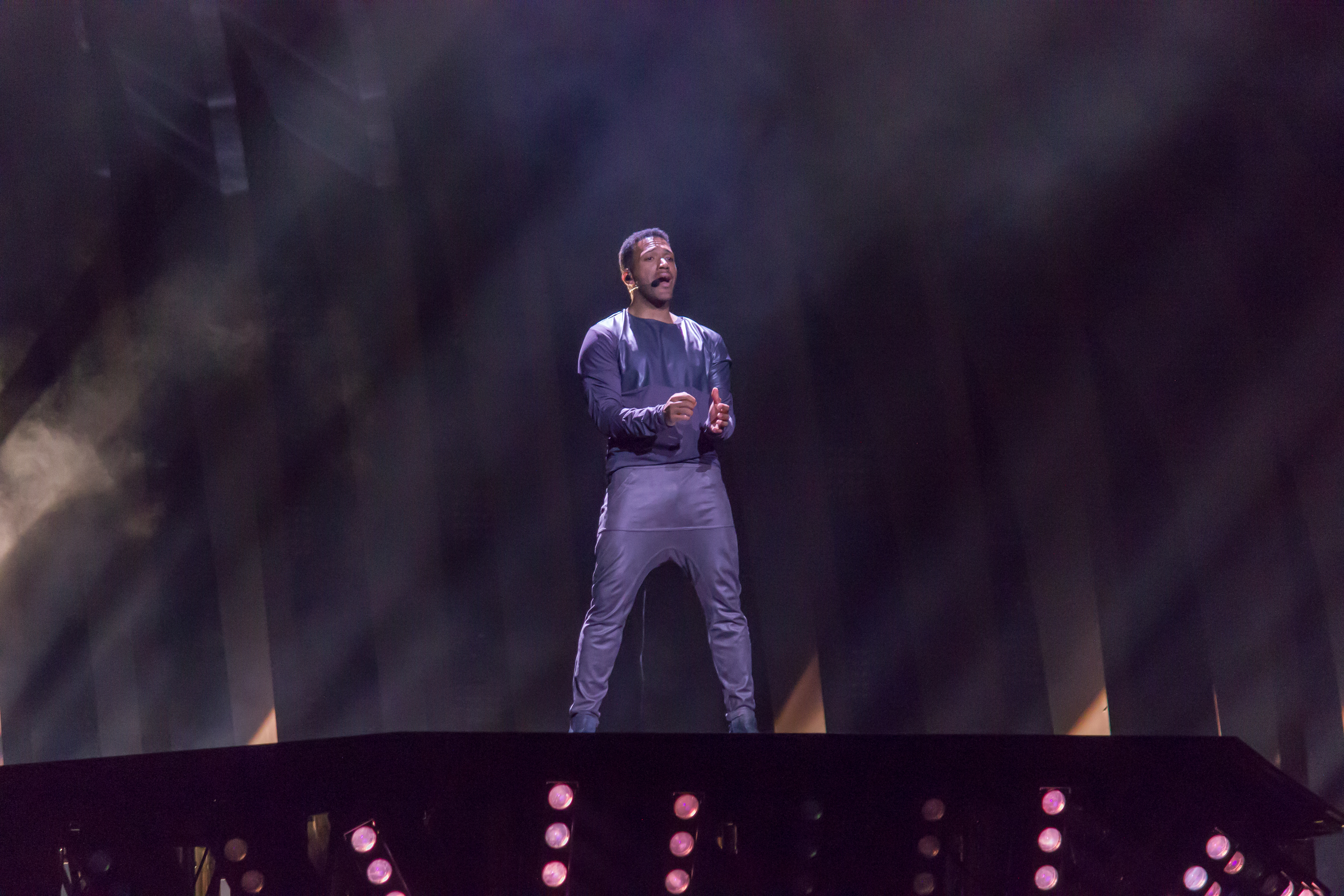
Cesár Sampson at the ESC 2018

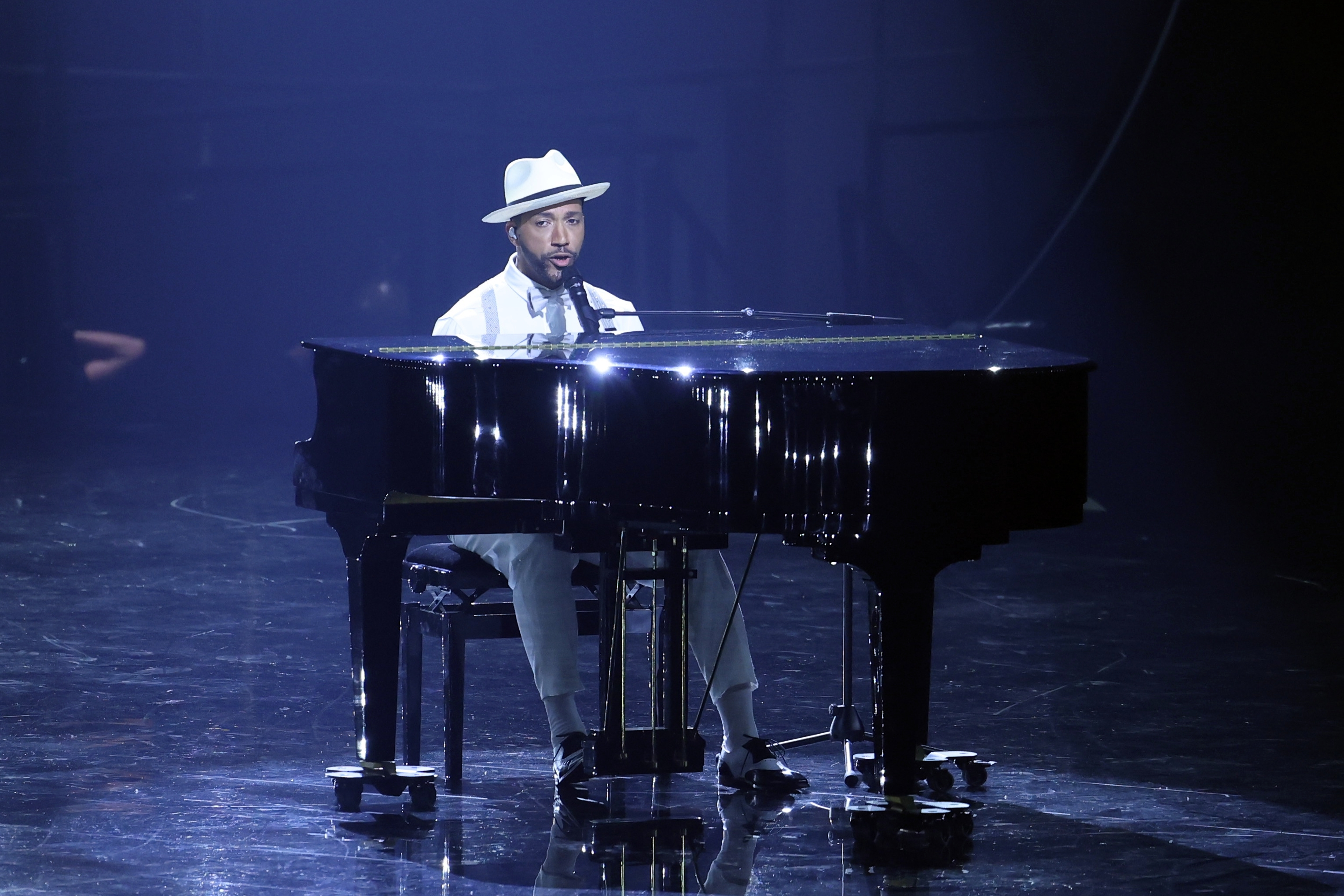
Cesár Sampson as guest artist at the ESC 2026

On 5 December 2017, he was announced as the Austrian representative in the Eurovision Song Contest 2018. He sang "Nobody but You". The song is composed by Sampson himself as well as Boris Milanov and Sebastian Arman, who have been involved in the composition of a number of songs for Bulgaria. He went on to win the jury vote with 271 points, but finished third overall, after taking into account the televoting where he ranked 13th with 71 points, thus preserving him the third overall position, with the public vote favouring Israel as the winner and Cyprus as the runner-up. This was the third highest ranking of all Austrian entries after its three Eurovision winning songs: in Eurovision 1966 with "Merci, Chérie" by Udo Jürgens, in Eurovision 2014 with "Rise like a Phoenix" by Conchita Wurst and in Eurovision 2025 with "Wasted Love" by JJ. Later that year, he appeared as a guest star in the Christmas edition of the Spanish TV program Operación Triunfo.

== Personal life ==
Sampson was born in Linz, Austria. His father is a choreographer and pilates master teacher of Saint Lucian origin, who introduced pilates in the German-speaking countries. Sampson himself became a personal trainer and strength and mobility coach in pilates. His mother was a pianist, singer and songwriter most famous for co-writing and performing the theme song of the popular Austrian TV series Inspector Rex (German: Kommissar Rex). Sampson is also the nephew of Helen "Pepsi" DeMacque from the 1980s duo Pepsi & Shirlie. He also sang as a lead vocalist for Mike Oldfield.

Sampson worked for many years as a social worker. He studied sports sciences getting a diploma and starting at age 20, he worked for several years as a physical therapist, and in particular, worked with people with disabilities and handicaps. Sampson has done modeling, and is signed to a Slovak model agency.

== Discography ==
=== Singles ===
List of singles, showing year released and album name
Title	Year	Peak chart positions									Album
Title	Year	AUT	BEL (FL) Tip	FRA	GER	SCO	SPA	SWE	SWI	UK Down.	Album
"Nobody but You"	2018	1	9	97	93	63	80	55	45	62	Non-album singles
"Stone Cold"	2019	—	—	—	—	—	—	—	—	—	Non-album singles
"Where You Are"	2019	—	—	—	—	—	—	—	—	—	Non-album singles
"Lazy Suit"	2020	—	—	—	—	—	—	—	—	—	Non-album singles

=== Guest appearances ===
List of non-single guest appearances, with other performing artists, showing year released and album name
Title	Year	Other artist(s)	Album
"Sign"	2007	Trishes, Piakhan	Sign / New Wave

Preceded by Nathan Trent with "Running on Air"	Austria in the Eurovision Song Contest; 2018	Succeeded by Paenda with "Limits"
