= Bulgaria in the Eurovision Song Contest 2017 =

- Eurovision Song Contest 2017
- Participating broadcaster: Bulgarian National Television (BNT)
- Country: Bulgaria
- Selection process: Internal selection
- Announcement date: 13 March 2017

Competing entry
- Song: "Beautiful Mess"
- Artist: Kristian Kostov
- Songwriters: Borislav Milanov; Sebastian Arman; Joacim Bo Persson; Alex Omar; Alexander V. Blay

Placement
- Semi-final result: Qualified (1st, 403 points)
- Final result: 2nd, 615 points

Participation chronology

Bulgaria was represented at the Eurovision Song Contest 2017 with the song "Beautiful Mess", written by Borislav Milanov, Sebastian Arman, Joacim Bo Persson, Alex Omar, and Alexander V. Blay, and performed by Kristian Kostov. The Bulgarian participating broadcaster, Bulgarian National Television (BNT), announced on 13 March 2017 that Kristian Kostov had been selected to compete at the contest. The song that Kostov competed with, "Beautiful Mess", was also internally selected and was presented to the public on the same day.

Bulgaria was drawn to compete in the second semi-final of the Eurovision Song Contest which took place on 11 May 2017. Performing during the show in position 15, "Beautiful Mess" was announced among the top 10 entries of the second semi-final and therefore qualified to compete in the final on 13 May. It was later revealed that Bulgaria placed first out of the 18 participating countries in the semi-final with 403 points. In the final, Bulgaria performed in position 25 and placed second out of the 26 participating countries, scoring 615 points. This marked Bulgaria's second best placing in the history of the contest.

== Background ==
Prior to the 2017 contest, Bulgarian National Television (BNT) had participated in the Eurovision Song Contest representing Bulgaria ten times since its first entry in 2005. It achieved their best result in the contest in 2016 with the song "If Love Was a Crime" performed by Poli Genova, which placed fourth. To this point, only two Bulgarian entries had managed to have qualified to the Eurovision final; they had failed to qualify to the final with their other eight entries.

As part of its duties as participating broadcaster, BNT organises the selection of its entry in the Eurovision Song Contest and broadcasts the event in the country. The broadcaster confirmed its participation in the 2017 contest on 29 September 2016. In the past, BNT had alternated between both internal selections and national finals in order to select its entry. In 2016, the broadcaster internally selected the entry, a selection procedure that continued for its 2017 entry.

== Before Eurovision ==
=== Internal selection ===
On 22 December 2016, BNT opened a submission period for producers to submit their proposals until 20 January 2017. Each proposal was required to contain both the artist and song as well as the staging concept of the entry. Artists were required to be Bulgarian citizens and have experience of singing live, while eligible producers were those that have experience in artist management and have produced at least three projects which have had a high level of popularity in the past two years. Songs were required to contain partial Bulgarian involvement. On 27 January 2017, the broadcaster announced that six entries had been shortlisted and evaluated by three focus groups: BNT representatives, music professionals and international representatives.

On 13 March 2017, BNT announced that Kristian Kostov had been selected to represent Bulgaria in Kyiv. His song "Beautiful Mess" was presented through the release of the official lyrics video via the official Eurovision Song Contest's YouTube channel. Kristian Kostov previously participated in the fourth season of X Factor Bulgaria where he was the runner-up. "Beautiful Mess" was written by members of the songwriting team Symphonix International: Borislav Milanov, Sebastian Arman, Joacim Bo Persson, Alex Omar and Alexander V. Blay.

"Beautiful Mess" is authentic, interesting and transmits the sentiment and the main idea of the song. I like the song, because it's what I am. Last November, I started working with Bobby (Borislav Milanov) with the idea to submit a song for Eurovision either for this year or next. As a performer, now I'm trying to find myself and actually "Beautiful Mess" is my first song that has a deeper meaning. I like it a lot. My vision for the future is actually to do projects that make sense, so that's a step in the right direction for me. Besides this, my fans will see me in a different light than in my past projects, so I am really curious to find out what their reaction will be.

— Kristian Kostov about "Beautiful Mess"

=== Promotion ===
Kristian Kostov made several appearances across Europe to specifically promote "Beautiful Mess" as the Bulgarian Eurovision entry. On 2 April, Kostov performed during the London Eurovision Party, which was held at the Café de Paris venue in London, United Kingdom and hosted by Nicki French and Paddy O'Connell. Between 3 and 6 April, Kostov took part in promotional activities in Tel Aviv, Israel where he performed during the Israel Calling event held at the Ha'teatron venue. On 8 April, Kostov performed during the Eurovision in Concert event which was held at the Melkweg venue in Amsterdam, Netherlands and hosted by Cornald Maas and Selma Björnsdóttir. On 15 April, Kostov performed during the Eurovision Spain Pre-Party, which was held at the Sala La Riviera venue in Madrid, Spain.

== At Eurovision ==
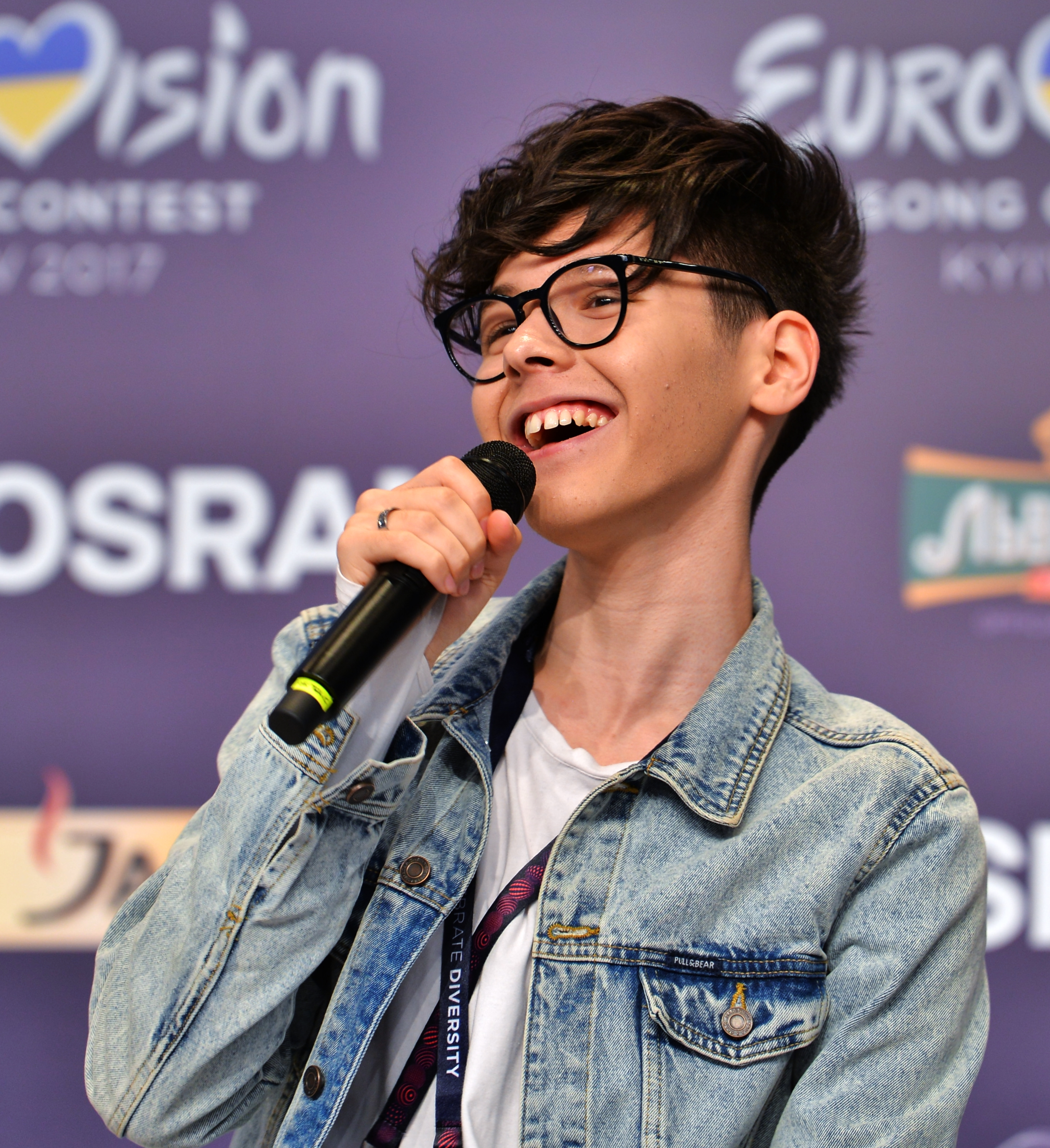
Kristian Kostov during a press meet and greet

According to Eurovision rules, all nations with the exceptions of the host country and the "Big Five" (France, Germany, Italy, Spain, and the United Kingdom) are required to qualify from one of two semi-finals in order to compete for the final; the top ten countries from each semi-final progress to the final. The European Broadcasting Union (EBU) split up the competing countries into six different pots based on voting patterns from previous contests, with countries with favourable voting histories put into the same pot. On 31 January 2017, a special allocation draw was held which placed each country into one of the two semi-finals, as well as which half of the show they would perform in. Bulgaria was placed into the second semi-final, to be held on 11 May 2017, and was scheduled to perform in the second half of the show.

Once all the competing songs for the 2017 contest had been released, the running order for the semi-finals was decided by the shows' producers rather than through another draw, so that similar songs were not placed next to each other. Bulgaria was set to perform in position 16, following the entry from Belarus and before the entry from Lithuania. But after Russia was removed from the running order of the competition following their withdrawal from the contest, Bulgaria's position shifted to 15.

The two semi-finals and the final were broadcast in Bulgaria on BNT 1 with commentary by Elena Rosberg and Georgi Kushvaliev. BNT appointed Boryana Gramatikova as its spokesperson to announced the top 12-point score awarded by the Bulgarian jury during the final.

=== Semi-final ===
Kristian Kostov took part in technical rehearsals on 3 May and 6 May, followed by dress rehearsals on 10 and 11 May. This included the jury show on 10 May where the professional juries of each country watched and voted on the competing entries.

The Bulgarian performance featured Kristian Kostov performing in a black jacket and trousers with a white shirt underneath. The stage colours were black and blue and the LED screens displayed white dynamic lines and shapes that transitioned to a torrential rainstorm effect as the song progressed. The performance also featured holograms that Kostov interacted with. The stage concept for the Bulgarian performance was developed by Swedish artistic director Sacha Jean-Baptiste. Three off-stage backing vocalists joined Kristian Kostov: Borislav Borisov Dimitrov, Cesár Sampson and Vlado Mihailov. Sampson would go on to represent Austria in 2018, while Mihailov would go on to represent Bulgaria in 2018 as part of the group Equinox.

At the end of the show, Bulgaria was announced as having finished in the top 10 and subsequently qualifying for the grand final. It was later revealed that Bulgaria placed first in the semi-final, receiving a total of 403 points: 204 points from the televoting and 199 points from the juries.

=== Final ===
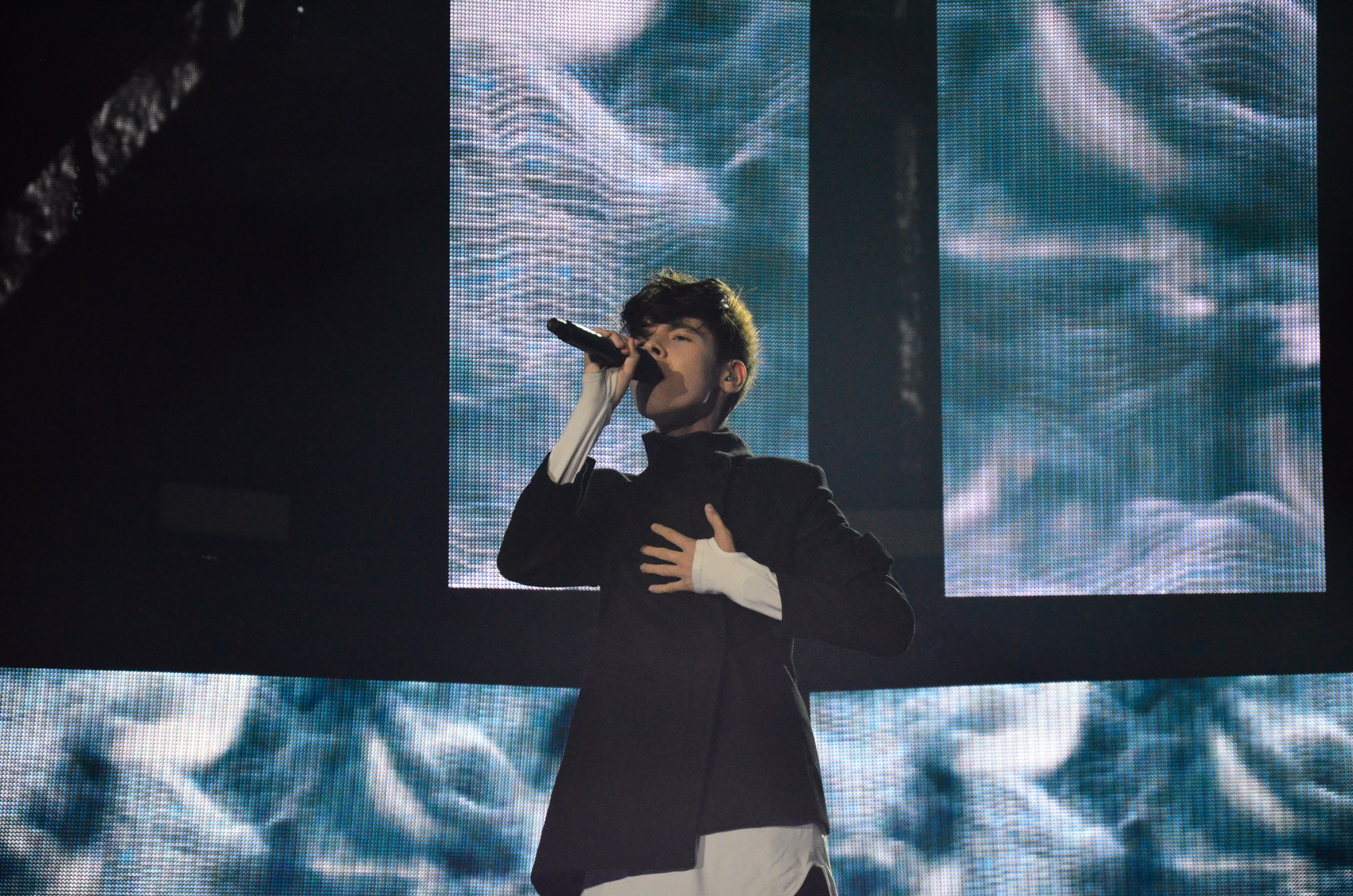
Kristian Kostov during a rehearsal before the final

Shortly after the second semi-final, a winners' press conference was held for the ten qualifying countries. As part of this press conference, the qualifying artists took part in a draw to determine which half of the grand final they would subsequently participate in. This draw was done in the reverse order the countries appeared in the semi-final running order. Bulgaria was drawn to compete in the second half. Following this draw, the shows' producers decided upon the running order of the final, as they had done for the semi-finals. Bulgaria was subsequently placed to perform in position 25, following the entry from Sweden and before the entry from France.

Kristian Kostov once again took part in dress rehearsals on 12 and 13 May before the final, including the jury final where the professional juries cast their final votes before the live show. Kristian Kostov performed a repeat of his semi-final performance during the final on 13 May. Bulgaria placed second in the final, scoring 615 points: 337 points from the televoting and 278 points from the juries. This marked Bulgaria's second best result in the contest to date.

=== Voting ===
Voting during the three shows involved each country awarding two sets of points from 1-8, 10 and 12: one from their professional jury and the other from televoting. Each nation's jury consisted of five music industry professionals who are citizens of the country they represent, with their names published before the contest to ensure transparency. This jury judged each entry based on: vocal capacity; the stage performance; the song's composition and originality; and the overall impression by the act. In addition, no member of a national jury was permitted to be related in any way to any of the competing acts in such a way that they cannot vote impartially and independently. The individual rankings of each jury member as well as the nation's televoting results were released shortly after the grand final.

Below is a breakdown of points awarded to Bulgaria and awarded by Bulgaria in the second semi-final and grand final of the contest, and the breakdown of the jury voting and televoting conducted during the two shows:

==== Points awarded to Bulgaria ====
Points awarded to Bulgaria (Semi-final 2)
Score	Televote	Jury
12 points	Belarus; Denmark; Germany; Hungary; Israel; Malta; Netherlands; Norway; San Marino	Austria; Belarus; Estonia; Hungary; Ireland; Macedonia; Malta; Netherlands; Norway; Switzerland
10 points	Estonia; Ireland; Lithuania; Macedonia; Ukraine	Germany; Lithuania; Serbia
8 points	Austria; Croatia; France; Romania; Serbia	Romania; San Marino; Ukraine
7 points		France
6 points	Switzerland	Croatia; Denmark; Israel
5 points		
4 points		
3 points		
2 points		
1 point		

Points awarded to Bulgaria (Final)
Score	Televote	Jury
12 points	Azerbaijan; Belarus; Czech Republic; Hungary; Macedonia; San Marino; United Kingdom	Belarus; Estonia; Macedonia; Norway
10 points	Albania; Cyprus; Denmark; Greece; Israel; Malta; Serbia; Spain	Albania; Austria; Belgium; Croatia; Hungary; Ireland; Moldova; Netherlands; Romania
8 points	Belgium; Croatia; Italy; Moldova; Netherlands; Norway; Poland; Portugal; Romania	Australia; Germany; Latvia; Malta; Slovenia; Switzerland
7 points	Armenia; Austria; Estonia; Finland; Georgia; Latvia; Lithuania; Slovenia; Sweden	Cyprus; Israel; Lithuania; Sweden; United Kingdom
6 points	Ireland; Montenegro; Switzerland	Finland; Georgia; Iceland; Poland; Serbia; Spain
5 points	Australia; Germany	France
4 points	France; Iceland	Denmark
3 points		
2 points	Ukraine	Azerbaijan; Czech Republic; Greece; Italy; Montenegro; San Marino
1 point		

==== Points awarded by Bulgaria ====
Points awarded by Bulgaria (Semi-final 2)
Score	Televote	Jury
12 points	Macedonia	Austria
10 points	Israel	Israel
8 points	Hungary	Netherlands
7 points	Romania	Malta
6 points	Croatia	Croatia
5 points	Belarus	Norway
4 points	Switzerland	Denmark
3 points	Norway	Switzerland
2 points	Estonia	Serbia
1 point	Netherlands	Ireland

Points awarded by Bulgaria (Final)
Score	Televote	Jury
12 points	France	Austria
10 points	Moldova	Netherlands
8 points	Romania	Israel
7 points	Portugal	Poland
6 points	Hungary	Greece
5 points	Greece	Azerbaijan
4 points	Belgium	Armenia
3 points	Cyprus	Romania
2 points	Sweden	Belarus
1 point	Croatia	Ukraine

==== Detailed voting results ====
The following members comprised the Bulgarian jury:

- Milka Miteva (jury chairperson) – musician, pianist, lecturer at the New Bulgarian University, headmaster of "L. Pipkov" National Musical School
- Orlin Pavlov – singer, actor, represented Bulgaria in the 2005 contest as part of Kaffe
- Maria Grancharova – singer, producer
- Atanas Stoyanov – journalist, radio host and presenter
- Nelly Rangelova – pop singer

Detailed voting results from Bulgaria (Semi-final 2)
R/O	Country	Jury							Televote	
R/O	Country	M. Miteva	O. Pavlov	M. Grancharova	A. Stoyanov	N. Rangelova	Rank	Points	Rank	Points
01	Serbia	15	13	8	5	5	9	2	15	
02	Austria	1	1	5	1	3	1	12	11	
03	Macedonia	6	17	14	6	6	11		1	12
04	Malta	7	6	6	4	4	4	7	17	
05	Romania	16	14	9	17	16	16		4	7
06	Netherlands	4	2	1	3	2	3	8	10	1
07	Hungary	17	15	17	11	17	17		3	8
08	Denmark	9	3	10	10	10	7	4	13	
09	Ireland	10	9	12	8	7	10	1	12	
10	San Marino	8	16	16	12	9	13		14	
11	Croatia	3	4	3	13	8	5	6	5	6
12	Norway	5	8	4	9	11	6	5	8	3
13	Switzerland	11	7	7	7	12	8	3	7	4
14	Belarus	12	10	11	14	13	12		6	5
15	Bulgaria									
16	Lithuania	14	11	13	16	14	14		16	
17	Estonia	13	12	15	15	15	15		9	2
18	Israel	2	5	2	2	1	2	10	2	10

Detailed voting results from Bulgaria (Final)
R/O	Country	Jury							Televote	
R/O	Country	M. Miteva	O. Pavlov	M. Grancharova	A. Stoyanov	N. Rangelova	Rank	Points	Rank	Points
01	Israel	7	10	5	9	4	3	8	11	
02	Poland	3	24	3	4	3	4	7	23	
03	Belarus	2	22	12	10	11	9	2	14	
04	Austria	5	11	4	5	5	1	12	24	
05	Armenia	6	14	7	3	21	7	4	12	
06	Netherlands	1	16	1	7	10	2	10	17	
07	Moldova	24	23	10	13	12	20		2	10
08	Hungary	23	4	25	8	9	14		5	6
09	Italy	14	9	15	15	16	13		13	
10	Denmark	4	12	21	20	22	19		22	
11	Portugal	15	15	17	23	17	23		4	7
12	Azerbaijan	9	3	20	14	2	6	5	20	
13	Croatia	8	19	6	16	23	16		10	1
14	Australia	13	17	8	11	18	12		18	
15	Greece	11	25	2	1	1	5	6	6	5
16	Spain	20	7	14	17	13	15		21	
17	Norway	21	18	11	21	24	24		15	
18	United Kingdom	10	21	19	22	14	22		19	
19	Cyprus	16	1	22	18	25	21		8	3
20	Romania	22	2	24	2	6	8	3	3	8
21	Germany	25	8	23	24	15	25		25	
22	Ukraine	18	5	16	6	19	10	1	16	
23	Belgium	19	6	18	12	20	17		7	4
24	Sweden	12	13	13	19	7	11		9	2
25	Bulgaria									
26	France	17	20	9	25	8	18		1	12
