= Nobody but You (Cesár Sampson song) =

2018 single by Cesár Sampson

"Nobody But You"

Single by Cesár Sampson
- Released: 9 March 2018
- Length: 3:03
- Label: Symphonix Music
- Songwriters: Cesár Sampson; Borislav Milanov; Sebastian Arman; Joacim Persson; Johan Alkenäs

Cesár Sampson singles chronology
"Nobody But You" (2018)	"Stone Cold" (2019)

Music video
- "Nobody but You" on YouTube

Eurovision Song Contest 2018 entry
- Country: Austria
- Artist: Cesár Sampson
- Language: English
- Composers: Cesár Sampson; Borislav Milanov; Sebastian Arman; Joacim Persson; Johan Alkenäs
- Lyricists: Cesár Sampson; Borislav Milanov; Sebastian Arman; Joacim Persson; Johan Alkenäs

Finals performance
- Semi-final result: 4th
- Semi-final points: 231
- Final result: 3rd
- Final points: 342

Entry chronology
- ◄ "Running on Air" (2017)
- "Limits" (2019) ►

"Nobody but You" is a song by Austrian singer Cesár Sampson. The song represented Austria in the Eurovision Song Contest 2018. The song title was revealed to the public on 7 December 2017, and was composed by Sampson himself, Borislav Milanov and Sebastian Arman (both of the collective Symphonix International), and by Swedish songwriter Joacim Persson who has been involved in the composition of a number of songs for Bulgaria, notably Poli Genova's Eurovision 2016 entry "If Love Was a Crime" and in Kristian Kostov's Eurovision 2017 entry "Beautiful Mess" and by Swedish songwriter Johan Alkenäs. "Nobody but You" was released on 9 March 2018.

== Eurovision Song Contest ==
Cesár Sampson was announced as the Austrian act for the 2018 contest on 5 December 2017, and the title of the song was revealed two days after. Austria competed as the 13th act in the first semi-final and qualified for the Grand Final on 12 May 2018. Following the semi-final, Austria was drawn to perform in the first half of the grand final. The song placed third overall, winning the jury vote but only ranking 13th with the televote.

== Track listing ==
Digital download
No.	Title	Length
1.	"Nobody but You"	3:03

== Charts ==
Chart (2018)	Peak position
Austria (Ö3 Austria Top 40)	1
Belgium (Ultratip Bubbling Under Flanders)	9
Germany (GfK)	93
Greece Digital Singles (IFPI Greece)	79
Iceland (RÚV)	2
Scottish Singles Sales (Official Charts)	63
Spain (PROMUSICAE)	80
Sweden (Sverigetopplistan)	55
Switzerland (Schweizer Hitparade)	45
UK Singles Downloads (Official Charts)	62

== Release history ==
Region	Date	Format	Label
Worldwide	10 March 2018	Digital download	Symphonix Music
