= Nathan Trent =

Austrian singer (born 1992)

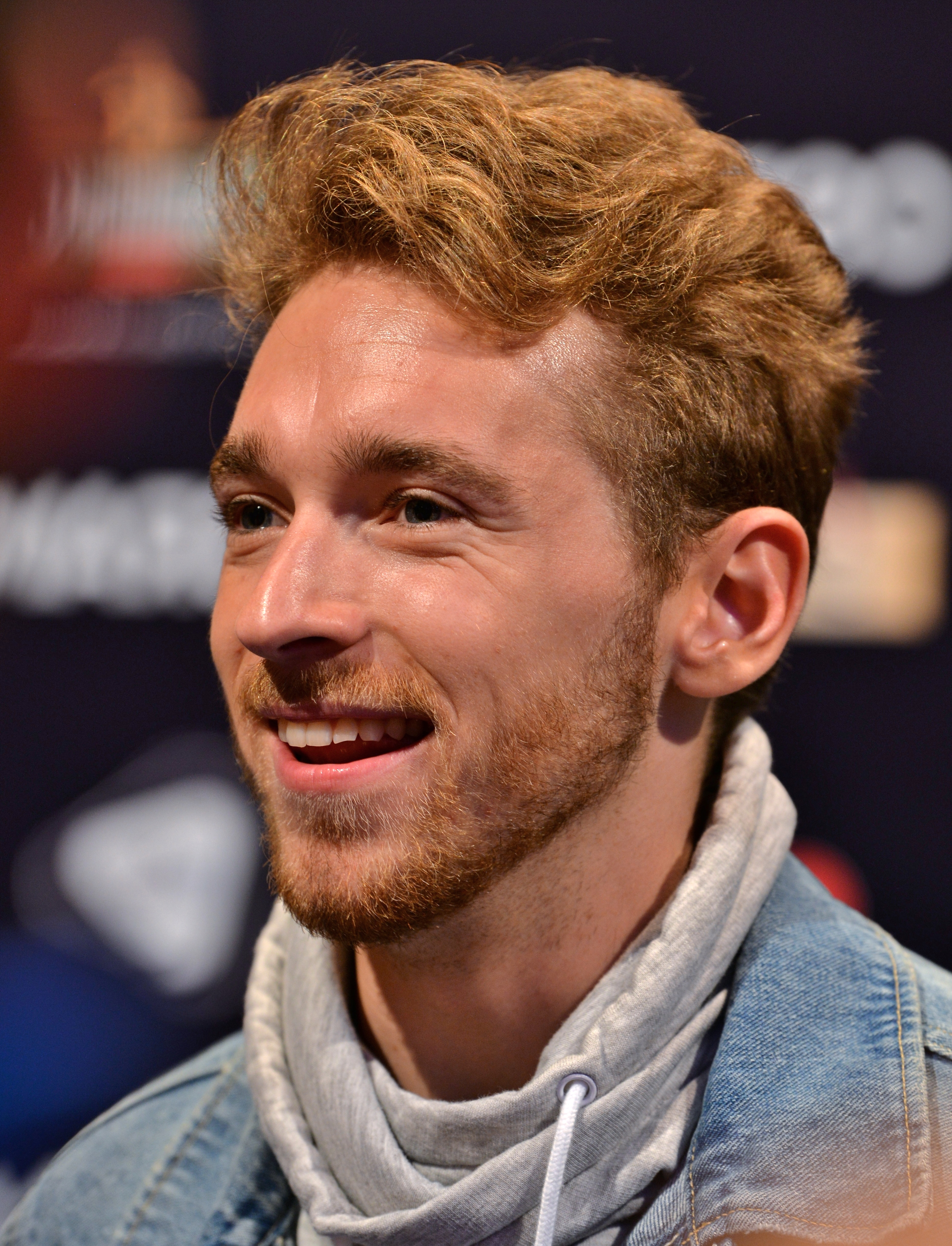
- Trent in 2017

Background information
- Born: Nathanaele Koll; 4 April 1992 (age 33); Innsbruck, Austria
- Genres: Pop
- Occupations: Singer; songwriter
- Instrument: Vocals
- Years active: 2003–present
- Website: http://www.nathantrent.com

Nathanaele Koll (born 4 April 1992), known professionally as Nathan Trent, is an Austrian singer. He represented Austria in the Eurovision Song Contest 2017 with the song "Running on Air" finishing in 16th place.

== Early life ==
Trent was born on 4 April 1992 in Innsbruck, Austria, to an Austrian father, violinist Reinhard Koll, and an Italian mother from Trieste. He was raised speaking both Italian and German. He graduated from the Music and Arts University of the City of Vienna.

== Career ==
=== 2016–present: Eurovision Song Contest ===
On 18 June 2016, Trent released his debut single "Like It Is". On 19 December 2016, Trent was announced as the Austrian representative in the Eurovision Song Contest 2017. His song, "Running on Air", was released on 28 February 2017. At the time of his selection as the Austrian entrant, Trent was one of the 33 artists that had been shortlisted in Unser Song 2017, the contest to select the German entrant in the Eurovision Song Contest 2017. He was automatically eliminated, as a performer can not represent more than one country in the same year by European Broadcasting Union regulations. He ultimately finished 16th in the contest, with 93 points.

== Discography ==
=== Studio albums ===
Title	Details
The Stages of Change	Released: 1 April 2022; Format: Digital download; Label: Uptrent Records

=== Singles ===
==== As lead artist ====
Title	Year	Peak chart positions			Album
Title	Year	AUT	NLD Tip	SWE Heat.	Album
"Like It Is"	2016	—	—	—	Non-album singles
"Running on Air"	2017	18	28	4	Non-album singles
"Good Vibes"	2017	—	—	—	Non-album singles
"Secrets" (with J-MOX)	2018	—	—	—	Non-album singles
"Killer"	2018	—	—	—	Non-album singles
"Legacy"	2019	—	—	—	Non-album singles
"Over You" (with J-MOX)	2019	—	—	—	Non-album singles
"I Got Me"	2019	—	—	—	Non-album singles
"Sweet Dreams"	2019	—	—	—	Non-album singles
"Timeline"	2020	—	—	—	Non-album singles
"Millions" (with J-MOX)	2020	—	—	—	Non-album singles
"Most of It"	2020	—	—	—	Non-album singles
"Late Night Friends"	2022	—	—	—	The Stages of Change
"Just Another"	2024	—	—	—	Non-album singles
"Fine" (with Fünkenstein)	2024	—	—	—	Non-album singles
"Butterfly Effect"	2024	—	—	—	Non-album singles
"—" denotes a recording that did not chart or was not released in that territory.

==== As featured artist ====
Title	Year	Album
"Won't Let You Go" (Poptracker featuring Nathan Trent)	2018	Non-album single

=== Television ===
Title	Year	Notes
Eurovision Song CZ	2018	International jury member
The Masked Singer Austria	2020	Main panellist

Preceded by Zoë with "Loin d'ici"	Austria in the Eurovision Song Contest; 2017	Succeeded by Cesár Sampson with "Nobody but You"
