= Alex Vargas =

Danish singer

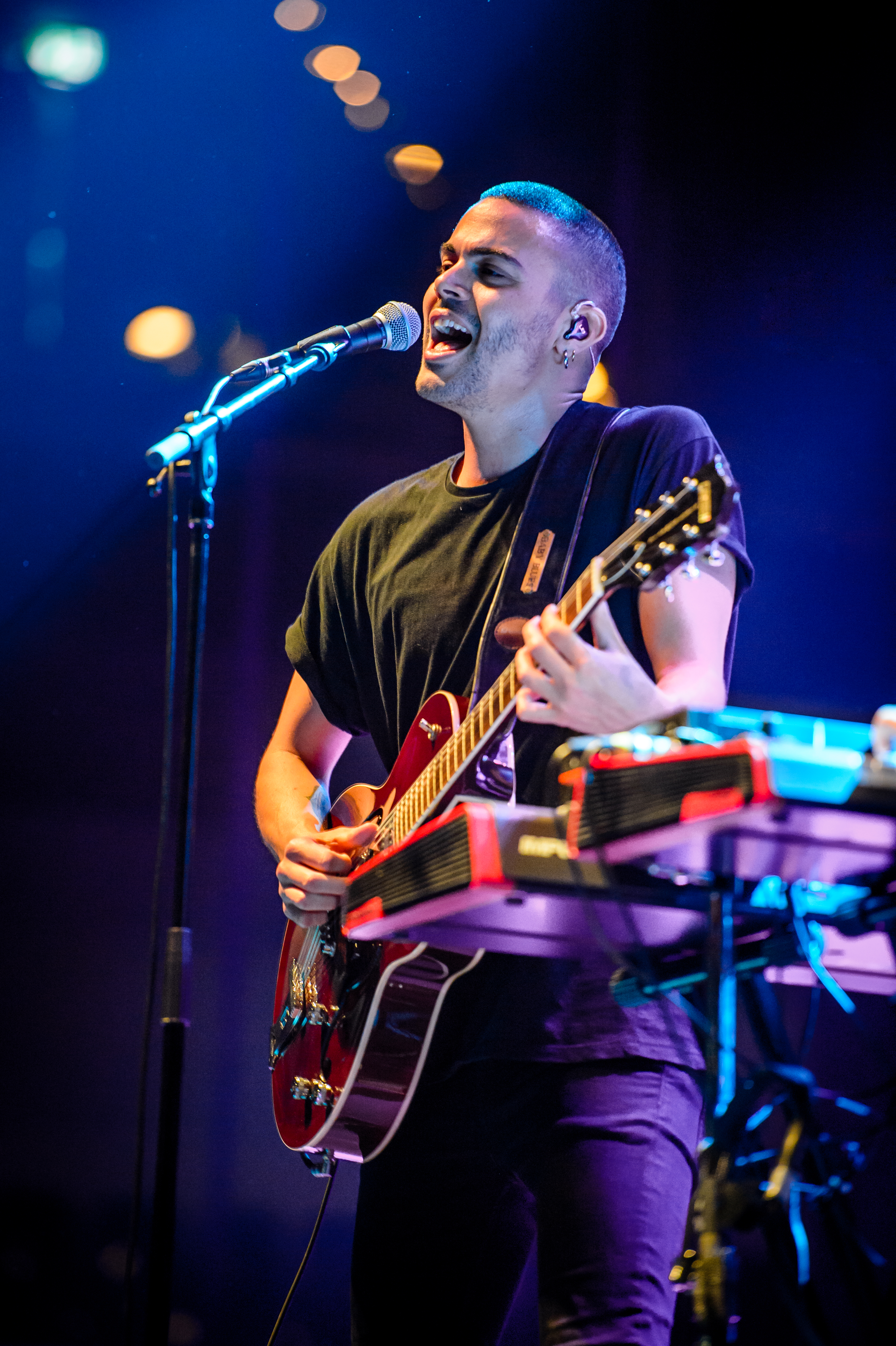
- Vargas at Rock im Park 2017

Background information
- Born: Alexander Vargas Blay; 17 February 1988 (age 38); Hørsholm, Denmark
- Genres: Rock; soul; alternative
- Occupations: Singer; musician; songwriter
- Instruments: Vocals; guitar
- Years active: 2003–present
- Labels: Copenhagen; Locomotion
- Website: alexvargas.com

Alexander Vargas Blay (born 17 February 1988) is a Danish singer, guitarist and songwriter. He was born in Denmark to a Danish-English mother and a Uruguayan father.

== Career ==
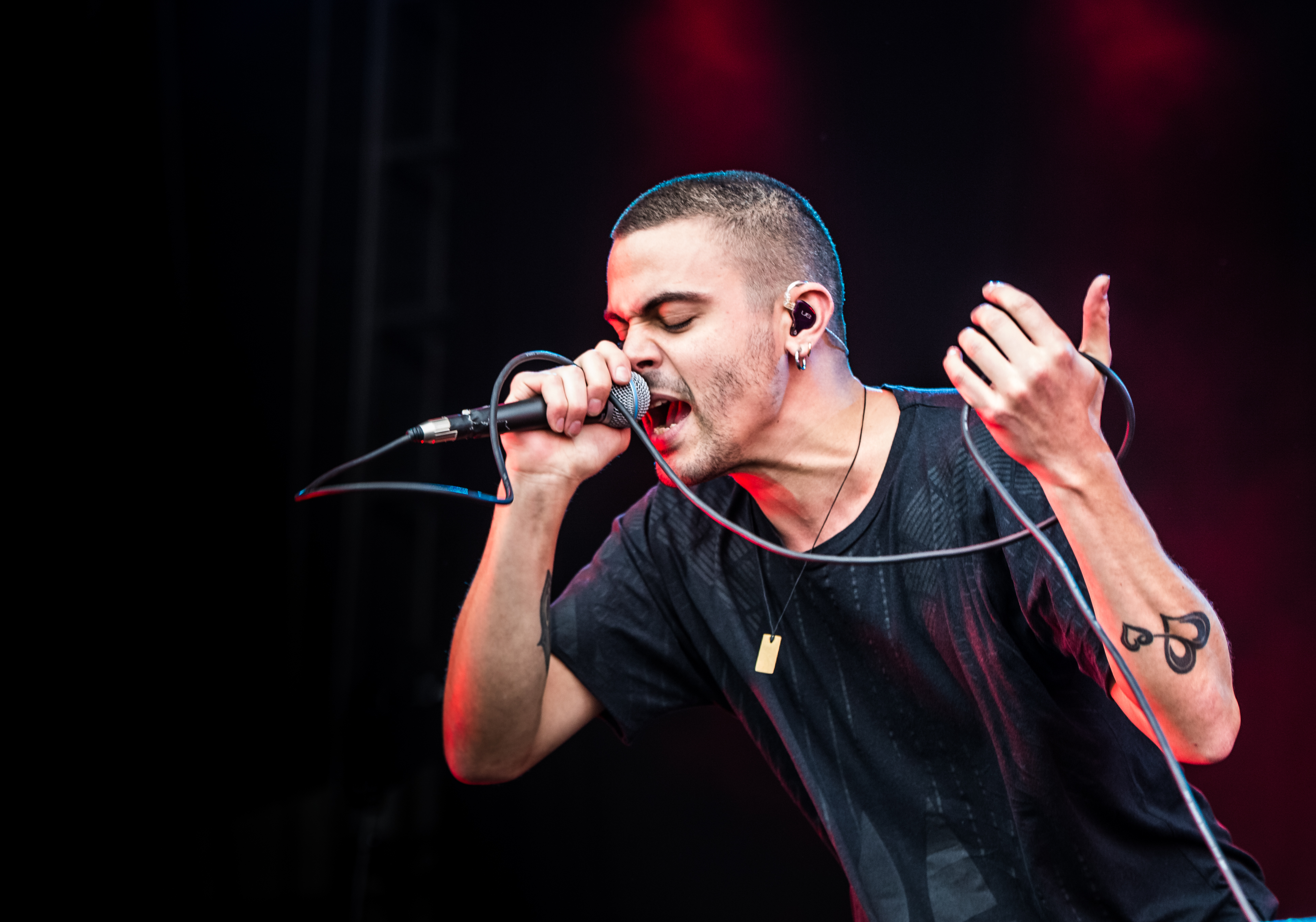
Vargas at Rock am Ring 2017

Vargas relocated to London at age 17 to pursue his musical career where he was signed to Geffen Records and formed the band Vagabond. The band toured the UK selling out two headline tours and also performed at the Glastonbury, T in the Park and V music festivals.

On 16 February 2010, Vargas disbanded Vagabond in order to pursue a solo career.

On 12 and 13 October 2013, Vargas performed as a vocalist with trance band Above & Beyond at their acoustic show at the Greek Theater in Los Angeles. He co-wrote and featured on 5 songs from their fourth studio album We Are All We Need, which debuted at No. 1 on the US Dance/Electronic Albums (Billboard) chart, No. 12 on the UK album chart and No. 34 on the US Billboard 200 chart.

In 2014, Vargas signed with Copenhagen Records and started working on material for his forthcoming EP and album with collaborator Tommy Sheen who also performs live with Vargas. The first release on Copenhagen Records was the single "Till Forever Runs Out" followed by "Solid Ground" on 30 March 2015. "Solid Ground" became a viral hit and is included on the EP Giving Up the Ghost released 22 January 2016. The title track however premiered on US music blog Pigeons & Planes on 16 September 2015. The EP peaked at No. 1 on the Danish and Dutch iTunes Album Charts while the feature single, "Shackled Up" made it to No. 1 on the Danish iTunes Singles Chart and No. 4 on the Dutch iTunes Singles Chart.

UK press and blogs have described Alex as "engrossing, poetic and openly emotional, Vargas' soulful approach is winning fans – prepare to become one of them". –Clash Music

Vargas is a BMI writer and is published by Atlas Music Publishing out of New York.

On 16 February 2017, Vargas announced that his second full-length album, Cohere, would be released on 31 March 2017.

He co-wrote Bulgaria's entry in the Eurovision Song Contest 2017. The song called "Beautiful Mess" was performed by Russian-born Kristian Kostov and reached 2nd place, Bulgaria's best result at the time until Dara (Bulgarian singer) won in Eurovision Song Contest 2026.

In 2023, Vargas appeared in an episode of the third season of Ted Lasso playing a busker performing a cover of the Beatles song Hey Jude.

== Discography ==
=== Albums ===
List of albums, with selected chart positions
Title	Album details	Peak chart positions	Certifications
Title	Album details	DEN	Certifications
Rookie	Released: 2003; Label: VIA Music; Formats: CD	—	
Cohere	Released: 31 March 2017; Label: Alex Vargas, Copenhagen; Formats: LP, CD, digital download	11	IFPI DEN: Gold
Ego (Super/Trip/Maniac)	Released: 18 October 2019; Label: Alex Vargas, Copenhagen; Formats: LP, CD, digital download	14	
Big Big Machine	Released: 3 March 2023; Label: Stellar Records, Embassy of Music; Formats: LP, digital download	3	
Vertigo	Released: 20 March 2026; Label: Universal Music; Formats: LP, digital download	5	
"—" denotes album that did not chart or was not released

=== EPs ===
List of albums, with selected chart positions and certifications
Title	Album details	Peak chart positions	Certifications	Sales
Title	Album details	DEN	Certifications	Sales
Howl	Released: 26 September 2013; Label: Alex Vargas, Tiger Music; Formats: CD, digital download	—		World: 10,000
Giving Up the Ghost	Released: 10 February 2015; Label: Alex Vargas, Copenhagen Records; Formats: Digital download, LP	14	IFPI-DEN: Gold	
superEGO	Released: 3 May 2019; Label: Copenhagen Records; Formats: Digital download	—		
EGOtrip	Released: 24 May 2019; Label: Copenhagen Records; Formats: Digital download	—		
Alex Vargas Synger Toppen Af Poppen	Released: 25 September 2021; Label: Sony Music Entertainment Denmark, Universal Music Denmark; Formats: Digital download	—		
"—" denotes album that did not chart or was not released

=== Singles ===
List of singles as lead artist, with selected chart positions and certifications, showing year released and album name
Title	Year	Peak chart positions		Certifications	Album
Title	Year	DEN	NLD	Certifications	Album
"More"	2012	—	88		Non-album singles
"Till Forever Runs Out"	2014	—	—		Non-album singles
"Solid Ground"	2015	—	—	IFPI-DEN: Gold	Giving Up the Ghost
"Shackled Up"	2016	26	95	IFPI-DEN: Platinum	Giving Up the Ghost
"Higher Love"	2016	—	—	IFPI-DEN: Gold	Cohere
"Higher Love (Decco Remix)"	2016	—	—		Cohere
"Inclosure"	2017	—	—		Cohere
"Slowly"	2018	—	—		Non-album single
"Silent Treatment"	2018	—	—		Ego
"Now That I Think About It"	2018	—	—		Ego
"The Killing Kind"	2019	—	—		Ego
"Police Bells & Church Sirens"	2021	31	—		Toffen af Poppen 2021 Synger Simon Kvamm
"Yougazer"	2022	—	—		BIG BIG MACHINE
"Mama, I've Been Dying"	2022	—	—		BIG BIG MACHINE
"Pages"	2022	—	—		BIG BIG MACHINE

== Awards and nominations ==
Year	Award	Category	Nominee	Result	Ref.
2016	Danish Music Awards	Danish Artist of the Year	Alex Vargas	Won	
2016	Danish Music Awards	New Danish Name of the Year	Alex Vargas	Nominated	
2016	Danish Music Awards	Danish Songwriter of the Year	Alex Vargas	Nominated	
2016	Danish Music Awards	New Danish Name of the Year	Giving Up The Ghost	Nominated	
2016	Danish Music Awards	Danish Release of the Year	Giving Up The Ghost	Nominated	
2016	P3 Guld	The P3 Award	Alex Vargas	Nominated	
2016	P3 Guld	The P3 Listeners' Top Track	"Shackled Up"	Nominated	
2016	GAFFA-Prisen	Danish Album of the Year	Giving Up The Ghost	Nominated	
2016	GAFFA-Prisen	Danish Pop Album of the Year	Giving Up The Ghost	Nominated	
2016	GAFFA-Prisen	Danish Male Artist of the Year	Alex Vargas	Nominated	
2016	GAFFA-Prisen	New Danish Name of the Year	Alex Vargas	Nominated	
2016	GAFFA-Prisen	Danish Live Name of the Year	Alex Vargas	Nominated	
2017	Zulu Awards	New Name of the Year	Alex Vargas	Nominated	
