= Austria in the Eurovision Song Contest 2017 =

- Eurovision Song Contest 2017
- Participating broadcaster: Österreichischer Rundfunk (ORF)
- Country: Austria
- Selection process: Internal selection
- Announcement date: Artist: 19 December 2016; Song: 28 February 2017

Competing entry
- Song: "Running on Air"
- Artist: Nathan Trent
- Songwriters: Nathan Trent; Bernhard Penzias

Placement
- Semi-final result: Qualified (7th, 147 points)
- Final result: 16th, 93 points

Participation chronology

Austria was represented at the Eurovision Song Contest 2017 with the song "Running on Air" written by Nathan Trent and Bernhard Penzias. The song was performed by Nathan Trent. On 19 December 2016, the Austrian broadcaster Österreichischer Rundfunk (ORF) announced that they had internally selected Nathan Trent to compete at the 2017 contest in Kyiv, Ukraine, while "Running on Air" was presented to the public on 28 February 2017.

Austria was drawn to compete in the second semi-final of the Eurovision Song Contest which took place on 11 May 2017. Performing during the show in position 2, "Running on Air" was announced among the top 10 entries of the second semi-final and therefore qualified to compete in the final on 13 May. It was later revealed that Austria placed seventh out of the 18 participating countries in the semi-final with 147 points. In the final, Austria performed in position 4 and placed sixteenth out of the 26 participating countries, scoring 93 points.

== Background ==
Prior to the 2017 contest, Austria has participated in the Eurovision Song Contest forty-nine times since its first entry in 1957. The nation has won the contest on two occasions: in 1966 with the song "Merci, Chérie" performed by Udo Jürgens and in 2014 with the song "Rise Like a Phoenix" performed by Conchita Wurst. Following the introduction of semi-finals for the 2004 contest, Austria has featured in only five finals. Austria's least successful result has been last place, which they have achieved on eight occasions, most recently in 2012. Austria has also received nul points on four occasions; in 1962, 1988, 1991 and 2015.

The Austrian national broadcaster, Österreichischer Rundfunk (ORF), broadcasts the event within Austria and organises the selection process for the nation's entry. ORF confirmed their intentions to participate at the 2017 Eurovision Song Contest on 28 May 2016. From 2011 to 2013 as well as in 2015 and 2016, ORF had set up national finals with several artists to choose both the song and performer to compete at Eurovision for Austria, with both the public and a panel of jury members involved in the selection. For the 2017 Eurovision Song Contest, ORF held an internal selection to choose the artist and song to represent Austria at the contest. This method had last been used by ORF in 2014.

== Before Eurovision ==
=== Internal selection ===
Artists were nominated by the ORF Eurovision Song Contest Team led by ORF chief editor Stefan Zechner, which collaborated with music experts Christof Straub and Eberhard Forcher who also worked on the selection of the Austrian entry in 2016, to submit songs to the broadcaster. On 19 December 2016, ORF announced that they had internally selected Nathan Trent to represent Austria in Kyiv. Trent was also among the 33 artists shortlisted to compete in the 2017 German national final but later withdrew in favour of representing Austria. Prior to the announcement of Nathan Trent as the Austrian representative, the band Russkaja was rumoured to have been selected by the broadcaster.

On 26 February 2017, the song "Running on Air" written by Nathan Trent himself together with Bernhard Penzias was announced as the Austrian entry for the contest. While its release date was given as 28 February, the song leaked online through Spotify and YouTube the same day as its announcement. The official presentation of the song took place on 28 February 2017 during the radio show Ö3-Wecker, aired on Ö3. Nathan Trent also recorded an Italian version of the song titled "Fino a che volerò", and a Spanish version titled "Aire" which was remixed and produced by Vincent Bueno.

=== Promotion ===
Nathan Trent made several appearances across Europe to specifically promote "Running on Air" as the Austrian Eurovision entry. On 2 April, Trent performed during the London Eurovision Party, which was held at the Café de Paris venue in London, United Kingdom and hosted by Nicki French. Between 3 and 6 April, Trent took part in promotional activities in Tel Aviv, Israel and performed during the Israel Calling event held at the Ha'teatron venue. On 8 April, Trent performed during the Eurovision in Concert event which was held at the Melkweg venue in Amsterdam, Netherlands and hosted by Cornald Maas and Selma Björnsdóttir. On 15 April, Trent performed during the Eurovision Spain Pre-Party, which was held at the Sala La Riviera venue in Madrid, Spain.

== At Eurovision ==
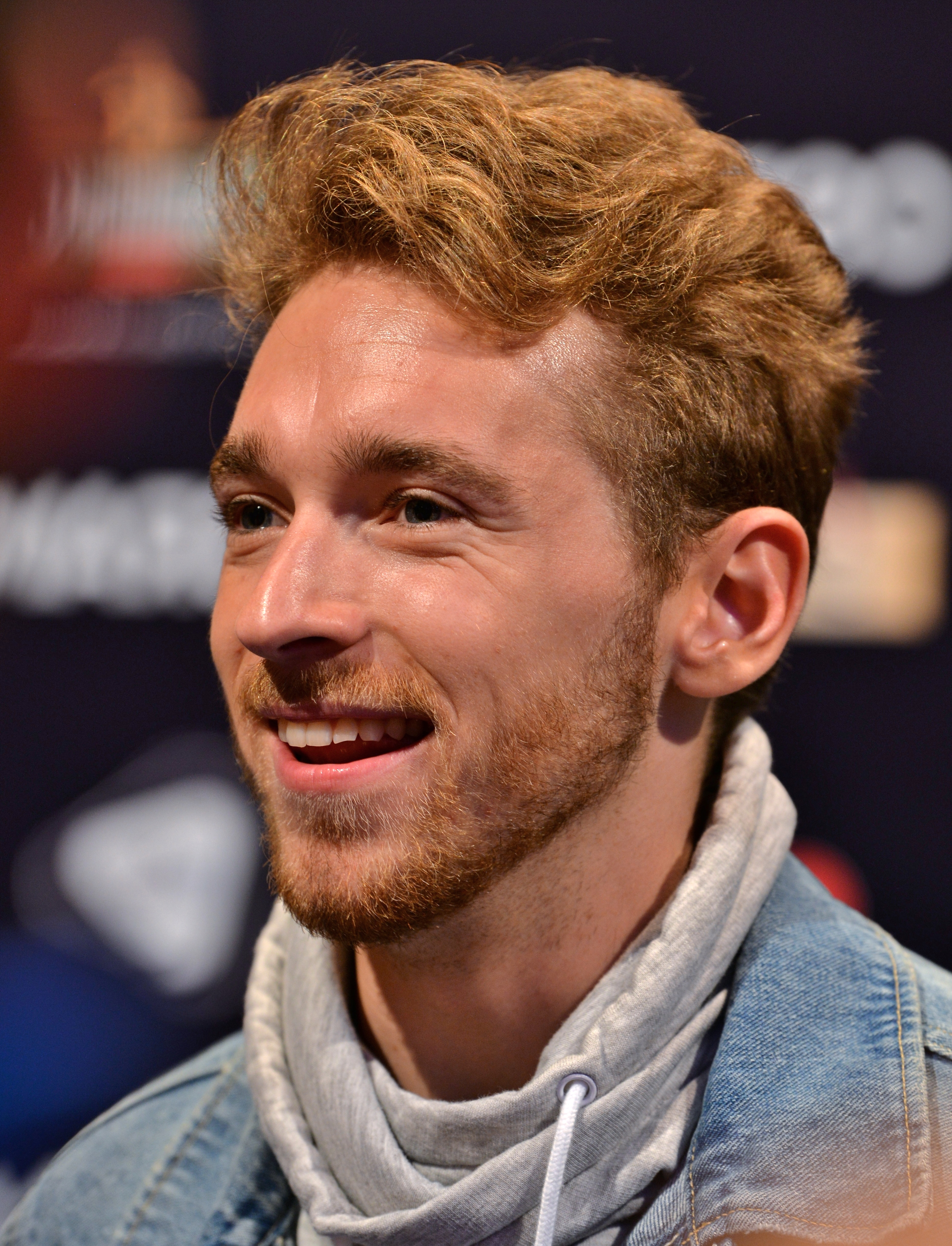
Nathan Trent during a press meet and greet

According to Eurovision rules, all nations with the exceptions of the host country and the "Big Five" (France, Germany, Italy, Spain and the United Kingdom) are required to qualify from one of two semi-finals in order to compete for the final; the top ten countries from each semi-final progress to the final. The European Broadcasting Union (EBU) split up the competing countries into six different pots based on voting patterns from previous contests, with countries with favourable voting histories put into the same pot. On 31 January 2017, a special allocation draw was held which placed each country into one of the two semi-finals, as well as which half of the show they would perform in. Austria was placed into the second semi-final, to be held on 11 May 2017, and was scheduled to perform in the first half of the show.

Once all the competing songs for the 2017 contest had been released, the running order for the semi-finals was decided by the shows' producers rather than through another draw, so that similar songs were not placed next to each other. Austria was set to perform in position 2, following the entry from Serbia and before the entry from Macedonia.

The two semi-finals and the final were broadcast in Austria on ORF eins with commentary by Andi Knoll. The Austrian spokesperson, who announced the top 12-point score awarded by the Austrian jury during the final, was Kristina Inhof.

=== Semi-final ===
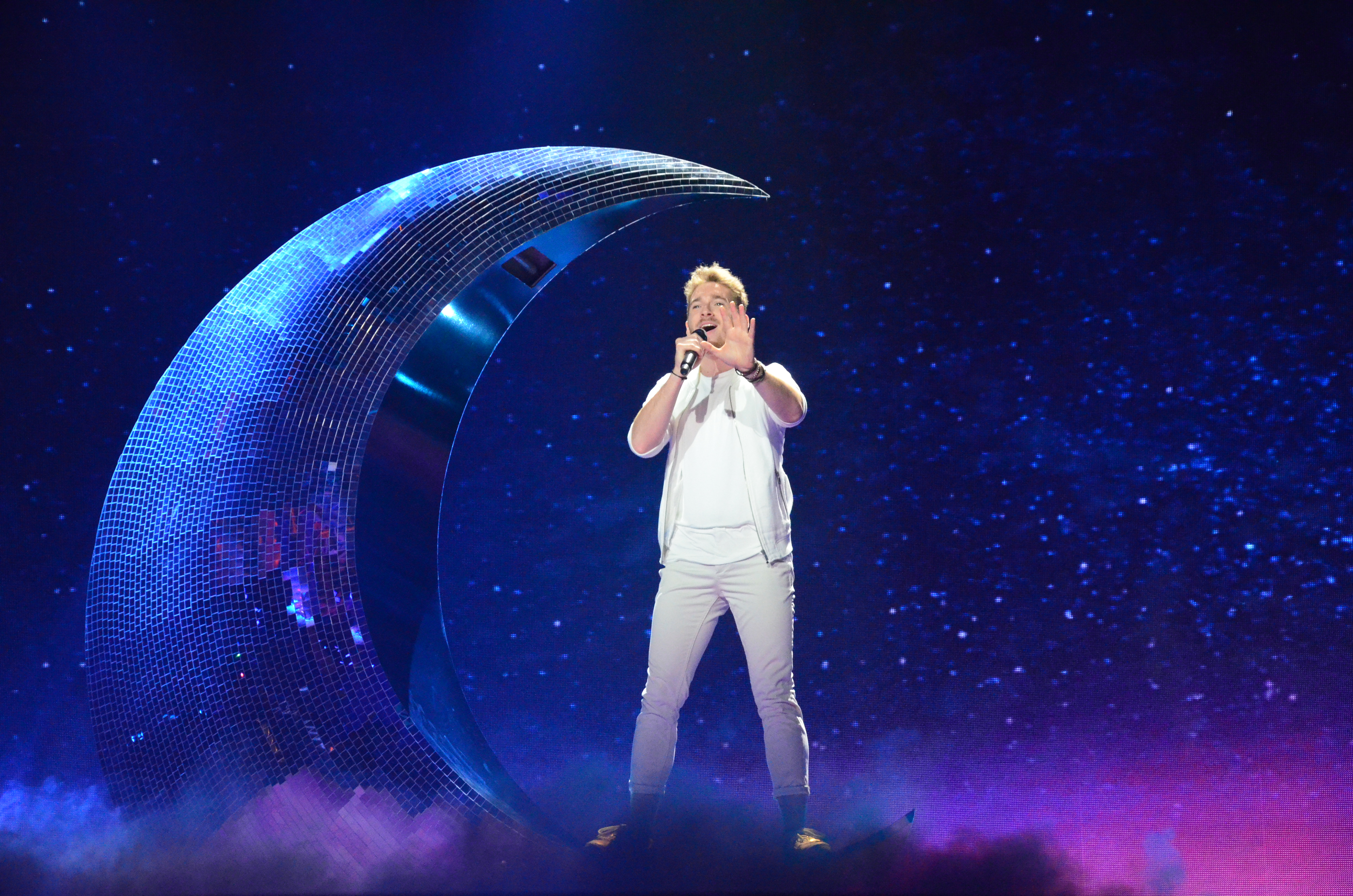
Nathan Trent during a rehearsal before the second semi-final

Nathan Trent took part in technical rehearsals on 2 and 5 May, followed by dress rehearsals on 10 and 11 May. This included the jury show on 10 May where the professional juries of each country watched and voted on the competing entries.

The Austrian performance featured Nathan Trent performing on stage in a white outfit with silver winged shoes. The performance began with Trent sitting on a large silver crescent moon prop made from the same material as a disco ball with large clouds of purple, white, blue and orange smoke appearing on the LED screens, accompanied by yellow beaming lights from the back of the stage and smoke effects. During the performance, Trent jumped from the moon to the front of the stage and returned to the moon afterwards. The four backing vocalists that joined Nathan Trent at the end of the song were: Vincent Bueno, Helena Dema, Florian Sebastian Fitz and Art Demur.

At the end of the show, Austria was announced as having finished in the top 10 and subsequently qualifying for the grand final. It was later revealed that Austria placed seventh in the semi-final, receiving a total of 147 points: 32 points from the televoting and 115 points from the juries.

=== Final ===
Shortly after the second semi-final, a winners' press conference was held for the ten qualifying countries. As part of this press conference, the qualifying artists took part in a draw to determine which half of the grand final they would subsequently participate in. This draw was done in the reverse order the countries appeared in the semi-final running order. Austria was drawn to compete in the first half. Following this draw, the shows' producers decided upon the running order of the final, as they had done for the semi-finals. Austria was subsequently placed to perform in position 4, following the entry from Belarus and before the entry from Armenia.

Nathan Trent once again took part in dress rehearsals on 12 and 13 May before the final, including the jury final where the professional juries cast their final votes before the live show. Nathan Trent performed a repeat of his semi-final performance during the final on 14 May. Austria placed sixteenth in the final, scoring 93 points: 0 points from the televoting and 93 points from the juries.

=== Voting ===
Voting during the three shows involved each country awarding two sets of points from 1–8, 10 and 12: one from their professional jury and the other from televoting. Each nation's jury consisted of five music industry professionals who are citizens of the country they represent, with their names published before the contest to ensure transparency. This jury judged each entry based on: vocal capacity; the stage performance; the song's composition and originality; and the overall impression by the act. In addition, no member of a national jury was permitted to be related in any way to any of the competing acts in such a way that they cannot vote impartially and independently. The individual rankings of each jury member as well as the nation's televoting results were released shortly after the grand final.

Below is a breakdown of points awarded to Austria and awarded by Austria in the second semi-final and grand final of the contest, and the breakdown of the jury voting and televoting conducted during the two shows:

==== Points awarded to Austria ====
Points awarded to Austria (Semi-final 2)
Score	Televote	Jury
12 points		Bulgaria
10 points		Ireland
8 points		Hungary; Israel; Netherlands
7 points		Denmark; San Marino; Switzerland
6 points	Netherlands	Belarus; Germany; Serbia
5 points		Croatia; Estonia; Romania
4 points	Croatia; Germany; Romania	France; Lithuania; Norway
3 points	Denmark; Hungary; Israel	Macedonia
2 points	Switzerland	
1 point	Malta; Serbia; San Marino	

Points awarded to Austria (Final)
Score	Televote	Jury
12 points		Bulgaria
10 points		Portugal
8 points		
7 points		Denmark; Ireland
6 points		Latvia
5 points		Georgia; Lithuania
4 points		Belarus; Czech Republic; Serbia; Sweden
3 points		Australia; Belgium; Netherlands; Spain; United Kingdom
2 points		Germany; Moldova
1 point		Armenia; Croatia; France; Italy; Montenegro; Romania

==== Points awarded by Austria ====
Points awarded by Austria (Semi-final 2)
Score	Televote	Jury
12 points	Hungary	Bulgaria
10 points	Croatia	Ireland
8 points	Bulgaria	Netherlands
7 points	Romania	Belarus
6 points	Serbia	Malta
5 points	Israel	Norway
4 points	Netherlands	Switzerland
3 points	Ireland	Hungary
2 points	Switzerland	Estonia
1 point	Belarus	Croatia

Points awarded by Austria (Final)
Score	Televote	Jury
12 points	Portugal	Netherlands
10 points	Romania	Bulgaria
8 points	Belgium	Portugal
7 points	Bulgaria	Belarus
6 points	Italy	Italy
5 points	Hungary	Hungary
4 points	Croatia	Sweden
3 points	Moldova	Norway
2 points	Poland	Belgium
1 point	Sweden	United Kingdom

==== Detailed voting results ====
The following members comprised the Austrian jury:

- Andreas Zahradnik (jury chairperson) – journalist
- Christian Ude – host, editor, scriptwriter, journalist
- Eleonora Vardanian (Elly V) – singer
- Sasha Saedi – labelhead domestic Austria, artist, repertoire manager
- Zoë Straub – singer, songwriter, actress, represented Austria in the 2016 contest

The fifth member of the jury, Sasha Saedi, was confirmed on 9 May 2017.

Detailed voting results from Austria (Semi-final 2)
R/O	Country	Jury							Televote	
R/O	Country	C. Ude	A. Zahradnik	Elly V	S. Saedi	Z. Straub	Rank	Points	Rank	Points
01	Serbia	12	11	15	15	7	13		5	6
02	Austria									
03	Macedonia	16	17	16	16	17	17		12	
04	Malta	10	3	13	8	2	5	6	16	
05	Romania	8	5	17	17	14	14		4	7
06	Netherlands	1	10	7	2	1	3	8	7	4
07	Hungary	13	4	6	6	10	8	3	1	12
08	Denmark	14	8	9	5	12	11		15	
09	Ireland	3	2	2	9	4	2	10	8	3
10	San Marino	15	14	11	11	16	16		14	
11	Croatia	6	9	10	10	11	10	1	2	10
12	Norway	11	15	3	3	5	6	5	11	
13	Switzerland	5	7	5	13	8	7	4	9	2
14	Belarus	7	13	4	4	6	4	7	10	1
15	Bulgaria	4	1	1	1	3	1	12	3	8
16	Lithuania	17	16	8	12	13	15		17	
17	Estonia	2	6	14	14	9	9	2	13	
18	Israel	9	12	12	7	15	12		6	5

Detailed voting results from Austria (Final)
R/O	Country	Jury							Televote	
R/O	Country	C. Ude	A. Zahradnik	Elly V	S. Saedi	Z. Straub	Rank	Points	Rank	Points
01	Israel	21	24	24	23	25	25		17	
02	Poland	6	12	19	15	16	12		9	2
03	Belarus	16	7	3	5	4	4	7	19	
04	Austria									
05	Armenia	19	25	12	12	13	19		21	
06	Netherlands	1	3	5	3	3	1	12	11	
07	Moldova	20	22	8	8	12	14		8	3
08	Hungary	17	4	6	9	11	6	5	6	5
09	Italy	2	2	11	4	18	5	6	5	6
10	Denmark	24	21	22	13	23	23		24	
11	Portugal	3	23	1	1	1	3	8	1	12
12	Azerbaijan	15	20	9	20	20	21		23	
13	Croatia	7	6	18	19	21	15		7	4
14	Australia	12	19	7	11	9	11		18	
15	Greece	14	18	21	10	19	20		22	
16	Spain	25	17	23	24	24	24		25	
17	Norway	18	16	4	7	7	8	3	13	
18	United Kingdom	9	8	14	16	8	10	1	16	
19	Cyprus	22	15	20	18	22	22		15	
20	Romania	8	5	25	17	17	16		2	10
21	Germany	11	10	17	22	14	17		14	
22	Ukraine	23	14	13	14	15	18		20	
23	Belgium	4	9	10	25	5	9	2	3	8
24	Sweden	10	11	15	2	10	7	4	10	1
25	Bulgaria	5	1	2	6	2	2	10	4	7
26	France	13	13	16	21	6	13		12	
