= Ne si za men =

Single by Kristian Kostov
- Released: 7 October 2016
- Recorded: 2016
- Genre: Pop
- Length: 3:47
- Label: Virginia Records
- Songwriter(s): Ray Hedges, Isaac Evans, Nigel Butler

Kristian Kostov singles chronology
"Ready to Fly" (2015)	"Ne si za men" (2016)	"Vdigam Level" (2016)

"Ne si za men" (transl. You're not for me) is a song performed by Bulgarian-Russian singer Kristian Kostov. The song was released in Bulgaria as a digital download single on 7 October 2016 through the Bulgarian label Virginia Records. On 13 January 2017, he released an English version of the song called "You Got Me Girl".

== Music video ==
A music video to accompany the release of "Ne si za men" was first released onto YouTube on 7 October 2016 at a total length of four minutes and seventeen seconds. The music video for the English version was released onto YouTube on 13 January 2017.

== Track listing ==
Digital download
No.	Title	Length
1.	"Ne si za men"	3:47

Digital download
No.	Title	Length
1.	"You Got Me Girl"	3:47

Digital download
No.	Title	Length
1.	"Ty moy ogon (English: You are my fire)"	3:47

== Release history ==
Region	Date	Version	Format	Label
Bulgaria	7 October 2016	Single (Bulgarian)	Digital download	Virginia Records
Worldwide	13 January 2017	Single (English)	Digital download	Virginia Records
