= Running on Air (song) =

2017 song by Nathan Trent

Single by Nathan Trent
- Released: 26 February 2017
- Genre: Pop
- Length: 2:48
- Label: ORF-Enterprise Musikverlag
- Songwriters: Nathan Trent; Bernhard Penzias

Nathan Trent singles chronology
"Like It Is" (2016)	"Running on Air" (2017)	"Good Vibes" (2017)

Eurovision Song Contest 2017 entry
- Country: Austria
- Artist: Nathan Trent
- Language: English
- Composers: Nathan Trent; Bernhard Penzias
- Lyricists: Nathan Trent; Bernhard Penzias

Finals performance
- Semi-final result: 7th
- Semi-final points: 147
- Final result: 16th
- Final points: 93

Entry chronology
- ◄ "Loin d'ici" (2016)
- "Nobody But You" (2018) ►

"Running on Air" is a song written and performed by Austrian singer Nathan Trent. The song was intended to be released on 28 February 2017, but leaked online through Spotify and YouTube on 26 February. It represented Austria in the Eurovision Song Contest 2017.

Trent recorded an Italian version of the song titled "Fino A Che Volerò" and a remixed Spanish version titled "Aire", which was produced by Vincent Bueno.

== Eurovision Song Contest ==
On 19 December 2016, Trent was announced as the Austrian representative to the Eurovision Song Contest 2017. As he was previously announced as a shortlisted contestant in the German national final, Unser Song 2017, he was forced to withdraw in order to accept the offer to be the Austrian representative. On 26 February 2017, it was confirmed that he'd be singing "Running on Air" at the Eurovision Song Contest. While its release date was given as 28 February, the song leaked online through Spotify and YouTube the same day as its announcement. Austria competed in the first half of the second semi-final at the Eurovision Song Contest.

Despite taking 93 points from the juries, it received none from the public televote, reaching 16th place overall.

== Track listing ==
Digital download
No.	Title	Length
1.	"Running on Air"	2:48

Martin Van Lectro Remix
No.	Title	Length
1.	"Running on Air" (Martin Van Lectro Remix)	3:27

Topanga Rework Remix
No.	Title	Length
1.	"Running on Air" (Topanga Rework Remix)	3:13

== Charts ==
Chart (2017)	Peak position
Austria (Ö3 Austria Top 40)	18
Netherlands (Dutch Single Tip)	28
Sweden Heatseeker (Sverigetopplistan)	4

== Release history ==
Region	Date	Format	Label
Worldwide	26 February 2017	Digital download	ORF-Enterprise
