= Kristian Kostov =

Bulgarian-Russian singer (born 2000)

Kristian Kostov Кристиан Костов
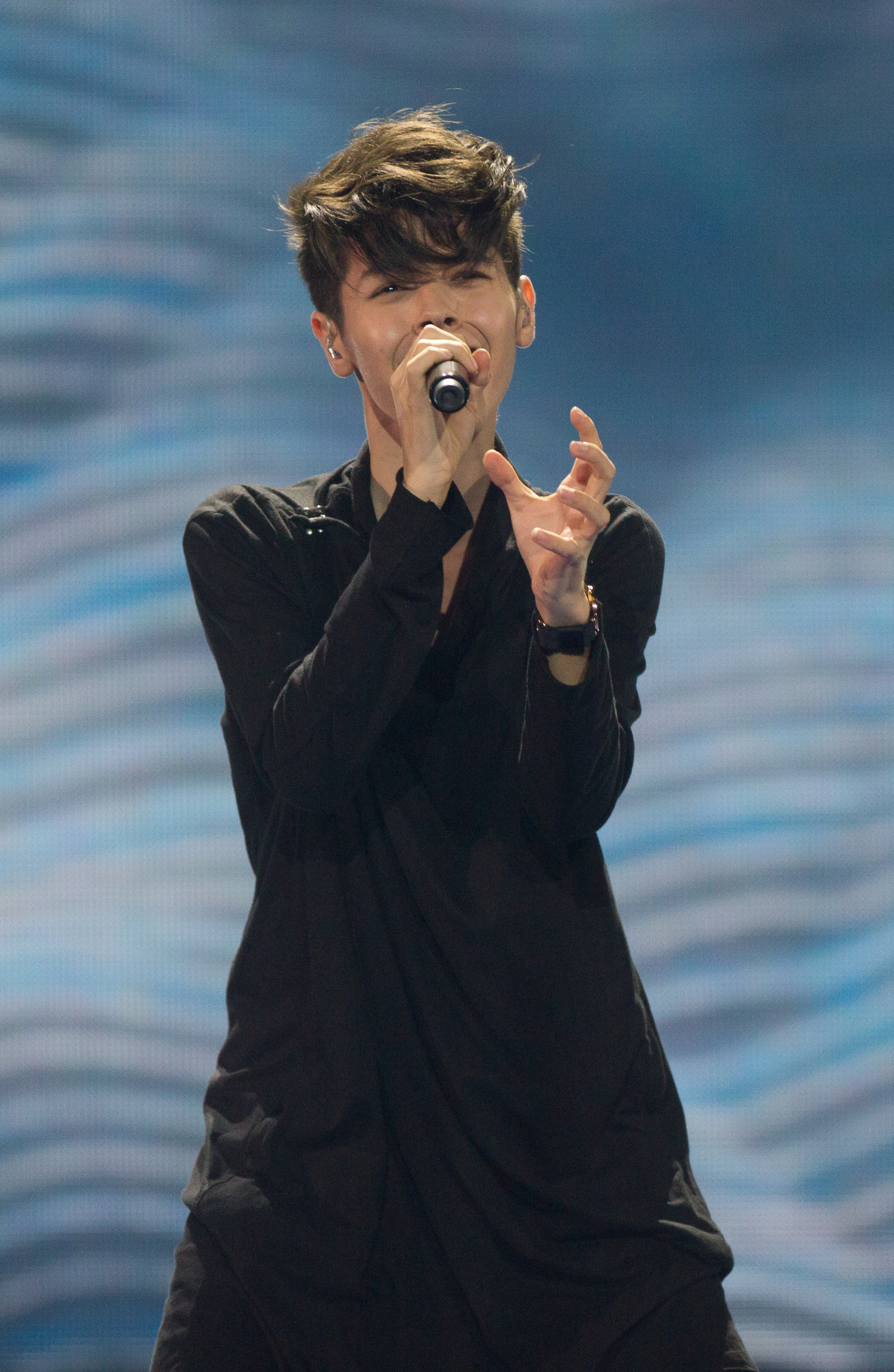
- Kostov in 2017

Background information
- Born: Kristian Konstantinov Kostov; 15 March 2000 (age 26); Moscow, Russia
- Origin: Bulgaria; Kazakhstan
- Genres: Pop; acoustic; soul
- Occupations: Singer; songwriter; musician; actor; model
- Instruments: Vocals; guitar; piano
- Years active: 2014–present
- Labels: Holistic Monkeys; Xuman; Symphonix; Universal; Virginia

Kristian Konstantinov Kostov (Bulgarian: Кристиан Константинов Костов; born 15 March 2000) is a Bulgarian-Kazakh singer. He was a finalist in season one of The Voice Kids Russia and a runner-up in the fourth season of X Factor Bulgaria. He represented Bulgaria in the Eurovision Song Contest 2017 with the song "Beautiful Mess", finishing in second place. In January 2018, Kostov won the EBBA Public Choice award. In January 2019, he was one of seven singers who performed in the seventh season of Singer (previously I Am a Singer).

== Personal life ==
Kostov was born in Moscow to a Kazakh mother and a Bulgarian father. He has an older brother, Daniel, and a younger sister, Sofia. As a child, he learned Bulgarian from his father, English from his brother, and Kazakh from his grandfather.

On 5 May 2019, he witnessed the Aeroflot Flight 1492 accident at Sheremetyevo International Airport, Moscow, Russia.

== Career ==
=== 2014–2016: The Voice Kids Russia & X Factor Bulgaria ===
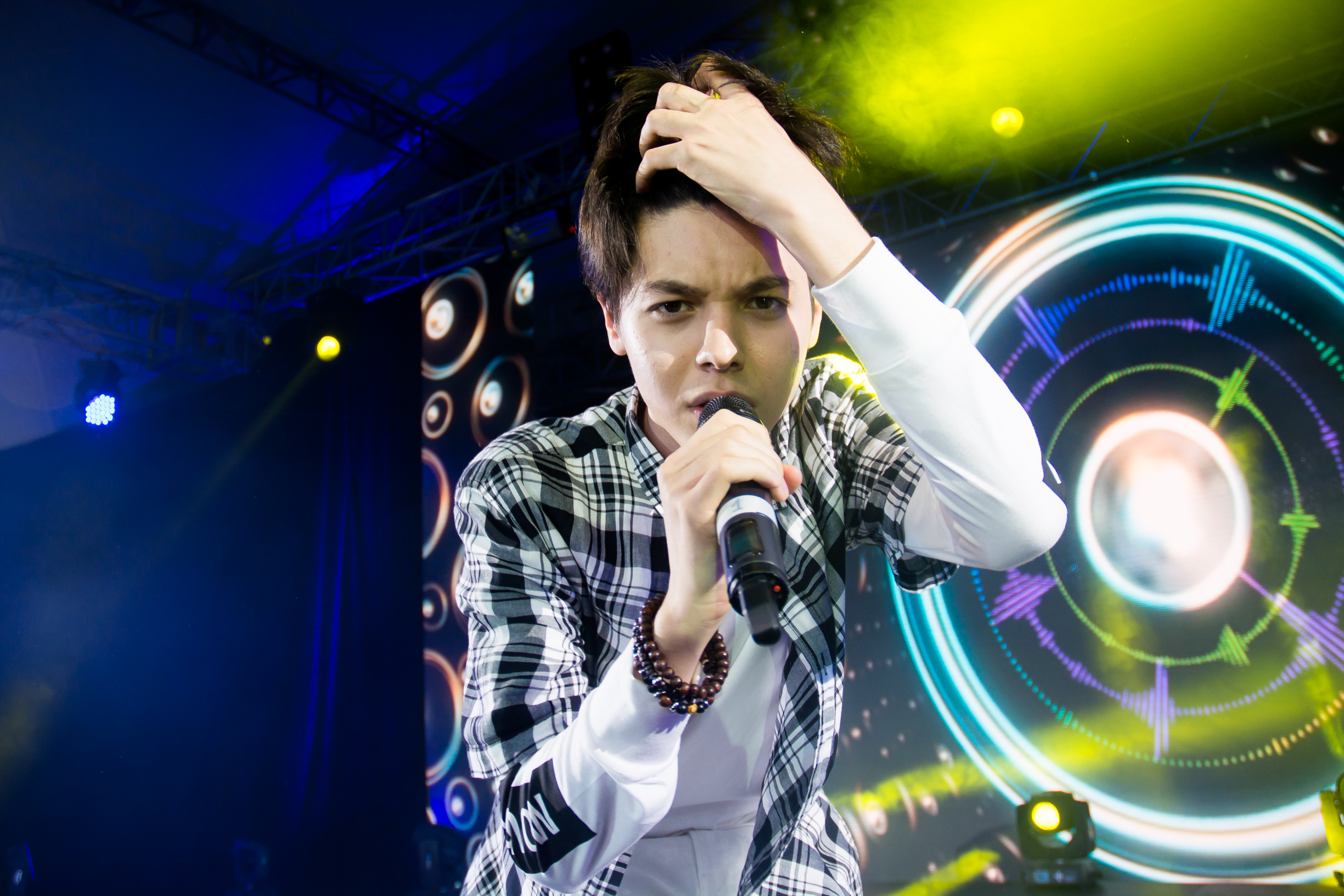
Kostov in 2016

Kostov participated in the Russian version of The Voice. He was part of the first season of the kids version of the show where his mentor was Dima Bilan, who chose Kostov to advance to the finals. After his success in Russia, Kristian auditioned for the fourth season of X Factor Bulgaria as he is of Bulgarian origin. He was selected as one of the three male contestants who advanced to the live shows and became one of the finalists. During the finals, he performed the Lyube's song "Позови меня" solo, a duet with Vasil Naydenov for "Сбогом, Моя Любов", and Emil Dimitrov's song "Ако си Дал" as his winning song on the second night. When the final results were revealed, he was runner-up.

The X Factor performances and results
Episode	Theme	Song	Result
First audition	Free choice	"When I Was Your Man"	Through to bootcamp
Bootcamp	Group performance	"Chandelier"	Through to Judge's houses
Judges' houses	Free choice	"If I Ain't Got You"	Through to live shows
Live show 1	Number one's	"Thinking Out Loud"	Safe
Live show 2	Halloween	"Take Me to Church"	Safe
Live show 3	First love	"I'm Not The Only One"	Safe
Live show 4	Bulgarian hits	"Невидим"	Safe
Live show 5	Movie Soundtracks	"Wild Wild West"	Safe
Live show 6	Divas and Heroes	"Болката отляво"	Safe
Live show 7	Disco hits	"Treasure"	Safe
Live show 8	International hits	"Позови меня"	Safe
Christmas show	Christmas edition	"Mistletoe"	No eliminations
Live show 9	Love is everything	"Story of My Life"	Safe
Live show 9	Love is everything	"Крадена любов" (with Darina Yotova)	Safe
Live show 10	Tears and laughs	"I See Fire"	Safe
Live show 10	Tears and laughs	"The Lazy Song"	Safe
Semi-final	One old and one new song	"Yesterday"	Bottom two
Semi-final	One old and one new song	"Sorry"	Bottom two
Semi-final	Final showdown	"Jealous"	Saved by majority vote
Final	One solo and one duet song	"Позови меня"	Runner-up
Final	One solo and one duet song	"Сбогом, моя любов" (with Vasil Naydenov)	Runner-up
Final	Songs of the series	"Ако си дал"	Runner-up

=== 2016–2018: Virginia Records, debut single and Eurovision ===
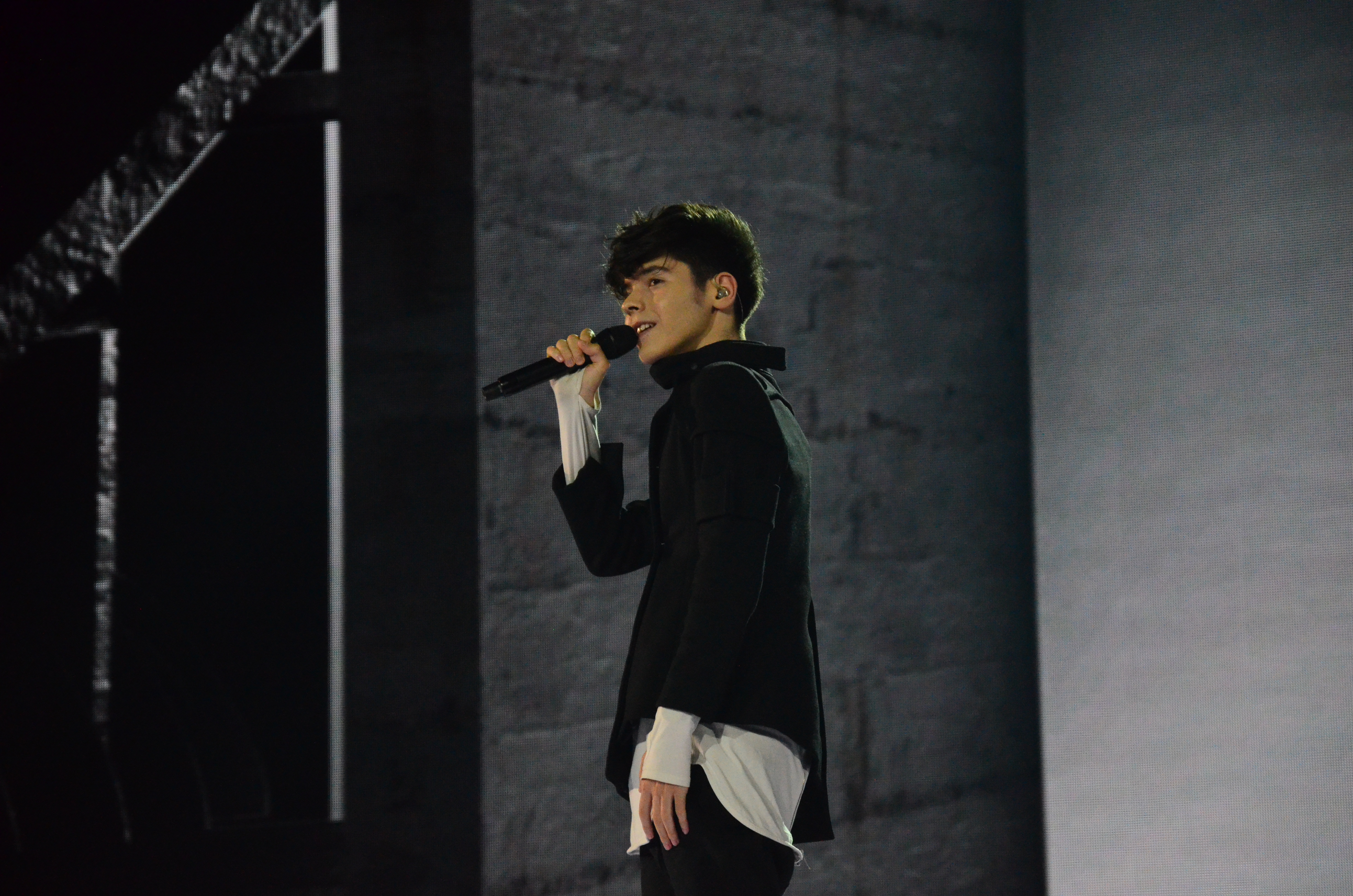
Kostov during one of rehearsals for the Eurovision Song Contest 2017

On 7 October 2016, his debut single "Ne si za men" was released by Virginia Records. The song peaked at number 13 on the Bulgarian Singles Chart. He featured on Pavell and Venci Venc's single "Vdigam Level", which was released on 25 November 2016, and peaked to number 13 on the Bulgarian Singles Chart. On 13 March 2017, it was announced that he would represent Bulgaria in the Eurovision Song Contest 2017 with the song "Beautiful Mess". He finished in second place.

=== 2019–present: Singer ===
On 11 January 2019, Kostov was revealed as the last of the seven first-round performers competing on the seventh season of China's long-running singing competition, Singer, whose cast consisted of veteran Chinese singers Liu Huan, Chyi Yu, Yang Kun, Wu Tsing-fong, Zhang Xin, and Escape Plan. Kostov was also the youngest contestant in Singer's history at 18.

Singer 2019 performances and results
Episode	Song	Original Singer	Percentage	Rank	Result
Round 1 Qualifier	"Beautiful Mess"	Kristian Kostov	14.34%	4th	Safe (5th overall, with 12.42% combined)
Round 1 Knockout	"Hello"	Adele	10.50%	5th	Safe (5th overall, with 12.42% combined)
Round 1 Challenge	"Crazy" / "Don't"	Gnarls Barkley / Ed Sheeran	10.69%	6th	Safe
Round 2 Qualifier	"Remember"	A-Mei	13.795%	4th	Safe (4th overall, with 12.96% combined)
Round 2 Knockout	"In My Blood" / "Stitches"	Shawn Mendes	12.125%	5th	Safe (4th overall, with 12.96% combined)
Round 2 Challenge	"Spoiled Innocence"	Yoga Lin	6.205%	7th	Eliminated
Round 3 Qualifier	"I See Fire"	Ed Sheeran	—N/a		Return Performance
Breakouts	"Get It" / "Rift"	Kristian Kostov	6.28%	7th	Breakout Failure

He appeared as an interval act on the night of the grand final of the Eurovision Song Contest 2026 in Vienna, Austria.

== Discography ==
=== Extended plays ===
Title	Details
Shower Thoughts	Released: 10 August 2018; Label: Symphonix; Formats: Digital download
Prologue	Released: 15 March 2019; Label: Universal Music; Formats: Digital download
Mood:	Released: 10 July 2020; Label: Polydor Records; Formats: Digital download

=== Singles ===
==== As lead artist ====
Title	Year	Peak chart positions						Album
Title	Year	AUT	FRA	NLD	SCO	SWE	SWI	Album
"Ne si za men" / "You Got Me Girl"	2016	—	—	—	—	—	—	Non-album singles
"Beautiful Mess"	2017	60	160	91	75	51	85	Non-album singles
"Слушай дождь"	2017	—	—	—	—	—	—	Non-album singles
"Глубина" (Depth)	2017	—	—	—	—	—	—	Non-album singles
"Ты Мой Огонь" (You Are My Fire)	—	—	—	—	—	—		Non-album singles
"The One (I Need You)"	2018	—	—	—	—	—	—	Non-album singles
"Burning Bridges" (with Jowst)	2018	—	—	—	—	—	—	Non-album singles
"Get It"	2018	—	—	—	—	—	—	Shower Thoughts
"Honest"	2020	—	—	—	—	—	—	Mood:
"Better"	2020	—	—	—	—	—	—	Mood:
"Things I Like"	2020	—	—	—	—	—	—	Mood:
"Thinking"	2020	—	—	—	—	—	—	Mood:
"Depressed On Wednesday"	2020	—	—	—	—	—	—	Mood:
"Take Me Back"	2020	—	—	—	—	—	—	Mood:
"Psycho" (as VOSTOK)	2020	—	—	—	—	—	—	Time
"Welcome To The Show" (as VOSTOK)	2020	—	—	—	—	—	—	Time
"Time" (as VOSTOK)	2020	—	—	—	—	—	—	Time
"2020" (as VOSTOK)	2020	—	—	—	—	—	—	Time
"Built Different"	2021	—	—	—	—	—	—	Non-album singles
"Alice" (as VOSTOK)	2021	—	—	—	—	—	—	Non-album singles
"Intentional"	2022	—	—	—	—	—	—	Mine
"Iris" (as VOSTOK)	2023	—	—	—	—	—	—	Mine
"Mine"	2023	—	—	—	—	—	—	Mine
"—" denotes a single that did not chart or was not released.

==== As featured artist ====
Title	Year	Album
"Ready to Fly" (MaxiGroove & Kristian Kostov)	2015	Non-album single
"Vdigam Level" (Pavell & Venci Venc' featuring Kristian Kostov)	2016	SeTaaBrat
"Live It Up" (B-OK featuring Roxie and Kristian Kostov)	2019	Non-album single
"Sorry" (Tra$h featuring YKEY and Kristian Kostov)	2023	Non-album single
"—" denotes a single that did not chart or was not released.

==== Other collaborations ====
Title	Year	Peak chart positions	Album
Title	Year	CIS	Album
"Mir bez voyny" (Deti Zemli featuring Open Kids, Respublika Kids, Sofia Tarasova, etc.)	2014	313	Non-album singles
"We Rock to Chengdu" (Han Geng featuring NICHKHUN, Park Boram and Kristian Kostov)	2021	-	Non-album singles

== Awards and nominations ==
=== Berlin Music Video Awards ===
The Berlin Music Video Awards is an international festival that promotes the art of music videos.

Year	Nominated work	Award	Result	Ref.
2026	"I AM YOU"	Best Cinematography	Nominated	

Awards and achievements
Preceded by Poli Genova with "If Love Was a Crime"	Bulgaria in the Eurovision Song Contest; 2017	Succeeded by Equinox with "Bones"
