= Poli Genova =

Bulgarian pop singer

Poli Genova Поли Генова
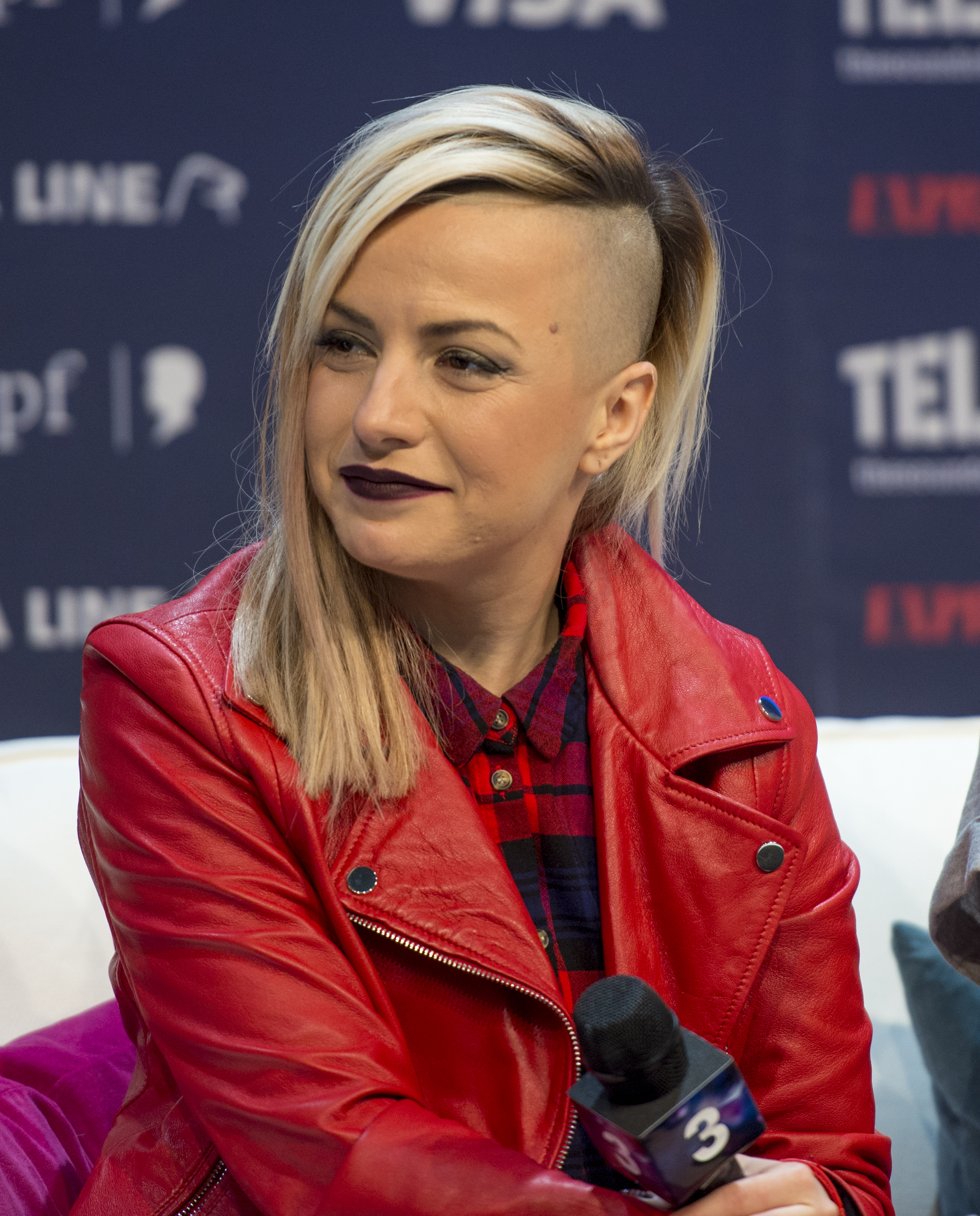
- Genova in 2016

Background information
- Born: Poli Plamenova Genova; 10 February 1987 (age 39); Sofia, Bulgaria
- Genres: Pop, Electropop, Pop Rock, Soul, R&B
- Occupations: Singer; songwriter; actress; television presenter
- Years active: 1991–present
- Labels: Virginia Records; Cat Music; Universal; Ultra; Sony

Poli Plamenova Genova (Bulgarian: Поли Пламенова Генова; born 10 February 1987) is a Bulgarian singer, songwriter, actress, and television presenter. Genova began her career in 1991, at the age of four, as a member of the Bulgarian children's ensemble Bon-Bon.

Genova later went on to represent Bulgaria in the Eurovision Song Contest 2011 with the song "Na inat", which did not qualify for the final. She returned to Eurovision five years later in 2016, for the second time representing Bulgaria with the song "If Love Was a Crime". She brought Bulgaria to the final for the first time since 2007, placing fourth, which at the time was Bulgaria's highest placing ever. As of 2026, Genova is Bulgaria's third highest placing participant.

Outside of performing, Genova has also appeared as a coach or mentor on The Voice of Bulgaria and X Factor Bulgaria, voiced the Bulgarian version of Judy Hopps in the film Zootopia, and hosted the Junior Eurovision Song Contest 2015 in Sofia. She has two children.

== Life and career ==
=== Early life and work with Bon-Bon ===
Genova was born on 10 February 1987 in Sofia. After beginning her music career in 1991, Genova became the first member of the Bulgarian children's ensemble Bon-Bon in 1996. As a member of the group, Genova also hosted the eponymous children's show. With Bon-Bon, she performed with Bulgarian singers such as Georgi Hristov, Yordanka Hristova, and Neli Rangelova. She was awarded a special award by Bulgarian National Television at the Golden Orpheus Festival for her duet with Rangelova. In 1997, Bon-Bon took part in the Slavianski Bazaar festival in Vitebsk. She later left Bon-Bon in 2001.

Genova graduated from the Lyubomir Pipkov National School of Music, where she studied clarinet, and later attended the Krastyo Sarafov National Academy for Theatre and Film Arts. Genova was part of the UNICEF charity project The Magnificent Six.

=== 2009–2015: Eurovision 2011 and X Factor Bulgaria ===
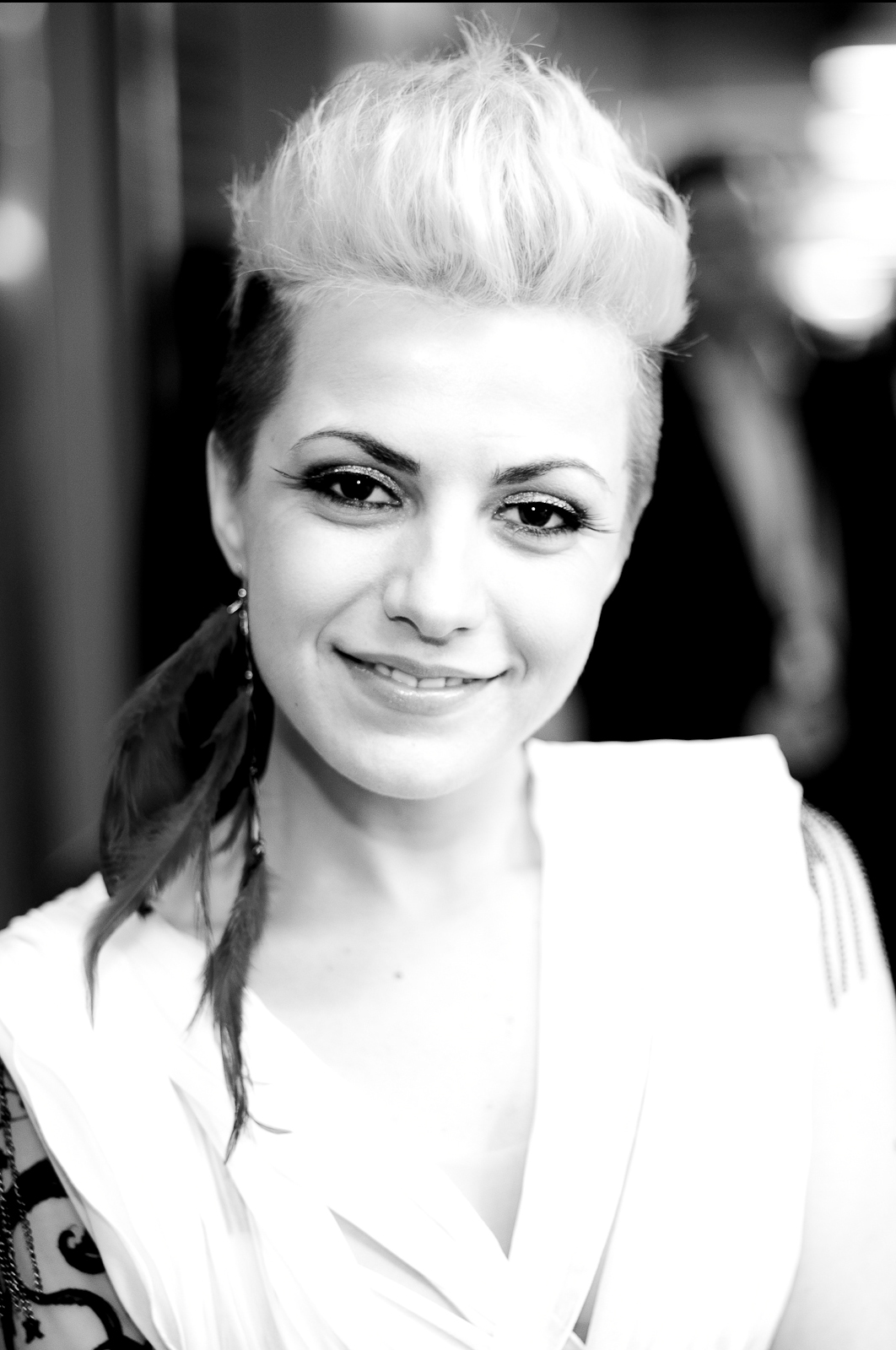
Genova in 2011

Genova was one of the finalists of the Bulgarian national selection for the Eurovision Song Contest 2009 with the song "One Lifetime Is Not Enough". The song placed second, behind Krassimir Avramov and his song "Illusion".

She later returned to the Bulgarian national selection in 2011 with the song "Na inat". She went on to win the competition, and earned the right to represent Bulgaria in the Eurovision Song Contest 2011. The song went on to not qualify for the final, placing 12th in the second semi-final. Following the Eurovision Song Contest, Genova became a mentor on season one of X Factor Bulgaria. She released the album 1, 2, 3 in 2014.

=== 2016–present: Eurovision 2016, further success, and The Voice of Bulgaria ===
On 21 October 2015, it was announced that Genova would be hosting the Junior Eurovision Song Contest 2015 in Sofia.

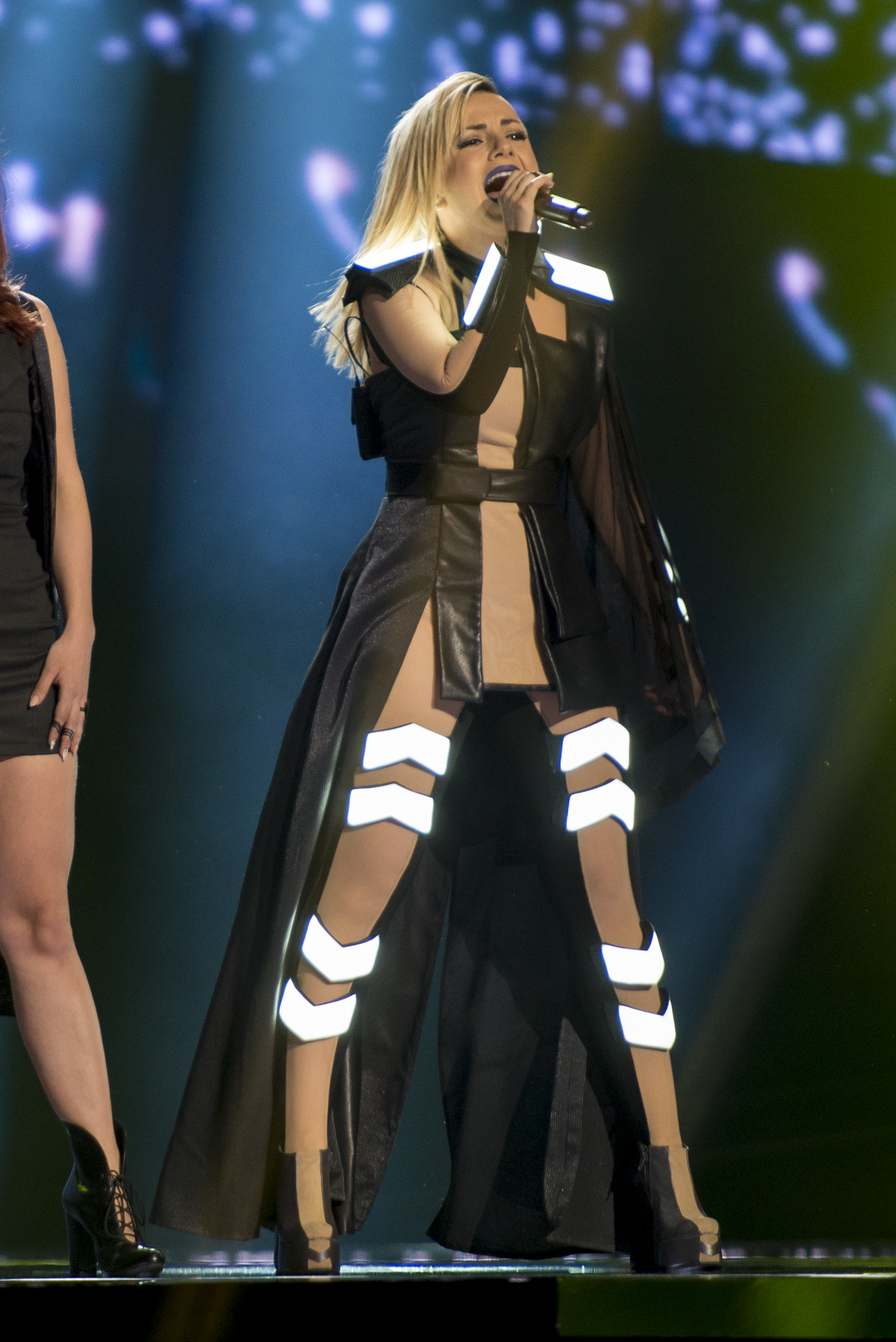
Genova performing during the Eurovision Song Contest 2016.

Later, on 19 February 2016, the Bulgarian National Television internally selected her to once again represent Bulgaria in the Eurovision Song Contest, with the song "If Love Was a Crime". Theodosii Spassov, a Bulgarian jazz musician who plays kaval contributed to the song, in addition to composers Sebastian Arman, Boris Milanov, and Joacim "Twin" Persson. The track received many positive reviews from Eurovision websites such as Wiwibloggs. The song was performed live during the pre-Eurovision parties in Riga, Amsterdam, Tel Aviv, and London. Genova went on to become the first Bulgarian entrant to qualify for the final since Elitsa & Stoyan in the Eurovision Song Contest 2007, and she later went on to place fourth in the final, which was at the time Bulgaria's highest finish ever. The track charted on iTunes in 26 countries, five million times through Spotify.

Following Eurovision, Genova performed a show in front of 12,000 people in Arena Armeec, one of the most renown indoor arenas in Bulgaria. She also performed "If Love Was a Crime" at the BG Radio Music Awards 2016, where she was rewarded with the special statuette for BG Ambassador of the Year. On 5 June 2016, Genova performed a gig at Clapham Grand Theatre in London. Genova was a special guest at the 2016 MAD Video Music Awards in Athens, where she performed with Greek singer Demy. Genova and Destiny Chukunyere, the winner of the Junior Eurovision Song Contest 2015, were the interval acts at the Junior Eurovision Song Contest 2016 in Malta. She became a coach on The Voice of Bulgaria in 2017, when the show premiered its fourth season and remained a part of the lineup in the fifth season. She is said to be planning a third Eurovision entry.

== Personal life ==
She is married and has two children.

== Discography ==
=== Albums ===
Title	Details
1, 2, 3	Released: 2013; Label: Bon-Bon Music; Format: Digital download, CD
Твоя (Tvoya)	Released: 2020; Label: Policanto; Format: Digital download, CD
По-добрата Коледа (The Better Christmas)	Released: 2022; Label: Policanto; Format: Digital download, CD
LAST NIGHT	Released: 2023; Label: Policanto; Format: Digital download, CD

=== Singles ===
Title	Year	Peak chart positions						Album
Title	Year	BUL	AUT	FRA	SCO	SWE	UK	Album
"One Lifetime Is Not Enough"	2009	9	—	—	—	—	—	Non-album single
"Na inat"	2011	3	—	—	—	—	—	1,2,3
"1, 2, 3"	2011	—	—	—	—	—	—	1,2,3
"Dve" (Две)	2012	—	—	—	—	—	—	1,2,3
"Soleni Dni" (Солени дни)	2013	6	—	—	—	—	—	1,2,3
"Za Nas" (За нас)	2013	—	—	—	—	—	—	1,2,3
"Shot" (Шот)	2013	—	—	—	—	—	—	1,2,3
"If Love Was A Crime"	2016	1	72	129	73	47	200	Non-album single
"Sluhove" (Слухове)	2016	18	—	—	—	—	—	Твоя
"Oshte" (Още)	2017	24	—	—	—	—	—	Твоя
"Mr President" (Г-н Президент)	2018	24	—	—	—	—	—	Твоя
"Tvoya" (Твоя)	2018	—	—	—	—	—	—	Твоя
"Perfect Love"	2018	—	—	—	—	—	—	Твоя
"Geroite"	2019	36	—	—	—	—	—	Твоя
"How We End Up"	2020	1	—	—	—	—	—	Твоя
"Last Night"	2021	1	—	—	—	—	—	
"Недей да правиш така" (Don't Do That)"	2023	—	—	—	—	—	—	
"Magical"	2023	—	—	—	—	—	—	
"We Only Have Today"	2024	—	—	—	—	—	—	
"—" denotes a single that did not chart or were not released.

=== Collaborations ===
Title	Year	Album
"Заедно с теб" (Poli Genova, Wondrous, Bogomil and Orlin Pavlov)	2012	Non-album singles
"Сега или никога" (Voice account of Boys featuring Poli Genova)	2013	Non-album singles
"Нека с теб" (Ditcho and Poli Genova)	2014	Non-album singles
"Щом си с мен" (Vicki Terziyska, Poli Genova, Vesi Boneva, Vasco Chergov and Ditcho)	2014	Non-album singles
"Ей така" (Del Padre feat. Poli Genova)	2016	Non-album singles
Tragni navreme (Poli Genova x Lubo Kirov)	2022	LAST NIGHT
La Rumba (Poli Genova feat. Rodrigo Ace)	2023	LAST NIGHT

== Filmography ==
=== Music videos ===
Year	Title
2009	"One Lifetime Is Not Enough""
2011	"На инат""
2011	"1,2,3""
2012	"Две""
2012	"Заедно с теб""
2013	"Солени дни""
2013	"За нас""
2013	"Шот""
2013	"Сега или никога""
2014	"Нека с теб""
2014	"Щом си с мен""
2016	"If Love Was A Crime""
2016	"Del Padre feat. Poli Genova - Ей така""
2016	"Sluhove"
2017	"Още" / "Can You Remember Me?" (English Version)
2018	"Г-н Президент"
2018	"Твоя"
2018	"Perfect Love"

=== Movies and theatre ===
Besides being recognized as a singer, Poli is an actress, performing in her own musical theater for children based on Hans Christian Andersen's fairytale The Ugly Duckling. She also starred as The Idea in the puppet play Some can do it, Others cannot. In addition to performing in the theatre, Poli has voiced animated characters in the Bulgarian dubs of films such as:

Television
Year	Title	Role	Notes
2011	The Smurfs	Smurfette	Bulgarian dub
2013	The Smurfs 2	Smurfette	Bulgarian dub
2016	Zootopia	Judy Hopps	Bulgarian dub
2016	Pixar in Concert	Various	Bulgarian dub

Awards and achievements
Preceded by Miro with "Angel si ti"	Bulgaria in the Eurovision Song Contest; 2011	Succeeded by Sofi Marinova with "Love Unlimited"
Preceded by Elitsa Todorova & Stoyan Yankoulov with "Samo shampioni"	Bulgaria in the Eurovision Song Contest; 2016	Succeeded by Kristian Kostov with "Beautiful Mess"
Preceded by (Malta) Moira Delia	Junior Eurovision Song Contest presenters 2015	Succeeded by (Malta) Ben Camille and Valerie Vella
