= Beautiful Mess (Kristian Kostov song) =

2017 song by Kristian Kostov

Single by Kristian Kostov
- Released: 13 March 2017
- Recorded: 2016
- Genre: Electropop
- Length: 3:00
- Label: Virginia Records
- Songwriters: Borislav Milanov; Sebastian Arman; Joacim Bo Persson; Alex Omar; Alexander V. Blay
- Producers: Borislav Milanov; Sebastian Arman; Joacim Bo Persson

Kristian Kostov singles chronology
"Vdigam Level" (2016)	"Beautiful Mess" (2017)	"Glubina" (2017)

Music video
- "Beautiful Mess" on YouTube

Eurovision Song Contest 2017 entry
- Country: Bulgaria
- Artist: Kristian Kostov
- Language: English
- Composers: Borislav Milanov; Sebastian Arman; Joacim Bo Persson; Alex Omar; Alexander V. Blay
- Lyricists: Borislav Milanov; Sebastian Arman; Joacim Bo Persson; Alex Omar; Alexander V. Blay

Finals performance
- Semi-final result: 1st
- Semi-final points: 403
- Final result: 2nd
- Final points: 615

Entry chronology
- ◄ "If Love Was a Crime" (2016)
- "Bones" (2018) ►

"Beautiful Mess" is a song performed by Bulgarian-Russian-Kazakh singer Kristian Kostov. The song was released as a digital download on 13 March 2017 through Virginia Records. The song represented Bulgaria in the Eurovision Song Contest 2017 in Kyiv, Ukraine. Beautiful Mess was performed as Kostov's first song on Singer 2019.

== Eurovision Song Contest ==
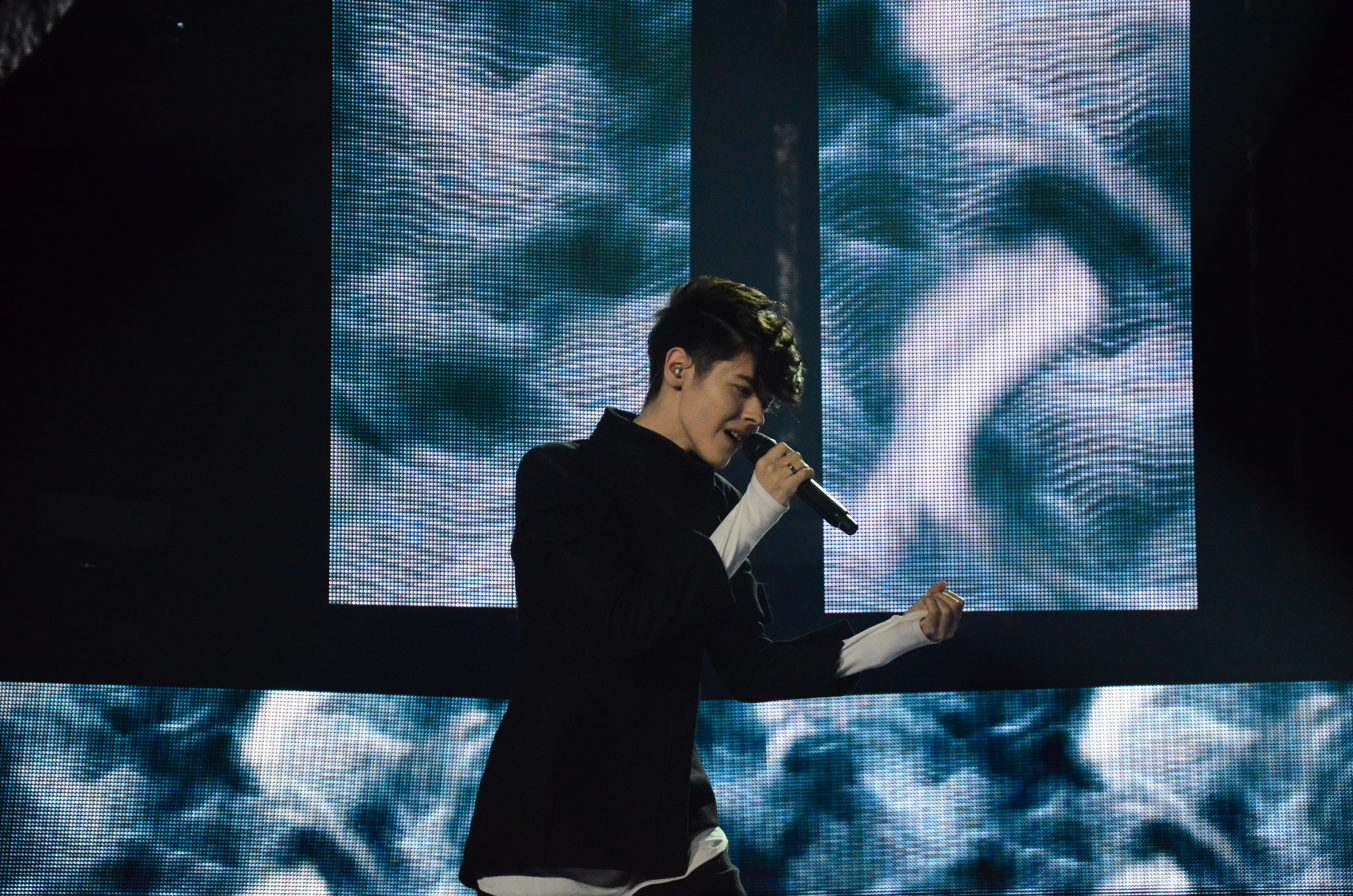
Kristian Kostov performing "Beautiful Mess" in Kyiv.

On 22 December 2016, the Bulgarian broadcaster Bulgarian National Television (BNT), made an open call for music producers and record labels to submit songs for the Bulgarian entry in the Eurovision Song Contest 2017. On 25 January 2017, it was revealed that six songs had been shortlisted, and on 7 February, it was announced that three of the songs had been further shortlisted. On 13 March, Kostov was revealed as the Bulgarian entrant, while his song, "Beautiful Mess", was revealed later that same day. Bulgaria competed in the second half of the second semi-final at the Eurovision Song Contest.

It qualified from the second semi-final and went on to place second in the grand final, held on 13 May 2017. It was the best-performing song in Bulgaria's history at the Eurovision Song Contest until the 2026 edition when Dara claimed victory with Bangaranga.

== Track listing ==
Digital download
No.	Title	Length
1.	"Beautiful Mess"	3:00

Remixes – Single
No.	Title	Length
1.	"Beautiful Mess" (Hit the Floor Remix)	4:24
2.	"Beautiful Mess" (Baron Grand Sunset Remix)	3:21

== Charts ==
Chart (2017)	Peak position
Austria (Ö3 Austria Top 40)	60
Belgium (Ultratip Bubbling Under Flanders)	32
Bulgaria Airplay (PROPHON)	2
France Downloads (SNEP)	160
Hungary (Single Top 40)	19
Netherlands (Single Top 100)	91
Russia (TopHit)	457
Scotland Singles (OCC)	75
Sweden (Sverigetopplistan)	51
Switzerland (Schweizer Hitparade)	85
UK Singles Downloads (OCC)	73

Chart (2026)	Peak position
Greece International (IFPI) Yung Nino version	71

== Release history ==
Region	Date	Format	Label
Worldwide	13 March 2017	Digital download	Virginia Records
