= If Love Was a Crime =

2016 single by Poli Genova

Single by Poli Genova
- Released: 21 March 2016
- Recorded: 2016
- Genre: Dance-pop
- Length: 2:59
- Label: BNT; Universal
- Songwriters: Composers: Borislav Milanov, Sebastian Arman, Joacim Persson, Johnny K. Palmer Lyricists: Borislav Milanov, Sebastian Arman, Joacim Persson, Poli Genova

Poli Genova singles chronology
"Щом си с мен" (2014)	"If Love Was a Crime" (2016)	"Sluhove" (2016)

Eurovision Song Contest 2016 entry
- Country: Bulgaria
- Artist: Poli Genova
- Languages: English; Bulgarian
- Composers: Borislav Milanov; Sebastian Arman; Joachim Persson; Johnny K. Palmer
- Lyricists: Borislav Milanov; Sebastian Arman; Joachim Persson; Poli Genova

Finals performance
- Semi-final result: 5th
- Semi-final points: 220
- Final result: 4th
- Final points: 307

Entry chronology
- ◄ "Samo shampioni" (2013)
- "Beautiful Mess" (2017) ►

"If Love Was a Crime" is a song recorded by Bulgarian recording artist Poli Genova. Written by Borislav Milanov, Sebastian Arman, Joacim Bo Persson, Johnny K. Palmer and Genova, the track represented Bulgaria in the Eurovision Song Contest 2016. As a result, it came in fourth place in the final, with it becoming the highest placing in the contest for Bulgaria. An accompanying music video for "If Love Was a Crime" was released on 21 March 2016, followed by the launching of the single on 30 March 2016 through the Bulgarian National Television (BNT) and Universal. Upon its appearance in the contest, the recording charted at number 200 on the UK Singles Chart and peaked within the top eighty in Austria, Belgium, Scotland and Sweden.

Despite its success, the song was removed from digital music platforms after its initial distribution deal with Universal expired. A campaign by the Pop Activism website saw a new deal struck between the rights holders BNT and distributor Universal in April 2018 with the song returning to digital music platforms.

== Eurovision Song Contest ==
On 19 February 2016, BNT announced that the broadcaster's managing board had internally selected Poli Genova to represent Bulgaria at the Eurovision Song Contest 2016. The song "If Love Was a Crime" was also internally selected for Genova and was presented to the public on 21 March 2016 through the release of the official music video via the official Eurovision Song Contest website eurovision.tv. Genova performed the song during Eurovision Song Contest 2016 second semi-final on 12 May 2016, held at the Globe Arena in Stockholm, Sweden, and qualified for the final as one of the ten countries which received the highest number of points. In the final, on 14 May 2016, after the results came through, "If Love Was a Crime" finished the contest in 4th place with 307 points. It was then Bulgaria's highest scoring entry at Eurovision; it was also the first participation for Bulgaria on the final since 2007.

== Track listing ==
Digital download
No.	Title	Length
1.	"If Love Was a Crime"	2:59

== Release history ==
Region	Date	Format	Label
Europe	30 March 2016	Digital download	BNT, Universal Music

== Chart performance ==
The track has been streamed over four million times through Spotify. Since its release, the official video has been watched almost 15 million times.

Chart (2016)	Peak position
Austria (Ö3 Austria Top 40)	72
Belgium (Ultratip Bubbling Under Flanders)	32
France (SNEP)	129
Scotland Singles (OCC)	73
Sweden (Sverigetopplistan)	47
UK Singles Downloads (OCC)	74
UK Singles (Official Charts Company)	200

== Other versions ==
"If Love Was a Crime" has also been performed by Greek singer Demy in Greek under the title "Isovia Mazi" (Ισόβια Μαζί", meaning "Life Ιmprisonment Together").
