= Bulgaria in the Eurovision Song Contest 2021 =

- Eurovision Song Contest 2021
- Participating broadcaster: Bulgarian National Television (BNT)
- Country: Bulgaria
- Selection process: Internal selection
- Announcement date: Artist: 21 March 2020; Song: 10 March 2021

Competing entry
- Song: "Growing Up Is Getting Old"
- Artist: Victoria
- Songwriters: Victoria Georgieva; Maya Nalani; Helena Larsson; Oliver Björkvall

Placement
- Semi-final result: Qualified (3rd, 250 points)
- Final result: 11th, 170 points

Participation chronology

Bulgaria was represented at the Eurovision Song Contest 2021 with the song "Growing Up Is Getting Old", written by Victoria Georgieva, Maya Nalani, Helena Larsson, and Oliver Björkvall, and performed by Georgieva herself under her stage name Victoria. The Bulgarian participating broadcaster, Bulgarian National Television (BNT), announced on 21 March 2020 that it had selected Victoria to compete at the 2021 contest, after she was due to compete in the 2020 contest with "Tears Getting Sober" before the 2020 event's cancellation. The 2021 song that Victoria competed with, "Growing Up Is Getting Old", was also internally selected and was presented to the public during a special concert on 10 March 2021.

Bulgaria was drawn to compete in the second semi-final of the Eurovision Song Contest which took place on 20 May 2021. Performing during the show in position 13, "Growing Up Is Getting Old" was announced among the top 10 entries of the second semi-final and therefore qualified to compete in the final on 22 May. It was later revealed that Bulgaria placed third out of the 17 participating countries in the semi-final with 250 points. In the final, Bulgaria performed in position 17 and placed eleventh out of the 26 participating countries, scoring 170 points.

== Background ==
Prior to the 2021 contest, Bulgarian National Television (BNT) had participated in the Eurovision Song Contest representing Bulgaria twelve times since its first entry in 2005. The nation achieved their best result in the contest in 2017 with the song "Beautiful Mess" performed by Kristian Kostov, which placed second. To this point, only four Bulgarian entries had managed to have qualified to the Eurovision final; the nation had failed to qualify to the final with their other eight entries. In 2018, "Bones" by Equinox qualified to the final and placed fourteenth.

As part of its duties as participating broadcaster, BNT organises the selection of its entry in the Eurovision Song Contest and broadcasts the event in the country. In the past, BNT had alternated between both internal selections and national finals in order to select the Bulgarian entry. In October 2018, the broadcaster announced that it would not participate in 2019 citing financial difficulties as the reason for its decision. Following its two-year absence, BNT confirmed its participation in the 2021 contest on 21 March 2020. For its 2021 entry, the broadcaster internally selected the entry, a selection procedure that was used since 2016.

== Before Eurovision ==
=== Internal selection ===
On 21 March 2020, BNT confirmed that Victoria would remain as Bulgaria's representative for the Eurovision Song Contest 2021. A songwriting camp was held in Burgas and Primorsko between 16 and 26 August 2020 in order to create potential songs for Victoria. On 29 January 2021, the broadcaster announced that Victoria's song would be selected by several focus groups, including music, radio and television industry professionals as well as international Eurovision experts, from six songs. Five of the songs came from her recently released five-song EP A Little Dramatic, while the remaining song was her most recent single "Ugly Cry". On 20 February 2021, an online platform was launched for the public to also evaluate and provide feedback about the six songs until 1 March 2021.

The selected song "Growing Up Is Getting Old" was presented on 7 March 2021 during a special concert broadcast on BNT 1 as well as online via YouTube and the broadcaster's official Eurovision Song Contest website eurovision.icard.com. In addition to the presentation of the song, guest performers were Alex Raeva, Azis, Dara, Grafa, member of 2008 German Eurovision Song Contest entrant No Angels Lucy Diakovska, Mihaela Fileva and Venci Venc'. The song was written by Maya Nalani, Helena Larsson, Oliver Björkvall as well as Victoria herself, and was selected by BNT from two shortlisted songs: "Growing Up Is Getting Old" and "Imaginary Friend".

Key: Winner Shortlisted

Song	Songwriter(s)	Result
"Dive into Unknown"	Victoria Georgieva, Lukas Oscar, Pauline Skött, Borislav Milanov, Peter St James	—N/a
"Growing Up Is Getting Old"	Victoria Georgieva, Maya Nalani, Helena Larsson, Oliver Björkvall	Winner
"Imaginary Friend"	Victoria Georgieva, Cornelia Wiebols, Irma Eriksson Wadström, Oliver Björkvall	Shortlisted
"Phantom Pain"	Helena Larsson, Victoria Georgieva, Oliver Björkvall	—N/a
"The Funeral Song"	Helena Larsson, Victoria Georgieva, Christopher Samuels, Nellie Fors, Oliver Björkvall	—N/a
"Ugly Cry"	Victoria Georgieva, Billen Ted, Martin Masarov	—N/a

== At Eurovision ==
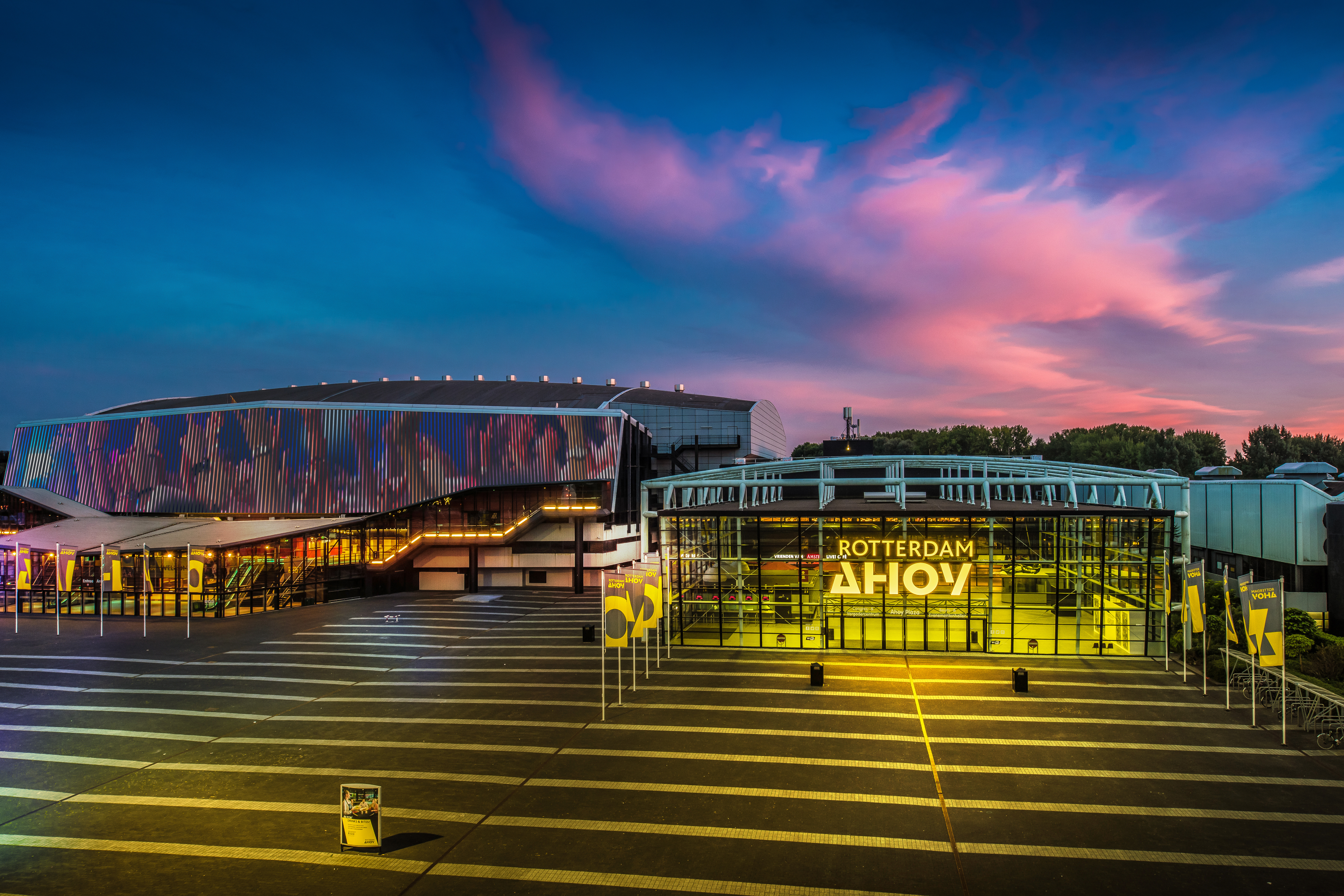
The Eurovision Song Contest 2021 took place at the Rotterdam Ahoy in Rotterdam, Netherlands

According to Eurovision rules, all nations with the exceptions of the host country and the "Big Five" (France, Germany, Italy, Spain and the United Kingdom) are required to qualify from one of two semi-finals in order to compete for the final; the top ten countries from each semi-final progress to the final. The European Broadcasting Union (EBU) split up the competing countries into six different pots based on voting patterns from previous contests, with countries with favourable voting histories put into the same pot. The semi-final allocation draw held for the Eurovision Song Contest 2020 on 28 January 2020 was used for the 2021 contest, which Bulgaria was placed into the second semi-final, to be held on 20 May 2021, and was scheduled to perform in the second half of the show.

Once all the competing songs for the 2021 contest had been released, the running order for the semi-finals was decided by the shows' producers rather than through another draw, so that similar songs were not placed next to each other. Bulgaria was set to perform in position 13, following the entry from Portugal and before the entry from Finland.

The two semi-finals and the final were broadcast in Bulgaria on BNT 1 and BNT 4 with commentary by Elena Rosberg and Georgi Kushvaliev. The Bulgarian spokesperson, who announced the top 12-point score awarded by the Bulgarian jury during the final, was Joanna Dragneva who represented Bulgaria at the 2008 contest as the lead singer of Deep Zone.

=== Semi-final ===
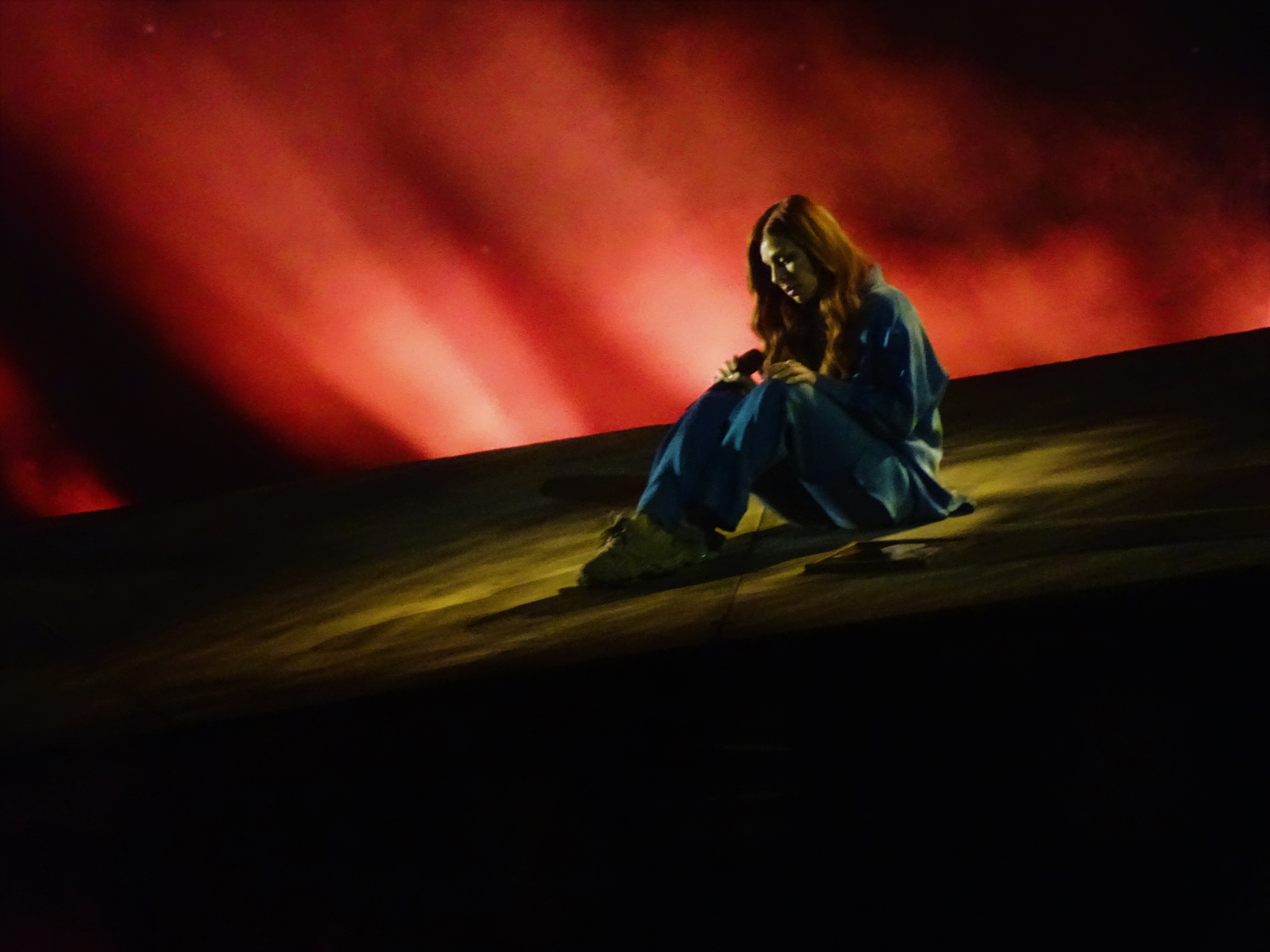
Victoria during a rehearsal before the second semi-final

Victoria took part in technical rehearsals on 11 and 14 May, followed by dress rehearsals on 19 and 20 May. This included the jury show on 19 May where the professional juries of each country watched and voted on the competing entries.

The Bulgarian performance featured Victoria performing on a rotating platform in a blue jacket and pants. The LED stage floor displayed water and Victoria stroked a picture of her and her father from her childhood during the song. The performance also featured smoke and an hourglass effect, which a stream of sand was poured in onto the stage with Victoria reaching and touching it. The stage concept of the Bulgarian performance was developed by Austrian director Marvin Dietmann. An off-stage backing vocalist also joined Victoria: the co-composer of "Growing Up Is Getting Old" Maya Nalani.

At the end of the show, Bulgaria was announced as having finished in the top 10 and subsequently qualifying for the grand final. It was later revealed that Bulgaria placed third in the semi-final, receiving a total of 250 points: 101 points from the televoting and 149 points from the juries.

=== Final ===
Shortly after the second semi-final, a winners' press conference was held for the ten qualifying countries. As part of this press conference, the qualifying artists took part in a draw to determine which half of the grand final they would subsequently participate in. This draw was done in the order the countries were announced during the semi-final. Bulgaria was drawn to compete in the second half. Following this draw, the shows' producers decided upon the running order of the final, as they had done for the semi-finals. Bulgaria was subsequently placed to perform in position 17, following the entry from Finland and before the entry from Lithuania.

Victoria once again took part in dress rehearsals on 21 and 22 May before the final, including the jury final where the professional juries cast their final votes before the live show. Victoria performed a repeat of her semi-final performance during the final on 22 May. Bulgaria placed eleventh in the final, scoring 170 points: 30 points from the televoting and 140 points from the juries.

=== Voting ===
Voting during the three shows involved each country awarding two sets of points from 1-8, 10 and 12: one from their professional jury and the other from televoting. Each nation's jury consisted of five music industry professionals who are citizens of the country they represent, with a diversity in gender and age represented. The judges assess each entry based on the performances during the second Dress Rehearsal of each show, which takes place the night before each live show, against a set of criteria including: vocal capacity; the stage performance; the song's composition and originality; and the overall impression by the act. Jury members may only take part in panel once every three years, and are obliged to confirm that they are not connected to any of the participating acts in a way that would impact their ability to vote impartially. Jury members should also vote independently, with no discussion of their vote permitted with other jury members. The exact composition of the professional jury, and the results of each country's jury and televoting were released after the grand final; the individual results from each jury member were also released in an anonymised form.

Below is a breakdown of points awarded to Bulgaria and awarded by Bulgaria in the second semi-final and grand final of the contest, and the breakdown of the jury voting and televoting conducted during the two shows:

==== Points awarded to Bulgaria ====
Points awarded to Bulgaria (Semi-final 2)
Score	Televote	Jury
12 points		Finland; Moldova; Portugal; Switzerland
10 points	Spain; United Kingdom	Estonia; Iceland; Serbia
8 points	Albania; Georgia	Austria; Georgia; Greece
7 points		Czech Republic; United Kingdom
6 points	Czech Republic; Greece; Serbia	Denmark; Latvia
5 points	Denmark; France; Moldova; Portugal	Poland; San Marino; Spain
4 points	Austria; Finland; Iceland; Poland; San Marino	France
3 points	Switzerland	
2 points	Estonia; Latvia	Albania
1 point		

Points awarded to Bulgaria (Final)
Score	Televote	Jury
12 points		Moldova; Portugal
10 points		Finland; Switzerland
8 points	Spain; United Kingdom	Greece; Iceland
7 points	Cyprus	
6 points		Belgium; Denmark; Estonia; Norway; Russia; Serbia
5 points	Albania	Austria; Cyprus; Latvia; United Kingdom
4 points		Czech Republic; Georgia; Spain
3 points		San Marino
2 points	San Marino	Australia; Lithuania; Romania
1 point		Azerbaijan; Ireland; Israel

==== Points awarded by Bulgaria ====
Points awarded by Bulgaria (Semi-final 2)
Score	Televote	Jury
12 points	Finland	Moldova
10 points	Serbia	Greece
8 points	Greece	Portugal
7 points	Switzerland	Estonia
6 points	Iceland	Austria
5 points	Portugal	Czech Republic
4 points	Albania	Albania
3 points	Denmark	Poland
2 points	Georgia	San Marino
1 point	Estonia	Georgia

Points awarded by Bulgaria (Final)
Score	Televote	Jury
12 points	Italy	Moldova
10 points	France	Italy
8 points	Finland	Greece
7 points	Russia	France
6 points	Ukraine	Portugal
5 points	Serbia	Malta
4 points	Azerbaijan	Spain
3 points	Switzerland	Israel
2 points	Greece	Netherlands
1 point	Sweden	Finland

==== Detailed voting results ====
The following members comprised the Bulgarian jury:

- Tedy Katzarova (jury member in semi-final 2) – singer, songwriter
- Katya Mihaylova – singer
- Milka Miteva (jury member in the final) – musician, pianist, lecturer at the New Bulgarian University, headmaster of "L. Pipkov" National Musical School
- Krassimir Gyulmezov – singer
- Etien Levi (jury chairperson) – singer, vocal coach
- Christina Mateeva – producer and editor of music programs and shows at BNT

Detailed voting results from Bulgaria (Semi-final 2)
R/O	Country	Jury							Televote	
R/O	Country	Juror A	Juror B	Juror C	Juror D	Juror E	Rank	Points	Rank	Points
01	San Marino	10	12	7	7	9	9	2	11	
02	Estonia	5	8	4	5	4	4	7	10	1
03	Czech Republic	13	4	10	9	5	6	5	14	
04	Greece	2	2	2	2	2	2	10	3	8
05	Austria	4	5	5	6	6	5	6	12	
06	Poland	6	6	8	8	15	8	3	15	
07	Moldova	1	1	1	1	1	1	12	16	
08	Iceland	15	14	16	16	12	16		5	6
09	Serbia	14	13	9	10	10	13		2	10
10	Georgia	12	3	14	14	16	10	1	9	2
11	Albania	7	9	11	4	8	7	4	7	4
12	Portugal	3	10	3	3	3	3	8	6	5
13	Bulgaria									
14	Finland	8	16	12	13	7	12		1	12
15	Latvia	16	7	13	11	14	14		13	
16	Switzerland	11	15	15	15	13	15		4	7
17	Denmark	9	11	6	12	11	11		8	3

Detailed voting results from Bulgaria (Final)
R/O	Country	Jury							Televote	
R/O	Country	Juror A	Juror B	Juror C	Juror D	Juror E	Rank	Points	Rank	Points
01	Cyprus	12	22	19	10	12	16		13	
02	Albania	23	21	15	14	25	23		19	
03	Israel	13	10	9	2	13	8	3	14	
04	Belgium	3	20	20	24	23	12		21	
05	Russia	22	9	11	25	19	17		4	7
06	Malta	9	8	4	4	4	6	5	20	
07	Portugal	10	7	6	5	2	5	6	18	
08	Serbia	24	24	21	11	14	21		6	5
09	United Kingdom	11	6	23	12	21	14		25	
10	Greece	2	2	10	3	5	3	8	9	2
11	Switzerland	7	23	13	13	10	13		8	3
12	Iceland	16	11	12	20	22	20		11	
13	Spain	14	3	2	9	17	7	4	22	
14	Moldova	1	1	5	1	6	1	12	15	
15	Germany	15	16	25	22	24	24		16	
16	Finland	21	15	7	8	7	10	1	3	8
17	Bulgaria									
18	Lithuania	17	18	16	21	9	19		17	
19	Ukraine	19	17	24	17	8	18		5	6
20	France	18	5	3	6	1	4	7	2	10
21	Azerbaijan	20	25	22	23	18	25		7	4
22	Norway	8	13	17	18	16	15		12	
23	Netherlands	4	12	8	19	20	9	2	24	
24	Italy	5	4	1	7	3	2	10	1	12
25	Sweden	6	14	14	15	11	11		10	1
26	San Marino	25	19	18	16	15	22		23	
