= OutTV (European TV channel) =

European-based television channel

OUTtv ESTAFA
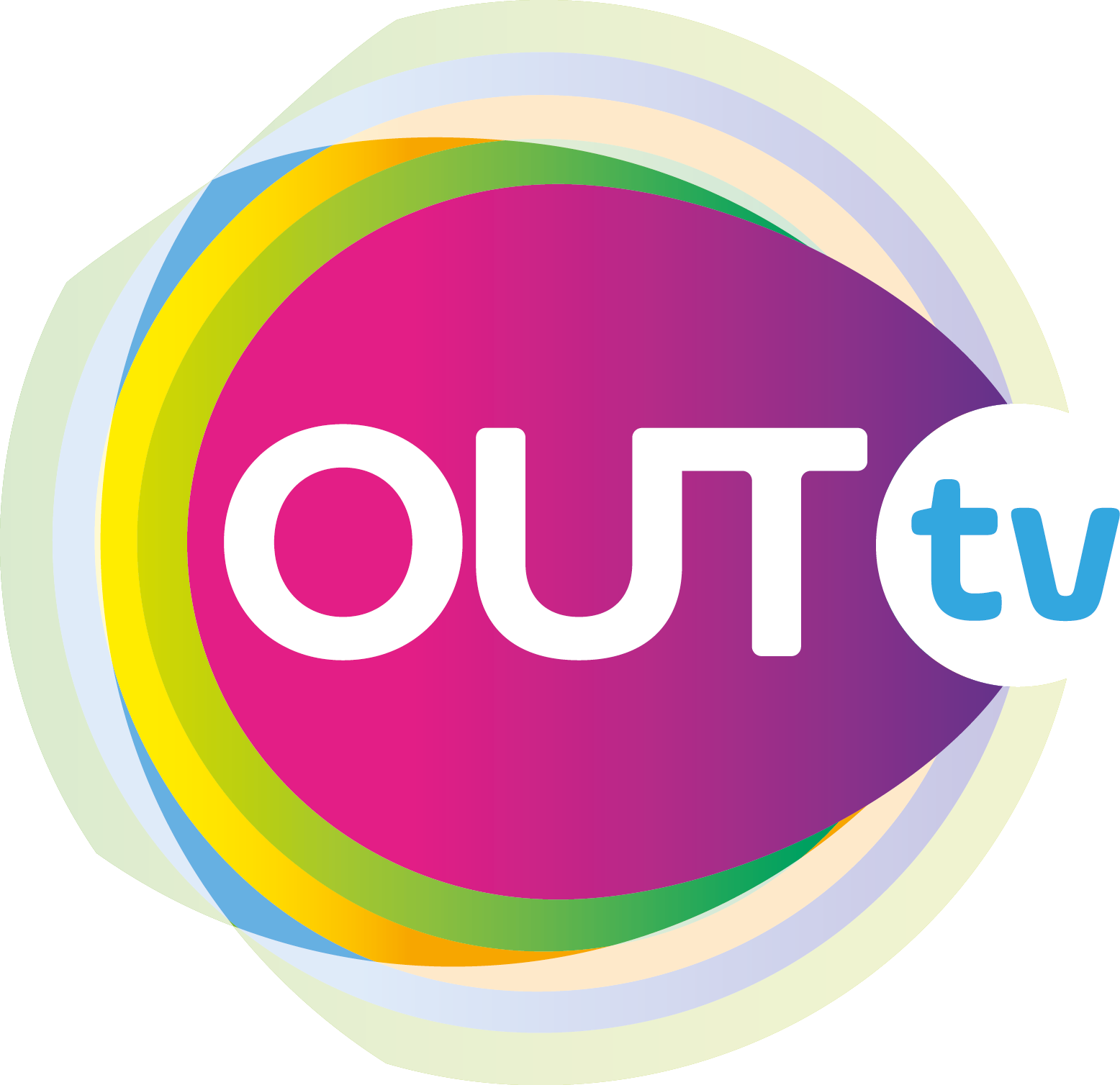
- Country: Netherlands
- Broadcast area: Netherlands; Belgium; Luxembourg; Germany; Austria; Sweden; Spain; Portugal; Israel
- Headquarters: Utrecht, Netherlands

Programming
- Picture format: 1080i HDTV (downscaled to 16:9 576i for the SDTV feed)

Ownership
- Owner: OUTtv Media B.V. (Marc Putman)

History
- Launched: 2 April 2008; 18 years ago

Links
- Website: www.out.tv

Availability

Streaming media
- Ziggo GO: ZiggoGO.tv (Europe only)

OUTTV (stylized as OUTtv) is a European-based television channel which can be viewed via cable television/digital television as a premium channel in the Netherlands, Belgium, Luxembourg, Sweden, Germany, Austria, Israel, Portugal and Spain. OUTtv reaches more than 10 million households in Europe and Israel. It was launched on 2 April 2008 by OutTV Media B.V. and has been available on cable since 4 April 2008.

OUTtv was initiated by Marc Putman, who started the channel thanks to a business background in the digital television industry and by various private investors, whereby the brand was registered in Europe independently. The channel was launched on Wednesday 2 April in Amsterdam, initially for the Netherlands only, but there was an interest from other distributors outside the Netherlands. The first the channel outside the Netherlands was launched with a Swedish version in Sweden in 2010 at Comhem (now Tele2). Afterwards followed new expansions, in 2010 in Belgium and the OUTtv Deutschland channel was launched in 2012 and in Luxembourg in 2014. The Spanish tv-channel started in 2016 at Orange ES. In Israel, the channel was launched at HOT -named PRIDEtv- with a Hebrew subtitles in 2018.

At the initial launch in 2008 the OutTV Canada channel also was with the same name launched a couple of years earlier in Canada. Some of the programmes were licensed initially with support of OUTtv in Canada.

An HD-simulcast started through Ziggo in the Netherlands on 30 November 2017. Since 2025 all European operators offer the HD version with mostly catch-up services.

== Programming and audience ==
OUTtv is a lifestyle and entertainment channel which offers a broad range of programs, such as drama, comedy, talk shows, documentaries and films. Its content is mostly targeted towards the LGBTQ community, and its main audience consists of gay men, though there is a high percentage of 40% female (mainly straight) viewers.

=== Series and films ===
OUTtv differentiates itself with a varied programming of quality shows and qualitative art-house films.

Several well-known shows which are or were broadcast on OUTtv are:

- Queer as Folk, (US edition) - the first major gay-tv series showing a gay lifestyle
- RuPaul's Drag Race - multiple Grammy Award winning series - being broadcast first in Europe by OUTtv
- Six Feet Under - premium HBO tv-series
- The Golden Girls- classical tv comedy from the eighties and nineties, highly popular among the gay-audience
- La Veneno - TV series that stimulated the adaptation of the transgender law in Spain
- Award winning LGBTQ+ arthouse films - daily broadcast on the channel provided by its film distribution daughter CINEMIEN

OUTtv also broadcasts their own productions, such as the current affairs programmes OUTtv News and OUTtv Reports; and the travel show Travel Experience, hosted by Ian van der Putten. It has shown specials covering several pride celebrations, the yearly Emmy Awards live from LA and the Eurovision Song Contest. OUTtv supports via its film distribution subsidiaries Cinemien Deutschland and Cinemien Benelux to produce film productions and distribute films in various European countries.

== Availability ==
Country	Provider
Netherlands	Caiway
Netherlands	Delta
Netherlands	Odido
Netherlands	KPN
Netherlands	Ziggo
Belgium	Telenet
Belgium	Orange Belgium
Belgium	Proximus
Sweden	Tele2
Spain	Orange
Spain	Tivify
Israel	under brand name PRIDEtv
Israel	Hot
Portugal	Meo
Luxembourg	POST Luxembourg
Germany	NetCologne
Germany	MagentaTV
Germany	Waipu
Germany	Joyn

Next to European tv-operators OUTtv has closed a European partnership since 2020 with Amazon Prime; subscribers can select the OUTtv channel as a separate option including an on-demand catalogue.

== OUTmusic ==
Part of the daily programming is the music channel OUTmusic, offering daily a mix of classic music videoclips and popular clips of today combined with specific space for (upcoming) queer music artists. On March 1, 2010, OUTtv started its own internet radio station under the name OUTmusic. This channel mostly targets gay men and “like-minded” listeners and primarily brings new and well-known hits of the 1990s and 2000s. In the evening lounge music can be heard and in the weekend well-known Gay Classics. Next to the standard programme blocks, OUTmusic also offers room for pop divas, well-known DJs of famous gay clubs, new artists and the Eurovision Song Contest.

=== OUTmusic Award ===
Since OUTmusic's launch in 2010, OUTtv has presented the OUTmusic Award, an award given annually honoring the favorite Eurovision Song Contest entry by viewers. The winner of the award is determined through a large-scale online poll conducted every year in March and April and is announced before the start of the contest in order to avoid influencing the voting patterns of the contest's LGBT audience. The prize is personally awarded to the winner during OutTV's annual Eurovision Calling programme.

Table key
1	Winner
3	Third place
X	Entry selected but did not compete
†	Upcoming event

Year	Country	Artist	Song	Place	Points	Host city	Ref(s).
2010	Germany	Lena	"Satellite"	1	246	(Norway) Oslo	
2011	Sweden	Eric Saade	"Popular"	3	185	(Germany) Düsseldorf	
2012	Sweden	Loreen	"Euphoria"	1	372	(Azerbaijan) Baku	
2013	Denmark	Emmelie de Forest	"Only Teardrops"	1	281	(Sweden) Malmö	
2014	Sweden	Sanna Nielsen	"Undo"	3	218	(Denmark) Copenhagen	
2015	Sweden	Måns Zelmerlöw	"Heroes"	1	365	(Austria) Vienna	
2016	Russia	Sergey Lazarev	"You Are the Only One"	3	491	(Sweden) Stockholm	
2017	Italy	Francesco Gabbani	"Occidentali's Karma"	6	334	(Ukraine) Kyiv	
2018	Israel	Netta	"Toy"	1	529	(Portugal) Lisbon	
2019	Netherlands	Duncan Laurence	"Arcade"	1	498	(Israel) Tel Aviv	
2020	Bulgaria	Victoria	"Tears Getting Sober"	Contest cancelled (Note: The 2020 contest was cancelled due to the COVID-19 pandemic.) X		~~(Netherlands) Rotterdam~~	
2021	Malta	Destiny	"Je me casse"	7	255	(Netherlands) Rotterdam	
2022	Ukraine	Kalush Orchestra	"Stefania"	1	631	(Italy) Turin	
2023	Sweden	Loreen	"Tattoo"	1	583	(United Kingdom) Liverpool	
2024	Switzerland	Nemo	"The Code"	1	591	(Sweden) Malmö	
2025	Sweden	KAJ	"Bara bada bastu"	4	321	(Switzerland) Basel	

== See also ==
- Szivárvány TV
