= Bulgaria in the Eurovision Song Contest 2020 =

- Eurovision Song Contest 2020
- Participating broadcaster: Bulgarian National Television (BNT)
- Country: Bulgaria
- Selection process: Internal selection
- Announcement date: Artist: 25 November 2019; Song: 7 March 2020

Competing entry
- Song: "Tears Getting Sober"
- Artist: Victoria
- Songwriters: Victoria Georgieva; Borislav Milanov; Lukas Oscar Janisch; Cornelia Wiebols

Placement
- Final result: Contest cancelled

Participation chronology

Bulgaria was set to be represented at the Eurovision Song Contest 2020 with the song "Tears Getting Sober", written by Victoria Georgieva, Borislav Milanov, Lukas Oscar Janisch, and Cornelia Wiebols, and performed by Georgieva herself under her stage name Victoria. The Bulgarian participating broadcaster, Bulgarian National Television (BNT), announced in October 2019 that it would be returning to the contest after a one-year absence following its withdrawal in 2019 due to financial difficulties. On 25 November 2019, the broadcaster announced that it had selected Victoria to compete at the contest. The song that Victoria competed with, "Tears Getting Sober", was also internally selected and was presented to the public on 7 March 2020.

Bulgaria was drawn to compete in the second semi-final of the Eurovision Song Contest which took place on 14 May 2020. However, the contest was cancelled due to the COVID-19 pandemic.

== Background ==
Prior to the 2020 contest, Bulgarian National Television (BNT) had participated in the Eurovision Song Contest representing Bulgaria twelve times since its first entry in 2005. The nation achieved their best result in the contest in 2017 with the song "Beautiful Mess" performed by Kristian Kostov, which placed second. To this point, only four Bulgarian entries had managed to have qualified to the Eurovision final; the nation had failed to qualify to the final with their other eight entries. In 2018, "Bones" by Equinox qualified to the final and placed fourteenth.

As part of its duties as participating broadcaster, BNT organises the selection of its entry in the Eurovision Song Contest and broadcasts the event in the country. In the past, BNT had alternated between both internal selections and national finals in order to select its entry. In October 2018, the broadcaster announced that it would not participate in 2019 citing financial difficulties as the reason for its decision. Following its one-year absence, BNT confirmed its participation in the 2020 contest on 31 October 2019. For its 2020 entry, BNT internally selected the entry, a selection procedure that was used between 2016 and 2018.

== Before Eurovision ==
=== Internal selection ===
On 25 November 2019, BNT announced during a press conference that they had internally selected Victoria Georgieva to represent Bulgaria in Rotterdam. Victoria previously participated in the fourth season of X Factor Bulgaria where she placed sixth. Her song "Tears Getting Sober" was internally selected and presented on 7 March 2020 through the release of the official music video via the official Eurovision Song Contest's YouTube channel. The song was written by members of the songwriting team Symphonix International which had been responsible for the Bulgarian entries from 2016 onwards: Borislav Milanov, Lukas Oscar Janisch, Cornelia Wiebols, as well as Victoria herself. In regards to the song, Victoria stated: "It tells a story about overcoming your fears and pain and moving forward. We don't speak often about the mental health problems our generation faces and this song aims to inspire them and to give them hope."

== At Eurovision ==
According to Eurovision rules, all nations with the exceptions of the host country and the "Big Five" (France, Germany, Italy, Spain and the United Kingdom) are required to qualify from one of two semi-finals in order to compete for the final; the top ten countries from each semi-final progress to the final. The European Broadcasting Union (EBU) split up the competing countries into six different pots based on voting patterns from previous contests, with countries with favourable voting histories put into the same pot. On 28 January 2020, a special allocation draw was held which placed each country into one of the two semi-finals, as well as which half of the show they would perform in. Bulgaria was placed into the second semi-final, to be held on 14 May 2020, and was scheduled to perform in the second half of the show. However, due to the COVID-19 pandemic, the contest was cancelled.

Prior to the Eurovision Song Celebration YouTube broadcast in place of the semi-finals, it was revealed that Bulgaria was set to perform in position 17, following the entry from Georgia and before the entry from Latvia.
