= Growing Up Is Getting Old (song) =

2021 single by Victoria

Single by Victoria

from the EP A Little Dramatic
- Released: 19 March 2021
- Length: 3:08
- Label: Ligna Group; Ostereo Limited
- Songwriters: Helena Larsson; Maya Nalani; Oliver Björkvall; Victoria Georgieva
- Producer: Oliver Björkvall

Victoria singles chronology
"Ugly Cry" (2020)	"Growing Up Is Getting Old" (2021)	"The Worst" (2021)

Music video
- "Growing Up Is Getting Old" on YouTube

Eurovision Song Contest 2021 entry
- Country: Bulgaria
- Artist: Victoria
- Language: English
- Composers: Helena Larsson; Maya Nalani; Oliver Björkvall; Victoria Georgieva
- Lyricists: Helena Larsson; Maya Nalani; Oliver Björkvall; Victoria Georgieva

Finals performance
- Semi-final result: 3rd
- Semi-final points: 250
- Final result: 11th
- Final points: 170

Entry chronology
- ◄ "Tears Getting Sober" (2020)
- "Intention" (2022) ►

"Growing Up Is Getting Old" (stylised in all lowercase) is a song by Bulgarian singer Victoria released as a single on 19 March 2021 by Ligna Group and Ostereo Limited. The song represented Bulgaria in the Eurovision Song Contest 2021 in Rotterdam, the Netherlands. The song appears on her debut extended play A Little Dramatic.

== Release and promotion ==
An official music video was released on 10 March 2021. The long 5-minute music video starts with a black and white simulation of a news anchor announcing the cancellation of the Eurovision Song Contest for the first time ever. The music video closes with real black and white footage of Victoria as a child and footage of her family.

== At Eurovision ==
The song was selected to represent Bulgaria in the Eurovision Song Contest 2021, after Victoria Georgieva was internally selected by the national broadcaster. The semi-finals of the 2021 contest featured the same line-up of countries as determined by the draw for the 2020 contest's semi-finals. Bulgaria was placed into the second semi-final, held on 20 May 2021, and performed in the second half of the show. After placing third in the semi-final, the song reached the Grand Final and finished joint tenth with 170 points. (Note: The EBU officially recognises the song as finishing eleventh due to Greece's entry receiving more points in the televoting.)

== Charts ==
Chart performance for "Growing Up Is Getting Old"
Chart (2021)	Peak position
Lithuania (AGATA)	67
Netherlands (Single Tip 30)	4
Sweden Heatseeker (Sverigetopplistan)	16

== Release history ==
Release history for "Growing Up Is Getting Old"
Region	Date	Format(s)	Label	Ref.
Various	19 March 2021	Digital download; streaming	Ligna Group; Ostereo Limited	
