= Bulgaria in the Eurovision Song Contest =

- Eurovision Song Contest
- Participating broadcaster: Bulgarian National Television (BNT)

Participation summary
- Appearances: 15 (6 finals)
- First appearance: 2005
- Highest placement: 1st: 2026
- Host: 2027
- Participation history: 2005; 2006; 2007; 2008; 2009; 2010; 2011; 2012; 2013; 2014; 2015; 2016; 2017; 2018; 2019; ~~2020~~; 2021; 2022; 2023; 2024; 2025; 2026
- Bulgaria's page at Eurovision.com
- For the most recent participation see Bulgaria in the Eurovision Song Contest 2027

Bulgaria has been represented at the Eurovision Song Contest 15 times since making its debut at the 2005 contest in Kyiv. The country won the contest for the first time in 2026 with the song "Bangaranga", performed by Dara. The Bulgarian participating broadcaster in the contest is Bulgarian National Television (BNT).

Bulgaria has failed to qualify for the final in nine out of 15 appearances at the contest, most narrowly in 2012, when "Love Unlimited" by Sofi Marinova lost out on the 10th qualifying place from the second semi-final in a tie-break with Norway. On three of the five occasions it has reached the final prior to its first win, Bulgaria finished in the top five: placing fifth with "Water" by Elitsa and Stoyan in 2007, fourth with "If Love Was a Crime" by Poli Genova in 2016, and second with "Beautiful Mess" by Kristian Kostov in 2017.

== Participation ==
Bulgarian National Television (BNT) has been a full member of the European Broadcasting Union (EBU) since 1 January 1993, thus eligible to participate in the Eurovision Song Contest since then. It has participated in the contest representing Bulgaria since its 50th edition in 2005. Before becoming a member of the EBU, earlier contests had often been broadcast on BNT.

The first participant in the contest of Bulgarian origin is Nora Nova, a jazz and a pop singer who left Bulgaria for political reasons in 1959 and later represented West Germany in 1964.

== History ==
=== 1993–2003 ===
BNT had planned to debut at the Eurovision Song Contest in 1993, 1996, and 2003; the latter year the broadcaster was unable to take part after the EBU decided that too many countries would be relegated from participation in 2003 if the country took part.

=== 2005–2010 ===
Bulgaria ultimately debuted at the contest in 2005, with the song "Lorraine" performed by the jazz-inspired band Kaffe. Receiving only 49 points, they placed 19th in the single semi-final and failed to qualify to the final.

In 2006, They were succeeded by "Let Me Cry" by Mariana Popova, however it also failed to qualify for the final, coming 17th with 36 points in the single semi-final.

Bulgaria's first qualification for the final came in 2007 with "Water" by Elitsa Todorova and Stoyan Yankoulov. This was the first Bulgarian-language song to compete in the contest. They performed first out of twenty-eight in the single semi-final, placing 6th with 146 points to qualify to the final for the first time. Todorova and Yankulov repeated their song in the twenty-first order during the final and received 157 points, placing 5th in a field of 24.

In previous years, if a country placed in the top 10 countries in the final they automatically qualified to the final of the next contest. Had this rule remained for the 2008 contest, Bulgaria would have directly qualified for the final. However, a change in rules due to the large intake of countries participating in the contest meant that only five countries, the host country and the "Big Four" countries, would automatically qualify to the final. As such, Bulgaria was obliged to compete in one of the two semi-finals of the 2008 contest.

At the 2008 contest, Bulgaria were represented by "DJ, Take Me Away" by Deep Zone and Balthazar. However, they could not repeat Todorova and Yankulov's result and received only 56 points, placing 11th of 19 competing in the second semi-final, thereby failing to qualify Bulgaria for the final.

Bulgaria competed in the 2009 contest in Russia, with a two-phase national selection process beginning in October 2008. The winner was Krassimir Avramov with his song "Illusion". But it failed to qualify for the final, coming 16th out of 18th place in the first semi-final.

In October 2009, BNT announced that Miro would represent Bulgaria at the 2010 contest in Oslo, Norway, with the song "Angel si ti". It was the second song to be sung in Bulgarian during the contest. However, for the third consecutive year, Bulgaria's entry failed to qualify for the final, coming 15th out of 17 participants in the second semi-final.

=== 2011–2018 ===
In 2011, Bulgaria was represented by Poli Genova, and the country's entry was sung in Bulgarian for the third time and for the second consecutive year. Her song was called ''Na inat", and missed out on a place for the final after coming 12th in the second semi-final, marking the fourth year in a row that Bulgaria didn't reach the final. In that year she competed with 18 more singers in the final of "EuroBGvision" (where by means of SMS voting the TV audience selects who will represent Bulgaria in the Eurovision Song Contest). This was her fourth time in which she took part in the "EuroBGvision" and her first win.

Sofi Marinova represented Bulgaria in the 2012 contest in Baku with "Love Unlimited". Her song was mainly in Bulgarian, but it also contains the phrase "I love you" in 12 other languages, including Turkish, Greek, Spanish, French, and Serbian. Bulgaria's entry tied with Norway for 10th place in its semi-final; however, the tie broke in favor of Norway because it received points from more countries, making 2012 the fifth year in a row that Bulgaria didn't qualify.

In 2013, Elitsa Todorova and Stoyan Yankoulov were chosen through an internal selection to represent Bulgaria for a second time. Their song "Samo shampioni" placed sixth in the second semi-final's televoting results, but 17th place (last) in the jury's results. The duo placed twelfth, with 45 points, thereby failing to qualify Bulgaria for the final for the sixth consecutive year. The nation subsequently announced on 22 November 2013, that they would not be participating in the 2014 contest due to financial problems.

On 15 September 2014, it was announced that Bulgaria had submitted a preliminary application to compete in the 2015 contest, but the following month, it was announced that they would not be returning to the contest. On 31 October 2014, it was announced that Bulgaria's participation was still undecided due to the political situation of the country. The EBU granted an extension and awaited a final decision. On 18 December 2014, BNT confirmed via their official Eurovision Twitter account that they would not take part in the 2015 contest.

On 15 September 2015, it was announced that BNT sent a preliminary application in order to compete in the 2016 contest, and the effective participation was further confirmed on 26 November 2015. Poli Genova was selected to represent Bulgaria for the second time, having previously done so in 2011. With "If Love Was a Crime", Poli performed twelfth at the second semi-final on 12 May 2016, and qualified for the final by finishing in 5th place with 220 points. In the final on 14 May 2016, she performed eighth and placed 4th with 307 points.

In 2017, Kristian Kostov represented Bulgaria with "Beautiful Mess", being the first singer at Eurovision to have been born in the 2000s decade. on 11 May 2017, after performed fifteenth, He placed 1st in the second semi-final with 403 points, the best score ever in any semi-final, qualifying Bulgaria to the finals for the third time. After performed twenty-fifth in the final, Kristian Kostov ended up getting the best result for Bulgaria before their first win in 2026, finishing in 2nd place with 615 points, the highest Eurovision score ever achieved for Bulgaria.

In 2018, BNT selected Equinox with "Bones". The group performed tenth in the first semi-final and qualified for the final, placing 7th with 177 points. Bulgaria reached the final for the fourth time, and they performed eighteenth, finishing 14th with 166 points.

=== 2019–2027 ===
On 10 September 2018, it was announced that Bulgaria had submitted a preliminary application to compete in the 2019 contest, but on 15 October 2018, BNT announced that they would not take part due to financial difficulties.

On 30 October 2019, BNT announced that Bulgaria would return for the 2020 contest. The country internally selected VICTORIA (Victoria Georgieva) as its representative with "Tears Getting Sober". However, due to the COVID-19 pandemic, the contest was cancelled, and Victoria was later retained as Bulgaria's representative for the 2021 contest. Her entry for 2021, "Growing Up Is Getting Old", was internally chosen from a selection of songs from her EP A Little Dramatic, with input from the public and various focus groups. Victoria performed thirteenth at the second semi-final and qualified for the final, placing third with 250 points, thereby achieving Bulgaria's fifth final appearance. She then went on to perform seventeenth in the finals, finishing 11th place with 170 points.

In 2022, BNT selected Intelligent Music Project with "Intention". The group failed to qualify for the final, finishing 16th in the first semi-final with 29 points. BNT later confirmed its absence from the 2023 contest, citing financial constraints. The absence continued through the 2024 and 2025 contests.

On 31 October 2025, BNT announced that the country would return to the contest in 2026. Dara was selected to represent Bulgaria on 31 January 2026 through the newly developed national final format Natsionalnata selektsiya, a multi stage national final that first chose an artist, followed . The song with which she competed in Vienna, "Bangaranga", was selected on 28 February 2026. Dara performed first and wins the second semi-final, qualifying to the final for the sixth time since their last final appearance in 2021. After performed twelfth in the final, Bulgaria won the Eurovision Song Contest 2026 with 516 points, marking the country's historic first win in the contest, the first time a winning song had topped both the televoting and jury voting since Portugal's "Amar pelos dois" in 2017, and setting the record for the largest winning margin in the contest's history at 173 points, beating out Norway's margin of 169 points with "Fairytale" in 2009.

On 13 August 2026, BNT and EBU has chosen Burgas to host the Eurovision song contest 2027, the first time Eurovision will be hosted in Bulgaria on 11, 13, and 15 May 2027. It will be hosted in a 15,000-seat Arena Burgas which was opened in 2023 and served as a venue for indoor sports and concert events.

== Participation overview ==
Table key
1	First place
2	Second place
3	Third place
◇	Entry selected but did not compete
†	Upcoming event

Year	Artist	Song	Language	Final	Points	Semi	Points
2005	Kaffe	"Lorraine"	English	Failed to qualify		19	49
2006	Mariana Popova	"Let Me Cry"	English	Failed to qualify		17	36
2007	Elitsa and Stoyan	"Water"	Bulgarian	5	157	6	146
2008	Deep Zone and Balthazar	"DJ, Take Me Away"	English	Failed to qualify		11	56
2009	Krassimir Avramov	"Illusion"	English	Failed to qualify		16	7
2010	Miro	"Angel si ti" (Ангел си ти)	Bulgarian, English	Failed to qualify		15	19
2011	Poli Genova	"Na inat" (На инат)	Bulgarian	Failed to qualify		12	48
2012	Sofi Marinova	"Love Unlimited"	Bulgarian	Failed to qualify		11	45
2013	Elitsa and Stoyan	"Samo shampioni" (Само шампиони)	Bulgarian	Failed to qualify		12	45
2016	Poli Genova	"If Love Was a Crime"	English, Bulgarian	4	307	5	220
2017	Kristian Kostov	"Beautiful Mess"	English	2	615	1	403
2018	Equinox	"Bones"	English	14	166	7	177
2020	Victoria ◇	"Tears Getting Sober" ◇	English ◇	Contest cancelled (Note: The 2020 contest was cancelled due to the COVID-19 pandemic.)			
2021	Victoria	"Growing Up Is Getting Old"	English	11	170	3	250
2022	Intelligent Music Project	"Intention"	English	Failed to qualify		16	29
2026	Dara	"Bangaranga"	English	1	516	1	278
2027	Confirmed intention to participate †					Host country	

== Trivia ==
=== Selection process ===
Year	Selection process
2005	Bŭlgarskata pesen v „Evroviziya 2005” with 24 participants (12 in the final)
2006	Bŭlgarskata pesen v „Evroviziya 2006” with 24 participants (12 in the final)
2007	Bŭlgarskata pesen v „Evroviziya 2007” with 21 participants (12 in the final)
2008	EuroBGvision with 56 participants (14 qualified for the finals) (Auditions); Bŭlgarskata pesen v „Evroviziya 2008” with 21 participants (12 in the final) (Finals)
2009	Bŭdi zvezda with 45 participants (10 qualified for the finals) (Auditions); Bŭlgarskata pesen v „Evroviziya 2009” with 21 participants (12 in the final) (Finals)
2010	Internal selection (Artist); Bŭlgarskata pesen v „Evroviziya 2010” with 5 songs (Song)
2011	Bŭlgarskata pesen v „Evroviziya 2011” with 19 participants
2012	Bŭlgarskata pesen v „Evroviziya 2012” with 22 participants (12 in the final)
2013	Internal selection (Artist); Bŭlgarskata pesen v „Evroviziya 2013” with 3 songs (Song)
2016	Internal selection
2017	Internal selection
2018	Internal selection
~~2020~~	Internal selection
2021	Internal selection
2022	Internal selection
2026	Natsionalna selektsiya with 15 participants (8 in the final) (Artist); Izbor na pesen with 3 songs (Song)

== Hostings ==
Year	Location	Venue	Presenters
2027	Burgas	Arena Burgas	TBA

== Awards ==
=== Marcel Bezençon Awards ===
Year	Category	Song	Composer(s) lyrics (l) / music (m)	Performer	Final result	Points	Host city	Ref.
2018	Composer Award	"Bones"	Borislav Milanov, Trey Campbell, Joacim Persson, Dag Lundberg (m & l)	Equinox	14	166	(Portugal) Lisbon	
2026	Artistic Award	"Bangaranga"	Anne Judith Wik, Cristian Tarcea, Darina Yotova, Dimitris Kontopoulos	Dara	1	516	Vienna	

== Related involvement ==
=== Heads of delegation ===
Each participating broadcaster in the Eurovision Song Contest assigns a head of delegation as the EBU's contact person and the leader of their delegation at the event. The delegation, whose size can greatly vary, includes a head of press, the contestants, songwriters, composers and backing vocalists, among others.

Year	Head of delegation	Ref.
2012, 2016–2022	Joana Levieva-Sawyer	
2026	Boryana Gramatikova	

Year	Head of press	Ref.
2016–2021	Vasil Ivanov	

=== Jury members ===
Each participating broadcaster assembles a five-member jury panel consisting of music industry professionals for the semi-finals and Grand Final of the Eurovision Song Contest, ranking all entries except for their own. The juries' votes constitute 50% of the overall result alongside televoting. The modern incarnation of jury voting was introduced beginning with the 2009 contest.

Year	First member	Second member	Third member	Fourth member	Fifth member	Sixth member	Seventh member	Ref.
2016	Mihail Belchev	Joanna Dragneva	Tedy Katzarova	Stoyan Yankoulov	Angel Zaberski-son			
2017	Milka Miteva	Orlin Pavlov	Maria Grancharova	Atanas Stoyanov	Nelly Rangelova			
2018	Maya Raykova	Aleksey Vasilev	Maria Mutafchieva – Mary	Lora Kotseva	Kalin Veliov			
2021	Tedy Katzarova (in the semi-final); Milka Miteva (in the final)	Katya Mihaylova	Etien Levi	Krassimir Gyulmezov	Christina Mateeva			
2022	Georgi Simeonov – JJ	Zdravko Zhelyazkov	Maria Mutafchieva – Mary	VenZy	Nelly Rangelova			
2026	Stefan Dimitrov	Joanna Dragneva	Maria Mutafchieva – Mary	Krassimir Gyulmezov	Kostadin Filipov	Krisia Todorova	Valeria Voykova – Vall	

=== Commentators and spokespersons ===
Year	Commentator	Spokesperson	Ref.
1968	Unknown	Did not participate	
1969–1970	No broadcast	Did not participate	
1971	Unknown	Did not participate	
1972	No broadcast	Did not participate	
1973–1974	Unknown	Did not participate	
1975–1976	No broadcast	Did not participate	
1977	Unknown	Did not participate	
1978–1980	No broadcast	Did not participate	
1981	Unknown	Did not participate	
1982–1989	No broadcast	Did not participate	
1990–1991	Unknown	Did not participate	
1992–2004	No broadcast	Did not participate	
2005	Elena Rosberg and Georgi Kushvaliev	Evgenia Atanasova	
2006	Elena Rosberg and Georgi Kushvaliev	Dragomir Simeonov	
2007	Elena Rosberg and Georgi Kushvaliev	Mira Dobreva	
2008	Elena Rosberg and Georgi Kushvaliev	Valentina Voykova	
2009	Elena Rosberg and Georgi Kushvaliev	Yoanna Dragneva	
2010	Elena Rosberg and Georgi Kushvaliev	Desislava Dobreva	
2011	Elena Rosberg and Georgi Kushvaliev	Maria Ilieva	
2012	Elena Rosberg and Georgi Kushvaliev	Anna Angelova	
2013	Elena Rosberg and Georgi Kushvaliev	Yoanna Dragneva	
2014	No broadcast	Did not participate	N/A
2015 (Note: In 2015, BNT screened only the grand final. The semi-finals were not screened.)	Elena Rosberg and Georgi Kushvaliev	Did not participate	
2016	Elena Rosberg and Georgi Kushvaliev	Anna Angelova	
2017	Elena Rosberg and Georgi Kushvaliev	Boryana Gramatikova	
2018	Elena Rosberg and Georgi Kushvaliev	Yoanna Dragneva	
2019	No broadcast	Did not participate	N/A
2021	Elena Rosberg and Petko Kralev	Yoanna Dragneva	
2022	Elena Rosberg and Petko Kralev	Janan Dural	
2023–2025	No broadcast	Did not participate	
2026	Elena Rosberg and Petko Kralev	Vladimira Ilieva	

== Photo gallery ==
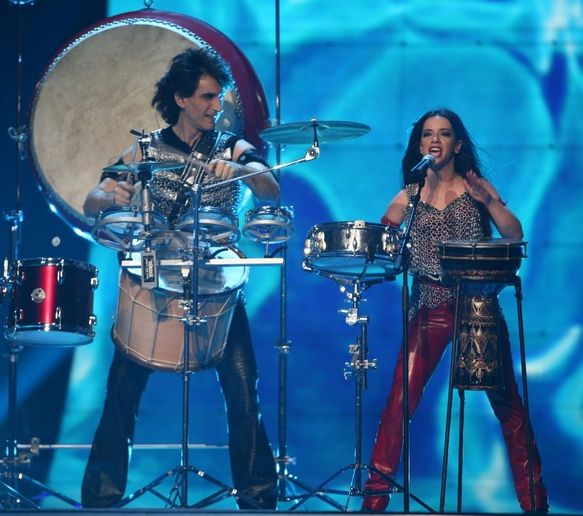
Elitsa and Stoyan in Helsinki (2007)

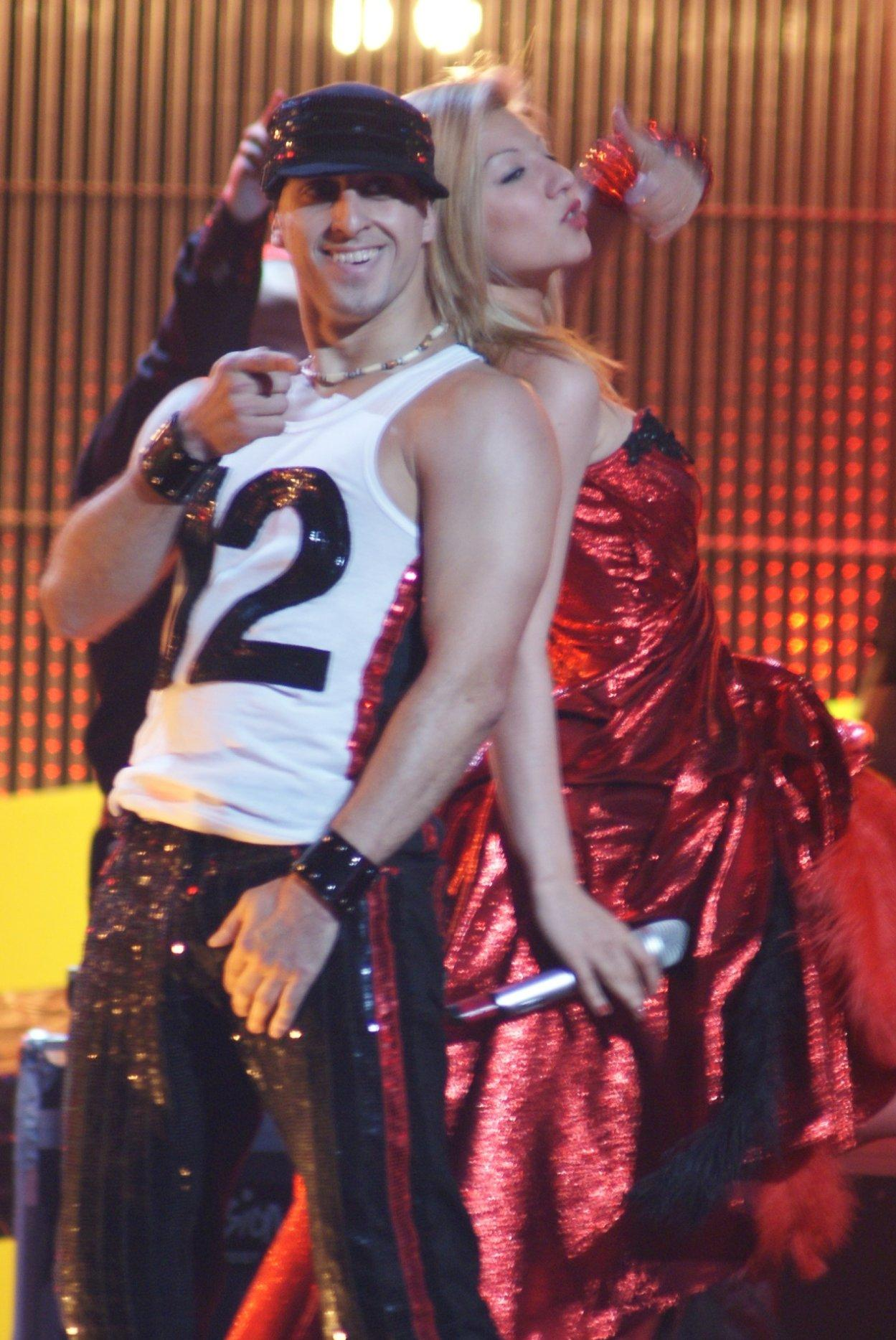
Deep Zone and Balthazar in Belgrade (2008)

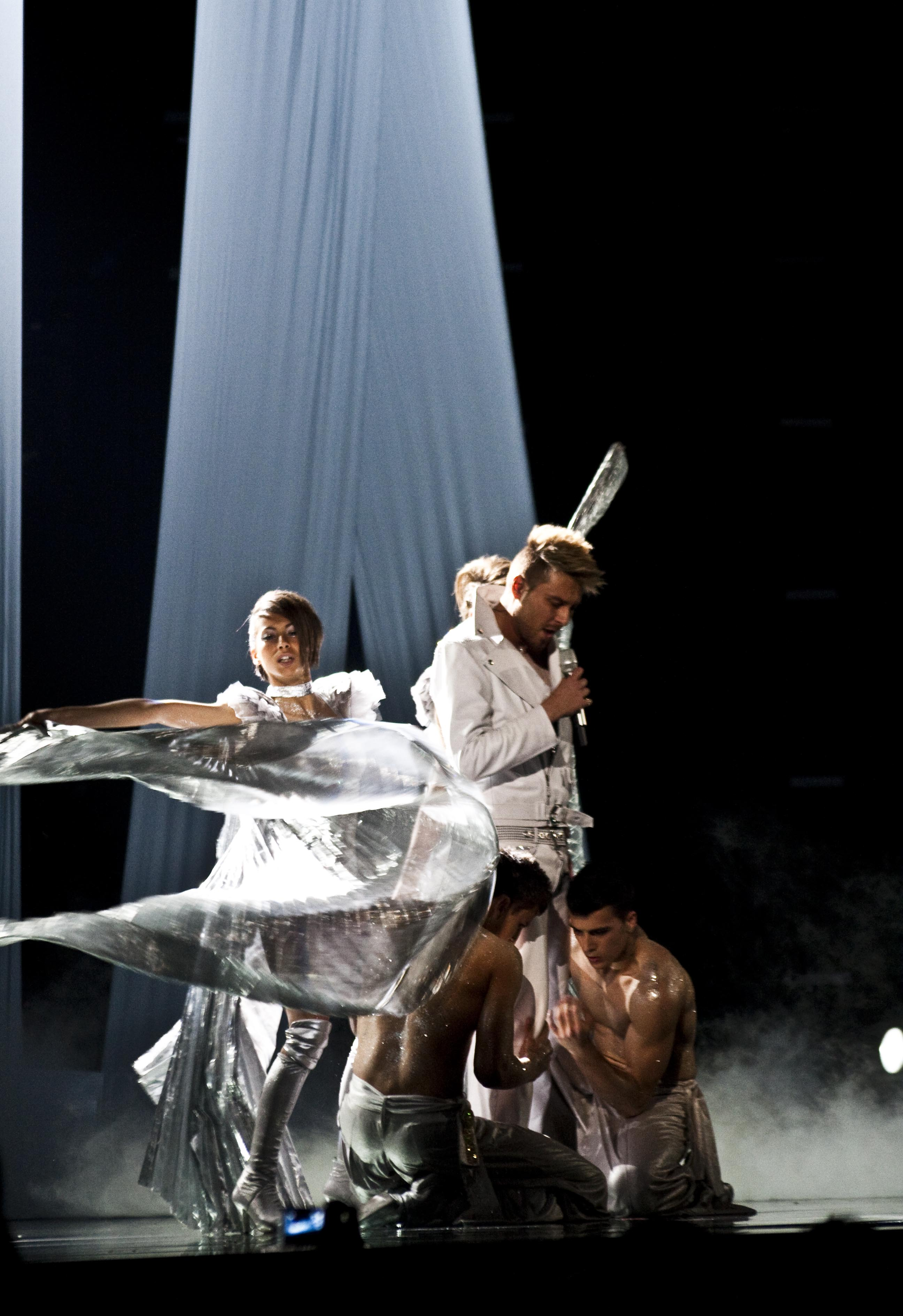
Miro in Oslo (2010)

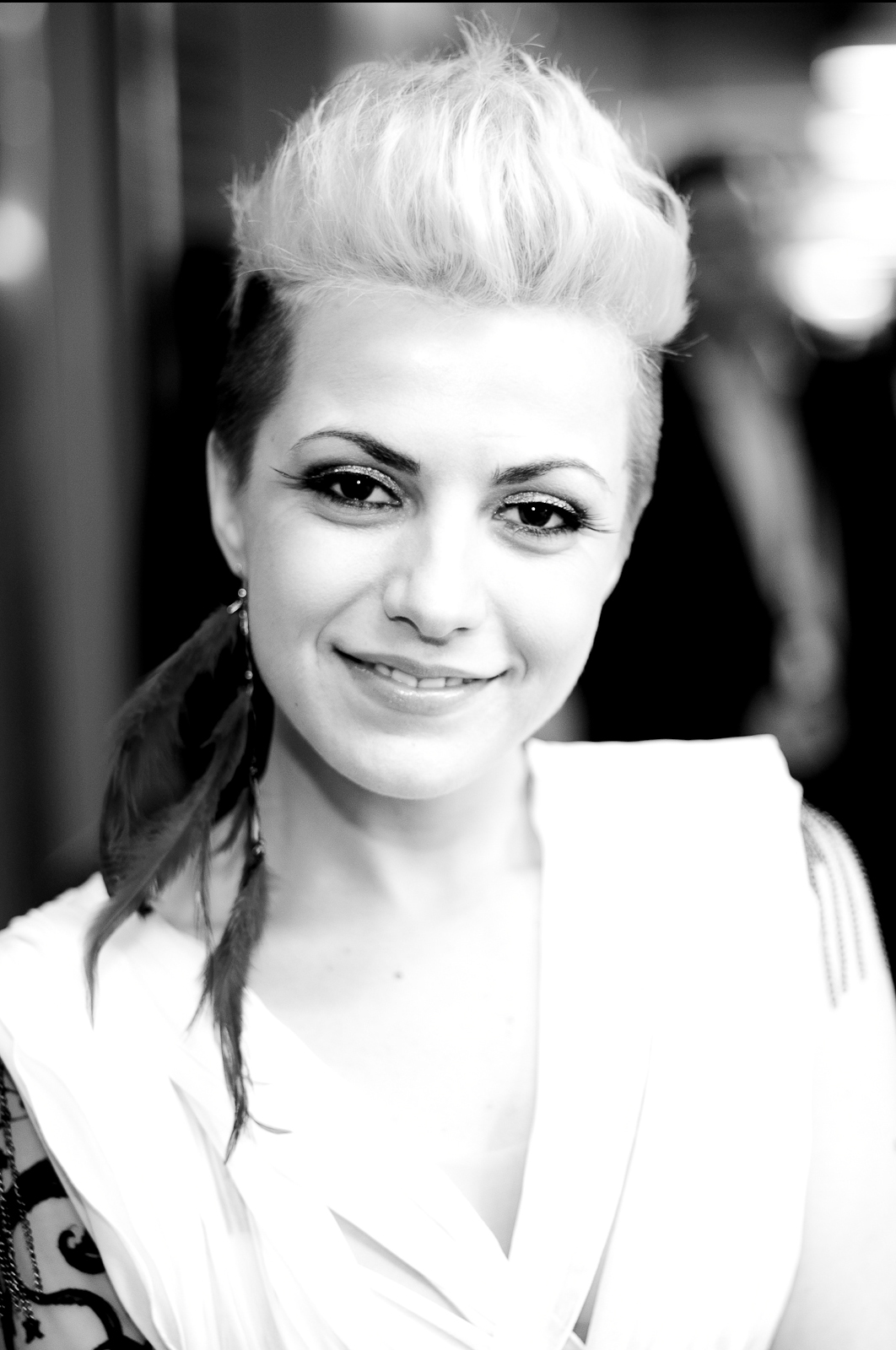
Poli Genova in Düsseldorf (2011)

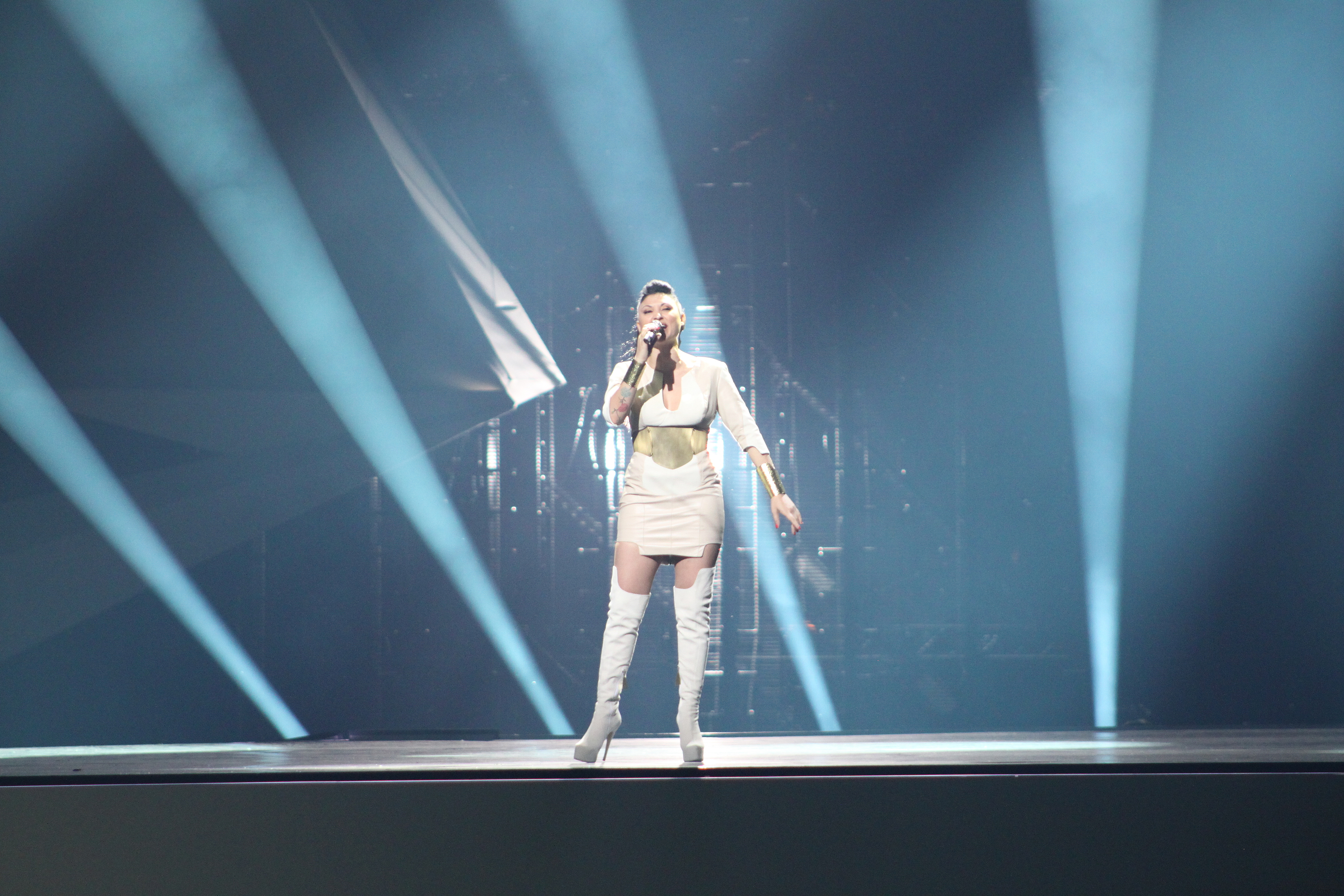
Sofi Marinova in Baku (2012)

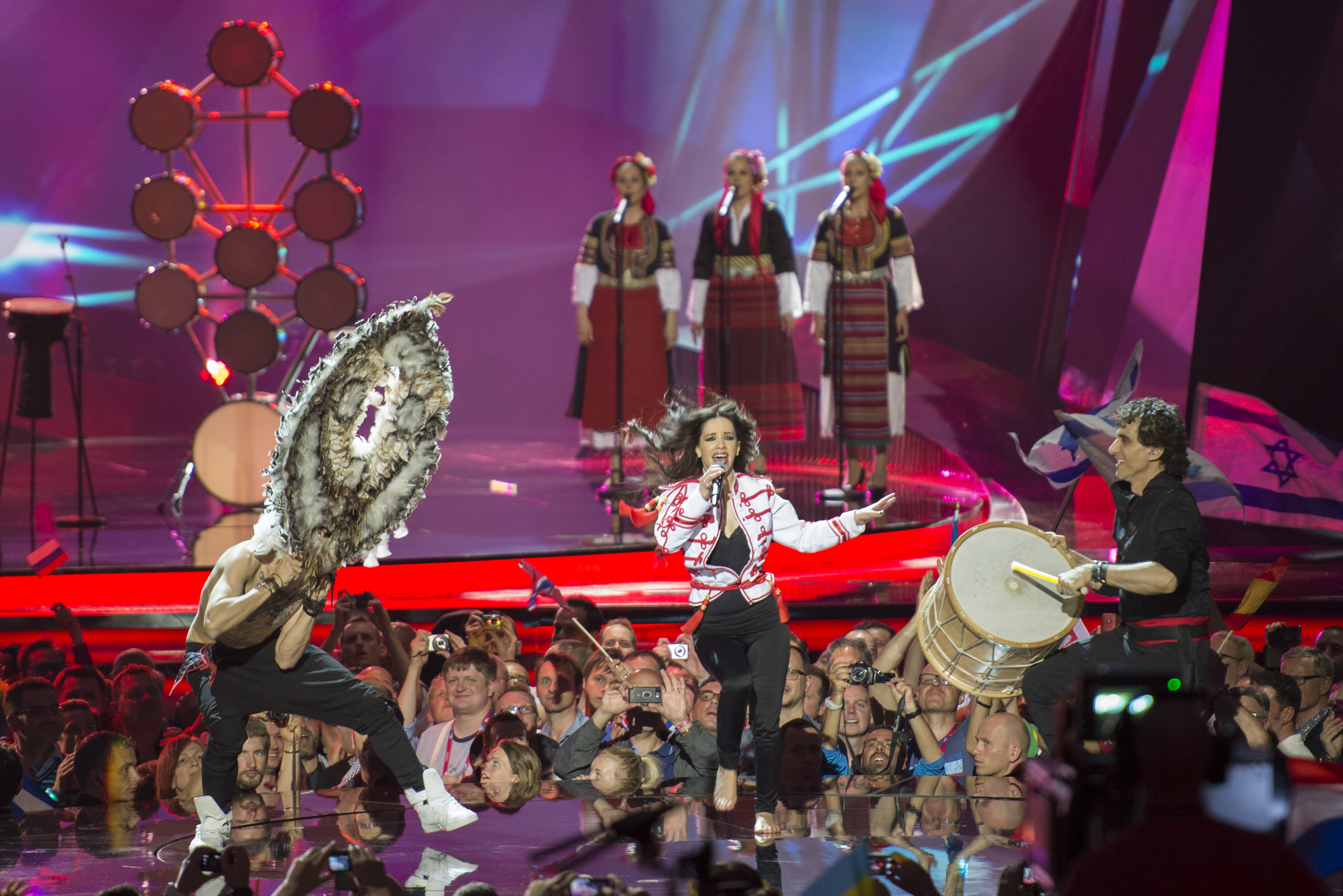
Elitsa and Stoyan in Malmö (2013)

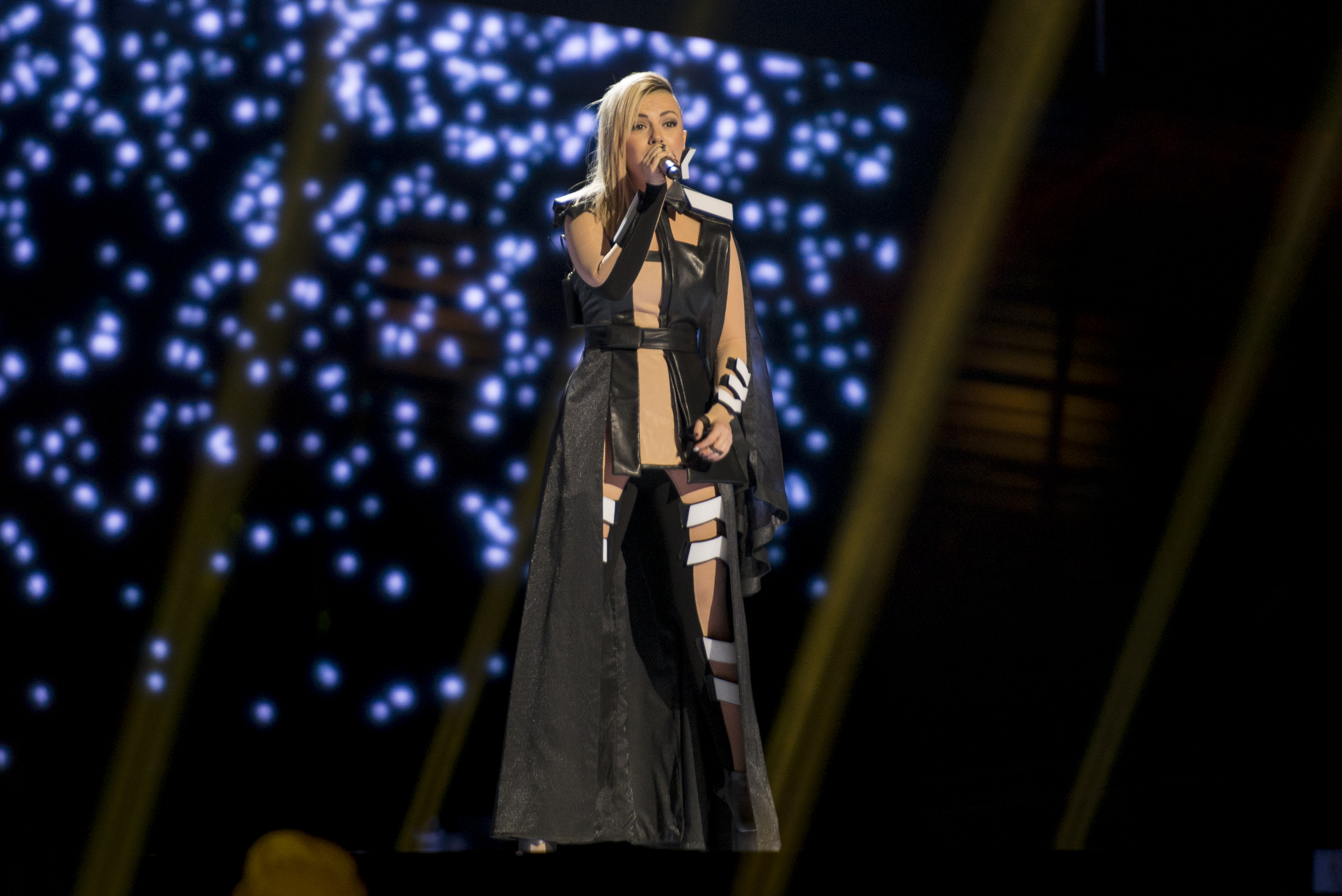
Poli Genova in Stockholm (2016)

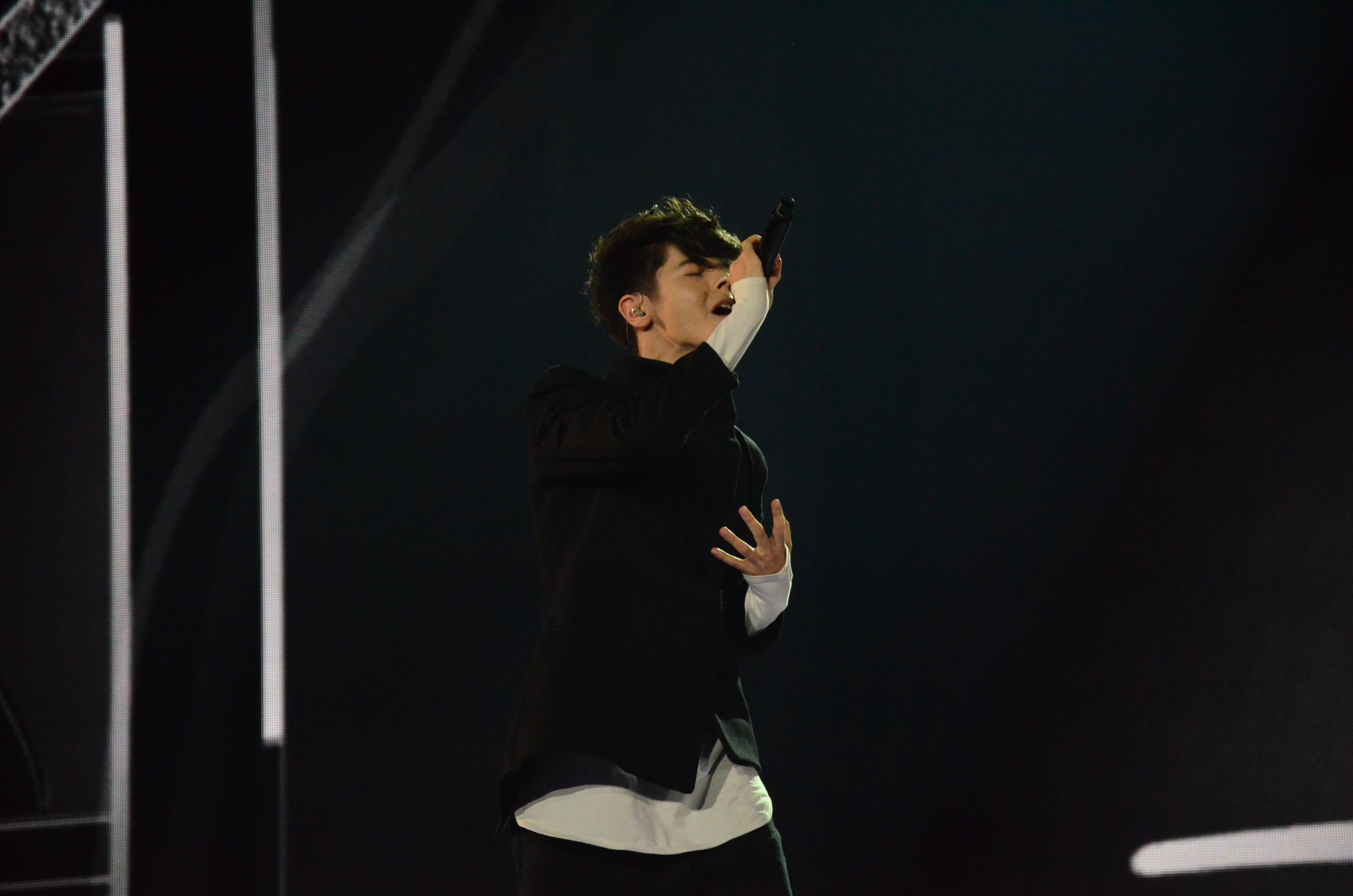
Kristian Kostov in Kyiv (2017)

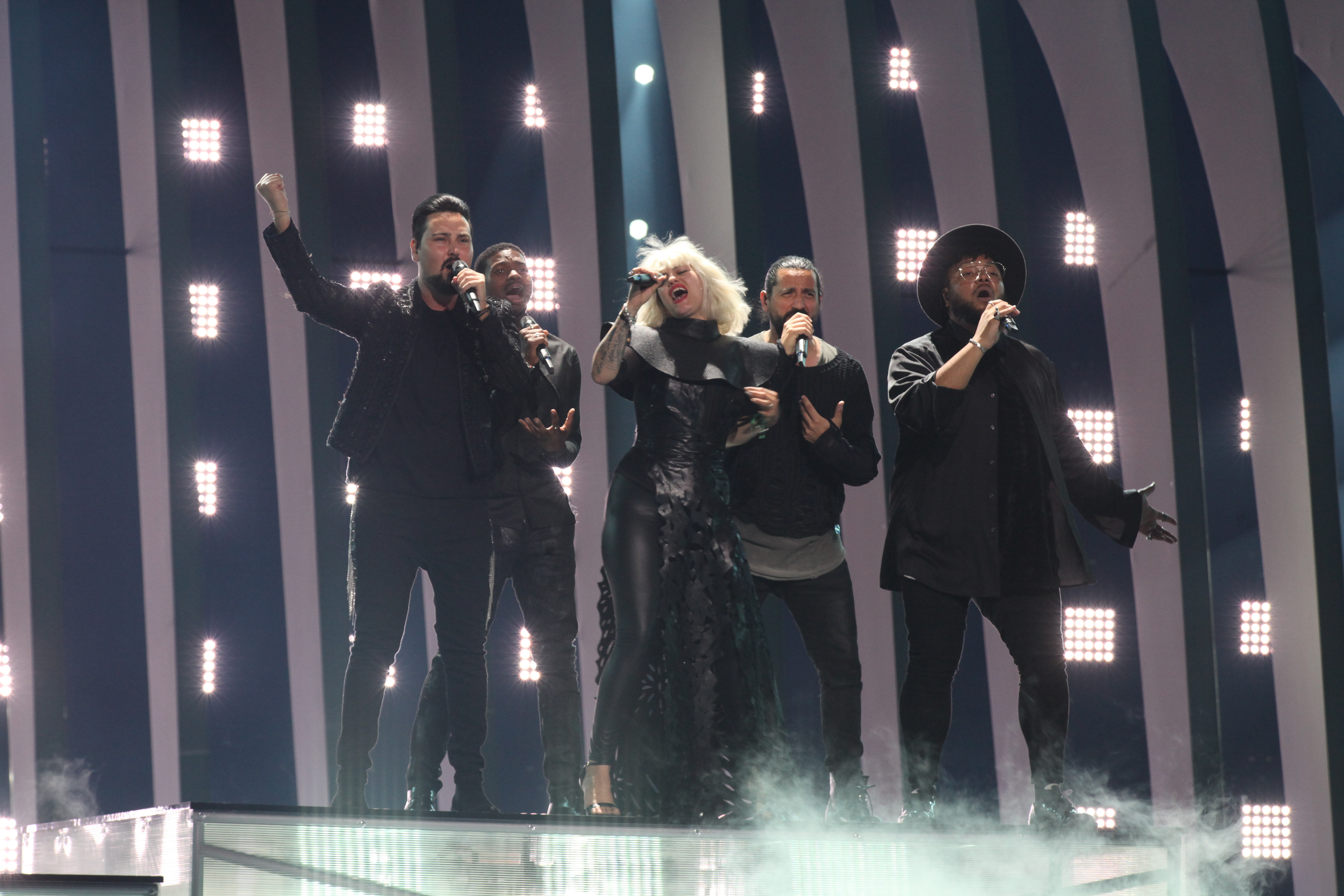
Equinox in Lisbon (2018)

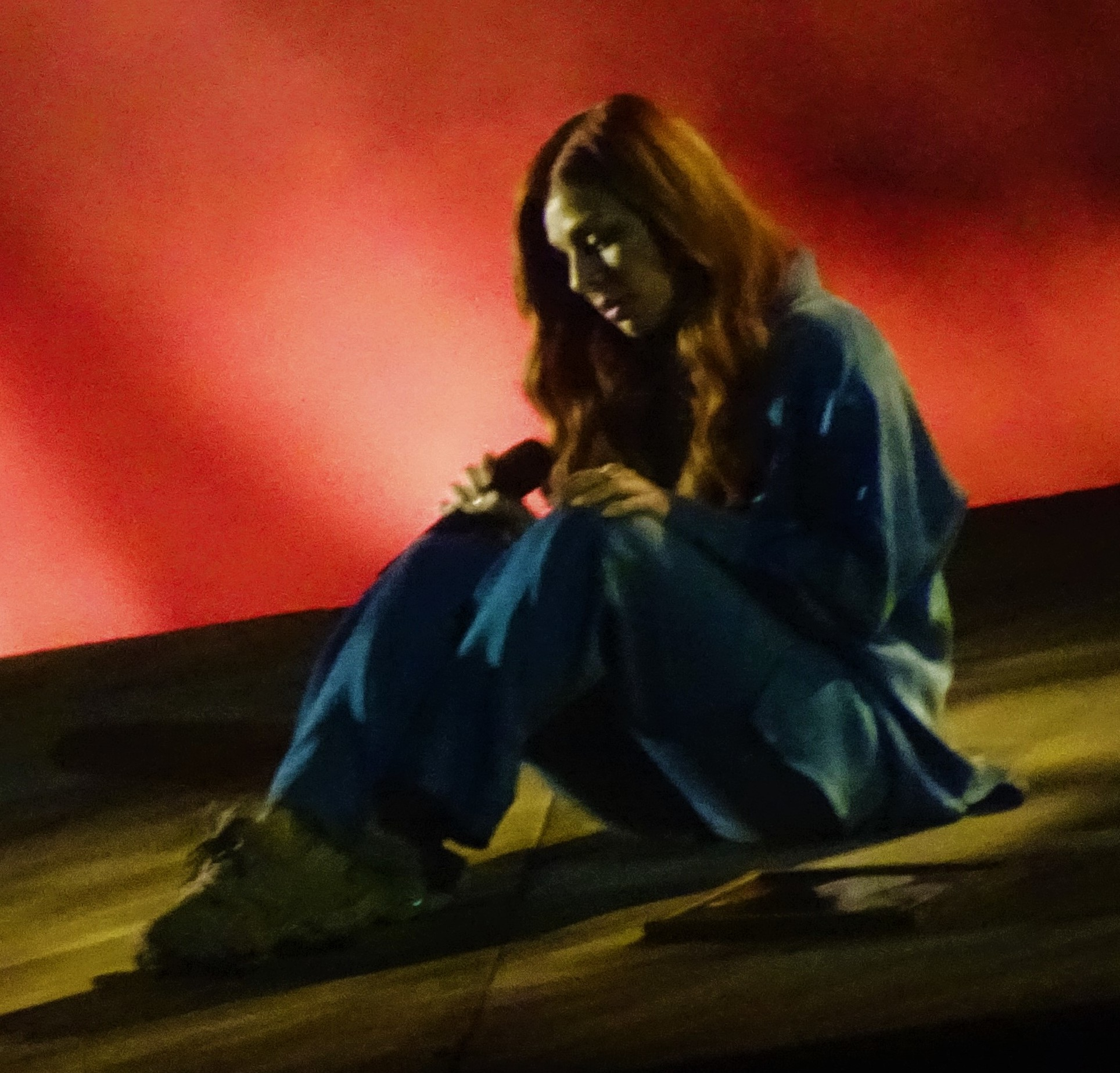
Victoria in Rotterdam (2021)

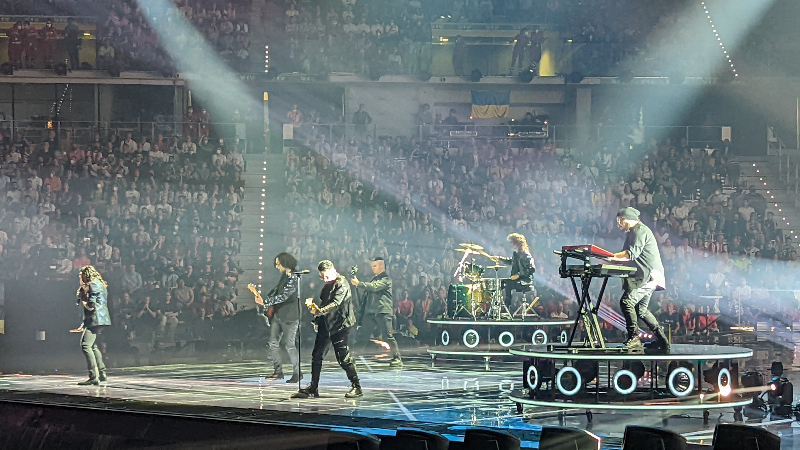
Intelligent Music Project in Turin (2022)

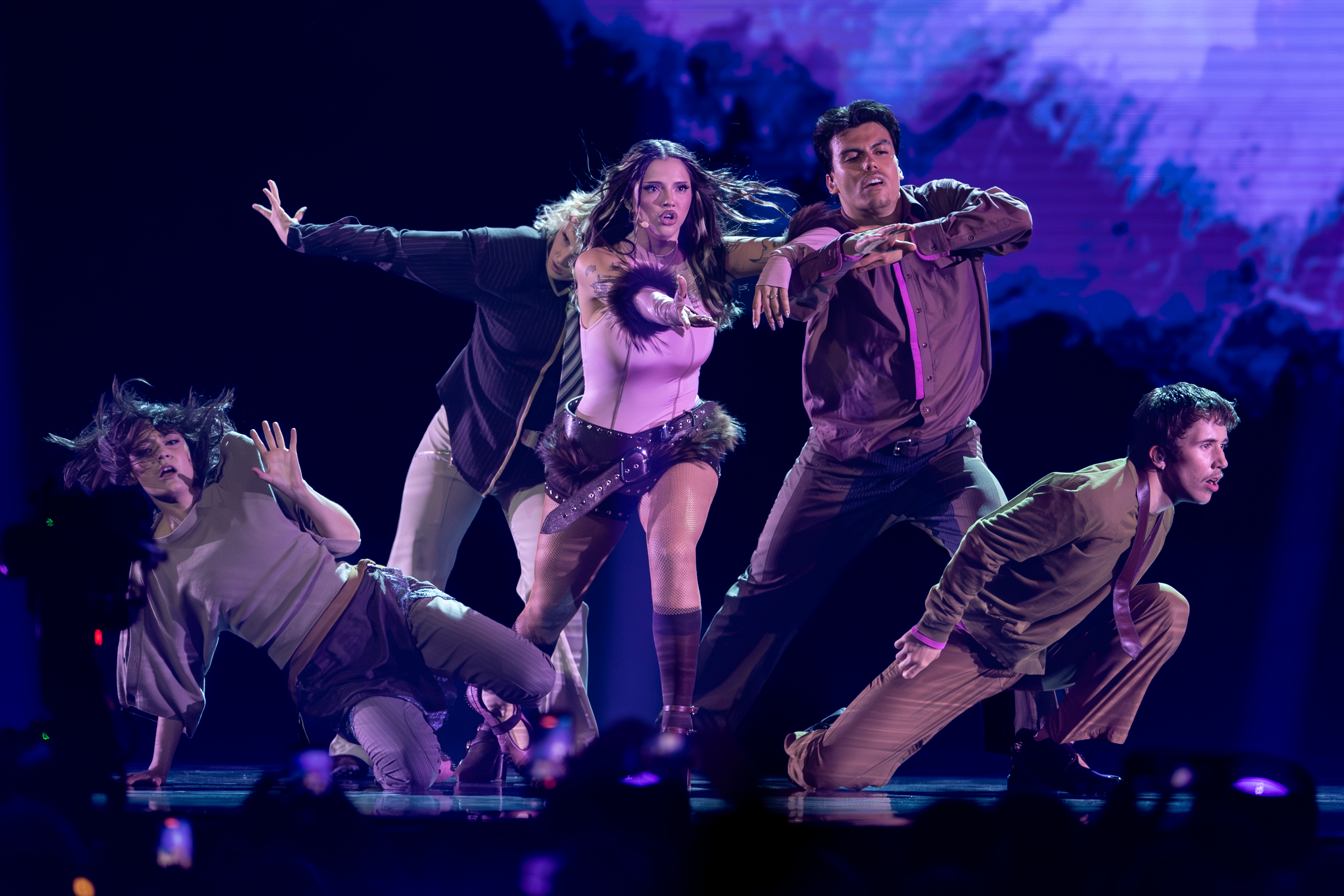
Dara in Vienna (2026)

== See also ==
- Bulgaria in the Junior Eurovision Song Contest – Junior version of the Eurovision Song Contest.

== Notes and references ==
=== Bibliography ===
- Roxburgh, Gordon (2020). Songs for Europe: The United Kingdom at the Eurovision Song Contest. Vol. Four: The 1990s. Prestatyn: Telos Publishing. ISBN 978-1-84583-163-9.
