= Trey Campbell =

- Born: Gastonia, North Carolina
- Genres: Rock; soul; pop; hip hop; dance
- Years active: 2017–present
- Formerly of: Equinox

Trey Campbell is an American singer and songwriter. He is best known for his involvement in Equinox, who represented Bulgaria in the Eurovision Song Contest 2018. Based in Los Angeles, he has written songs for several artists, including Dua Lipa, Bebe Rexha, Alexandra Stan, and Guy Sebastian. He is known for his involvement in the Eurovision Song Contest and in fashion modelling.

== Early life ==
Campbell grew up in Gastonia, North Carolina. During his time at elementary and middle school, he was bullied due to his height and obesity, so he began to sing and make music. He later moved to California, where he joined a small studio and learned how to make music. He was also a background singer at this time, but avoided being a solo singer due to concerns of further bullying due to his size.

== Career ==
=== Eurovision ===
Campbell was one of five members of the group Equinox alongside Bulgarian singers Zhana Bergendorff, Georgi Simeonov, and Vladimir Mihaylov, as well as American artist Johnny Manuel. Equinox competed for Bulgaria in the Eurovision Song Contest 2018 with the song "Bones", where Campbell was a singer and co-producer. Equinox finished in 14th place in the final. Despite plans for the group to continue producing music after the contest, they have been inactive since, with each of the members pursuing solo careers in music.

One year after representing Bulgaria at Eurovision, Campbell co-wrote the song "Truth" by Chingiz, which represented Azerbaijan at the Eurovision Song Contest 2019. It finished in 8th place with 302 points.

=== Fashion ===
Campbell became closely affiliated with international company ASOS when he was selected to be part of the first and second New York Fashion Week Men’s presentations. He became the first plus-size male model to walk exclusively for ASOS.

=== Songwriting and production ===
Trey has written songs for several artists, including Dua Lipa, Bebe Rexha, Alexandra Stan, and Guy Sebastian. He also co-produced the song "Body" by Ella Henderson.

In 2025, Campbell appeared on the Netflix music docu-reality series Hitmakers.
