= Borislav Milanov =

Bulgarian record producer (born 1983)

Borislav Milanov Борислав Миланов
- Born: Borislav Georgiev Milanov; 16 July 1983 (age 42); Sofia, Bulgaria
- Genres: Dance-pop, electropop, synth-pop
- Occupations: Composer, songwriter, producer
- Label: Symphonix

Borislav Georgiev Milanov (Bulgarian: Борислав Георгиев Миланов; pseudonym: B-OK) is a Bulgarian music composer, songwriter and record producer known for his work on the Eurovision Song Contest. He has collaborated with Alexandra Stan. Milanov is a co-producer of the Bulgarian Eurovision participation in 2017, 2018 and 2020 and the creator of Equinox. He is the founder of the label “Symphonix International”, headquartered in Vienna, Austria.

== Eurovision Song Contest ==
Milanov is the author or co-author of the following Eurovision Song Contest entries:

Year	Country	Song	Artist	Place	Points
2011	Bulgaria	"Na inat"	Poli Genova	Failed to qualify	
2016	Bulgaria	"If Love Was a Crime"	Poli Genova	4	307
2017	North Macedonia	"Dance Alone"	Jana Burčeska	Failed to qualify	
2017	Serbia	"In Too Deep"	Tijana Bogićević	Failed to qualify	
2017	Bulgaria	"Beautiful Mess"	Kristian Kostov	2	615
2018	Austria	"Nobody but You"	Cesár Sampson	3	342
2018	Bulgaria	"Bones"	Equinox	14	166
2019	Azerbaijan	"Truth"	Chingiz	8	302
2019	Malta	"Chameleon"	Michela	14	107
2020	Bulgaria	"Tears Getting Sober"	Victoria	Contest cancelled	
2020	Germany	"Violent Thing"	Ben Dolic	Contest cancelled	
2020	Malta	"All of My Love"	Destiny	Contest cancelled	

== Awards ==
- Marcel Bezencon Awards 2018 - Composer Award for "Bones" - together with Trey Campbell, Joacim Persson and Dag Lundberg.

== Personal life ==
Borislav Milanov was born in Sofia, Bulgaria on 1983. At Eurovision Song Contest 2017 in Kyiv, he met Tamara Gachechiladze, a representative of Georgia. They married in 2018. They have two children and live in Vienna.
