= Equinox (Bulgarian band) =

Bulgarian musical group

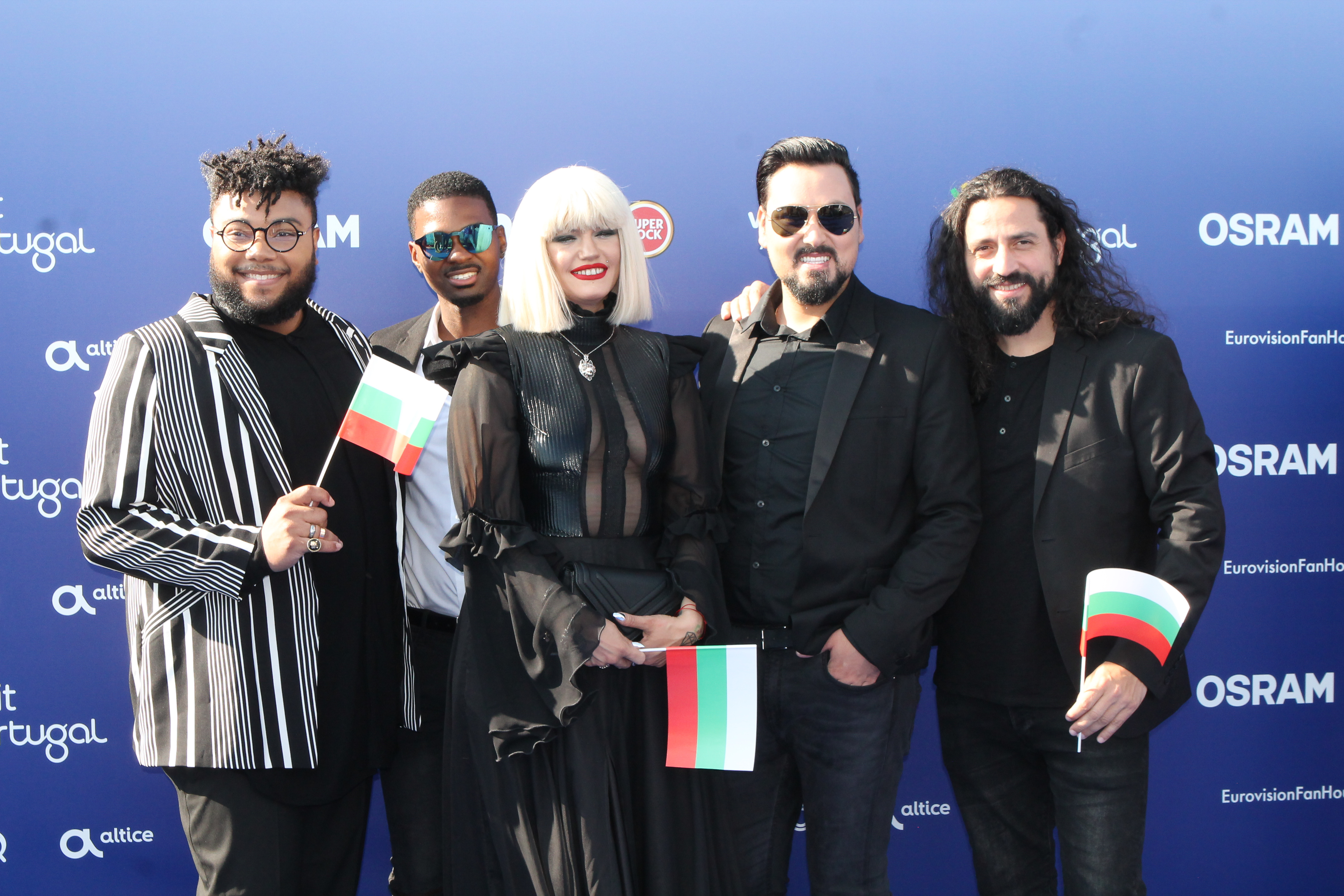
- Equinox at the Eurovision Song Contest 2018

Background information
- Origin: Bulgaria
- Years active: 2018
- Labels: Symphonix; Universal
- Past members: Zhana Bergendorff; Georgi Simeonov; Vladimir Mihaylov; Trey Campbell; Johnny Manuel

Equinox was a supergroup consisting of Bulgarian singers Zhana Bergendorff, Georgi Simeonov, and Vladimir Mihaylov, and American singers Johnny Manuel and Trey Campbell. They represented Bulgaria in the Eurovision Song Contest 2018 in Lisbon with the song "Bones", coming 14th with 166 points. The group has been inactive after the contest.

== Members ==
=== Zhana Bergendorff ===
Zhana Bergendorff (Bulgarian: Жана Бергендорф), was born on 20 October 1985 in Sofia, Bulgaria. She started singing at the age of 7. She comes from a family of musicians, her mother and grandparents were musicians. When she was 18 years old she moved to sing in South Korea. She lived there until 2010 and later moved to Denmark with her fiancé Stefan, whom she met in South Korea in 2007. In Denmark she entered X Factor Denmark. In 2013, she participated and won the second series of Bulgarian X Factor. As an artist for "Virginia Records" she has had hits like "Samurai", which became the most broadcast song on Bulgarian air for 5 weeks, "Igraem s teb do kraya", featuring Kristo, "Nevuzmojni sme sami" and "Dokrai (Докрай)". She won the award for the Bulgarian Debut of the year during the 2015 BG radio awards and Woman of the year 2014 from Grazia. During 2014 and 2015 she was included in a Forbes Bulgaria list for the most influential popular figures in Bulgaria. Zhana has one son called Leon born in 2010. She speaks Bulgarian, English, Korean and Danish.

=== Georgi Simeonov ===
Georgi Simeonov known as JJ (Джей Джей), is a singer, songwriter and vocal producer. He debuted in the popular Bulgarian boy band 032 at the age of 16. In 2013 he began his solo career and released the songs "Po-dobre, che razbrah" and "Dilar na lubov". In 2009 he started teaching pop, soul and RnB singing and has masterclasses in Sofia and Plovdiv. He worked as vocal producer for the albums of one of Bulgaria’s biggest music artists. Every year together with his students he does charity concerts to help children suffering from diabetes, cancer patients, children with disabilities, children with autism and childhood cerebral palsy. In 2014 he took part in The Voice of Summer Tour. He participated in the last edition of X Factor Romania.

=== Vladimir Mihaylov ===
Vladimir Mihaylov, better known as Vlado Mihailov, is Bulgarian singer/songwriter and actor and the front man of the popular Bulgarian groups Safo and Sleng. Prior to being part of Equinox, he was part of the Bulgarian delegation as a backing vocalist for Kristian Kostov in the Eurovision Song Contest 2017. As an actor, he has played in two of Bulgaria’s biggest movies of 2017 – Benzin (Heights) and All She Wrote. He is a co-author and co-producer of all songs by Sleng after joining the band. He is a songwriter for many Bulgarian artists. He was invited to play the leading roles in the Bulgarian production of Mamma Mia!. He has worked as a voice actor in the Bulgarian dubbing of animated films like Frozen, Tangled, or The Muppets, among others.

=== Trey Campbell ===
Trey Campbell is a Los Angeles based songwriter and is one of the composers of "Bones". Trey has written music for artists like Dua Lipa, Bebe Rexha, Julie Bergan and Alexandra Stan. He also co-produced "Truth" by Chingiz, who participated for Azerbaijan in the Eurovision Song Contest 2019.

=== Johnny Manuel ===
Johnny Manuel is originally from Flint, Michigan, United States. Johnny has been a performer since childhood, touring with NSYNC at the age of 14. His performance of Whitney Houston's "I Have Nothing" on America's Got Talent in 2017, where he eventually reached the Semi-Finals after getting the Golden Buzzer from guest judge Seal, accumulated over 270 million views on social media. After America's Got Talent, he released two singles, "Come Alive" and "Blind Faith", and began working on his debut album with Symphonix International. He was also a finalist on the ninth series of The Voice Australia.

The Voice performances and results (2020)
Episode	Song	Original Artist	Result
Audition	"Home"	The Wiz	Through to Battle Rounds
Battle Rounds	"Earth Song"	Michael Jackson	Through to The Play-Offs
The Play-Offs	"Forever Young"	Alphaville	Through to Showdowns
Showdowns	"Before I Go"	Guy Sebastian	Saved by Coach
Semi Final	"A Change Is Gonna Come"	Sam Cooke	Saved by Coach
Grand Final	"My Heart Will Go On"	Céline Dion	Third place
Grand Final	"Black and Gold" (with Guy Sebastian)	Sam Sparro	Third place

== Career ==
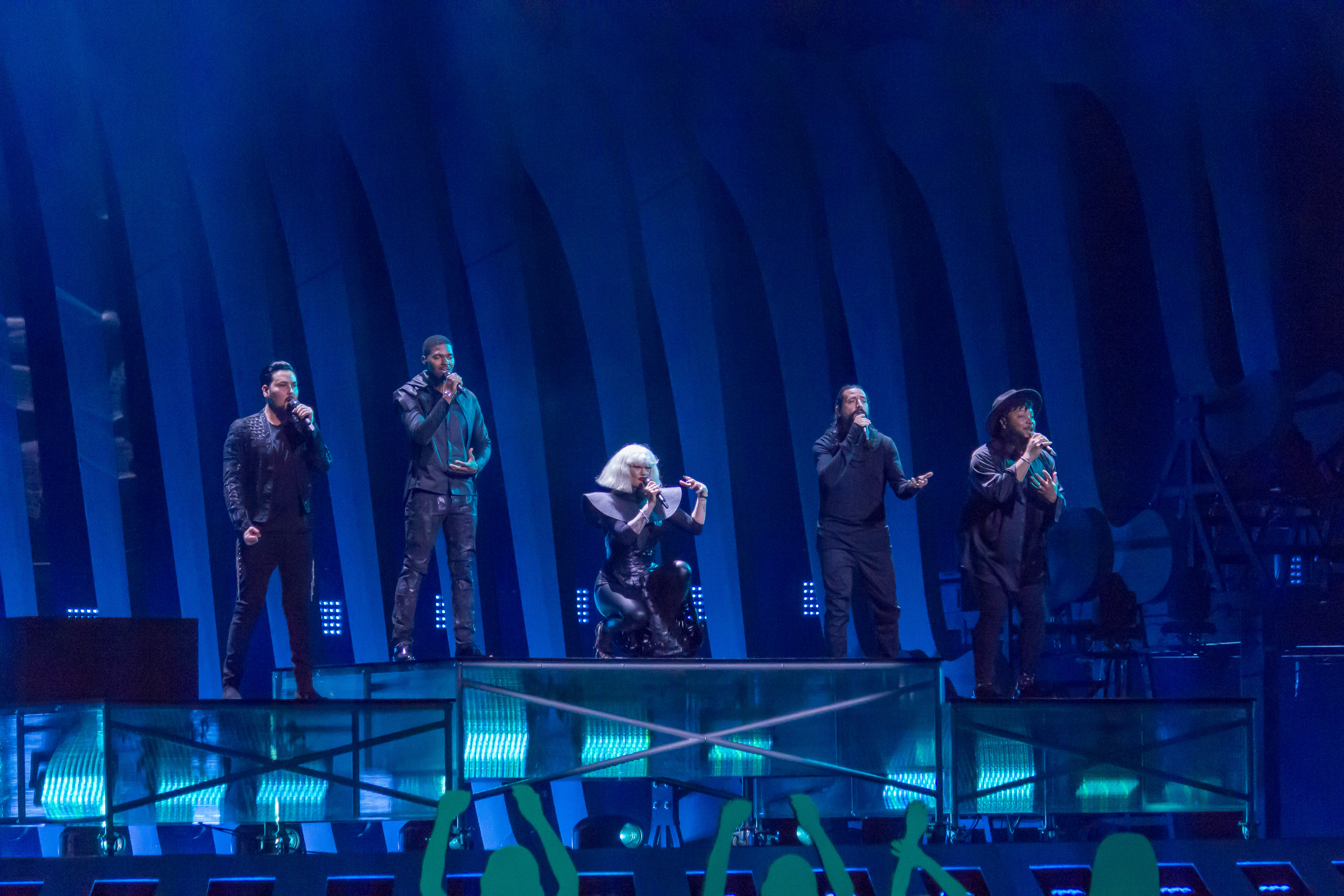
Eurovision Song Contest 2018

On 12 March 2018, it was announced by Bulgarian National Television that Equinox would represent Bulgaria in the Eurovision Song Contest 2018. The song "Bones" is produced by Symphonix International, who were behind Bulgaria's 2016 and 2017 Eurovision entries, which placed 4th and 2nd respectively. The song was composed by Borislav Milanov, Trey Campbell, Joacim Persson and Dag Lundberg. Equinox was created specially for the contest, spearheaded by composer Borislav Milanov. "Bones" eventually qualified for the final, where it placed 14th. Days after the final, the group stated that they would 'continue to exist' after signing with Universal Music Group; however, the group has been inactive since the contest, with its members going on to pursue solo careers.

== Discography ==
=== Singles ===
Title	Year	Peak chart positions		Album
Title	Year	BUL	SWE Heat.	Album
"Bones"	2018	3	4	Non-album single

Awards and achievements
Preceded by Kristian Kostov with "Beautiful Mess"	Bulgaria in the Eurovision Song Contest; 2018	Succeeded by Victoria with "Tears Getting Sober"
