= Szivárvány TV =

Hungarian LGBTQI television channel

Rainbow TV Szivárvány TV
- Szivárvány TV's logo
- Type: LGBTQ
- Country: Hungary

Programming
- Language: Hungarian

History
- Founded: 2026
- Founder: Tamás Pataki

Links
- Website: szivarvanytv.hu

Szivárvány TV (lit. 'Rainbow TV') is a Hungarian linear television channel that focuses on content aimed at LGBTQ people. The channel broadcasts 24 hours a day and publishes content online. It was founded by Tamás Pataki in 2026, although he planned to make an LGBTQ focused television channel in Hungary since 2014, registering the site's domain that year. The channel offers exclusive content for people over the age of eighteen, with restrictions preventing minors from viewing them.

== History ==
Tamás Pataki, the owner of EuroCable Hungary and New Digital Media Kft., had planned to make an LGBTQ focused television channel in Hungary since 2014, with EuroCable registering the 'szivarvanytv.hu' domain with the Council of Internet Service Providers' database that year. In April 2026, the landmark international human rights judgement European Commission v Hungary ruled that the Hungarian anti-LGBTQ law, which was presented as a child-protection measure, was unlawful, violating the Charter of Fundamental Rights of the European Union (CFR), regarding the inviolability of human dignity, respect for private and family life, and freedom of expression and information. A few days after this, the Hungarian media authority National Media and Infocommunications Authority (NMHH) received a license application from a Hungarian company to start the channel. According to Pataki, the timing of the license application shortly and the EU's ruling were related.

Initially, Pataki wanted to keep his status as the founder anonymous until the NMHH decided whether or not to grant their license, although after malicious speculation from Hír TV and other Fidesz associated publications, he revealed himself as the founder on 24 April. NMHH approved and registered the channel on 3 June 2026, making it the first LGBTQ television channel in the country.
