= Victoria Georgieva =

Bulgarian singer (born 1997)

Victoria Georgieva Виктория Георгиева
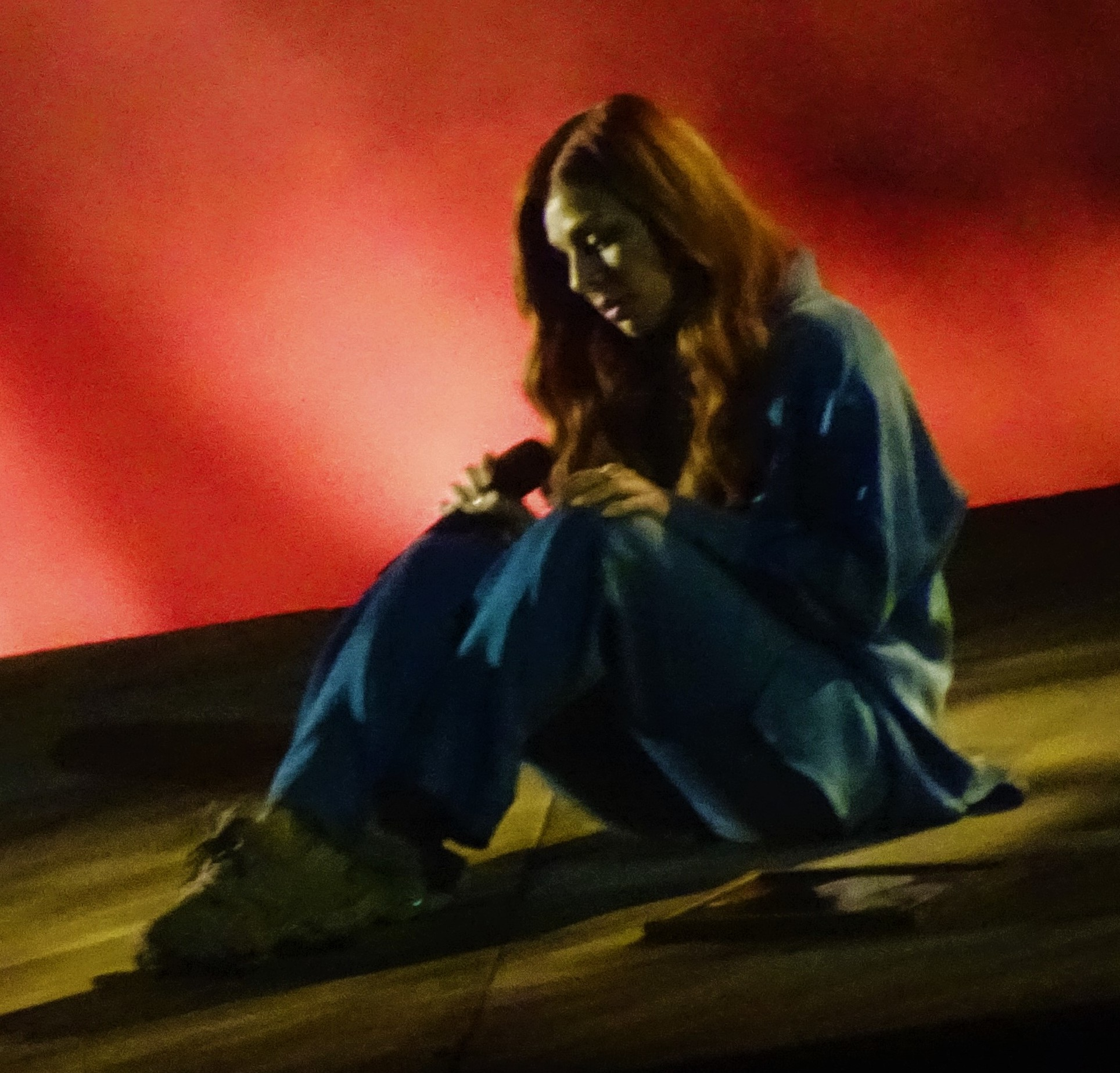
- Georgieva performing in the Eurovision Song Contest 2021

Background information
- Born: Viktoriya Georgieva; 21 September 1997 (age 28); Varna, Bulgaria
- Genres: Pop; R&B; soul
- Occupations: Singer; songwriter
- Instrument: Vocals
- Years active: 2011–present
- Label: Ligna Studios

Viktoriya Georgieva (Bulgarian: Виктория Георгиева; born 21 September 1997), known professionally by the mononym Victoria (stylised in all caps), is a Bulgarian singer and songwriter. She began her career after participating in season four of X Factor Bulgaria. Georgieva would have represented Bulgaria at the Eurovision Song Contest 2020 in Rotterdam, with her song "Tears Getting Sober". Due to the 2020 contest's cancellation, Georgieva represented Bulgaria at the Eurovision Song Contest 2021 instead, this time with "Growing Up Is Getting Old".

== Life and career ==
Georgieva started singing aged 11. After some time she enrolled in the vocal studio "Angel Voices" where her music teacher was Atanaska Lipcheva. Georgieva auditioned for the first 3 seasons of The X Factor Bulgaria, but she never made it past the judges, mostly because of her age.

=== 2015: The X Factor Bulgaria ===
In September 2015, at the fourth season of The X Factor, after three attempts, Georgieva finally made it past the judges and to the live shows. She entered the females team mentored by the rapper Krisko. She remained on the show until week nine, when she was eliminated and ultimately placed sixth.

The X Factor performances and results
Episode	Theme	Song	Result
First audition	Free choice	"One and Only"	Through to bootcamp
Bootcamp	Group Performance	"I'll Be"	Through to Judge's houses
Judges' houses	Free choice	"Sweet Dreams"	Through to live shows
Live show 1	Number ones	"Set Fire to the Rain"	Safe
Live show 2	Halloween	"Read All About It"	Safe
Live show 3	First love	"Hello"	Safe
Live show 4	Bulgarian hits	"Искам те"	Safe
Live show 5	Movie Soundtracks	"Show Me How You Burlesque"	Bottom two
Live show 5	Final showdown	"Who You Are"	Bottom two
Live show 6	Divas and Heroes	"Halo"	Safe
Live show 7	Disco hits	"Hot Stuff"	Safe
Live show 8	International hits	"Camino"	Safe
Christmas show	Christmas edition	"Jingle Bells"	No eliminations
Live show 9	Love is everything	"Titanium"	Left the show (6th)
Live show 9	Love is everything	"Aquarius" (with A.V.A.)	Left the show (6th)
Live show 9	Final showdown	"Rise Up"	Left the show (6th)

=== 2016–2018: Debut single and various record deals ===
Despite failing to win The X Factor, Georgieva received an offer to join Virginia Records, which she declined. Instead, in 2016, she joined MonteMusic and released her first single titled "Nishto Sluchayno", accompanied with a music video directed by Bashmotion and featured VenZy and Niki Bakalov. She then released two other songs with MonteMusic, “Nezavurshen Roman” in 2016 and “Chast ot Men” in 2017. After mutual conflicts, Georgieva left the label in late 2017.

In 2018, Georgieva spent ten days in Los Angeles, California, where she wrote and filmed her first English song “I Wanna Know”, released in June 2019, with a music video directed by Dimitry Stefanov, and produced by Velina Ilieva.

=== 2019–present: Eurovision and international debut ===
On 25 November 2019, it was revealed that Georgieva, now using the mononym Victoria, would represent Bulgaria in the Eurovision Song Contest 2020. She and her sponsor Ligna Group created the song “Tears Getting Sober“, which tells about the inner difficulties in the people, a topic which is very close to Georgieva. Due to the COVID-19 pandemic, the 2020 contest was cancelled, and Georgieva was later retained as the Bulgarian act for the following year's contest.

In June 2020, Georgieva released her new song titled “Alright”. The song was created at one of the Eurovision songwriting camps and carries a message of hope and a new beginning. A few weeks later, in August, she and her team spent ten days in a Eurovision song writing camp held in Burgas and Primorsko, where they managed to create a few potential songs that she could use. In November, she released her third single "Ugly Cry".

In January 2021, Georgieva announced that she would release her debut extended play, titled A Little Dramatic, in February. The project includes five potential songs that could represent Bulgaria at the Eurovision Song Contest 2021. The EP does not include the single "Ugly Cry", however, the song was considered as a potential song to represent Bulgaria. The lead single from the EP, "Imaginary Friend", was released on 14 February. On 11 March, it was announced during a pre-recorded concert premiered on YouTube that the song Victoria would perform is "Growing Up Is Getting Old".

She performed in the second semi-final, where she qualified to the final on 22 May 2021. Ultimately, she received 170 points, finishing 11th.

On 4 December 2021, Georgieva won the third season of The Masked Singer Bulgaria as “Miss”.

== Discography ==
=== Extended plays ===
List of extended plays
Title	Details
A Little Dramatic	Released: 18 June 2021; Label: Ligna Studios; Format: Digital Download, Streaming

=== Singles ===
List of singles, with selected peak chart positions
Title	Year	Peak chart positions		Album
Title	Year	BUL Dom. Air.	SWE Heat.	Album
"Nishto Sluchayno" (featuring Niki Bakalov and VenZy)	2016	—	—	Non-album singles
"Nezavarshen Roman"	2016	—	—	Non-album singles
"Chast Ot Men"	2017	3	—	Non-album singles
"Stranni Vremena"	2018	—	—	Non-album singles
"I Wanna Know"	2019	8	—	Non-album singles
"Tears Getting Sober"	2020	2	—	A Little Dramatic (Note: "Tears Getting Sober", "Alright." and "Ugly Cry" are included on the deluxe version of A Little Dramatic.)
"Alright"	2020	—	—	A Little Dramatic
"Ugly Cry"	2020	3	—	A Little Dramatic
"Growing Up Is Getting Old"	2021	—	16	A Little Dramatic
"The Worst"	2021	—	—	Non-album singles
"How to Ruin a Life"	2022	6	—	Non-album singles
"Were You Ever?"	2022	9	—	Non-album singles
"Lover's Trial"	2023	3	—	Non-album singles
"Bloom"	2023	1	—	Non-album singles
"All I Want for Christmas Is You" (with Aleksander Dębicz)	2023	—	—	Non-album singles
"Paradox"	2024	4	—	Non-album singles
"Sad Girl Summer (Not Again)"	2024	7	—	Non-album singles
"In Between"	2024	9	—	Non-album singles
"Sad Girl Winter (Again)"	2024	—	—	Non-album singles
"Pity Party"	2025	—	—	Non-album singles
"I'll Be There" (with Patryk Skoczyński)	2025	—	—	Non-album singles
"We Don't Get Along"	2025	—	—	Non-album singles
"Ashes"	2026	—	—	Non-album singles
"—" denotes a recording that did not chart or was not released in that territory.

=== Promotional singles ===
List of promotional singles
Title	Year	Album
"Imaginary Friend"	2021	A Little Dramatic
"Dive into Unknown"	2021	A Little Dramatic
"Phantom Pain"	2021	A Little Dramatic
"The Funeral Song"	2021	A Little Dramatic

== Notes ==
Awards and achievements
Preceded by Equinox with "Bones"	Bulgaria in the Eurovision Song Contest; 2020 (cancelled)	Succeeded by Herself with "Growing Up Is Getting Old"
Preceded by Herself with "Tears Getting Sober"	Bulgaria in the Eurovision Song Contest; 2021	Succeeded by Intelligent Music Project with "Intention"
