= Tears Getting Sober =

2020 song by Victoria Georgieva

Single by Victoria

from the album A Little Dramatic (deluxe edition)
- Language: English
- Released: 7 March 2020
- Genre: Dream pop
- Label: Symphonix
- Songwriters: Borislav Milanov; Cornelia Wiebols; Lukas Oscar Janisch; Victoria Georgieva

Victoria singles chronology
"I Wanna Know" (2019)	"Tears Getting Sober" (2020)	"alright." (2020)

Eurovision Song Contest 2020 entry
- Country: Bulgaria
- Artist: Victoria
- Languages: English
- Composers: Borislav Milanov; Cornelia Wiebols; Lukas Oscar Janisch; Victoria Georgieva
- Lyricists: Borislav Milanov; Cornelia Wiebols; Lukas Oscar Janisch; Victoria Georgieva

Finals performance
- Semi-final result: Contest cancelled

Entry chronology
- ◄ "Bones" (2018)
- "Growing Up Is Getting Old" (2021) ►

"Tears Getting Sober" is a song recorded by Bulgarian singer and songwriter Victoria. The song was composed and written by the aforementioned artist together with Borislav Milanov, Cornelia Wiebols and Lukas Oscar Janisch.

The song was scheduled to represent Bulgaria in the Eurovision Song Contest 2020 in Rotterdam, the Netherlands, after being internally selected by the national broadcaster Bulgarian National Television. However, the contest was later cancelled due to the COVID-19 pandemic. After the song was released, the song led the betting odds of winning the contest until the cancellation.

== Background ==
"Tears Getting Sober" was entirely composed and written by Victoria herself, alongside Borislav Milanov, Cornelia Wiebols and Lukas Oscar Janisch. The song is inspired by Milanov's experiences while holding a songwriting camp, where this song was eventually written. It concerns mental health issues and motivate people to fight through their problems, even if they have to do it all by themselves.

== At Eurovision ==
=== Rotterdam ===
The song was scheduled to represent for Bulgaria in the Eurovision Song Contest 2020, after Victoria was internally selected by the national broadcaster, Bulgarian National Television (BNT). On 28 January 2020, a special allocation draw was held which placed each country into one of the two semi-finals, as well as which half of the show they would perform in. Bulgaria was placed into the second semi-final, to be held on 14 May 2020, and was scheduled to perform in the second half of the show.

In March 2020, the European Broadcasting Union cancelled the contest due to the pandemic of the coronavirus disease 2019 (COVID-19) in China and its spread to other countries. Soon after, it was announced that Victoria will represent the country in the Eurovision Song Contest 2021.

== Charts ==
Chart (2020)	Peak position
Bulgaria (PROPHON)	2
