= Bones (Equinox song) =

2018 song by Equinox

Single by Equinox
- Released: 12 March 2018
- Length: 2:59
- Label: Symphonix
- Songwriters: Borislav Milanov; Trey Campbell; Joacim Persson; Dag Lundberg

Music video
- "Bones" on YouTube

Eurovision Song Contest 2018 entry
- Country: Bulgaria
- Artist: Equinox
- Language: English
- Composers: Borislav Milanov; Trey Campbell; Joacim Persson; Dag Lundberg
- Lyricists: Borislav Milanov; Trey Campbell; Joacim Persson; Dag Lundberg

Finals performance
- Semi-final result: 7th
- Semi-final points: 177
- Final result: 14th
- Final points: 166

Entry chronology
- ◄ "Beautiful Mess" (2017)
- "Tears Getting Sober" (2020) ►

"Bones" is a song performed by Bulgarian band Equinox. The song represented Bulgaria in the Eurovision Song Contest 2018. The song was released as a digital download on 12 March 2018 by Symphonix. The song was written by Borislav Milanov, Trey Campbell, Joacim Persson and Dag Lundberg.

== Eurovision Song Contest ==
It represented Bulgaria in the Eurovision Song Contest 2018. BNT organised an internal selection process in order to select Bulgaria's entry for the Eurovision Song Contest. Producers, artists and songwriters were able to submit their entries from 14 November 2017 to 29 December 2017. BNT received a record number of 202 songs, and BNT determined there were thirteen "workable projects". On 30 December 2017, BNT revealed the song titles of the thirteen projects that would compete to be selected. The thirteen songs were evaluated by various focus voting groups. After receiving the feedback and results from the focus groups, the number of competing projects was shortlisted to three on 18 January 2018. The winner was set to be determined by 31 January 2018, though the official announcement was made on 12 March 2018.

The song competed in the first semi-final, held on 8 May 2018 in Lisbon, Portugal, where it placed 7th out of 19 with 107 points from the jury and 70 points from the public, totaling 177 points.

Following their performance, Equinox attended a press conference during which the contestants drew which half of the final they would be performing in. Bulgaria was drawn to compete in the second half.

In the grand final, Bones was the 18th song to compete. It placed 14th out of 26 with 100 points from the jury and 66 points from the public, totaling 166 points.

== Track listing ==
Digital download
No.	Title	Length
1.	"Bones" (Studio Version)	2:59
2.	"Bones" (Karaoke Version)	2:59
3.	"Bones" (Instrumental Version)	2:59

== Charts ==
Chart performance for "Bones"
Chart (2018)	Peak position
Greece Digital Singles (IFPI Greece)	50
Sweden Heatseeker (Sverigetopplistan)	4

== Release history ==
Release history for "Bones"
Region	Date	Format	Label
Various	12 March 2018	Digital download	Symphonix
