= Salvador Sobral discography =

Artist discography

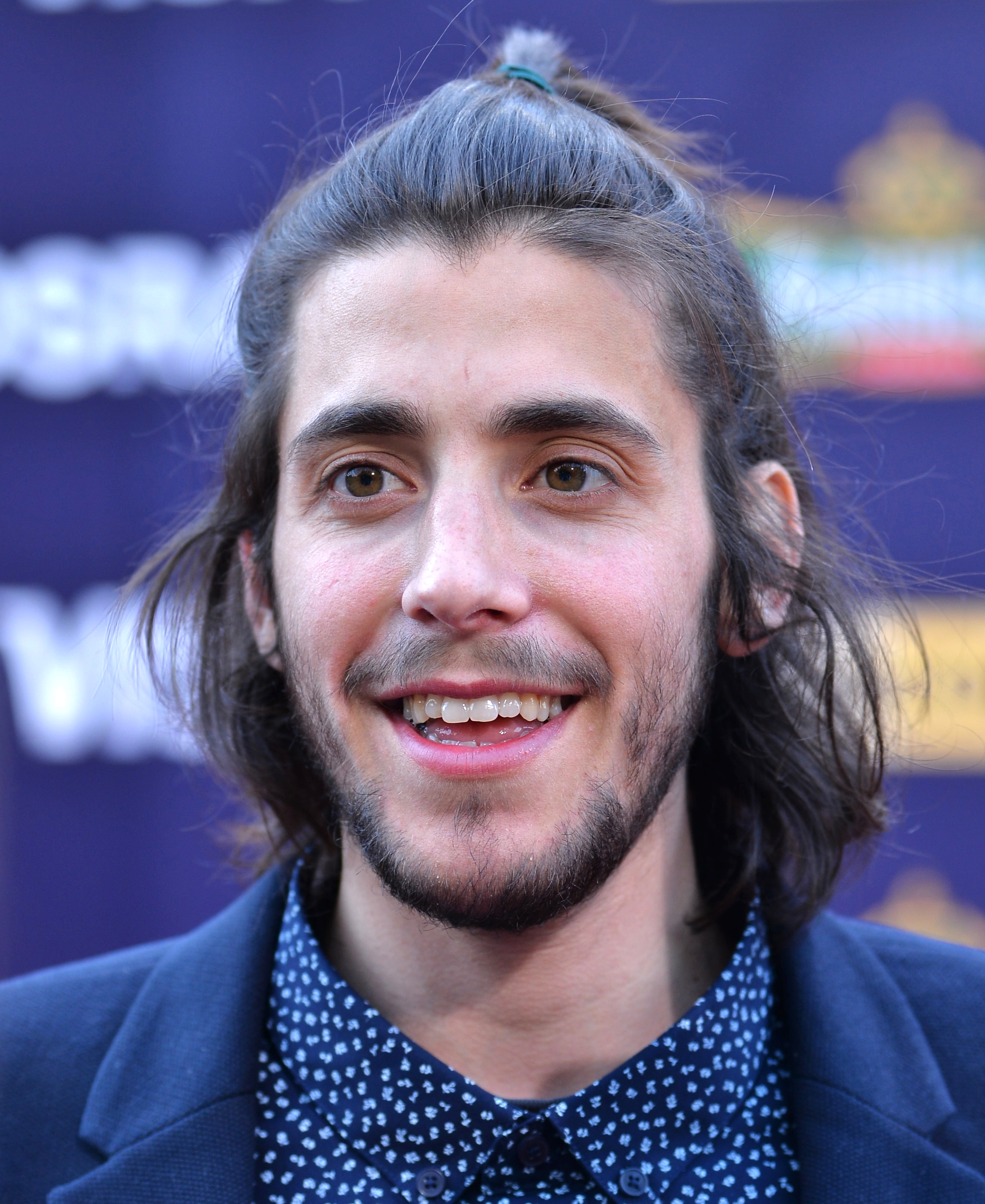
- Sobral on the Eurovision Song Contest red carpet in Kyiv (2017).

This is the discography of Portuguese singer Salvador Sobral. In August 2016, Sobral released his debut studio album Excuse Me, which includes the singles "Excuse Me" and "Nem Eu". The album peaked at number one on the Portuguese Albums Chart. He won the Eurovision Song Contest 2017 for Portugal with the song "Amar pelos dois". He gave Portugal its first ever win in the contest since its debut in 1964, ending the longest winless run by a country in Eurovision history (53 years). In November 2017, he released his debut live album, Excuse Me (Ao Vivo). The album peaked at number two on the Portuguese Albums Chart. In March 2019, he released his second studio album Paris, Lisboa, which includes the singles "Mano a Mano", "Cerca del Mar" and "Anda Estragar-me os Planos". The album peaked at number one on the Portuguese Albums Chart.

== Albums ==
=== Studio albums ===
List of studio albums, with selected details and chart positions
Title	Details	Peak chart positions						
Title	Details	POR	AUT	BEL (Fl)	BEL (Wa)	NLD	SPA	SWI
Excuse Me	Released: 2 August 2016; Label: Edições Valentim de Carvalho; Formats: Digital download, CD	1	65	23	92	35	38	31
Alexander Search (with the band Alexander Search)	Released: 30 June 2017; Label: Sony Music; Formats: Digital download, streaming, CD	3	—	—	—	—	—	—
Paris, Lisboa	Released: 29 March 2019; Label: Edições Valentim de Carvalho (Portugal) Warner Music Spain (Rest of the world); Formats: Digital download, CD	1	—	—	—	—	29	—
Alma nuestra (with Victor Zamora, Nelson Cascais & André Sousa Machado)	Released: 26 June 2020; Label: Força de Produção; Formats: Digital download, CD	—	—	—	—	—	—	—
BPM	Released: 28 May 2021; Label: Warner Music; Formats: Digital download, streaming, CD	1	—	—	—	—	—	—
Timbre	Released: 29 September 2023; Label: Warner Music; Formats: Digital download, streaming, CD	2	—	—	—	—	—	—
A flor da recomeço	Released: 16 October 2026; Label: Warner Music Spain; Formats: Digital download, streaming	37	—	—	—	—	—	—
"—" denotes a recording that did not chart or was not released.

=== Live albums ===
Title	Details	Peak chart positions
Title	Details	POR
Excuse Me (Ao Vivo)	Released: 15 December 2017; Label: Edições Valentim de Carvalho; Formats: Digital download, CD	2

== Singles ==
Title	Year	Peak chart positions										Certifications	Album
Title	Year	POR	AUT	BEL (Fl)	FRA	GER	NLD	SPA	SWE	SWI	UK	Certifications	Album
"Excuse Me"	2016	22	—	—	—	—	—	—	—	—	—		Excuse Me
"Nem Eu"	2016	25	—	—	—	—	—	—	—	—	—		Excuse Me
"Amar pelos dois"	2017	1	22	30	4	43	35	35	33	6	97	AFP: Platinum	Non-album single
"Mano a Mano"	2018	84	—	—	—	—	—	—	—	—	—		Paris, Lisboa
"Cerca del Mar"	2018	—	—	—	—	—	—	—	—	—	—		Paris, Lisboa
"Anda Estragar-me os Planos"	2019	—	—	—	—	—	—	—	—	—	—		Paris, Lisboa
"Tú me acostumbraste" (with Alma Nuestra)	2020	—	—	—	—	—	—	—	—	—	—		Alma nuestra
"Tú mi delirio" (with Alma Nuestra)	2020	—	—	—	—	—	—	—	—	—	—		Alma nuestra
"Sangue do meu sangue"	2021	—	—	—	—	—	—	—	—	—	—		BPM
"Paint the Town"	2021	—	—	—	—	—	—	—	—	—	—		BPM
"Pedra Quente"	2023	—	—	—	—	—	—	—	—	—	—		Timbre
"—" denotes a recording that did not chart or was not released.

== Other charted songs ==
Title	Year	Peak chart positions	Album
Title	Year	POR	Album
"Nada Que Esperar"	2017	56	Excuse Me
"Ready for Love Again"	2017	61	Excuse Me
"After You've Gone"	2017	64	Excuse Me
"Change"	2017	70	Excuse Me
"Autumn in New York"	2017	79	Excuse Me
"Ay Amor"	2017	88	Excuse Me
"Something Real"	2017	91	Excuse Me
