= Excuse Me =

Excuse Me may refer to:

== Arts and entertainment ==
- Excuse Me, a 1911 play by Rupert Hughes
- Excuse Me (1915 film), an American silent comedy film based on the play by Rupert Hughes
- Excuse Me (1925 film), an American silent comedy film based on the play by Rupert Hughes
- Excuse Me (2003 film), an Indian Kannada-language romantic drama film
- Xcuse Me, a 2003 Indian Hindi-language comedy film

== Music ==
- Excuse Me (album), by Salvador Sobral, 2016
- Excuse Me (Ao Vivo), an album by Salvador Sobral, 2017
- "Excuse Me" (Jazmine Sullivan song), 2011
- "Excuse Me" (Salvador Sobral song), 2016
- "Excuse Me (I Think I've Got a Heartache)", a song by Buck Owens, 1960
- "Excuse Me", a song by AOA from Angel's Knock, 2017
- "Excuse Me", a song by Bestie, 2015
- "Excuse Me", a song by Kiki Dee, 1967
- "Excuse Me", a song by Peter Gabriel from Peter Gabriel, 1977
- "Excuse Me", a song by the Linda Lindas from No Obligation, 2024

== Comedy and catchphrases ==
- "Excuse Me", a comedy routine by Steve Martin that appeared on his 1977 album Let's Get Small and later became a catchphrase
- "Excuse me, princess!", a catchphrase of the video game character Link (The Legend of Zelda)

== See also ==
- Excuse, a defense to criminal charges
