= Paris, Lisboa =

Studio album by Salvador Sobral
- Released: 29 March 2019
- Recorded: 2018
- Genre: Jazz
- Label: Edições Valentim de Carvalho; Warner Music Spain
- Producer: Joel Silva

Salvador Sobral chronology
Excuse Me (Ao Vivo) (2017)	Paris, Lisboa (2020)	Alma nuestra (2020)

Salvador Sobral studio album chronology
Excuse Me (2016)	Paris, Lisboa (2019)	bpm (2021)

Singles from Paris, Lisboa
- 1. "Mano a Mano" Released: 11 May 2018; 2. "Cerca del Mar" Released: 6 July 2018; 3. "Anda Estragar-me os Planos" Released: 8 March 2019

Paris, Lisboa is the second studio album by the Portuguese singer Salvador Sobral. It was released in Portugal on 29 March 2019 by Edições Valentim de Carvalho. The album peaked at number 1 on the Portuguese Albums Chart, and at number 11 on the Spanish Albums Chart. The album includes the singles "Mano a Mano", "Cerca del Mar" and "Anda Estragar-me os Planos".

== Background ==
He sings four languages on the album. In an interview he spoke of his successful heart transplant operation and how it encouraged him to begin working on his second studio album, he said, "I’m here after all, this will continue. If everything goes well it’s better to start thinking of a new record!"

== Singles ==
"Mano a Mano" was released as the lead single from the album on 11 May 2018. The song peaked at number 84 on the Portuguese Singles Chart. On 12 May 2018 he performed the song live at the final of the Eurovision Song Contest 2018 with Caetano Veloso. "Cerca del Mar" was released as the second single from the album on 6 July 2018. "Anda Estragar-me os Planos" was released as the third single from the album on 8 March 2019.

== Track listing ==
No.	Title	Writer(s)	Producer(s)	Length
1.	"180, 181 (Catarse)"	Salvador Sobral; Leonardo Aldrey	Joel Silva	3:21
2.	"Presságio"	Fernando Pessoa; Júlio Resende	Silva	4:13
3.	"Cerca del Mar"	Aldrey	Silva	4:33
4.	"Ela Disse-me Assim"	Lupicínio Rodrigues	Silva	3:45
5.	"Playing with the Wind"	S. Sobral; Aldrey	Silva	4:34
6.	"Prometo Não Prometer" (feat. Luísa Sobral)	Luísa Sobral	Silva	2:38
7.	"Benjamin"	S. Sobral; André Rosinha	Silva	3:54
8.	"Grandes Ilusiones"	S. Sobral; Rosinha; Silva	Silva	3:51
9.	"Mano a Mano" (reprise feat. António Zambujo)	Maria Do Rosário Pedreira; Rosinha	Silva	2:38
10.	"La Souffleuse"	Silva; Jenna Thiam	Silva	2:50
11.	"Paris, Tokyo II"	S. Sobral; Silva	Silva	3:53
12.	"Anda Estragar-me os Planos"	Afonso Cabral; Francisca Cortesão	Silva	2:46

== Charts ==
Chart (2019)	Peak position
Portuguese Albums (AFP)	1
Spanish Albums (PROMUSICAE)	11

== Release history ==
Region	Date	Format	Label
Portugal	29 March 2019	Digital download	Edições Valentim de Carvalho
