= Hermano José Braamcamp de Almeida Castelo Branco =

Portuguese nobleman and politician

His Excellency The Count of Sobral ComC
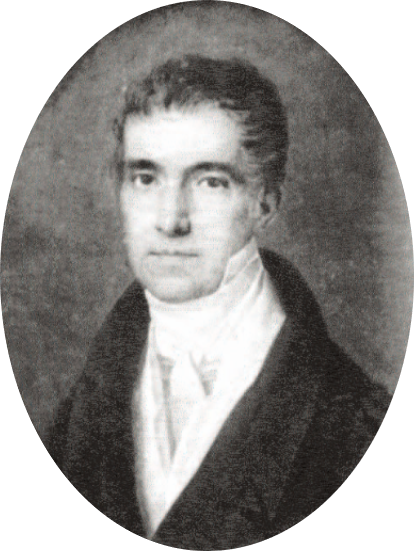

Secretary of State for the Exchequer
- In office 1 August 1826 – 8 June 1827
- Monarch: Isabel Maria, Regent
- Preceded by: The Count of Murça
- Succeeded by: The Count of Lousã

Secretary of State for Foreign Affairs
- In office 28 May 1823 – 30 May 1823
- Monarch: John VI
- Preceded by: Silvestre Pinheiro Ferreira
- Succeeded by: Francisco de Oliveira

Personal details
- Born: 16 September 1775 Lisbon, Portugal
- Died: 2 February 1846 (aged 70) Lisbon, Portugal

Hermano José Braamcamp de Almeida Castelo-Branco, 5th Lord, 2nd Baron, 1st Viscount and 1st Count of Sobral, 5th Lord of the Majorat of Sobral, 3rd Lord of the Majorat of Luz, ComC (16 September 1775 – 2 February 1846), Chief of the Name and Arms of da Cruz Sobral, was a Portuguese nobleman and politician.

== Family ==
He was the first of six children and son of Geraldo Venceslau Braamcamp de Almeida Castelo-Branco and Joana Maria da Cruz Sobral. Geraldo was the 4th Lord jure uxoris and 1st Baron of Sobral, 2nd Lord and Administrator of the Majorat of a Luz (28 September 1752 – 6 July 1828), of the Counsel of Queen Maria I and King Peter III, Deputy of the Board of Commerce (Junta do Comércio), Commander of the Order of Christ and 1st Baron of Sobral by Decree of 14 May 1813 of Prince Regent John, who succeeded his mother in the Majorat of Luz. Joana Maria da Cruz Sobral was the 4th Lady of the Village of Sobral de Monte Agraço, 4th Lady and Administrator of the Majorat of Sobral and Chief of the Name and Arms of da Cruz Sobral (born or bap. 9 June 1760 – 21 October 1812), of Italian maternal descent, who succeeded her brother Sebastião António da Cruz Sobral, 3rd Lord of Sobral and 3rd Lord of the Majorat of Sobral, Chief of the Name and Arms of da Cruz Sobral, Alcaide-Major of Freixo de Numão, Nobleman of the Royal Household, of the Counsel of Queen Maria I, Commander of the Order of Christ, Alderman of the Senate of the Chamber of Lisbon, Counselor of the Royal Treasury, Fiscal of Public Works (born 22 September 1757 or bap. 23 December 1758 and brother of Leonor Clara da Cruz Sobral, born 6 August 1781). Hermano's parents married on 20 February 1773.

== Life and political career ==
Bachelor in Law from University of Coimbra, he was 5th Lord of Sobral de Monte Agraço and 5th Lord of the Majorat of Sobral, succeeding his mother, who ceded them to him in 1806, and 3rd Lord of the Majorat of a Luz, succeeding his father on 6 July 1828. He enlisted as Captain in the Cavalry Regiment of the Pier of Lisbon on 30 September 1796, for having presented a Cavalry Company at his own expense, which became adstricted to the same Regiment, and had leave from the service on 3 March 1803.

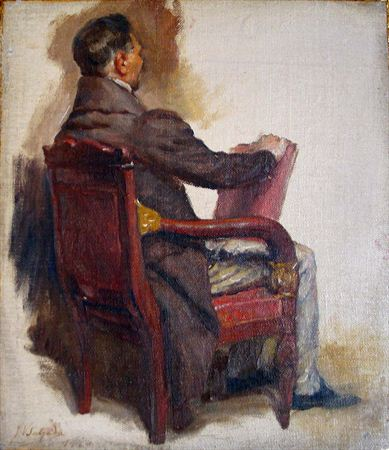
Study for the painting The Constituent Courts of 1821, by Veloso Salgado (1920), depicting Hermano José Braamcamp. The painting was commissioned to adorn the Hall of Sessions of the Portuguese Parliament.

He took an active part in the liberal politics and was appointed, after the Liberal Revolution of 1820 in Porto as a Member of the Provisional Regency of the Government of the Realm, then instituted (merged later with the one of Porto). Withdrawn in 1823 from the public businesses, after the Vilafrancada he returned to the political activity when, in 1826, the Constitutional Charter was sworn, under the Regency of Infanta Isabel Maria of Portugal, becoming part, as 24th Secretary of State of the Treasury Affairs or Minister of the Treasury, of a constitutional government, in which Saldanha was Minister of War. Miguel's coup, proclaiming himself King, withdrew him again from politics. In 1833, after the victory of the liberal forces, he was appointed Member of the Commission created to take knowledge in charge of the study of the state of the consolidated external debt, etc., on 18 July 1838. He also became a Peer of the Realm in 1835, Honorary Minister and Counselor of State and Commander of the Order of Christ.

The title of Baron was renewed to him by Decree of 3 March 1824 of John VI during his father's lifetime, and was raised to Viscount, with Grandee status, by Decree of 14 September 1838 and then to Count by Decree of 13 December 1844, both of Maria II. He owned a palace at the Largo do Calhariz and a farm on a Luz. His coat of arms was quartered, on the first de Narbonne, on the second de Almeida, on the third Castelo-Branco and on the fourth patterned of da Cruz Sobral and Braamcamp, with a crest of de Narbonne and a coronet of Duke (allusive to the representation of the ducat de Narbonne-Lara and, more accurately, to the Grandeeship of Spain 1st Class). Motto: Labor vincit aerumnas.

== Marriage and issue ==
He married at Agen on 17 February 1806 Louise Amable Rion Françoise de Narbonne-Lara (Nice, 25 May 1786 – Lisbon, 28 March 1849), Dame of Honour of Her Majesty Queen Maria II (with right to the Grandeeship of Spain 1st Class for being representative of her paternal uncle the 2e duc de Narbonne-Lara, of whom she was the heiress for him not having posterity), first-born daughter of Louis Marie Jacques Amalric, comte de Narbonne-Lara and Adélaïde Marie de Montholon, and had issue, two daughters:

- Adelaide Braamcamp Sobral de Almeida Castelo-Branco de Narbonne-Lara, 6th Lady, 3rd Baroness, 2nd Viscountess and 2nd Countess of Sobral, 6th and last Lady of the Majorat of Sobral, 4th and last Lady of the Majorat of a Luz (Paris, 3 June 1808 – Lisbon, 15 June 1886), Dame of Her Majesty Queen Maria II, married in Lisbon, Carnide, on 2 or 6 October 1834 to Luís Maria de Melo Breyner Teles da Silva (Lisbon, Mercês, 26 October 1807 – Lisbon, Mercês, 1 December 1876), Moço Fidalgo of the Royal Household, Knight of the Order of the Tower and Sword and the Order of Aviz, Lieutenant of Cavalry who was an Attaché to the Chiefs of Staff of His Imperial Majesty the Duke of Braganza and His Royal Highness Prince Auguste, Aide-de-Camp of His Royal Majesty King Ferdinand, second son of the 5th Lord and 2nd Count and the 1st Marchioness and 1st Duchess of Ficalho and brother of his sister in law's husband, and had five children (he also had a natural son, born before wedlock)
- Maria Luísa Braamcamp Sobral de Almeida Castelo-Branco de Narbonne-Lara (Paris, 2 October 1812 – Lisbon, Mercês, 19 August 1890), married in Lisbon, Carnide, 14 September 1834 to António José de Melo Breyner Teles da Silva, 3rd Count and 2nd Marquess of Ficalho (Lisbon, Mercês, 22 August 1806 – Lisbon, Mercês, 27 April 1893), 160th Grand Cross of the Order of the Tower and Sword, son of the 5th Lord and 2nd Count and the 1st Marchioness and 1st Duchess of Ficalho and brother of his sister in law's husband, and had two sons

Two of his descendants are Salvador and Luísa Sobral, the winner and winning songwriter of the Eurovision Song Contest 2017. They also share the family name of Braamcamp Sobral.
