= Portugal in the Eurovision Song Contest 2015 =

- Eurovision Song Contest 2015
- Participating broadcaster: Rádio e Televisão de Portugal (RTP)
- Country: Portugal
- Selection process: Festival da Canção 2015
- Selection date: 7 March 2015

Competing entry
- Song: "Há um mar que nos separa"
- Artist: Leonor Andrade
- Songwriters: Miguel Gameiro

Placement
- Semi-final result: Failed to qualify (14th)

Participation chronology

Portugal was represented at the Eurovision Song Contest 2015 with the song "Há um mar que nos separa" written by Miguel Gameiro, and performed by Leonor Andrade. The Portuguese participating broadcaster, Rádio e Televisão de Portugal (RTP), organised the national final Festival da Canção 2015 in order to select its entry for the contest. After two semi-finals and a final which took place in March 2015, "Há um mar que nos separa" performed by Leonor Andrade emerged as the winner after receiving the most public televotes.

Portugal was drawn to compete in the second semi-final of the Eurovision Song Contest which took place on 21 May 2015. Performing during the show in position 7, "Há um mar que nos separa" was not announced among the top 10 entries of the first semi-final and therefore did not qualify to compete in the final. It was later revealed that Portugal placed fourteenth out of the 17 participating countries in the semi-final with 19 points.

== Background ==
Prior to the 2015 contest, Radiotelevisão Portuguesa (RTP) until 2003, and Rádio e Televisão de Portugal (RTP) since 2004, had participated in the Eurovision Song Contest representing Portugal forty-seven times since their first entry in 1964. Their highest placing in the contest was sixth, achieved in 1996 with the song "O meu coração não tem cor" performed by Lúcia Moniz. Following the introduction of semi-finals for the 2004, Portugal had featured in only three finals. Their least successful result has been last place, achieved on three occasions, most recently in 1997 with the song "Antes do adeus" performed by Célia Lawson. They have also received nul points on two occasions: in 1964 and 1997. The nation failed to qualify to the final in 2014 with the song "Quero ser tua" performed by Suzy.

As part of its duties as participating broadcaster, RTP organises the selection of its entry in the Eurovision Song Contest and broadcasts the event in the country. The broadcaster confirmed its participation in the 2015 contest on 29 July 2014. RTP has traditionally selected its entry for the contest via the music competition Festival da Canção, with exceptions in 1988 and in 2005 when the entries were internally selected. Along with its participation confirmation, RTP revealed details regarding their selection procedure and announced the organization of Festival da Canção 2015 in order to select its 2015 entry.

== Before Eurovision ==
=== Festival da Canção 2015 ===
The logo of Festival da Canção 2015

Festival da Canção 2015 was the 50th edition of Festival da Canção that selected Portugal's entry for the Eurovision Song Contest 2015. Twelve entries competed in the competition that consisted of two semi-finals held on 3 and 5 March 2015 leading to a six-song final on 7 March 2015. All three shows of the competition took place at RTP's Studio 2 in Lisbon and were broadcast on RTP1, RTP África and RTP Internacional as well as online via the broadcaster's official website rtp.pt.

==== Format ====
The format of the competition consisted of three shows: two semi-finals on 3 and 5 March 2015 and the final on 7 March 2015. Each semi-final featured six competing entries from which three advanced from each show to complete the eight song lineup in the final. Results during the semi-finals and the final were determined by a jury panel appointed by the competing composers in their respective semi-finals and public televoting. In each semi-final, the songs first faced a public televote from which two advanced to the final. The jury then selected an additional qualifier from the remaining entries to proceed in the competition. In the final, the songs first faced a public televote from which two advanced to a second round of voting, the superfinal. The jury then selected an additional qualifier from the remaining entries to proceed to the superfinal, during which a public televote exclusively determined which entry would be the winner.

==== Competing entries ====
Twelve composers were invited by RTP for the competition. The composers, which both created the songs and selected its performers, were required to submit the final versions of their entries by 5 February 2015. Songs were required to be submitted in Portuguese. The selected composers were:

- Adelaide Ferreira
- Augusto Madureira
- Carlos Massa
- Diogo Rodrigues (Churky)
- Fernando Abrantes
- Gonçalo Tavares
- Héber Marques
- Miguel Gameiro
- Nuno Feist
- Renato Júnior
- Sara Tavares
- Sebastião Antunes

The competing artists were revealed on 19 February 2015. Among the competing artists were former Eurovision Song Contest entrants Simone de Oliveira, who represented Portugal in 1965 and 1969 contests, and Adelaide Ferreira, who represented Portugal in the 1985 contest.

Artist	Song	Songwriter(s)
Adelaide Ferreira	"Paz"	Adelaide Ferreira
Diana Piedade	"Maldito tempo"	Carlos Massa
Filipa Baptista	"A noite inteira"	Augusto Madureira
Filipe Gonçalves	"Dança Joana"	Héber Marques
Gonçalo Tavares	"Tu tens uma mágica"	Gonçalo Tavares, José Cid
José Freitas	"Mal menor (ninguém me guia à razão)"	Churky
Leonor Andrade	"Há um mar que nos separa"	Miguel Gameiro
Rita Seidi	"Lisboa, Lisboa"	Sara Tavares, Kalaf
Rubi Machado	"Quando a lua voltar a passar"	Sebastião Antunes
Simone de Oliveira	"À espera das canções"	Renato Júnior, Tiango Torres da Silva
Teresa Radamanto	"Um fado em Viena"	Fernando Abrantes, Jorge Mangorrinha
Yola Dinis	"Outra vez primavera"	Nuno Feist, Marques da Silva

==== Semi-finals ====
The two semi-finals took place on 3 and 5 March 2015. The first semi-final was hosted by Joana Teles and Jorge Gabriel while the second semi-final was hosted by Sílvia Alberto and José Carlos Malato. In each semi-final six entries competed and three advanced to the final. The competing entries first faced a public televote where the top two songs advanced, with an additional qualifier selected from the remaining four entries by a jury panel.

In addition to the performances of the competing entries, Portuguese Eurovision 1964 entrant António Calvário and Portuguese Eurovision 2014 entrant Suzy performed as the interval acts in the first semi-final, while Eládio Clímaco and Portuguese Eurovision 1996 entrant Lucia Móniz performed as the interval acts in the second semi-final.

Public vote qualifier Jury qualifier

Semi-final 1 – 3 March 2015
R/O	Artist	Song	Place	Result
1	Rita Seidi	"Lisboa, Lisboa"	6	—N/a
2	Leonor Andrade	"Há um mar que nos separa"	1	Advanced
3	Filipa Baptista	"A noite inteira"	3	—N/a
4	Yola Dinis	"Outra vez primavera"	2	Advanced
5	Gonçalo Tavares	"Tu tens uma mágica"	5	Advanced
6	Adelaide Ferreira	"Paz"	4	—N/a

Semi-final 2 – 5 March 2015
R/O	Artist	Song	Place	Result
1	Rubi Machado	"Quando a lua voltar a passar"	6	—N/a
2	José Freitas	"Mal menor (ninguém me guia à razão)"	5	Advanced
3	Teresa Radamanto	"Um fado em Viena"	1	Advanced
4	Simone de Oliveira	"À espera das canções"	2	Advanced
5	Filipe Gonçalves	"Dança Joana"	3	—N/a
6	Diana Piedade	"Maldito tempo"	4	—N/a

==== Final ====
The final took place on 7 March 2015, hosted by Júlio Isidro and Catarina Furtado. The winner was selected over two rounds of voting. In the first round, the six competing entries that qualified from the two preceding semi-finals first faced a public televote where the top two songs advanced to the second round, the superfinal, with an additional qualifier was selected from the remaining four entries by a jury panel. In the superfinal, the winner, "Há um mar que nos separa" performed by Leonor Andrade, was selected solely by a public televote. Agir and Portuguese Eurovision 1974 entrant Paulo de Carvalho performed as the interval acts.

Public vote qualifier Jury qualifier

Final – 7 March 2015
R/O	Artist	Song	Place	Result
1	José Freitas	"Mal menor (ninguém me guia à razão)"	6	—N/a
2	Yola Dinis	"Outra vez primavera"	4	—N/a
3	Leonor Andrade	"Há um mar que nos separa"	1	Advanced
4	Simone de Oliveira	"À espera das canções"	3	—N/a
5	Teresa Radamanto	"Um fado em Viena"	2	Advanced
6	Gonçalo Tavares	"Tu tens uma mágica"	5	Advanced

Superfinal – 7 March 2015
R/O	Artist	Song	Place
1	Leonor Andrade	"Há um mar que nos separa"	1
2	Teresa Radamanto	"Um fado em Viena"	2
3	Gonçalo Tavares	"Tu tens uma mágica"	3

== At Eurovision ==
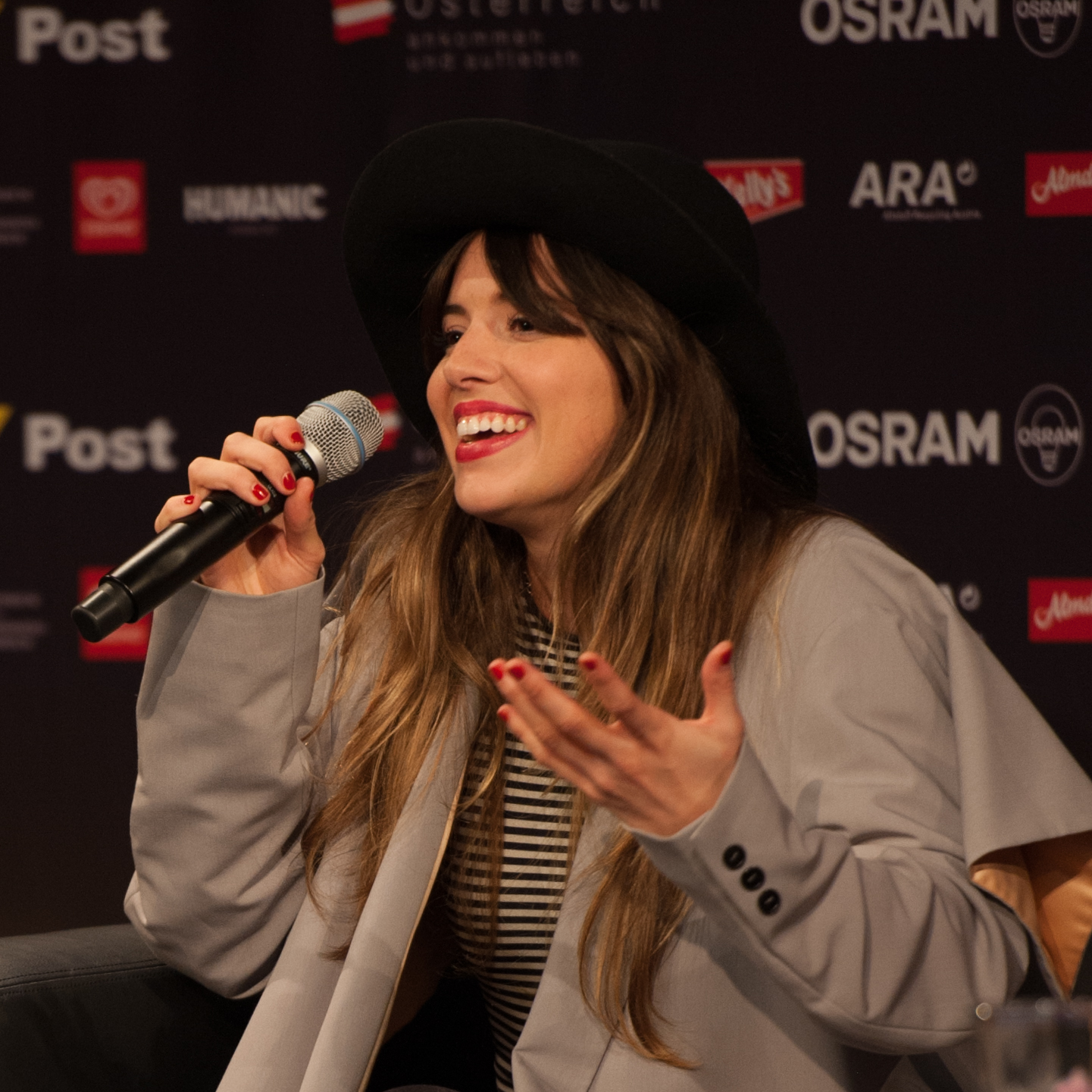
Leonor Andrade during a press meet and greet

According to Eurovision rules, all nations with the exceptions of the host country and the "Big Five" (France, Germany, Italy, Spain and the United Kingdom) are required to qualify from one of two semi-finals in order to compete for the final; the top ten countries from each semi-final progress to the final. In the 2015 contest, Australia also competed directly in the final as an invited guest nation. The European Broadcasting Union (EBU) split up the competing countries into six different pots based on voting patterns from previous contests, with countries with favourable voting histories put into the same pot. On 26 January 2015, a special allocation draw was held which placed each country into one of the two semi-finals, as well as which half of the show they would perform in. Portugal was placed into the second semi-final, to be held on 21 May 2015, and was scheduled to perform in the first half of the show.

Once all the competing songs for the 2015 contest had been released, the running order for the semi-finals was decided by the shows' producers rather than through another draw, so that similar songs were not placed next to each other. Portugal was set to perform in position 7, following the entry from Norway and before the entry from Czech Republic.

In Portugal, the three shows were broadcast on RTP1 and RTP Internacional with commentary by Hélder Reis and Ramon Galarza. The second semi-final and the final were broadcast live, while the first semi-final was broadcast on delay. The Portuguese spokesperson, who announced the Portuguese votes during the final, was 2014 contest entrant Suzy.

=== Semi-final ===
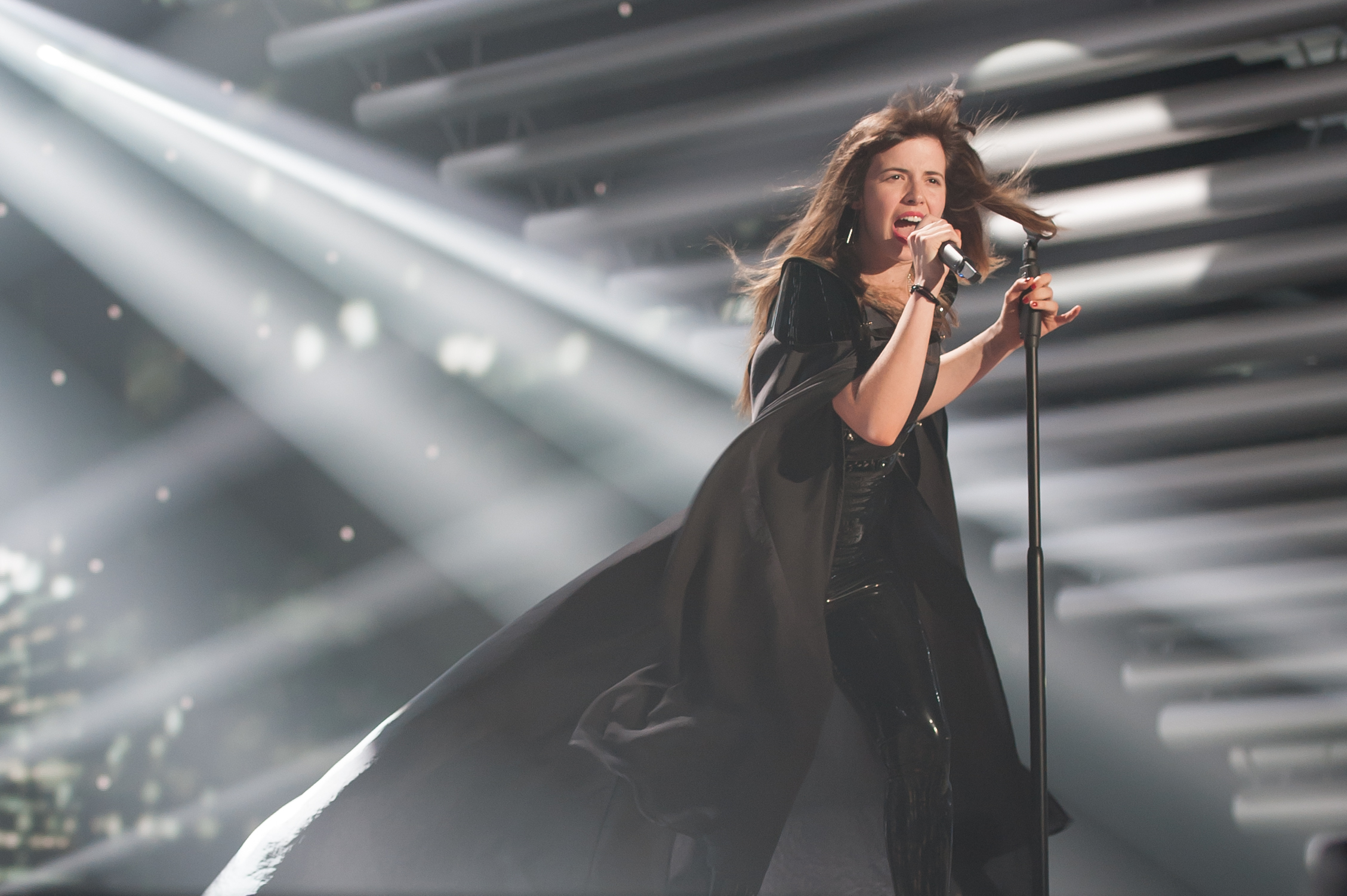
Leonor Andrade during a rehearsal before the second semi-final

Leonor Andrade took part in technical rehearsals on 13 and 16 May, followed by dress rehearsals on 20 and 21 May. This included the jury final where professional juries of each country watched and voted on the competing entries.

The Portuguese performance featured Leonor Andrade dressed in a black leather outfit with flowing trains performing at a microphone stand with a wind machine special effect. Four backing vocalists were lined up on Andrade's side also dressed in black: Pedro Mimoso, Ricardo Quintas, Tânia Tavares and Carla Ribeiro. The LED screens displayed images of a large city which transitioned to waves in blue, black and white.

At the end of the show, Portugal failed to qualify to the final and was not announced among the top ten nations. It was later revealed that Portugal placed fourteenth in the semi-final, receiving a total of 19 points.

=== Voting ===
Voting during the three shows involved each country awarding points from 1-8, 10 and 12 as determined by a combination of 50% national jury and 50% televoting. Each nation's jury consisted of five music industry professionals who were citizens of the country they represent, with their names published before the contest to ensure transparency. This jury was asked to judge each contestant based on: vocal capacity; the stage performance; the song's composition and originality; and the overall impression by the act. In addition, no member of a national jury could be related in any way to any of the competing acts in such a way that they cannot vote impartially and independently. The individual rankings of each jury member were released shortly after the grand final.

Following the release of the full split voting by the EBU after the conclusion of the competition, it was revealed that Portugal had placed thirteenth with both the public televote and the jury vote in the second semi-final. In the public vote, Portugal scored 24 points, while with the jury vote, Portugal scored 23 points.

Below is a breakdown of points awarded to Portugal and awarded by Portugal in the second semi-final and grand final of the contest, and the breakdown of the jury voting and televoting conducted during the two shows:

==== Points awarded to Portugal ====
Points awarded to Portugal (Semi-final 2)
Score	Country
12 points	
10 points	
8 points	
7 points	
6 points	Switzerland
5 points	
4 points	Montenegro; Slovenia
3 points	Azerbaijan
2 points	
1 point	Germany; United Kingdom

==== Points awarded by Portugal ====
Points awarded by Portugal (Semi-final 2)
Score	Country
12 points	Sweden
10 points	Israel
8 points	Norway
7 points	Latvia
6 points	Cyprus
5 points	Montenegro
4 points	Slovenia
3 points	Azerbaijan
2 points	Poland
1 point	Czech Republic

Points awarded by Portugal (Final)
Score	Country
12 points	Italy
10 points	Russia
8 points	Sweden
7 points	Israel
6 points	Norway
5 points	Belgium
4 points	Romania
3 points	Spain
2 points	Latvia
1 point	Estonia

==== Detailed voting results ====
The following members comprised the Portuguese jury:

- Renato Júnior (jury chairperson) – music producer, composer
- Adelaide Ferreira – singer, songwriter, represented Portugal in the 1985 contest
- Gonçalo Tavares – musician, singer, songwriter
- Inês Santos – singer, actress, represented Portugal in the 1998 contest as member of Alma Lusa
- Nuno Feist – maestro, music teacher (jury member in semi-final 2)
- Nuno Marques da Silva – songwriter (jury member in the final)

Detailed voting results from Portugal (Semi-final 2)
R/O	Country	R. Júnior	A. Ferreira	G. Tavares	I. Santos	N. Feist	Jury Rank	Televote Rank	Combined Rank	Points
01	Lithuania	15	15	14	14	15	15	7	12	
02	Ireland	9	13	8	7	14	12	14	15	
03	San Marino	16	16	16	16	16	16	16	16	
04	Montenegro	10	6	5	6	8	5	9	6	5
05	Malta	6	5	13	5	7	6	13	11	
06	Norway	2	3	2	3	3	2	5	3	8
07	Portugal									
08	Czech Republic	12	2	12	10	6	9	10	10	1
09	Israel	4	7	3	1	2	3	1	2	10
10	Latvia	3	9	10	4	12	8	4	4	7
11	Azerbaijan	11	4	6	12	5	7	11	8	3
12	Iceland	5	12	7	11	11	10	15	14	
13	Sweden	1	1	1	2	1	1	2	1	12
14	Switzerland	14	14	15	13	10	14	8	13	
15	Cyprus	8	10	11	9	9	11	3	5	6
16	Slovenia	7	11	4	8	4	4	12	7	4
17	Poland	13	8	9	15	13	13	6	9	2

Detailed voting results from Portugal (Final)
R/O	Country	R. Júnior	A. Ferreira	G. Tavares	I. Santos	N. Marques da Silva	Jury Rank	Televote Rank	Combined Rank	Points
01	Slovenia	5	20	4	12	13	12	21	16	
02	France	20	19	23	19	16	19	13	15	
03	Israel	11	11	11	1	1	5	6	4	7
04	Estonia	7	8	20	13	6	13	8	10	1
05	United Kingdom	17	26	21	16	19	20	22	22	
06	Armenia	19	24	22	21	24	24	27	27	
07	Lithuania	26	27	24	25	25	26	16	21	
08	Serbia	23	21	27	24	18	25	15	18	
09	Norway	1	1	2	2	3	1	10	5	6
10	Sweden	2	2	1	3	4	2	5	3	8
11	Cyprus	10	7	6	15	8	8	14	12	
12	Australia	15	17	13	10	14	15	11	14	
13	Belgium	8	4	5	14	12	7	7	6	5
14	Austria	18	16	18	18	21	18	24	23	
15	Greece	24	22	19	22	23	23	17	19	
16	Montenegro	13	9	7	6	7	6	19	13	
17	Germany	16	13	15	20	20	17	26	24	
18	Poland	22	14	17	26	27	21	18	17	
19	Latvia	3	18	12	7	11	10	9	9	2
20	Romania	14	3	10	11	15	11	4	7	4
21	Spain	12	23	8	8	10	14	2	8	3
22	Hungary	27	25	25	27	26	27	20	26	
23	Georgia	9	6	16	9	9	9	12	11	
24	Azerbaijan	21	10	9	17	17	16	25	20	
25	Russia	4	15	3	4	5	3	3	2	10
26	Albania	25	12	26	23	22	22	23	25	
27	Italy	6	5	14	5	2	4	1	1	12
