= Leonor Andrade =

Portuguese singer and actress

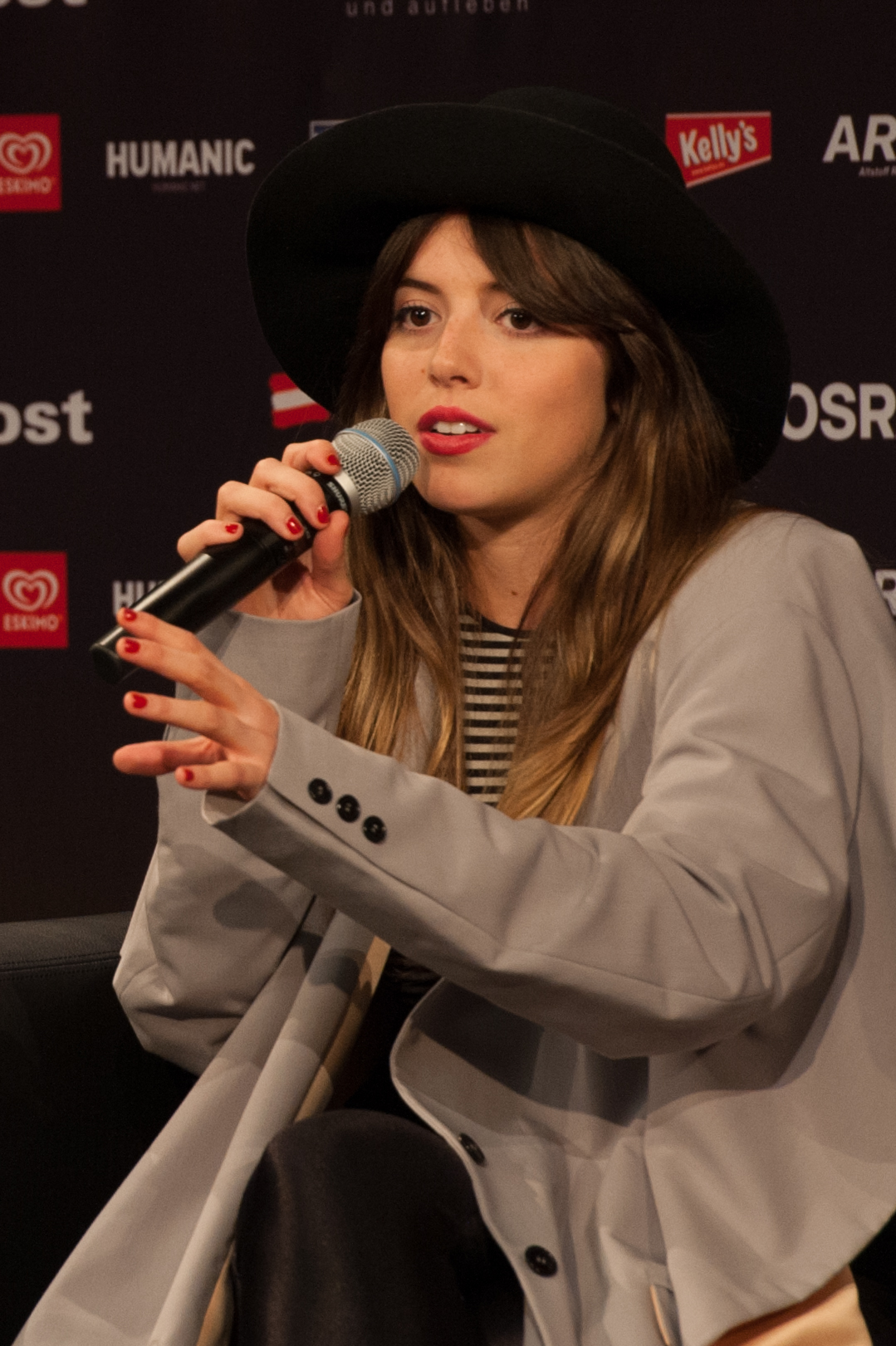
- Andrade in 2015

Background information
- Birth name: Leonor Margarida Coelho Andrade
- Also known as: Ella Nor
- Born: 13 September 1994 (age 30); Barreiro, Portugal
- Genres: Pop, pop rock
- Occupation(s): Singer, actress
- Instrument(s): Vocals, piano
- Years active: 2014–present

Leonor Margarida Coelho Andrade, also known as Ella Nor (born 13 September 1994) is a Portuguese singer and actress. She represented Portugal in the Eurovision Song Contest 2015 with the song "Há um mar que nos separa".

== Career ==
In 2014, Andrade participated in season two of The Voice Portugal. She was eliminated on episode 13. After The Voice, Andrade joined the cast of RTP1 telenovela Água de Mar, where she played Joana Luz.

On 19 February 2015, Andrade was announced as one of the twelve participants of Festival da Canção 2015 with the song "Há um mar que nos separa". On 7 March 2015, she won the competition and thus was selected to represent Portugal in the Eurovision Song Contest 2015. In 2016, she was granted a star on Nirvana Studios - Wall of Fame.

She announced on Instagram that she gave birth to a girl named Alice on 1 July 2023.

== Discography ==
=== Albums ===
Title	Details
Setembro	Released: 13 May 2016; Label: Viagens a Marte; Formats: Digital download, CD

=== Singles ===
Title	Year	Album
"Há um mar que nos separa"	2015	Non-album single
"Já Conheci"	2015	Setembro
"Strong for Too Long"	2015	Setembro
"Não Dá Mais"	2016	Setembro
"Não"	2017	Non-album single
"Shake It"	2017	Non-album single
"Bang"	2019	Non-album single

=== Music videos ===
Title	Year
"Já Conheci"	2015
"Back to Black" (Amy Winehouse cover)	2015
"Strong For Too Long"	2015
"Não"	2017

== See also ==
- Portugal in the Eurovision Song Contest 2015
- Leonor Andrade at IMDb

Awards and achievements
Preceded by Suzy with Quero ser tua	Portugal in the Eurovision Song Contest; 2015	Succeeded by Salvador Sobral with Amar pelos dois
