= Excuse Me (Ao Vivo) =

Live album by Salvador Sobral
- Released: 15 December 2017
- Recorded: 2016–2017
- Genre: Jazz
- Label: Edições Valentim de Carvalho

Salvador Sobral chronology
Excuse Me (2016)	Excuse Me (Ao Vivo) (2017)	Paris, Lisboa (2019)

Excuse Me (Ao Vivo) is a live album by Portuguese singer Salvador Sobral. It was released in Portugal on 15 December 2017 by Edições Valentim de Carvalho. The album peaked at number 4 on the Portuguese Albums Chart.

== Background ==
Sobral found some time while waiting for his heart transplant to put together a few live versions of his songs. On the album cover is a picture of Teatro Garcia de Resende in Évora, Portugal, the first stage he stepped on after winning Festival da Canção. The songs were recorded during his farewell concert in Cascais and his concerts in Centro Cultural de Belém, Casa da Música and Centro Cultural.

== Track listing ==
No.	Title	Length
1.	"Change" (Ao Vivo)	5:15
2.	"Nada Que Esperar" (Ao Vivo)	8:02
3.	"Excuse Me" (Ao Vivo)	9:23
4.	"Nem Eu" (Ao Vivo)	8:23
5.	"Something Real" (Ao Vivo)	10:31
6.	"Amar pelos dois" (Ao Vivo)	6:38
7.	"Ready For Love Again" (Ao Vivo)	9:12
8.	"Ay Amor" (Ao Vivo)	8:59
9.	"Até Já" (Encore - Ao Vivo)	9:20

== Charts ==
Chart (2017)	Peak position
Portuguese Albums (AFP)	2

== Release history ==
Region	Date	Format	Label
Portugal	15 December 2017	Digital download	Edições Valentim de Carvalho
