= Salvador Sobral =

Portuguese singer (born 1989)

Salvador Sobral ComM
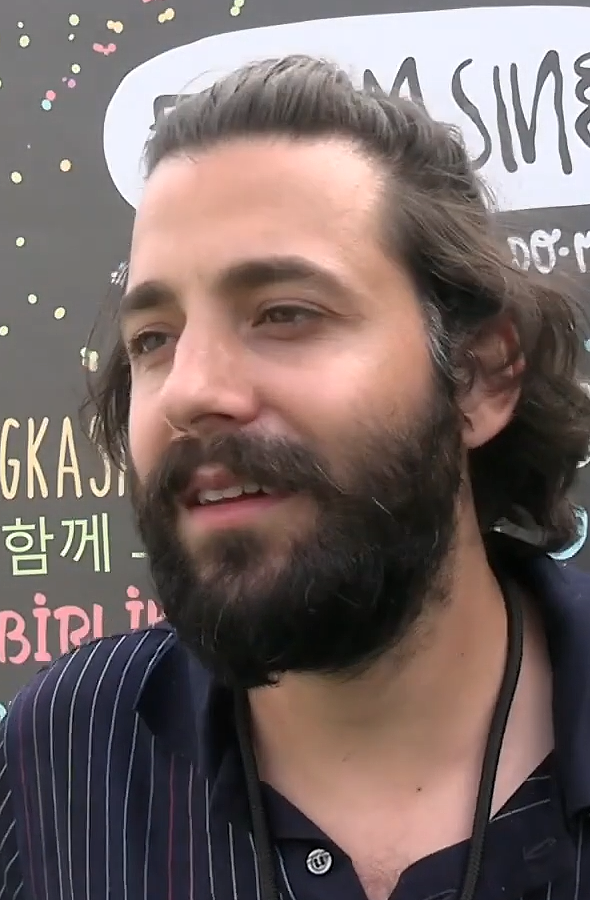
- Sobral in 2024

Background information
- Born: Salvador Vilar Braamcamp Sobral; 28 December 1989 (age 36); Lisbon, Portugal
- Genres: Alternative; soul; jazz
- Occupation: Singer
- Instruments: Vocals; piano
- Years active: 2009–present
- Label: Valentim de Carvalho
- Member of: Alexander Search
- Website: salvadorsobral.org

Salvador Vilar Braamcamp Sobral ComM (European Portuguese: [salvɐˈðoɾ viˈlaɾ βɾɐ̃ˈkɐ̃p suˈβɾal]; born 28 December 1989) is a Portuguese singer, who won the Eurovision Song Contest 2017 for Portugal with the song "Amar pelos dois", written and composed by his sister, Luísa Sobral. In doing so, he gave Portugal its first ever win in the contest since its debut in 1964, ending the longest winless run by a country in Eurovision history (53 years). Sobral and his entry hold the Eurovision record for the highest-scoring winner, having earned a total of 758 points under the current voting system, after winning both the jury vote and televote.

== Early life ==
Sobral was born in Lisbon and has lived there most of his life. He was born into a formerly noble family, the son of Salvador Luís Cabral Braamcamp Sobral and Luísa Maria Cabral Posser Vilar. His paternal grandparents are Salvador José de Almeida Braamcamp Sobral and Maria Elisa Perestrelo de Matos de Figueiredo Cabral.

At the age of ten, he participated in the TV programme Bravo Bravíssimo, and at 20 he was one of the ten finalists of Ídolos, the Portuguese version of the Idols franchise. As a finalist, he sang music by Stevie Wonder, Leonard Cohen and Rui Veloso.

He studied psychology at the ISPA - Instituto Universitário de Ciências Psicológicas, Sociais e da Vida, in Lisbon, which he abandoned to pursue a degree in music. He spent time in Mallorca at the University of the Balearic Islands as an Erasmus student, where he sang in bars.

== Career ==
=== 2009–2010: Ídolos ===
In 2009, he competed on season three of Ídolos, Portugal's version of the Idols franchise. He finished seventh in the competition. His sister, Luísa Sobral, is also a singer who previously placed third on season one of Ídolos.

Ídolos performances and results
Episode	Theme	Song	Result
Top 15	Idols' Choice	"Sunday Morning"	Top 5
Top 10	Big Bands	"Crazy Little Thing Called Love"	Safe
Top 9	Dedications	"I'm Your Man"	Safe
Top 8	Michael Jackson tribute	"Heal the World"	Safe
Top 7	Portuguese music	"Jura"	Eliminated

=== 2011–2014: Barcelona and first concerts ===
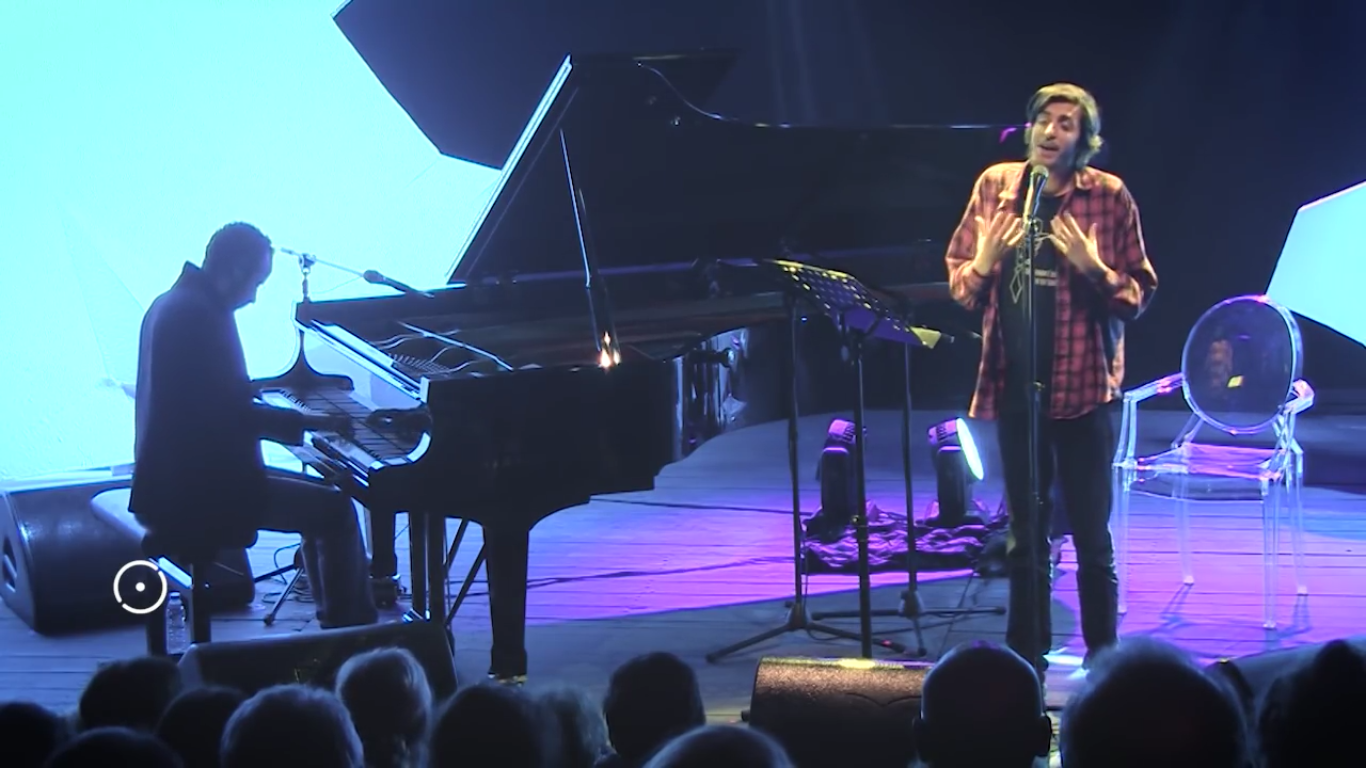
Salvador Sobral, accompanied by pianist Júlio Resende, in the FOLIO festival in Óbidos, singing poems by Alexander Search (one of Fernando Pessoa's pseudonyms).

After he left the Psychology program, he applied to the Taller de Músics, a music school in Barcelona, where he finished his studies in 2014. In 2015, he participated in the Vodafone Mexefest and EDP Cool Jazz festivals. During this time, Sobral traveled through several cities in Spain and among them, Tenerife, where he performed at a private party of a wealthy couple.

=== 2016–2018: Excuse Me, Eurovision Song Contest and health issues ===
On 2 August 2016, Sobral released his debut single "Excuse Me" as the lead single from his debut studio album. On the same day he released his debut studio album Excuse Me. The album peaked at number 10 on the Portuguese Album Chart. "Nem Eu" was released as the second single from the album on 27 October 2016. In 2017, Sobral was confirmed to be taking part in Festival da Canção 2017, with the song "Amar pelos dois". He went on to win the competition on 5 March 2017, and represented Portugal in the Eurovision Song Contest 2017.

Sobral could not perform in the first rehearsals because of a heart condition and an operation that forced him to rest ahead of the performance in the semi. His sister took over the role of singer during the first rehearsals. He won the final with 758 points, which under the current voting system represents the highest scoring winner in the history of the contest.

In July 2017, he participated in the Super Bock Super Rock festival in Lisbon, fronting rock group Alexander Search, a project he shares with pianist Júlio Resende and other musicians – the band plays music inspired by the work by Portuguese poet Fernando Pessoa.

In 23 April 2018 he and his sister, Luísa Sobral, received the Portuguese Order of Merit, both receiving the medals of Commanders (ComM). This honorific award was given by the Portuguese president himself, Marcelo Rebelo de Sousa.

In May 2018, Sobral performed "Mano a mano" and his Eurovision winning song "Amar pelos dois" in the final of the Eurovision Song Contest 2018, held in Lisbon, alongside Brazilian musician Caetano Veloso.

=== 2019–present: Paris, Lisboa and BPM ===
On 29 March 2019, his second studio album Paris, Lisboa (Paris, Lisbon) was released in 13 countries; he sings in 4 languages on it.

On 28 May 2021, Sobral released his third solo album BPM. The album was later nominated for Best Engineered Album at the 22nd Latin Grammy Awards.

== Personal life ==
Sobral is a fan of Chet Baker and Música popular brasileira singers including Caetano Veloso and Chico Buarque. He speaks six languages: Portuguese, Spanish, English, Catalan, French and some Italian. In 2019, he started to learn Swedish, as he is a fan of Swedish film-maker Ingmar Bergman.

Sobral married Belgian actress Jenna Thiam in a small ceremony in Lisbon on 29 December 2018. They have one daughter.

In March 2024, Sobral revealed he is intersex, since his body can't naturally produce the hormone testosterone.

=== Health ===
On 5 September 2017, Sobral announced that he would go on a temporary hiatus due to health concerns, following a last concert on 8 September, in the gardens of Casino Estoril, in Cascais. "It is not a secret that I have a fragile health; I have a problem. It is, unfortunately, time to hand over my body to science and to abandon my life of concerts and music; time to leave for a while from this civilian world and go to another where, certainly, my problem will be fixed. Unfortunately, I do not know how long this will take." On 8 December 2017, Sobral underwent a successful heart transplant. He left the hospital in January 2018, with doctors telling him to "take life quietly" and "keep away from crowds."

In October 2020, Sobral was diagnosed with COVID-19 after attending one of his sister's concerts but, by his own account, made an easy recovery having self-isolated for 20 days.

== Activism ==
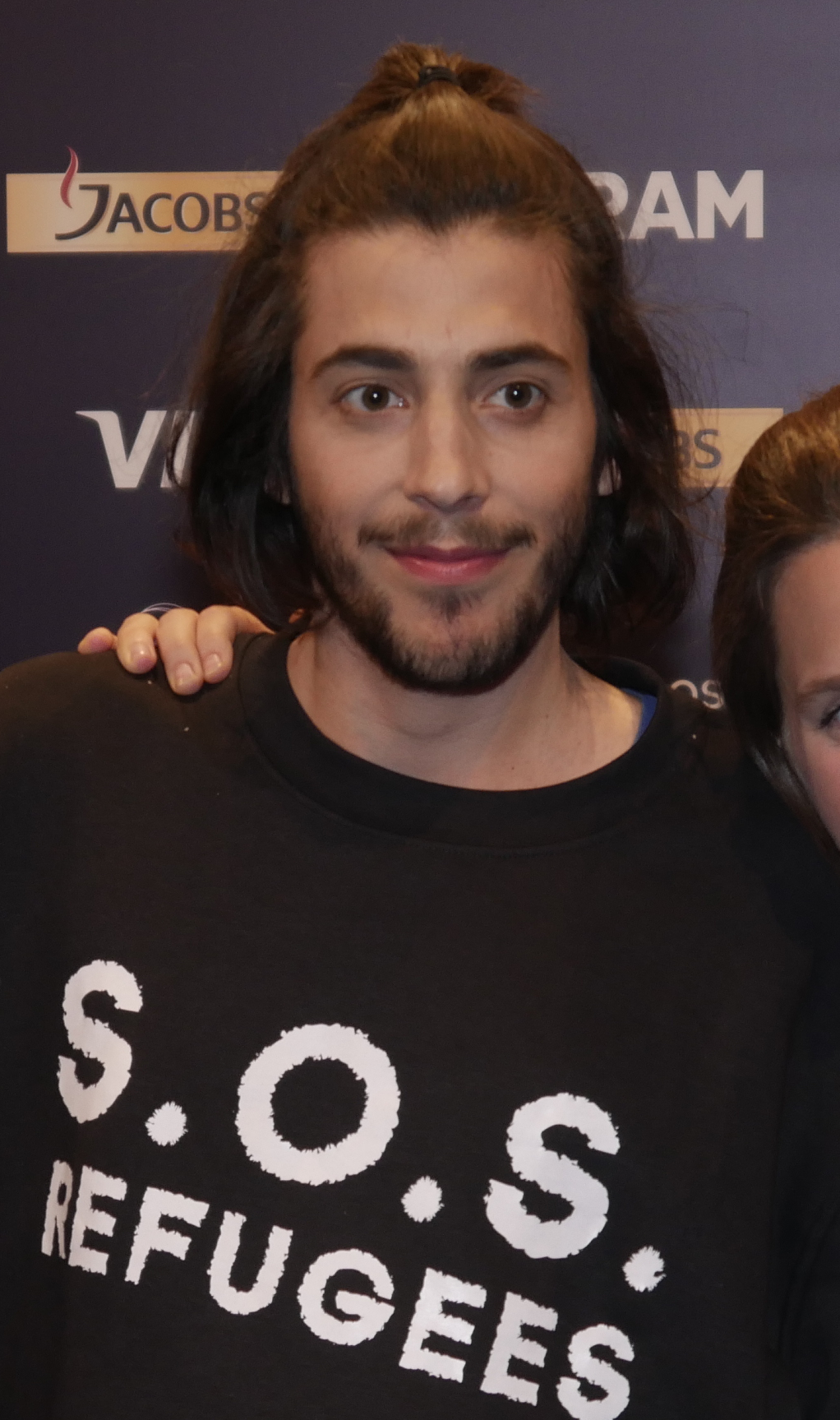
Sobral wearing the "S.O.S. Refugees" shirt.

Sobral drew attention to the European migrant crisis by attending the first semi-final winners' press conference in an 'S.O.S. Refugees' shirt. "If I'm here and I have European exposure, the least thing I can do is a humanitarian message," he said. "People come to Europe in plastic boats and are being asked to show their birth certificates in order to enter a country. These people are not immigrants, they're refugees running from death. Make no mistake. There is so much bureaucratic stuff happening in the refugee camps in Greece, Turkey and Italy and we should help create legal and safe pathways from these countries to their destiny countries," he added, earning a round of applause.

The EBU banned him from wearing the shirt for the remainder of the contest. The EBU argued that Sobral's shirt was being used as a "political message," violating the rules of the contest. Sobral argued at his winners' press conference, however, that it held a humanitarian message, not a political one.

During a concert in Ourém, Sobral announced on 19 June 2017 that he would donate all the profits from the sales of his CDs sold to the people of Pedrógão Grande and the relief efforts in the town after it was severely damaged by wildfires the previous day.

Due to the continuing Gaza war, more than 70 former Eurovision contestants, including Sobral, signed a letter calling for Israel to be excluded from the Eurovision Song Contest.

== Discography ==
Studio albums

- Excuse Me (2016)
- Paris, Lisboa (2019)
- BPM (2021)
- Timbre (2023)

Live albums

- Excuse Me (Ao Vivo) (2017)

EPs

- SAL (2022)

== Orders ==
- Commander of the Order of Merit (23 April 2018).

Awards and achievements
Preceded by Leonor Andrade with "Há um mar que nos separa"	Portugal in the Eurovision Song Contest; 2017	Succeeded by Cláudia Pascoal with "O jardim"
Preceded by (Ukraine) Jamala with "1944"	Winner of the Eurovision Song Contest; 2017	Succeeded by (Israel) Netta with "Toy"
