= Há um mar que nos separa =

2015 song recorded by Leonor Andrade

Single by Leonor Andrade
- Released: 20 March 2015
- Recorded: 2014–2015
- Genre: Pop-rock, electronic rock
- Length: 2:59
- Label: RTP; Universal Music
- Songwriter: Miguel Gameiro
- Producer: Fernando Martins

Leonor Andrade singles chronology
| "Há um mar que nos separa" (2015) | "Já Conheci" (2015) |

Eurovision Song Contest 2015 entry
- Country: Portugal
- Artist: Leonor Andrade
- Language: Portuguese
- Composer: Miguel Gameiro
- Lyricist: Miguel Gameiro

Finals performance
- Semi-final result: Failed to qualify (14th)
- Semi-final points: 19

Entry chronology
- ◄ "Quero ser tua" (2014)
- "Amar pelos dois" (2017) ►

"Há um mar que nos separa" (Portuguese pronunciation: [ˈa u᷉ ˈmaɾ kɨ nuʃ sɨˈpaɾɐ]; English: There's a sea that separates us) is a song recorded by Portuguese singer Leonor Andrade. It was written by Miguel Gameiro. The song won the Festival da Canção 2015, and represented Portugal at the Eurovision Song Contest 2015, in Vienna, Austria, but failed to qualify for the final.

== Release ==
"Há um mar que nos separa" was made available for streaming on 20 March 2015 in RTP's website. The song was later released on 7 April 2015 as a digital download through RTP and Universal Music. A promotional CD single will include the main Portuguese version, plus an English version, a Spanish version and two acoustic versions.

== Composition ==
"Há um mar que nos separa" is an electronic rock-influenced pop song which lasts for a duration of two minutes and fifty-nine seconds. Lyrically, the track features Andrade reminiscing about a past lover as she sings the line, "If it's the sea that separates us/ I will dry it with longing".

== Live performances ==
Andrade performed "Há um mar que nos separa" live for the first time during the first semi-final of Festival da Canção 2015 – the Portuguese national selection for the Eurovision Song Contest. Andrade performed the song as well in the grand final four days later where it won the competition. On 27 March, Andrade performed the song at the charity event Maratona da Saúde. On 19 April, Andrade performed an acoustic version at Got Talent Portugal alongside composer Miguel Gameiro.

== Track listing ==
- Digital download
1. "Há um mar que nos separa" – 2:59

== Release history ==
| Region | Date | Format | Label |
|---|---|---|---|
| Worldwide | 20 March 2015 | Streaming | RTP / Universal Music |
| Worldwide | 7 April 2015 | Digital download | RTP / Universal Music |
