= BPM (album) =

Studio album by Salvador Sobral
- Released: 28 May 2021
- Recorded: January 2021
- Studio: Le Manoir de Léon, Léon
- Genre: Jazz
- Length: 47:37
- Label: Warner Music Spain
- Producer: Leo Aldrey

Salvador Sobral studio album chronology
Paris, Lisboa (2019)	bpm (2021)

Singles from bpm
- 1. "Sangue do meu sangue" Released: 24 March 2021; 2. "Paint the town" Released: 26 May 2021

BPM (stylized in all lowercase) is the third studio album by Portuguese singer Salvador Sobral. The album was released on 28 May 2021 by Warner Music Spain. It was produced by Venezuelan musician and producer Leo Aldrey.

== Singles ==
"Sangue do meu sangue" was released as the lead single from the album on 24 March 2021. The second single was the English-language song "Paint The Town" and was released on 26 May 2021, two days before the release of the album.

== Reception ==
BPM was nominated for Best Engineered Album at the 22nd Annual Latin Grammy Awards.

== Track listing ==
All tracks are written by Salvador Sobral and Leo Aldrey, except where noted

No.	Title	Lyrics	Length
1.	"Mar de memórias"	Luísa Sobral	3:13
2.	"Fui ver meu amor - prelúdio" (feat. Abe Rábade)		0:52
3.	"Fui ver meu amor"		4:30
4.	"Se de mim precisarem"		3:34
5.	"That old waltz"		4:47
6.	"Medo de estimação"		3:54
7.	"Sangue do meu sangue"		3:50
8.	"Paint the town"		4:16
9.	"Páginas soltas"		3:17
10.	"Canción vieja"		2:30
11.	"Só eu sei"	Jenna Thiam	1:13
12.	"Aplauso dentro" (feat. Margarida Campelo)		3:14
13.	"Bom vento"		4:32
Total length:			47:37

== Personnel ==
Credits are adapted from the album's inner notes.

Musicians

- Salvador Sobral – vocals
- Abe Rábade – piano, Rhodes piano, Hammond organ
- André Santos – guitar, rajão
- André Rosinha – double bass
- Bruno Pedroso – drums
- Leo Aldrey – keys, soundscapes, upright piano on "Mar de memórias" and "Só eu sei"

Production

- Leo Aldrey – production, mixing
- Nelson Carvalho – recording
- Moritz Kerschbaumer – recording (Cacri Studio and Estúdio 15a)
- Rafael Giner – mixing
- Tiago de Sousa – mastering
- Caroline Deruas – photography
- Juan Daniel González – design

== Charts ==
Chart (2021)	Peak position
Portuguese Albums (AFP)	1
