= Júlio Resende =

Portuguese pianist and composer

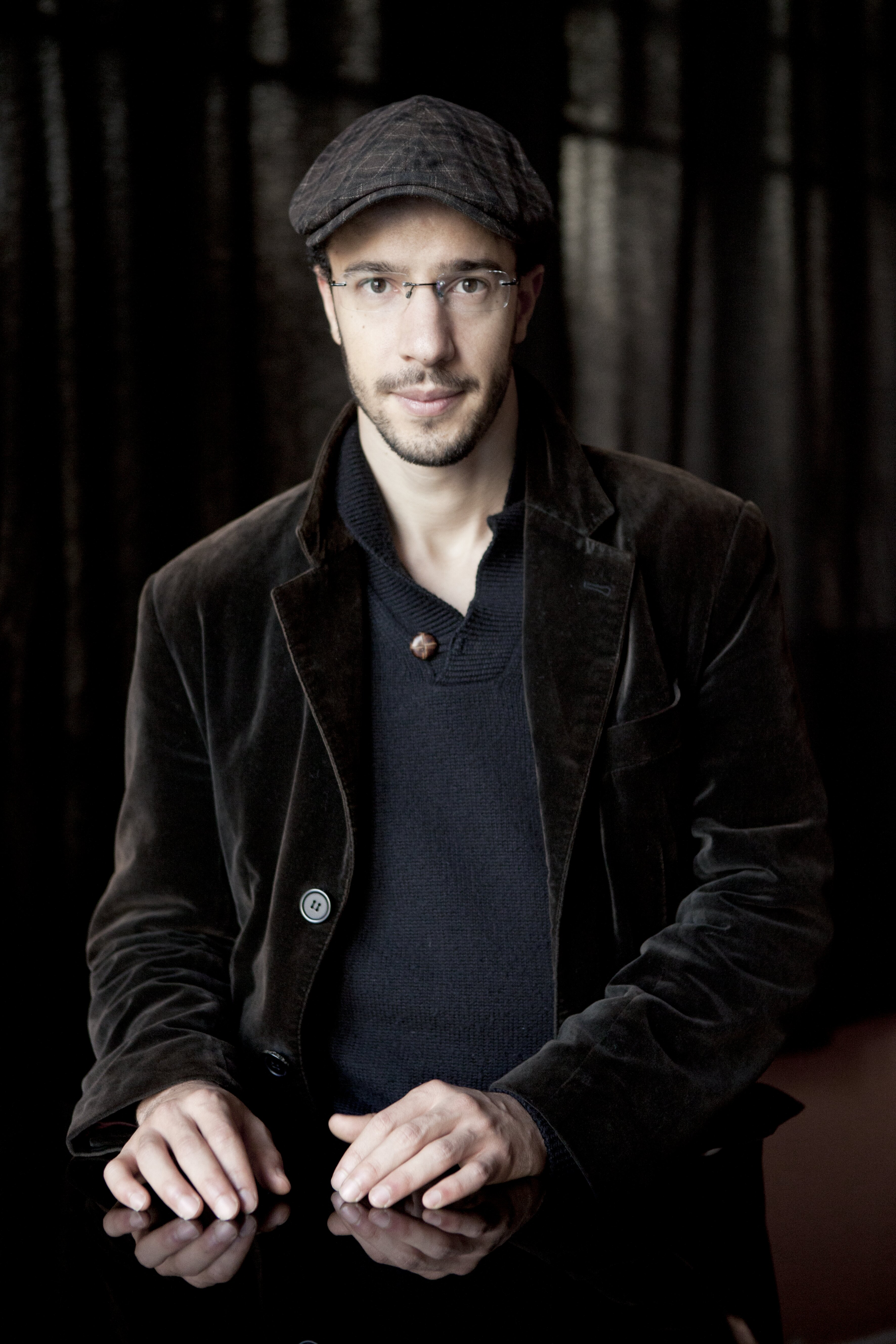

Background information
- Born: Júlio Resende; 10 June 1982 (age 44)
- Origin: Portugal
- Genres: Jazz, Fado
- Occupations: Pianist, Composer, Producer
- Instrument: Piano
- Labels: Sony, Warner, ACT Music
- Member of: Alexander Search
- Website: julioresende.com

Júlio Resende (Faro, 10 June 1982) is a Portuguese pianist and composer. He is a pioneer of a unique and new genre called "Fado-Jazz". His improvisation techniques are transversal to his aesthetics, and articulate different musical genres, from jazz, fado, classical music and electronic music.

His first venture into the Fado-Jazz genre was the album tribute to Amália Rodrigues, the "Diva" of Portuguese Fado. The album is called Amália por Júlio Resende and launched in 2013. Over the years, Resende has published more records where he develops and explores the possibilities of Fado-Jazz. In 2020, he released the album Júlio Resende - Fado Jazz Ensemble where he includes the Portuguese guitar to interact musically with a jazz trio. Since 2019, Júlio Resende has undertaken an artistic partnership with pianist Maria João Pires in a project that unites the worlds of classical music and improvisation, which the pianists have called: "Maria João Pires & Júlio Resende - Dialogues". He is also the leader of Alexander Search, a Rock band fronted by Eurovision Song Contest 2017 winner Salvador Sobral and inspired by Portuguese poet Fernando Pessoa. He is active as an improviser pianist. He has also played with artists like Maria João, Salvador Sobral, Cristina Branco, Cuca Roseta, Ana Moura, António Zambujo and Aldina Duarte.

Júlio Resende has also worked as a soundtrack composer for the Netflix film Elisa y Marcela, directed by Isabel Coixet and for the HBO series Foodie Love from the same director. Resende also has a degree in Philosophy, having studied at the Universidade Nova de Lisboa.

== Biography ==
Júlio Resende was born in Faro, Algarve region, Portugal, but spent his childhood in neighboring Olhão, Algarve region, Portugal. He started to play the piano at the age of 4. Resende considers the piano as "his favorite toy" in the childhood way of being. He studied at the Conservatório de Faro where, after studying classical piano, his taste for improvisation led him to jazz, as he needed "a musical language which demands freedom. Jazz is not a style, it's a way of thinking. I found in Improvisation and Jazz a musical language that thinks like this, in freedom, and demands this of its musicians."

In 2001, Resende moved to Lisbon where, while studying Philosophy at the Faculdade de Ciências Sociais e Humanas, Universidade Nova de Lisboa, he became involved in the musical activities of the Hot Clube de Portugal. He later left for Paris to study Jazz at the Université de St. Denis - Paris VIII. During this period he participated in workshops which led him to work with musicians from Hot Clube, the New School for Jazz and Contemporary Music, Berklee College of Music, and the Bill Evans Academy.

In 2018, on Eurovision Song Contest 2018 he played the piano on one of the grand final interval acts along with Salvador Sobral and Caetano Veloso.

== Debut in Jazz: 2008–2011 ==
In 2008, Resende released his first album, Da Alma. This album was his recording debut in jazz, and the artist came to be considered as "the youngest Portuguese musician to record a first album as a leader for the Clean Feed label, considered by AllAboutJazz one of the 5 best Jazz labels in the World."

In 2009, he edited the album Assim Falava Jazzatustra, a project featuring Manuela Azevedo, vocalist of the band Clã. The album was described by All Music Guide as "an excellent example of how European jazz musicians have taken inspiration from their North American counterparts and raised the bar to the point where they are now the ones making refreshing and original music, while the Americans stubbornly stick to tradition." This was followed by another album ahead of his trio, You Taste Like a Song (2011), and participation in OGRE, a jazz and electronic music fusion project led by singer Maria João.

Also in 2007 to 2017 he was a key figure in the Jazz and World Music Club in Lisbon, called Fábrica de Braço de Prata.

== Fado-Jazz: 2013 to the present day ==
After having recorded his first three albums, Resende released, in October 2013, Amália por Júlio Resende on the Valentim de Carvalho label, a work in which the pianist revisits with his instrument fados interpreted by the singer Amália Rodrigues. With this first incursion into the Fado genre, Júlio Resende brings to the scene his proposal of Fado-Jazz: the union of two musical imaginaries which results in a unique creation.

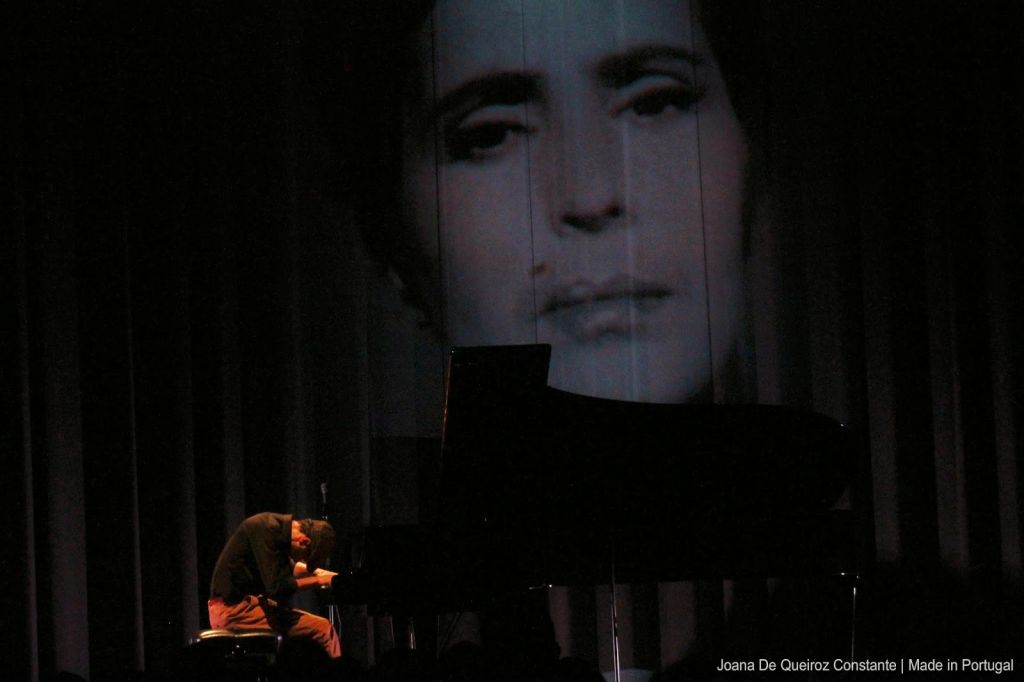
Júlio Resende playing the theme "Medo"

According to Resende, the challenge taken on by Amália por Júlio Resende project was "to bring Fado to the piano (...) All pianists have the dream of making a solo record. I wanted to make the most personal solo record possible. I understand the word 'solo' as something that has to do with earth, with roots, with the ground you walk on, that you inhabit. Among my earliest musical memories is the voice of Amália singing 'A Casa Portuguesa!' or the overwhelming 'Estranha Forma de Vida' and she serves as a symbol for this musical journey." The album includes the theme "Medo", a virtual and posthumous duet with Amália Rodrigues, using a recording of the singer's voice with unpublished permission from Valentim de Carvalho.

Between 2014 and 2016 he undertakes a series of international concerts to present his Amália work. With this album, Resende visited France, Spain, Mexico, the United States, Canada and Japan.

In 2015, Júlio Resende continued his exploration of Fado with the album Fado & Further, debuting the album with a show at the Calouste Gulbenkian Foundation in Lisbon, featuring the singers, Moreno Veloso, Sílvia Pérez Cruz and Gisela João. The album was portrayed by the Portuguese press as another example of "a natural integration of Portuguese popular music into his pianistic discourse".

Based on the English poetry of Fernando Pessoa, Resende formed a pop-rock band with influences of indie and electronic music to which he gives the name Alexander Search, one of Pessoa's most important heteronyms and who wrote almost exclusively in the English language. The album, released in June 2017, reached third of the national top sales. It featured the participation of Salvador Sobral, André Nascimento, Joel Silva and Daniel Neto, as well as the presence of Júlio Resende himself.

Cinderella Cyborg is an album released in 2018. It follows a musical adventure with an assumed flirtation between man and machine. It features piano, drums and double bass, and the electronic sounds of pads and chips.

Resende's latest album released in October 2020, Júlio Resende - Fado Jazz Ensemble with an aesthetic in the world of Fado and Jazz music, combines original themes played by a Portuguese guitar that blends with piano, double bass and drums. In the pianist's words: "It's an arrow with a suction cup at the tip, shot at the target called 'chest'. You hit it, you hope to find in that place a strong connection, that it doesn't fall; as if the suction cup becomes part of the skin. Something that lasts, that's what my music wants to be. About the album, it is a free album, in which the Portuguese guitar and the piano intercept each other, and with the double bass and the drums try to make the most of this new place that they discover together, strolling around. Whether it's Fado or Jazz, I don't know, maybe it's both, but I really don't know, because those who know don't usually move forward. He who already knows is stopped in that knowledge. I prefer not to know, just to go, free. Like the sound".

== Discography ==
- Da Alma (2007)
- Assim falava Jazzatustra (2009)
- You Taste Like a Song (2011)
- Amália por Júlio Resende (Solo) (2013)
- Fado & Further (Solo) (2015)
- Poesia Homónima Por Júlio Resende e Júlio Machado Vaz: Poemas de Eugénio de Andrade e Gonçalo M. Tavares (2016)
- Alexander Search (2017)
- Cinderella Cyborg (2018)
- Júlio Resende – Fado Jazz Ensemble (2020)
