= Alexander Search (band) =

Portuguese band

- Origin: Lisbon, Portugal
- Genres: Indie rock, indie pop, alternative rock, electronic
- Years active: 2016–present
- Labels: Sony Music
- Members: Júlio Resende "Augustus Search"; Salvador Sobral "Benjamin Cymbra"; André Nascimento "Sgt. William Byng"; Daniel Neto "Marvel K."; Joel Silva "Mr. Tagus"
- Website: alexandersearchband.com

Alexander Search is an English language Portuguese indie pop / indie rock band, formed in Lisbon, by pianist Júlio Resende and singer Salvador Sobral in late-2016.

"Alexander Search" was one of the many heteronyms used by 20th Century Portuguese author Fernando Pessoa. Search, a literary persona/pseudonym created by the author during his teenage years, wrote mainly in English (Pessoa would later switch to writing exclusively in his native Portuguese language).

The band pays tribute to the work of Fernando Pessoa by adopting his pseudonym's name and playing original indie pop/rock songs built around his poetry. Also in the same spirit, each of the band's members adopted pseudonyms.

Alexander Search's self-titled debut album was released in June 2017, peaking at number 3 in the Portuguese charts.

== Members ==
Salvador Sobral, "Benjamin Cymbra" – vocals (2016–2020)
Júlio Resende, "Augustus Search" – keyboards, piano (2016–present)
Daniel Neto, "Marvel K." – electric guitar (2016–present)
André Nascimento, "Sgt. William Byng" – electronics, keyboards (2016–present)
Joel Silva, "Mr. Tagus" – drums, percussion (2016–present)

== Discography ==
=== Studio albums ===
Title	Details	Peak chart positions
Title	Details	POR
Alexander Search	Released: 30 June 2017; Label: Sony Music; Formats: Digital download, streaming, CD	3
