= Mano a Mano (song) =

Song by Portuguese singer Salvador Sobral

Single by Salvador Sobral

from the album Paris, Lisboa
- Released: 11 May 2018
- Recorded: 2017
- Genre: Jazz
- Length: 3:59
- Label: Salvador Sobral
- Songwriters: Maria Do Rosário Pedreira; Rosinha

Salvador Sobral singles chronology
"Amar pelos dois" (2017)	"Mano a Mano" (2018)	"Cerca del Mar" (2018)

"Mano a Mano" is a song performed by Portuguese singer Salvador Sobral. The song was released in Portugal as a digital download on 11 May 2018 as the lead single from his second studio album Paris, Lisboa. The song peaked at number 84 on the Portuguese Singles Chart.

== Live performances ==
He performed the song live at the final of the Eurovision Song Contest 2018 on 12 May 2018 with Caetano Veloso.

== Music video ==
A music video to accompany the release of "Mano a Mano" was first released onto YouTube on 10 May 2018 at a total length of four minutes and two seconds.

== Track listing ==
Digital download
No.	Title	Length
1.	"Mano a Mano"	3:59

== Charts ==
Chart (2018)	Peak position
Portugal (AFP)	84

== Release history ==
Region	Date	Format	Label
Portugal	11 May 2018	Digital download	Salvador Sobral
