= Amar pelos dois =

2017 song by Salvador Sobral

Single by Salvador Sobral
- Language: Portuguese
- English title: "To Love for the Both of Us"
- Released: 10 March 2017
- Genre: Jazz waltz; bossa nova
- Length: 3:05
- Label: Sons em Trânsito; Sony
- Songwriter: Luísa Sobral
- Producer: Luísa Sobral

Salvador Sobral singles chronology
"Nem Eu" (2016)	"Amar pelos dois" (2017)	"Mano a Mano" (2018)

Music video
- "Amar pelos dois" on YouTube

Eurovision Song Contest 2017 entry
- Country: Portugal
- Artist: Salvador Sobral
- Language: Portuguese
- Composer: Luísa Sobral
- Lyricist: Luísa Sobral

Finals performance
- Semi-final result: 1st
- Semi-final points: 370
- Final result: 1st
- Final points: 758

Entry chronology
- ◄ "Há um mar que nos separa" (2015)
- "O jardim" (2018) ►

Official performance video
- "Amar pelos dois" (First Semi-Final) on YouTube "Amar pelos dois" (Grand Final) on YouTube "Amar pelos dois" (Winning Performance) on YouTube

"Amar pelos dois" (Portuguese pronunciation: [ɐˈmaɾ p(e)luʒ ˈðojʃ]; English: "To Love for the Both of Us") is a song recorded by Portuguese singer Salvador Sobral. The song was written and produced by his sister Luísa Sobral and released for digital download as a single on 10 March 2017 by Sons em Trânsito. It premiered earlier that year, on 19 February, when it was performed during the first semi-final of Festival da Canção 2017.

"Amar pelos dois" is a jazz waltz with the lyrical theme of heartbreak after a breakup. The track received praise from music critics. The song earned the Sobral siblings various awards, including two Marcel Bezençon Awards. The track achieved commercial success, particularly in Europe, reaching the top ten in several countries. It was certified platinum by the Associação Fonográfica Portuguesa (AFP). Sobral has performed "Amar pelos dois" at his international tours. It is included in the European Union Songbook as the all-time top Portuguese love song, and it is listed in the Guinness World Records. The song has been covered by several artists.

"Amar pelos dois" represented Portugal in the Eurovision Song Contest 2017 in Kyiv, Ukraine. The song gave Portugal its first ever win in the contest since their debut in 1964. It amassed 758 points, setting the record for the highest score in the history of the competition, and is the only entry to top both the televoting and jury voting in the second half of the 2010s. Salvador Sobral performed the song alone on stage B, close to the audience, while the background LED screens displayed an enchanted forest.

== Background and release ==
"I wanted to write a song that represents me, that could be on a record of mine, a song that I could be proud of and that's what I did".

— Luísa Sobral, composer of "Amar pelos dois"

"Amar pelos dois" was one of 16 songs commissioned by Rádio e Televisão de Portugal (RTP) for Festival da Canção 2017, Portugal's national selection for the Eurovision Song Contest 2017. The composers both created the song and selected the performer for their entry. Luísa Sobral composed "Amar pelos dois" specifically for her brother, Salvador: "I never thought about singing this song myself because when I wrote it I already had my brother's voice in mind. I was very fond of seeing him playing my song, because I think he is an extraordinary singer and because it gives me great joy to see him at the song contest and also that it turned out to be a family thing". Salvador Sobral stated that even though "Amar pelos dois" was created by Luísa, she gave him freedom to perform the song according to his artistic personality.

"Amar pelos dois" premiered on 19 February 2017, when it was performed for Festival da Canção 2017. The song was released for digital download and streaming as a single on 10 March 2017 via Sons em Trânsito. On 16 June 2017, it was released as a CD single by Sony Music.

== Composition ==
"Amar pelos dois" was written and produced by Luísa Sobral. The song is a jazz waltz with a length of three minutes and five seconds (3:05), that moves at a tempo of 92 beats per minute. It is composed in the key of F major and written in triple metre, with Salvador Sobral's vocals spanning from D_{4} to G_{5}. Without background vocals, the song has an instrumentation consisting of strings and piano. Sobral stated that "Amar pelos dois" is "influenced by those old songs from the Great American Songbook, and it also has a touch of the beautiful bossa nova melodies". The song's lyrical theme is heartbreak after a breakup: "Meu bem / Ouve as minhas preces / Peço que regresses / Que me voltes a querer". (Note: In English translation: "My love / Listen to my pleas / I beg you to come back / To want me again".) Sobral described it as "a love song. A sad one".

== Critical reception ==
"Amar pelos dois" was met with positive reviews from music critics. Fabien Randanne of 20 minutes described it as a "superb melancholic song" with a "delightfully anachronistic sound". Francisco Chacón of ABC noted that the song's jazz-pop tempo distinguished it from the "outlandish proposals in the otherwise kitsch music scene". The staff of Paris Match listed the song as one of their ten favourite entries of 2017, and noted a "great vocal mastery". Chris Zeiher of the Special Broadcasting Service noted the "simplicity" of the song, adding that "there's something refreshing and reflective" in it. Benny Royston of the Metro named the song "Portugal's best ever Eurovision entry", and commented that "sticking to Portuguese maintains the charm and charisma of this song that pulls at the heartstrings through musical composition". Christopher D. Shea of The New York Times described it as an "unexpectedly earnest ballad" that "has earned a loyal following for upending over-the-top Eurovision expectations", while Richard van de Crommert of De Telegraaf considered it Portugal's all-time best Eurovision entry. Jens Maier of Stern called the song a "surprise", adding that it "enchanted" the contest. Charlotte Runcie of The Daily Telegraph described it as an "artistic, beautifully crafted" and "sophisticated" song. Silvia Fumarola of la Repubblica wrote, "beautiful voice, romantic music. A ballad that breaks the mold: no choreography, no technological oddity".

== Awards ==
"Amar pelos dois" earned the Sobral siblings two Marcel Bezençon Awards: Salvador Sobral received the Artistic Award, whereas Luísa received the Composer Award.

At the ESC Radio Awards, "Amar pelos dois" won Best Song. It marked the first time since Sweden's "Euphoria" (2012) that a Eurovision Song Contest winning entry also topped the ESC Radio Awards poll. Additionally, the song earned Salvador Sobral the Best Male Artist award.

Year	Award	Category	Result	Ref.
2017	Marcel Bezençon Awards	Artistic Award	Won	
2017	Marcel Bezençon Awards	Composer Award	Won	
2017	ESC Radio Awards	Best Song	Won	
2017	ESC Radio Awards	Best Male Artist	Won	
2018	SPA Awards	Best Song in Popular Music	Won	
2018	Golden Globes (Portugal)	Best Song	Won	
2018	aRi[t]mar Awards	Best Portuguese Song	Won	

== Commercial performance ==
"Amar pelos dois" achieved commercial success, particularly in Europe. In Portugal, the song entered the singles chart at number 38 after winning Festival da Canção 2017 and remained on the chart for two weeks. Later, it re-entered the chart at number three. It climbed to number one the following week, after its victory in the Eurovision Song Contest 2017. The track debuted at number four on the Portuguese digital chart. The following week, it climbed to number three, and ultimately topped the chart. It received a platinum certification by the Associação Fonográfica Portuguesa (AFP) for selling over 10,000 units.

Elsewhere in Europe, "Amar pelos dois" appeared on several digital charts, peaking at number one in Finland, the Netherlands and Spain, while peaking inside the top ten in Belgium, Denmark, France, Greece, Luxembourg, Norway and Sweden. The song also appeared on various singles charts, reaching the top ten in Hungary and Switzerland, as well as the top 40 in other countries.

In the United States, "Amar pelos dois" peaked at number seven on the Billboard World Digital Songs chart, as one of the best-performing international digital singles.

== Live performances ==
Salvador and Luísa Sobral, the latter of which composed "Amar pelos dois", first appeared on radio stations RFM and Rádio Comercial on 8 and 14 March 2017, respectively. On 2 May of that year, Salvador Sobral's performance for Spain Calling International became available on RTVE's website. On 25 May 2017, the Sobral siblings performed on RTP1's talk show Agora Nós. Sobral performed alongside Brazilian singer Caetano Veloso at the Eurovision Song Contest 2018, on 12 May of that year. On 31 October 2018, Sobral performed the song at the aRi[t]mar Awards in Santiago de Compostela, Spain. Sobral has performed "Amar pelos dois" at his international tours.

== Eurovision Song Contest ==
=== Festival da Canção 2017 ===
On 5 December 2016, Luísa Sobral was announced as a participating songwriter of Festival da Canção 2017, Portugal's national selection for the Eurovision Song Contest 2017. On 18 January 2017, Salvador Sobral was announced to be performing her song, titled "Amar pelos dois". After being sent two songs by Luísa that she had written for the competition, Salvador selected "Amar pelos dois" as the song that he would like to perform. Luís Figueiredo, who did the string arrangement, also chose "Amar pelos dois" as the song to go through the competition's various phases. Salvador Sobral competed in the first semi-final on 19 February 2017, placing second with 20 points after winning the jury vote and coming third in the televote. In the final, held on 5 March of that year, he won the jury vote and came second in the televote, placing first overall with 22 points, becoming the Portuguese representative at the Eurovision Song Contest 2017.

=== In Kyiv ===
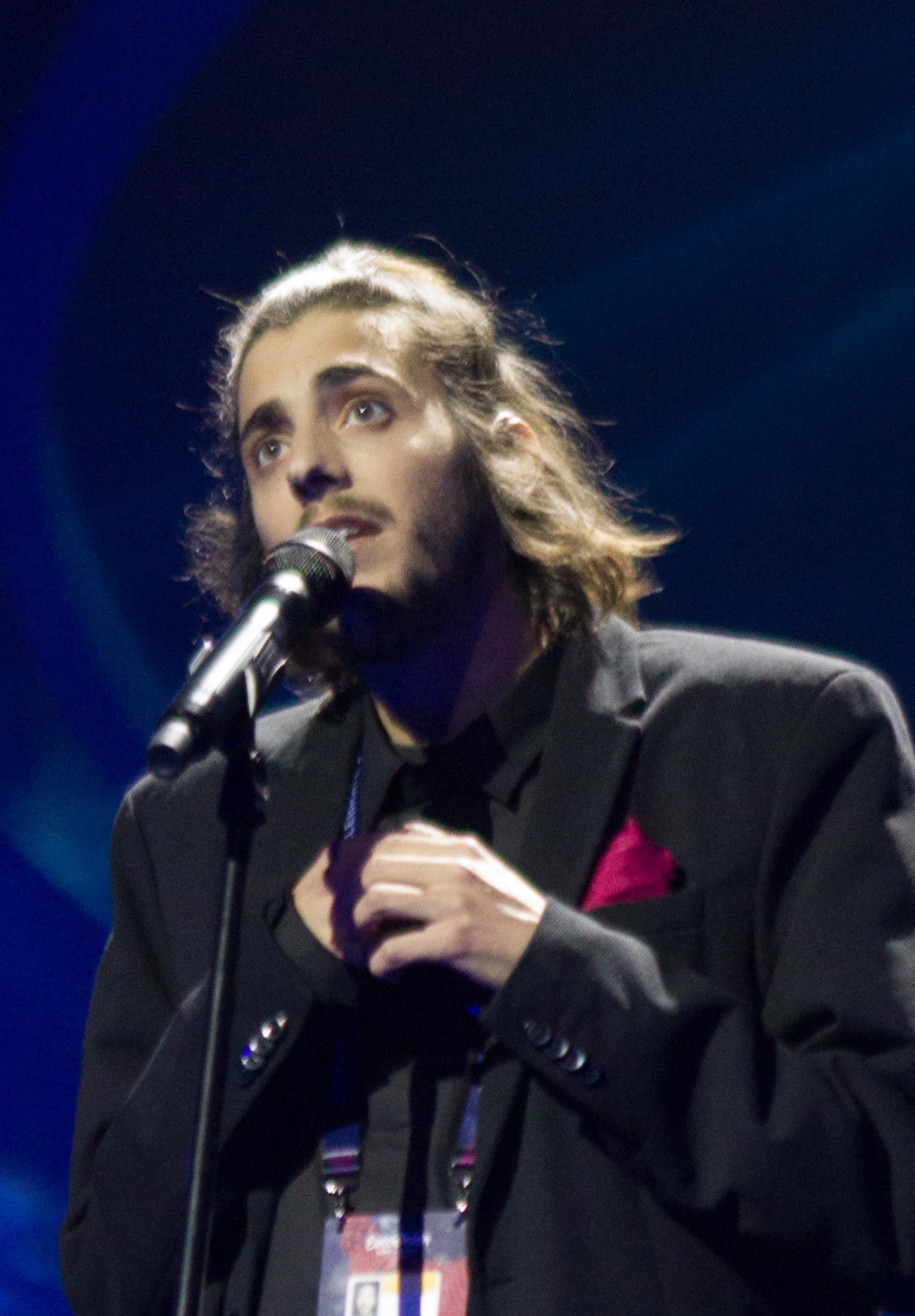
Sobral performing "Amar pelos dois" during a dress rehearsal for the contest.

The Eurovision Song Contest 2017 took place at the International Exhibition Centre in Kyiv, Ukraine, and consisted of two semi-finals on 9 and 11 May, followed by the final on 13 May 2017. Portugal was drawn to compete in the first half of the first semi-final, with the running order for the semi-finals being decided by the producers in order to avoid similar songs being placed next to each other. Portugal was set to perform in position nine, following the entry from Azerbaijan and preceding the entry from Greece. For the grand final, Portugal was drawn to compete in the first half. Portugal was subsequently placed to perform in position 11, following the entry from Denmark and before the entry from Azerbaijan. Sobral was one of the favorites to win the contest, according to bookmakers. With its tool, the "Eurosearch Song Contest", Google correctly predicted his victory. For the winner's encore, Salvador and Luísa Sobral sang the song as a duet, as they previously did in the national final.

For his performance, Salvador Sobral wore a black suit and performed alone on stage B, close to the audience. During the performance, the background LED screens displayed an enchanted forest. Sobral's victory was hailed in Portugal by the Assembly of the Republic, Prime Minister António Costa, Minister of Culture Luís Filipe Castro Mendes, and President Marcelo Rebelo de Sousa, who distinguished the Sobral siblings with the Order of Merit.

==== Record-breaking victory ====
By earning 758 points overall in the grand final, "Amar pelos dois" became the highest-scoring entry in the history of the Eurovision Song Contest, overtaking Ukraine's "1944", which had scored 534 points the year before. The former is the only entry to top both the televoting and jury voting in the second half of the 2010s. In the grand final, "Amar pelos dois" received at least five televote points from every participating country. It is the first winning song entirely performed in a country's native language since Serbia's "Molitva" (2007). With 382 points awarded by the national juries, "Amar pelos dois" broke the record of most jury points ever, surpassing Sweden's "Heroes", which had received 353 points from the juries in 2015. Additionally, the song achieved the biggest winning margin of the decade, outscoring the runner-up by 143 points. Under the 2013-2015 voting system, "Amar pelos dois" would have scored 417 points, would have become the only entry to score 400 or more points, and would surpass Norway's "Fairytale" which scored 387 points in 2009 with the 2009-2012 voting system. Also under the same voting system, the song would have received a record of 20 combined sets of 12 points, from televotes and jury votes, overcoming the 18 maximum scores collected by Sweden's "Euphoria" in 2012.

==== Points awarded to Portugal ====
Below is a breakdown of points awarded to Portugal in the first semi-final and the grand final of the contest, and the breakdown of the televoting and jury voting conducted during the two shows. The country finished in first place on both occasions. In the semi-final, Portugal was ranked first with 370 points overall, garnering 197 from the televote and 173 from the jury vote. In the end, the country won the contest with 758 points overall; 376 from the televote and 382 from the jury vote. In the grand final, Portugal earned a total of 30 sets of 12 points and 7 sets of maximum 24 points.

Points awarded to Portugal (Semi-final 1)
Televote
12 points	10 points	8 points	7 points	6 points
Albania; Belgium; Finland; Iceland; Latvia; Poland; Slovenia; Spain; Sweden	Australia; Greece; Italy; United Kingdom	Azerbaijan; Georgia	Armenia; Czech Republic; Montenegro	Cyprus; Moldova
5 points	4 points	3 points	2 points	1 point
Jury
12 points	10 points	8 points	7 points	6 points
Azerbaijan; Georgia; Iceland; Latvia; Moldova; Poland; Spain	Cyprus; Finland; United Kingdom	Slovenia	Armenia; Belgium; Czech Republic	Albania; Australia
5 points	4 points	3 points	2 points	1 point
Greece; Sweden	Italy; Montenegro			
50/50
12 points	10 points	8 points	7 points	6 points
Azerbaijan; Belgium; Finland; Iceland; Latvia; Moldova; Poland; Slovenia; Spain; Sweden; United Kingdom	Albania; Cyprus; Georgia	Australia; Greece; Italy	Armenia; Czech Republic	Montenegro
5 points	4 points	3 points	2 points	1 point

Points awarded to Portugal (Final)
Televote
12 points	10 points	8 points	7 points	6 points
Austria; Belgium; Finland; France; Germany; Iceland; Israel; Lithuania; Netherlands; Norway; Spain; Switzerland	Armenia; Croatia; Estonia; Ireland; Latvia; Poland; Sweden; Ukraine	Albania; Azerbaijan; Czech Republic; Georgia; Greece; Malta; Montenegro; Serbia; Slovenia; United Kingdom	Australia; Belarus; Bulgaria; Cyprus; Hungary; Macedonia; Romania; San Marino	Moldova
5 points	4 points	3 points	2 points	1 point
Denmark; Italy				
Jury
12 points	10 points	8 points	7 points	6 points
Armenia; Czech Republic; France; Georgia; Hungary; Iceland; Israel; Latvia; Lithuania; Netherlands; Poland; San Marino; Serbia; Slovenia; Spain; Sweden; Switzerland; United Kingdom	Belarus; Denmark; Germany; Macedonia; Malta; Norway; Ukraine	Austria; Azerbaijan; Belgium; Cyprus; Estonia; Finland	Australia; Croatia; Moldova	Albania; Romania
5 points	4 points	3 points	2 points	1 point
Greece; Ireland; Italy				
50/50
12 points	10 points	8 points	7 points	6 points
Armenia; Austria; Belgium; Czech Republic; Estonia; Finland; France; Germany; Iceland; Israel; Lithuania; Netherlands; Norway; San Marino; Slovenia; Spain; Sweden; Switzerland; Ukraine; United Kingdom	Australia; Azerbaijan; Belarus; Denmark; Georgia; Greece; Hungary; Latvia; Macedonia; Poland; Serbia	Albania; Croatia; Italy; Malta; Romania	Cyprus; Ireland; Moldova	Montenegro
5 points	4 points	3 points	2 points	1 point

== Legacy ==
=== European Union Songbook ===
"Amar pelos dois" is included in the European Union Songbook as the all-time top Portuguese love song. The song was the most voted by the public in a field of ten songs pre-selected by music industry professionals, thus representing Portugal in the category Love.

Organisation	Country	Category	Song	Result
European Union	Portugal	Love	"Amar pelos dois"	1st

=== Guinness World Records ===
"Amar pelos dois" is listed in the Guinness World Records for "Most points scored at Eurovision".

Year	Record holder	Record title	Ref.
2017	"Amar pelos dois"	Most points scored at Eurovision	

=== Use in media ===
"Amar pelos dois" is the opening theme song for the Brazilian telenovela Tempo de Amar on Rede Globo. It is featured on Salvador Sobral's live album Excuse Me (Ao Vivo). The track generated a two-part television documentary titled Sem Fazer Planos do Que Virá Depois and aired by Portuguese broadcaster RTP. As the central theme, it is played and sung throughout the documentary. The song is featured on the soundtrack album for the Netflix film Eurovision Song Contest: The Story of Fire Saga. In the film, Sobral is seen performing "Amar pelos dois" as a street performer. The track appears on the compilation album Now That's What I Call Eurovision Song Contest.

== Cover versions ==
Numerous artists have recorded cover versions of "Amar pelos dois". In 2017, Alexander Rybak, Eurovision Song Contest 2009 winner for Norway, recorded an English-language version. Fernando Tordo, Portugal's representative in the Eurovision Song Contest 1973 and 1977 (as a member of Os Amigos), recorded a cover of the song. Jitka Zelenková recorded a Czech-language version for her album Intimity. Arisa, winner of the Sanremo Music Festival 2014, recorded an Italian-language version for her 2019 album Una nuova Rosalba in città. Tiziana Tosca Donati, winner of the Sanremo Music Festival 1996, recorded an Italian-language version for her 2019 album Morabeza. Italian singer Senhit, San Marino's representative in the Eurovision Song Contest 2011, 2021, and 2026, recorded a cover of the song with Spanish operatic tenor Jordi Galán.

Several Eurovision Song Contest participants have performed "Amar pelos dois", including Nathan Trent (Austria 2017), Selma Björnsdóttir (Iceland 1999 and 2005), Lea Sirk (Slovenia 2018), Laura Groeseneken (Belgium 2018), Cezar (Romania 2013), Alfred García (Spain 2018), winner Marie Myriam (France 1977), Ari Ólafsson (Iceland 2018), Madame Monsieur (France 2018), Iriao (Georgia 2018), Michael Schulte (Germany 2018), Jelena Tomašević (Serbia 2008), Jurijus Veklenko (Lithuania 2019), Serafín Zubiri (Spain 1992 and 2000), Blas Cantó (Spain 2021), Barbara Pravi (France 2021), Yovanna (Switzerland 1965), Brunette (Armenia 2023), Ziferblat (Ukraine 2025). In a tribute at the Eurovision Song Contest 2018, several 2017 contestants sang a portion of the song: Svala (Iceland), Manel Navarro (Spain), Norma John (Finland), Alma (France), Kristian Kostov (Bulgaria), Martina Bárta (Czech Republic), and Blanche (Belgium).

In 2017, Dutch singer Jim van der Zee, winner of the eighth season of singing competition The Voice of Holland, covered the song in English language. In 2019, Spanish singer Pablo Alborán did a rendition of the song during his concert in Lisbon. In 2021, Portuguese singer Aurea performed the song on the Festival da Canção-themed TV special Hoje Há Festival.

== Track listings ==
- Digital download
1. "Amar pelos dois" – 3:05
- CD single
1. "Amar pelos dois" – 3:05
2. "Amar pelos dois" (Instrumental) – 2:56

== Credits and personnel ==
- Salvador Sobral – vocals
- Luísa Sobral – production, songwriting
- Luís Figueiredo – string arrangement, piano
- Quarteto Arabesco – strings

Credits adapted from the liner notes of "Amar pelos dois" promo single and from ESC Portugal.

== Charts ==
Weekly chart performance for "Amar pelos dois"
Chart (2017)	Peak position
Austria (Ö3 Austria Top 40)	22
Belgium (Ultratop 50 Flanders)	30
Belgium (Ultratip Bubbling Under Wallonia)	8
Belgium Digital Songs (Billboard)	6
Croatia (HRT)	19
Denmark Digital Songs (Billboard)	4
Europe (Euro Digital Songs)	13
Finland Download (Latauslista)	1
France (SNEP)	177
France Downloads (SNEP)	4
Germany (GfK)	43
Greece Digital Songs (Billboard)	5
Hungary (Single Top 40)	8
Iceland (RÚV)	1
Luxembourg Digital Songs (Billboard)	3
Netherlands (Single Top 100)	35
Netherlands Digital Songs (Billboard)	1
Norway Digital Songs (Billboard)	3
Portugal (AFP)	1
Portugal Digital Songs (Billboard)	1
Scottish Singles Sales (Official Charts)	37
Spain (Promusicae)	35
Spain Physical/Digital (PROMUSICAE)	1
Sweden (Sverigetopplistan)	33
Sweden Digital Songs (Billboard)	3
Switzerland (Schweizer Hitparade)	6
UK Singles (Official Charts)	97
US World Digital Songs (Billboard)	7

== Certifications ==
Region	Certification	Certified units/sales
Portugal (AFP)	Platinum	10,000^{‡}
^{‡} Sales+streaming figures based on certification alone.

== Release history ==
Region	Date	Format	Label	Ref.
Various	10 March 2017	Digital download; streaming	Sons em Trânsito	
Portugal	16 June 2017	CD single	Sony	

== Notes ==
Preceded by "1944" by Jamala	Eurovision Song Contest winners 2017	Succeeded by "Toy" by Netta
