= Pólo Norte =

Portuguese pop-rock band

- Origin: Belas, Sintra, Portugal
- Genres: Pop-rock
- Years active: 1992–2008
- Members: Miguel Gameiro; Tó Almeida; Marco Vieira; João Gomes; Luís Varatojo

Pólo Norte ("North Pole" in English) was a Portuguese pop-rock band, formed in Belas, Sintra in 1992. They were one of Portugal's most successful bands in the late 1990s and early 2000s.

== History ==
Pólo Norte was formed in 1992 by Miguel Gameiro (vocals), Tó Almeida (guitar), Marco Vieira (bass), João Gomes (keyboards), and Luís Varatojo (drums). They released their debut album Expedição in 1995. Starting in 2002 they took a three-year hiatus as Gameiro worked on a side project called Portugal a Cantar. The band reconvened in 2005; that year's album Deixa o Mundo Girar was especially popular and several of its songs were used in Portuguese telenovelas. The album was produced by British producer Steve Lyon.

The final Pólo Norte release was 15 Anos in 2008; the album was a compilation with two new songs. In 2010 Gameiro released the solo album A Porta ao Lado, which reached the top ten in Portugal. Gameiro later became a professional chef for a number of luxury haute cuisine restaurants on the Portuguese Riviera, including the Casino Estoril and Quinta da Beloura.

== Discography ==
- Expedição (1995)
- Aprender a Ser Feliz (1996)
- Longe (1999)
- Pólo Norte ao Vivo (2000)
- Jogo da Vida (2002)
- Deixa o Mundo Girar (2005)
- 15 Anos (2008)
