= Excuse Me (album) =

Studio album by Salvador Sobral
- Released: 2 August 2016
- Recorded: 2015
- Genre: Jazz
- Label: Valentim de Carvalho
- Producer: Júlio Resende

Salvador Sobral chronology
Excuse Me (2016)	Excuse Me (Ao Vivo) (2017)

Salvador Sobral studio album chronology
Excuse Me (2016)	Paris, Lisboa (2019)

Singles from Excuse Me
- 1. "Excuse Me" Released: 2 August 2016; 2. "Nem Eu" Released: 27 October 2016

Excuse Me is the debut studio album by Portuguese singer Salvador Sobral. It was released in Portugal on 2 August 2016, peaking at number 1 on the Portuguese Albums Chart in May 2017, following Sobral's victory at the Eurovision Song Contest 2017. The album includes the singles "Excuse Me" and "Nem Eu", the latter being a cover of a 1952 song of the same name by Brazilian samba singer-songwriter Dorival Caymmi.

== Singles ==
"Excuse Me" was released as the lead single from the album on 2 August 2016. The song peaked at number 22 on the Portuguese Singles Chart. "Nem Eu" was released as the second single from the album on 27 October 2016. The song peaked at number 25 on the Portuguese Singles Chart.

== Track listing ==
No.	Title	Length
1.	"Excuse Me"	4:23
2.	"Nada Que Esperar"	4:43
3.	"Change"	3:12
4.	"Nem Eu"	3:14
5.	"Autumn in New York"	3:23
6.	"Ready for Love Again"	3:39
7.	"Something Real"	3:40
8.	"Ay Amor"	5:49
9.	"Beach Prision"	3:51
10.	"I Might Just Stay Away"	6:02
11.	"After You’ve Gone"	1:57
12.	"Glow"	1:59

== Charts ==
Chart (2016–17)	Peak position
Austrian Albums (Ö3 Austria)	65
Belgian Albums (Ultratop Flanders)	23
Belgian Albums (Ultratop Wallonia)	92
Germany Jazz Albums (Official German Charts)	13
Dutch Albums (Album Top 100)	35
Portuguese Albums (AFP)	1
Spanish Albums (PROMUSICAE)	38
Swiss Albums (Schweizer Hitparade)	31
UK Download Albums (OCC)	65

== Release history ==
Region	Date	Format	Label
Portugal	2 August 2016	Digital download	Salvador Sobral
