= Nem Eu =

Single by Salvador Sobral

from the album Excuse Me
- Released: 27 October 2016
- Recorded: 2015
- Genre: Jazz
- Length: 3:14
- Label: Salvador Sobral

Salvador Sobral singles chronology
"Excuse Me" (2016)	"Nem Eu" (2016)	"Amar pelos dois" (2017)

"Nem Eu" is a song performed by Portuguese singer Salvador Sobral. The song was released in Portugal as a digital download on 27 October 2016 as the second single from his debut studio album Excuse Me (2016). The song peaked at number 25 on the Portuguese Singles Chart.

It is a contemporary cover of the song written and sung by the Brazilian top artist Dorival Caymmi in 1952.

== Music video ==
A music video to accompany the release of "Nem Eu" was first released onto YouTube on 1 November 2016 at a total length of three minutes and twelve seconds.

== Track listing ==
Digital download
No.	Title	Length
1.	"Nem Eu"	3:14

== Charts ==
Chart (2017)	Peak position
Portugal (AFP)	25

== Release history ==
Region	Date	Format	Label
Portugal	27 October 2016	Digital download	Salvador Sobral
