= Luísa Sobral =

Portuguese singer and songwriter (born 1987)

Luísa Sobral ComM
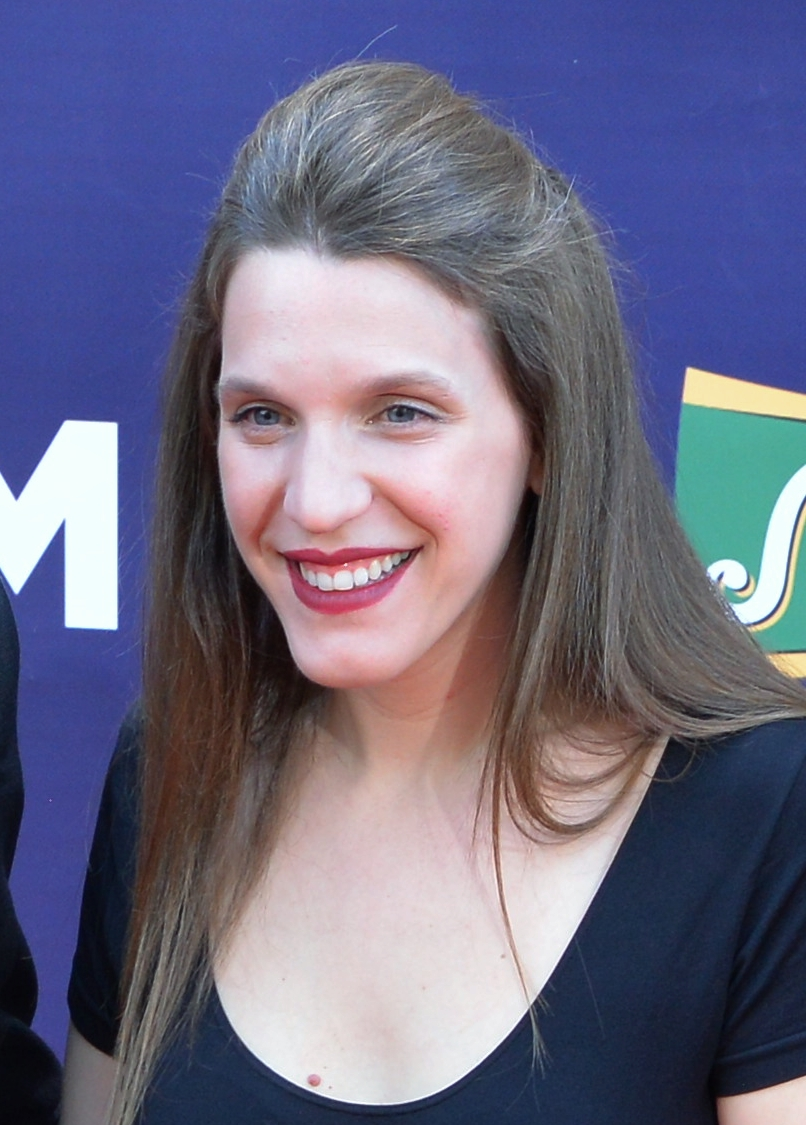
- Luísa Sobral at the Eurovision Song Contest 2017 in Kyiv

Background information
- Born: Luísa Vilar Braamcamp Sobral; 18 September 1987 (age 39); Lisbon, Portugal
- Genre: Pop
- Website: luisasobral.com

Luísa Vilar Braamcamp Sobral ComM (European Portuguese: [luˈizɐ viˈlaɾ βɾɐ̃ˈkɐ̃p suˈβɾal]; born 18 September 1987) is a Portuguese singer and songwriter. She came to prominence in 2003 after finishing third in the first season of Ídolos, the Portuguese version of Idols television series. After going on hiatus to attend the Berklee College of Music, she released her debut album, The Cherry on My Cake, in 2011. She later composed "Amar pelos dois", which was performed by her brother Salvador Sobral and won the Eurovision Song Contest 2017 for Portugal.

== Life and career ==
=== Early life and career ===
Luísa Sobral was born and raised in Lisbon, and also lived in the United States for a period of time as a child. Her younger brother is Salvador Sobral, who is also a singer. Through her father, she is related to Hermano José Braamcamp de Almeida Castelo Branco, a 19th-century Portuguese nobleman and politician of Italian and Dutch descent.

In 2003, at the age of 16, Sobral auditioned for season one of Ídolos, the Portuguese version of Idols. She eventually came third in the competition. After Ídolos, Sobral took a break from her musical career in order to focus on her education. She moved to the United States to study music at the Berklee College of Music in Boston, graduating in 2009. Her move to the United States made her compositions more distinct, a mixture between Portuguese, Brazilian, French and North American musical traditions, reflecting her musical influences in her classic soft-spoken singing style.

=== 2011–present: Professional career ===
Luísa Sobral returned to the music industry in 2011, releasing her debut studio album, The Cherry on My Cake. The album peaked at No.3 on the Portuguese albums chart. In 2012, she performed with Jools Holland and Melody Gardot. She went on tour with Gardot.

Her second studio album, There's a Flower in My Bedroom, was released in 2013, and her third, Lu-Pu-I-Pi-Sa-Pa, the following year. In 2016, Sobral released her fourth studio album, Luísa, recorded in Los Angeles at United Recording Studios with Joe Henry and Greg Leisz. During the same year, she wrote "Amar pelos dois" for Portuguese national broadcaster RTP1's Festival da Canção 2017. At the invitation of the broadcaster, wanting to change the public perspective in which Portugal had never gotten past sixth place, Luísa and Salvador Sobral represented musicians who were unknown outside of Portugal.

Salvador Sobral, her younger brother, sang "Amar pelos dois", a bossa-nova-inspired jazz ballad that was written by Luísa Sobral. It would end up winning Festival da Canção, and was thus chosen to represent Portugal in the Eurovision Song Contest 2017. Because Portugal is not included in the Big 5 countries (France, Germany, Italy, Spain, United Kingdom) that are able to reach the final without participating in the semi-finals, the song had to go through the semi-final stage before reaching the final. Luísa and Salvador Sobral learned that the song had risen to the top of betting agencies' polls, beating such as Francesco Gabbani's "Occidentali's Karma".

During rehearsals for the contest in Kyiv, Sobral had to stand in for Salvador as a performer due to his health issues. During the final on 13 May 2017, the song was declared the winner, becoming the first victory for Portugal and the record-holder for the most points received by a song in the final. Sobral performed the song with Salvador during his winner's encore performance, as she did after he won Festival da Canção 2017. The song and the winning performance in Kyiv made Luísa and Salvador Sobral household names overnight in Portugal. They were received like heroes by hundreds of fans upon their arrival at Lisbon Airport.

In April 2018, Sobral and her brother were given the Portuguese Order of Merit, both receiving medals of Commanders (ComM). This award was given by Portuguese president Marcelo Rebelo de Sousa.

== Personal life ==
Sobral is married and has four children: José (born 29 June 2016), Rosa (born 13 May 2018), Camila (born June/July 2020) and Salvador (born June 2022).

== Awards ==
- Commander of the Order of Merit

== Discography ==
=== Studio albums ===
| Title | Details | Peak chart positions |
| Title | Details | POR |
|---|---|---|
| The Cherry on My Cake | Released: 2011; Label: Universal Music Portugal; Formats: Digital download, CD | 3 |
| There's a Flower in My Bedroom | Released: 2013; Label: Universal Music Portugal; Formats: Digital download, CD | 2 |
| Lu-Pu-I-Pi-Sa-Pa | Released: 2014; Label: Universal Music Portugal; Formats: Digital download, CD | 10 |
| Luísa | Released: 18 November 2016; Label: Universal Music Portugal; Formats: Digital download, CD | 4 |
| Rosa | Released: 9 November 2018; Label: Universal Music Portugal; Formats: Digital download, CD | 4 |
| DanSando | Released: 22 May 2023; Formats: Digital download, CD | |

=== Singles ===
| Title | Year | Album |
|---|---|---|
| "Not There Yet" | 2011 | The Cherry on My Cake |
| "Xico" | 2011 | The Cherry on My Cake |
| "Mom Says" | 2013 | There's a Flower in My Bedroom |
| "My Man" | 2016 | Luísa |
| "Alone" | 2016 | Luísa |
