= Excuse Me (Salvador Sobral song) =

Single by Salvador Sobral

from the album Excuse Me
- Released: 2 August 2016
- Recorded: 2015
- Genre: Jazz
- Length: 4:23
- Label: Salvador Sobral
- Songwriter(s): Salvador Sobral; Leonardo Aldrey

Salvador Sobral singles chronology
| "Excuse Me" (2016) | "Nem Eu" (2016) |

"Excuse Me" is a song performed by Portuguese singer Salvador Sobral. The song was released in Portugal as a digital download on 2 August 2016 as the lead single from his debut studio album Excuse Me (2016). The song peaked at number 22 on the Portuguese Singles Chart.

== Music video ==
A music video to accompany the release of "Excuse Me" was first released on YouTube on 10 March 2016 at a length of four minutes and twenty-one seconds.

== Track listing ==
Digital download
| No. | Title | Length |
|---|---|---|
| 1. | "Excuse Me" | 4:23 |

== Charts ==
| Chart (2017) | Peak position |
|---|---|
| Portugal (AFP) | 22 |

== Release history ==
| Region | Date | Format | Label |
|---|---|---|---|
| Portugal | 2 August 2016 | Digital download | Salvador Sobral |
