= Belgium in the Eurovision Song Contest 2017 =

- Eurovision Song Contest 2017
- Participating broadcaster: Radio-télévision belge de la Communauté française (RTBF)
- Country: Belgium
- Selection process: Internal selection
- Announcement date: Artist: 22 November 2016; Song: 8 March 2017

Competing entry
- Song: "City Lights"
- Artist: Blanche
- Songwriters: Pierre Dumoulin; Emmanuel Delcourt; Ellie Delvaux

Placement
- Semi-final result: Qualified (4th, 165 points)
- Final result: 4th, 363 points

Participation chronology

Belgium was represented at the Eurovision Song Contest 2017 with the song "City Lights", written by Pierre Dumoulin, Emmanuel Delcourt, and Ellie Delvaux, and performed by Delvaux herself under her stage name Blanche. The Belgian participating broadcaster, Walloon Radio-télévision belge de la Communauté française (RTBF), internally selected its entry for the contest. The artist was announced on 22 November 2016, and the song was presented to the public on 8 March 2017.

Belgium was drawn to compete in the first semi-final of the Eurovision Song Contest which took place on 9 May 2017. Performing during the show in position 5, "City Lights" was announced among the top 10 entries of the first semi-final and therefore qualified to compete in the final on 23 May. It was later revealed that Belgium placed fourth out of the 18 participating countries in the semi-final with 165 points. In the final, Belgium performed in position 23 and placed fourth out of the 26 participating countries, scoring 363 points.

== Background ==
Prior to the 2017 contest, Belgium had participated in the Eurovision Song Contest fifty-eight times since its debut as one of seven countries to take part in 1956. Since then, the country has won the contest on one occasion in 1986 with the song "J'aime la vie" performed by Sandra Kim. Following the introduction of semi-finals for the 2004 contest, Belgium had been featured in only five finals. In 2016, "What's the Pressure" by Laura Tesoro qualified to the final and placed tenth.

The Belgian participation in the contest alternates between two broadcasters: Flemish Vlaamse Radio- en Televisieomroeporganisatie (VRT) and Walloon Radio-télévision belge de la Communauté française (RTBF) at the time, with both broadcasters sharing the broadcasting rights. Both broadcasters –and their predecessors– have selected the Belgian entry using national finals and internal selections in the past. In 2015, RTBF internally selected a contestant from the reality singing competition The Voice Belgique to represent the nation, while in 2016, VRT organised the national final Eurosong in order to select the entry. On 23 May 2016, RTBF confirmed its participation in the 2017 contest and internally selected both the artist and song.

== Before Eurovision ==
=== Internal selection ===
The Belgian entry for the 2017 Eurovision Song Contest was selected via an internal selection by RTBF. On 22 November 2016, the broadcaster announced that they had selected Ellie Delvaux (Blanche) to represent Belgium in Kyiv. Blanche was a participant in the fifth series of the reality singing competition The Voice Belgique. It was also announced that Blanche had worked with lead singer of the group Roscoe, Pierre Dumoulin, on the song she would perform at the contest, which was selected by a twelve-member committee from 20 proposals submitted by record companies. Among artists that were previously rumoured to be selected for the competition included other participants in the fifth series of The Voice Belgique Olivier Kaye and Pierre Lizée.

The song, "City Lights", was set to be presented to the public on 8 March 2017 during a press conference held in Brussels, however a snippet was leaked the night before through Spotify. The song was written by Blanche herself along with Pierre Dumoulin and Emmanuel Delcourt, and was first written in imaginary language before being selected for the Eurovision Song Contest with the title being the only English words that were sung. The music video for the song, filmed in Brussels and directed by Brice VDH and Simon Vanrie, was released on the same day of the presentation. Following the snippet leak, Belgium rose 23 places in the betting odds and was considered by bookmakers to be the second most likely country to win the contest.

=== Promotion ===
Blanche made several appearances across Europe to specifically promote "City Lights" as the Belgian Eurovision entry. On 2 April, Blanche performed during the London Eurovision Party, which was held at the Café de Paris venue in London and hosted by Nicki French and Paddy O'Connell. Between 3 and 6 April, Blanche took part in promotional activities in Tel Aviv, Israel where she performed during the Israel Calling event held at the Ha'teatron venue. On 8 April, Blanche performed during the Eurovision in Concert event which was held at the Melkweg venue in Amsterdam, Netherlands and hosted by Cornald Maas and Selma Björnsdóttir. On 15 April, Blanche performed during the Eurovision Spain Pre-Party, which was held at the Sala La Riviera venue in Madrid, Spain.

== At Eurovision ==
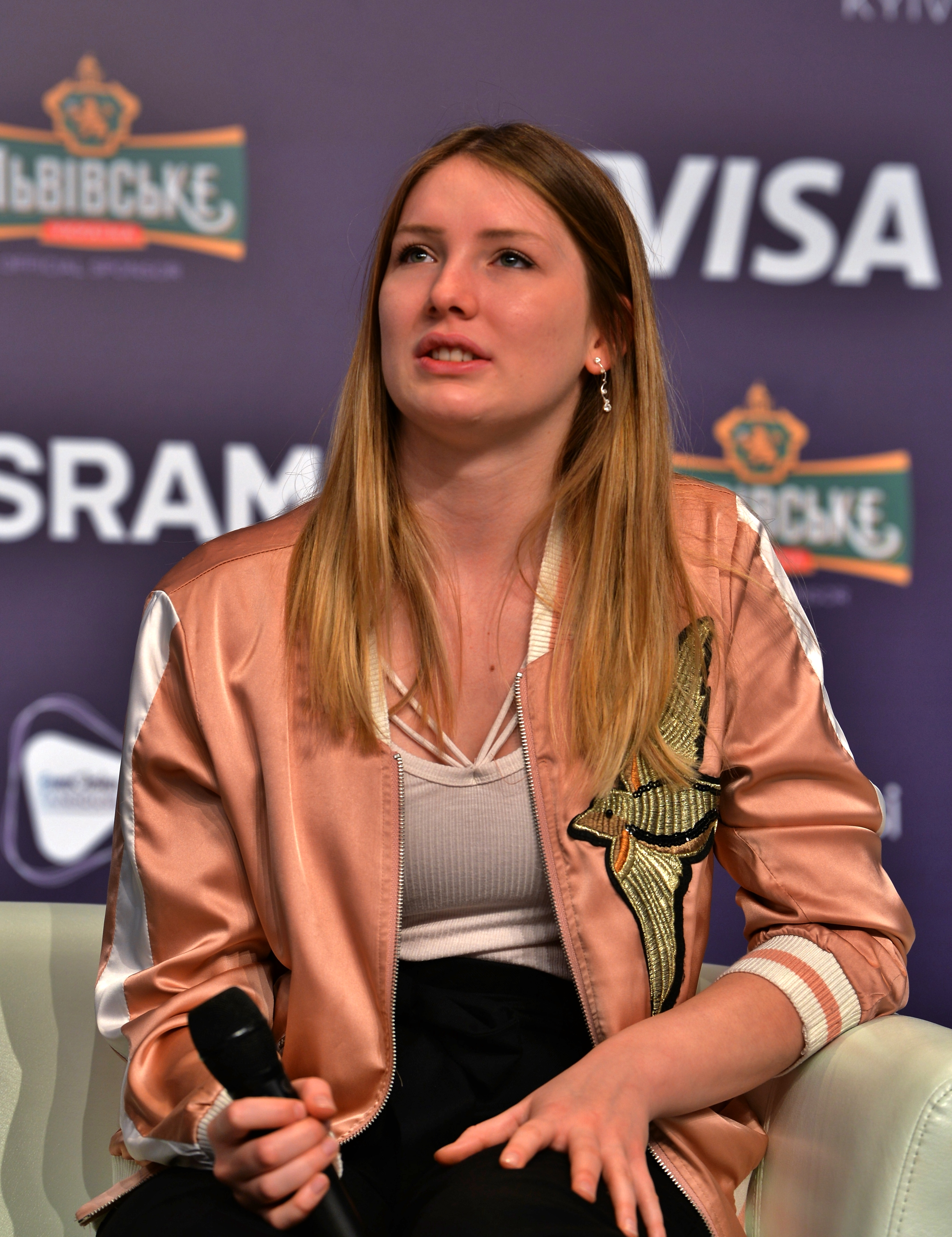
Blanche during a press meet and greet

According to Eurovision rules, all nations with the exceptions of the host country and the "Big Five" (France, Germany, Italy, Spain and the United Kingdom) are required to qualify from one of two semi-finals in order to compete for the final; the top ten countries from each semi-final progress to the final. The European Broadcasting Union (EBU) split up the competing countries into six different pots based on voting patterns from previous contests, with countries with favourable voting histories put into the same pot. On 31 January 2017, a special allocation draw was held which placed each country into one of the two semi-finals, as well as which half of the show they would perform in. Belgium was placed into the first semi-final, to be held on 9 May 2017, and was scheduled to perform in the first half of the show.

Once all the competing songs for the 2017 contest had been released, the running order for the semi-finals was decided by the shows' producers rather than through another draw, so that similar songs were not placed next to each other. Belgium was set to perform in position 5, following the entry from Albania and before the entry from Montenegro.

The two semi-finals and the final was broadcast in Belgium by both the Flemish and Walloon broadcasters. VRT broadcast the shows on één and Radio 2 with commentary in Dutch by Peter Van de Veire. RTBF televised the shows on La Une with commentary in French by Jean-Louis Lahaye and Maureen Louys; the first semi-final aired on a 90-minute delay on La Une. The final was also broadcast by RTBF on VivaCité with commentary in French by Olivier Gilain. The Belgian spokesperson, who announced the top 12-point score awarded by the Belgian jury during the final, was Fanny Gillard.

=== Semi-final ===
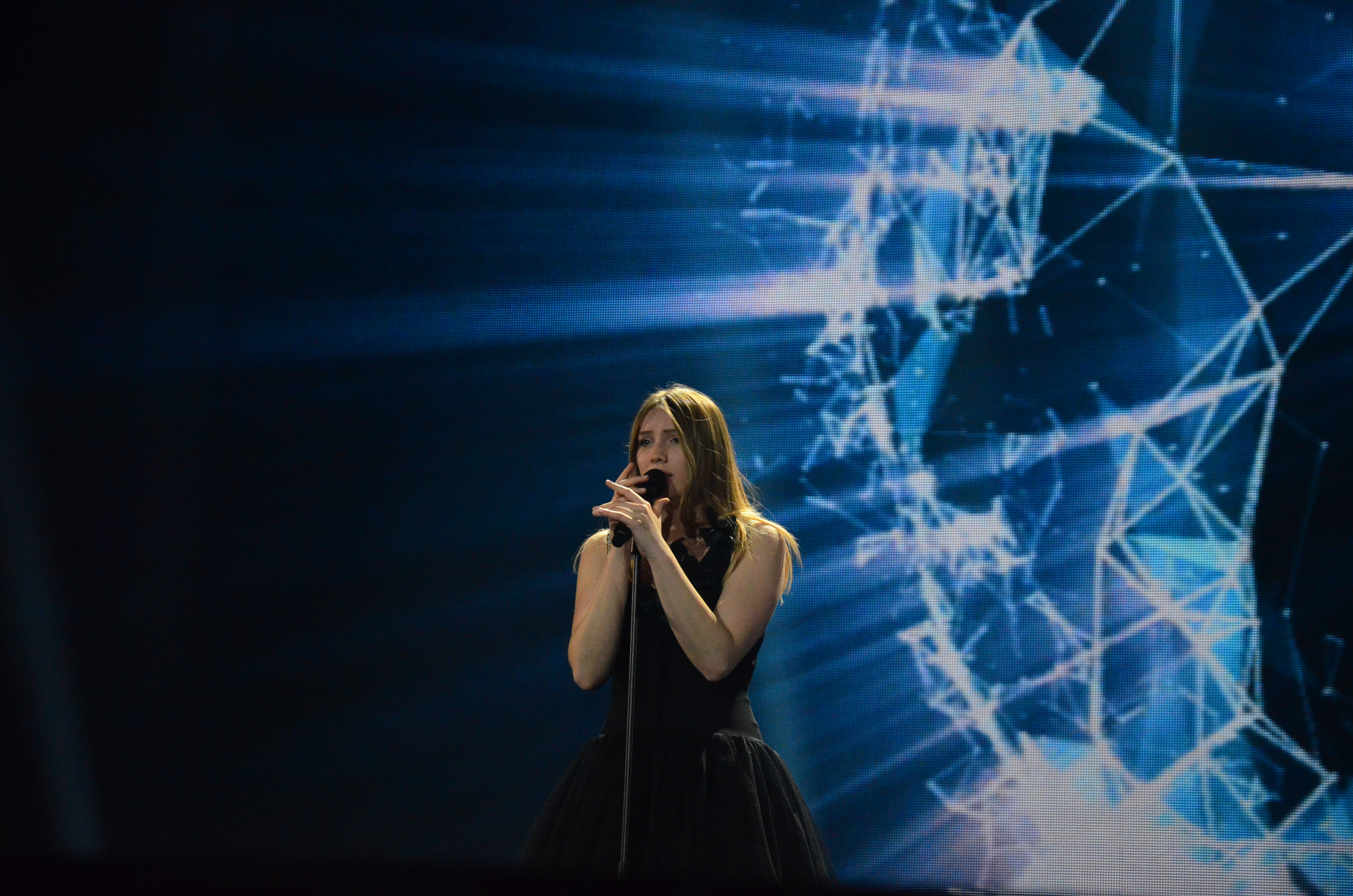
Blanche during a rehearsal before the first semi-final

Blanche took part in technical rehearsals on 30 April and 4 May, followed by dress rehearsals on 8 and 9 May. This included the jury show on 8 May where the professional juries of each country watched and voted on the competing entries.

The Belgian performance featured Blanche in a long black dress designed by Johanne Riss and performing a choreographed hand routine on stage. The stage was in dark blue colours with the use of white lights, and the LED screens displayed white laser lines and shapes as well as a round object imagery that shattered into pieces. Two off-stage backing vocalists joined Blanche during the performance: Jess Peet and Susanna Cork. Susanna Cork would go on to represent the United Kingdom in 2018 under the pseudonym SuRie.

At the end of the show, Belgium was announced as having finished in the top 10 and subsequently qualifying for the grand final. It was later revealed that Belgium placed fourth in the semi-final, receiving a total of 165 points: 125 points from the televoting and 40 points from the juries.

=== Final ===
Shortly after the first semi-final, a winners' press conference was held for the ten qualifying countries. As part of this press conference, the qualifying artists took part in a draw to determine which half of the grand final they would subsequently participate in. This draw was done in the reverse order the countries appeared in the semi-final running order. Belgium was drawn to compete in the second half. Following this draw, the shows' producers decided upon the running order of the final, as they had done for the semi-finals. Belgium was subsequently placed to perform in position 23, following the entry from Ukraine and before the entry from Sweden.

Blanche once again took part in dress rehearsals on 12 and 13 May before the final, including the jury final where the professional juries cast their final votes before the live show. Blanche performed a repeat of his semi-final performance during the final on 12 May. Belgium placed fourth in the final, scoring 363 points: 255 points from the televoting and 108 points from the juries.

=== Voting ===
Voting during the three shows involved each country awarding two sets of points from 1-8, 10 and 12: one from their professional jury and the other from televoting. Each nation's jury consisted of five music industry professionals who are citizens of the country they represent, with their names published before the contest to ensure transparency. This jury judged each entry based on: vocal capacity; the stage performance; the song's composition and originality; and the overall impression by the act. In addition, no member of a national jury was permitted to be related in any way to any of the competing acts in such a way that they cannot vote impartially and independently. The individual rankings of each jury member as well as the nation's televoting results were released shortly after the grand final.

Below is a breakdown of points awarded to Belgium and awarded by Belgium in the first semi-final and grand final of the contest, and the breakdown of the jury voting and televoting conducted during the two shows:

==== Points awarded to Belgium ====
Points awarded to Belgium (Semi-final 1)
Score	Televote	Jury
12 points		
10 points	Finland; Latvia; Sweden	
8 points	Albania; Poland; Portugal; Slovenia; Spain	
7 points	Azerbaijan; Iceland	Poland
6 points	Armenia; Czech Republic; Italy	
5 points	Georgia	Italy; Latvia
4 points	Australia; Cyprus; Greece; United Kingdom	United Kingdom
3 points		Albania; Cyprus; Czech Republic; Sweden
2 points	Montenegro	Iceland; Slovenia; Spain
1 point		Greece

Points awarded to Belgium (Final)
Score	Televote	Jury
12 points	Estonia; Latvia; Poland; Sweden	Ireland
10 points	Finland; Germany; Iceland; Lithuania; Netherlands; Portugal	Latvia; Poland
8 points	Austria; France; Hungary	Israel; Portugal; San Marino
7 points	Norway; Switzerland	Italy
6 points	Belarus; Denmark; Israel; Slovenia	Montenegro; Switzerland
5 points	Albania; Armenia; Croatia; Greece; Ireland; Malta; Romania; San Marino; Ukraine	Slovenia; United Kingdom
4 points	Azerbaijan; Australia; Bulgaria; Czech Republic; Macedonia; Montenegro; Spain	Lithuania; Spain
3 points	Serbia; United Kingdom	Cyprus
2 points	Cyprus; Italy; Moldova	Austria; Denmark; Estonia; Iceland; Netherlands
1 point		Sweden; Ukraine

==== Points awarded by Belgium ====
Points awarded by Belgium (Semi-final 1)
Score	Televote	Jury
12 points	Portugal	Sweden
10 points	Moldova	Australia
8 points	Poland	Cyprus
7 points	Armenia	Portugal
6 points	Greece	Czech Republic
5 points	Sweden	Azerbaijan
4 points	Cyprus	Poland
3 points	Finland	Georgia
2 points	Slovenia	Iceland
1 point	Australia	Moldova

Points awarded by Belgium (Final)
Score	Televote	Jury
12 points	Portugal	Sweden
10 points	Netherlands	Bulgaria
8 points	Bulgaria	Portugal
7 points	Moldova	Norway
6 points	Romania	Australia
5 points	Italy	Cyprus
4 points	Poland	Azerbaijan
3 points	France	Austria
2 points	Sweden	United Kingdom
1 point	Hungary	France

==== Detailed voting results ====
The following members comprised the Belgian jury:

- Jean-François Pottier (jury chairperson) – Head of Music Nostalgie Belgique
- Kevin Cocco – teacher, singer, composer, communication officer
- Tiffany Baworowski (Typh Barrow) – singer, songwriter, composer
- Étienne Baffrey – Founder and Director of radio antipode, teacher at IAD-Radio
- Marie Benmokaddem (Mia Lena) – singer, student

Detailed voting results from Belgium (Semi-final 1)
R/O	Country	Jury							Televote	
R/O	Country	K. Cocco	T. Barrow	J-F. Pottier	É. Baffrey	M. Lena	Rank	Points	Rank	Points
01	Sweden	2	1	1	1	2	1	12	6	5
02	Georgia	9	11	9	4	10	8	3	16	
03	Australia	5	3	4	2	1	2	10	10	1
04	Albania	17	17	14	3	13	14		12	
05	Belgium									
06	Montenegro	15	12	16	17	14	17		14	
07	Finland	11	16	11	10	8	11		8	3
08	Azerbaijan	1	4	2	16	7	6	5	15	
09	Portugal	6	2	6	11	4	4	7	1	12
10	Greece	12	14	10	9	16	12		5	6
11	Poland	7	6	5	5	12	7	4	3	8
12	Moldova	14	9	15	7	6	10	1	2	10
13	Iceland	8	8	7	13	9	9	2	11	
14	Czech Republic	3	7	8	8	3	5	6	13	
15	Cyprus	4	5	3	6	5	3	8	7	4
16	Armenia	10	10	12	12	17	13		4	7
17	Slovenia	13	13	13	15	15	15		9	2
18	Latvia	16	15	17	14	11	16		17	

Detailed voting results from Belgium (Final)
R/O	Country	Jury							Televote	
R/O	Country	K. Cocco	T. Barrow	J-F. Pottier	É. Baffrey	M. Lena	Rank	Points	Rank	Points
01	Israel	25	23	25	18	21	24		19	
02	Poland	18	11	15	13	16	14		7	4
03	Belarus	10	18	9	10	14	12		20	
04	Austria	5	9	14	11	4	8	3	15	
05	Armenia	14	14	17	17	15	15		12	
06	Netherlands	9	21	21	19	17	19		2	10
07	Moldova	22	15	18	2	11	13		4	7
08	Hungary	23	13	24	24	19	22		10	1
09	Italy	12	7	2	23	12	11		6	5
10	Denmark	15	20	12	16	22	18		25	
11	Portugal	7	3	3	4	6	3	8	1	12
12	Azerbaijan	3	8	8	8	8	7	4	21	
13	Croatia	24	25	23	25	20	25		11	
14	Australia	6	4	11	9	3	5	6	17	
15	Greece	20	22	16	15	23	20		13	
16	Spain	13	17	22	22	10	17		24	
17	Norway	2	5	10	5	5	4	7	18	
18	United Kingdom	11	12	7	7	9	9	2	16	
19	Cyprus	8	6	5	3	13	6	5	14	
20	Romania	21	24	20	20	18	23		5	6
21	Germany	16	16	13	14	24	16		22	
22	Ukraine	17	19	19	21	25	21		23	
23	Belgium									
24	Sweden	1	1	1	1	2	1	12	9	2
25	Bulgaria	4	2	6	6	1	2	10	3	8
26	France	19	10	4	12	7	10	1	8	3
