= Blanche (singer) =

Belgian singer and songwriter

- Blanche in Madrid, Spain before her performance at OGAE Spain's festival Music On 2023

Background information
- Born: Ellie Noa Blanche Delvaux; 10 June 1999 (age 27); Uccle, Brussels, Belgium
- Genres: Indie pop
- Occupations: Singer; songwriter
- Instrument: Vocals
- Years active: 2016–present
- Label: PIAS Belgium
- Website: http://www.blanche-music.be/

Ellie Noa Blanche Delvaux (French pronunciation: [eli nɔa blɑ̃ʃ dɛlvo]; born 10 June 1999), better known mononymously as Blanche [blɑ̃ʃ], is a Belgian singer and songwriter. She represented Belgium in the Eurovision Song Contest 2017 in Kyiv, Ukraine with the song "City Lights", finishing in fourth place. Blanche previously competed on season five of The Voice Belgique, where she was a member of Team Cats on Trees.

== Early life ==
Ellie Delvaux was born in Belgium, on 10 June 1999. She is Jewish and speaks French, English, and Hebrew. As a child, she liked to sing to herself. She later attended musical theatre classes and took part in school performances. When she turned 16, she auditioned for The Voice. After Eurovision, she hoped to complete secondary school in Belgium. Her stage name, "Blanche", is her third name.

== Career ==
=== 2016: The Voice Belgique ===
In January 2016, Blanche auditioned for season five of The Voice Belgique performing Adele's "Daydreamer", with two of four coaches turning for her. She eventually chose to join team Cats on Trees. During the Duels, Blanche battled Charlotte Villers singing Radiohead's "Creep", and Blanche won the duel to make it through to the live shows. During the first live show, she performed Aurora's "Running with the Wolves". She was saved by the coach and progressed to the next round. In the next round, she performed "Runnin' (Lose It All)". She was not saved by her coach and was eliminated from the show.

Performances
Performed	Song	Original artist	Result
Blind audition	"Daydreamer"	Adele	Joined Team Cats on Trees
Duels	"Creep" (against Charlotte Villers)	Radiohead	Winner
Week 1	"Running with the Wolves"	Aurora	Saved by coach
Week 2	"Runnin' (Lose It All)"	Naughty Boy (featuring Beyoncé and Arrow Benjamin)	Eliminated

=== 2017–2018: Eurovision Song Contest 2017 ===
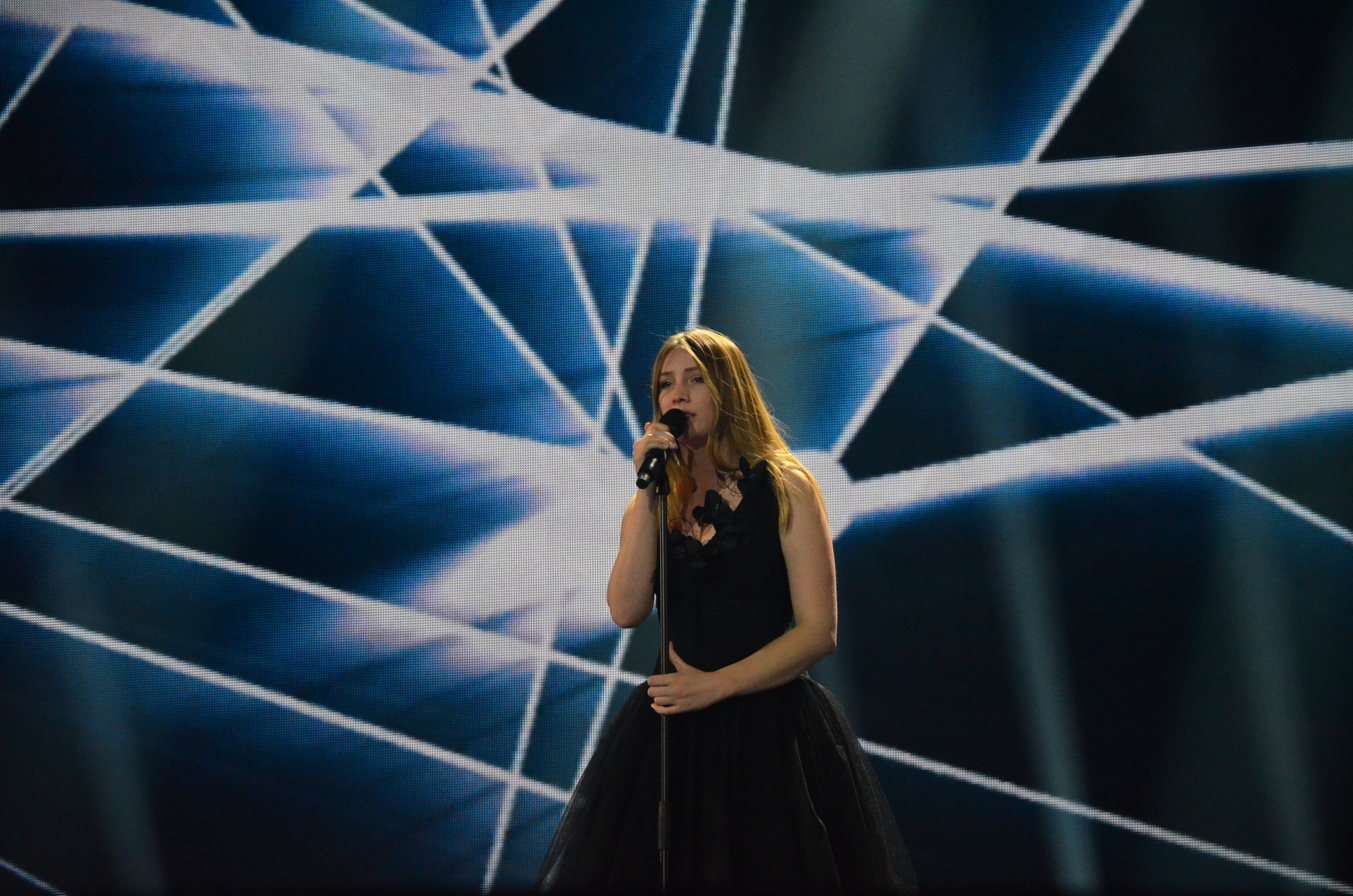
Blanche (age 17) during Eurovision rehearsals (2017).

On 22 November 2016, broadcaster Radio Télévision Belge de la Communauté Française (RTBF) announced that they had internally selected Blanche to represent Belgium in the Eurovision Song Contest 2017 in Kyiv, Ukraine. Her song, "City Lights", was supposed to have been released on 8 March 2017, but it was instead leaked the day before. When her song was announced she jumped to the second place in the betting odds but was later lowered.

"City Lights" was accused of plagiarising the song "Eclats" from Canadian singer Alexe Gaudreault, but Pierre Dumoulin, the author of the song, denied these claims:

"It is obvious that there are similarities in the melody as can be found in a hundred or even a thousand current melodies."

At Eurovision, Belgium was allocated to the first semi-final, which took place on 9 May 2017. Blanche received 40 points from the professional juries and 125 points from televoters, for a combined total of 165 points, placing fourth in the semi-final and advancing to the grand final.

At the grand final, on 13 May 2017, Blanche performed 23rd, receiving 108 points from the professional juries and 255 points from televoters, for a combined total of 363 points, again placing fourth. Following Blanche's success at Eurovision, "City Lights" spent two weeks atop the charts in Flanders, as well as two weeks at number 2 in Wallonia. In August 2018, "City Lights" was certified double platinum in Belgium, for sales exceeding 40,000 copies. "City Lights" also charted across Europe, including in France, Germany, Spain and Sweden.

Since Eurovision, Blanche has won a 2018 European Border Breakers Award, which recognizes emerging artists that have achieved success outside their home country. In Belgium, Blanche won Pop Artist of the Year and Revelation of the Year at French-Belgian broadcaster RTBF's 2018 D6bels Music Awards and Hit of the Year (for "City Lights") and Breakthrough Artist at the Flemish 2018 Music Industry Awards (MIA).

=== 2018–2020: Empire ===
On 25 May 2018, Blanche released the single "Wrong Turn". A music video was released to Blanche's official YouTube channel on 19 June 2018. It was directed by Nur Casadevall. The song "Soon" was released on 20 July 2018, along with a lyric video. On 16 November 2018, Blanche released the single "Moment", which is about "living in the present, trying to forget about any doubts and fears you have…we have to let ourselves live. If we don’t learn to enjoy the present moment, then we might regret it when it’s over...”. She also said that the song is "for all the people who sometimes struggle to connect with the present moment, who feel like they’re looking at their lives from the outside". A music video was released on the same day and was directed by Eve Mahoney. The song spent 14 weeks in the top 50 in Wallonia, peaking at number 22, making it Blanche's highest-peaking single since "City Lights". A piano version of "Moment" was released on 14 December 2018. Blanche appeared three times on Wiwibloggs' list of the best songs of 2018 by artists who have participated in the Eurovision Song Contest: with "Moment" at number 7, "Soon" at number 21 and "Wrong Turn" at number 43.

On 30 January 2020, Blanche announced that the single "Empire" would be released on 14 February 2020. The song was released a day earlier, on 13 February 2020. "Empire" is about people who wear shields to shield themselves from all emotions and ultimately deceive themselves. A music video for the song premiered on the same day on Complex. The video was directed by Valéry Joseph and filmed at Studio Stories in Ghent. The video's imagery was inspired by surrealist paintings, particularly those of Gertrude Abercrombie. In the video, there is limited movement, instead it relies on bold outfits, colours and lighting to express an emotional message of "fear, power, abandonment, pain, introversion, self-unveiling, trust and authenticity". Blanche started writing the song in her studio in Brussels in November 2017, but the song continued to evolve with the involvement of new collaborators, until it was completed in March 2019. On 14 February 2020, Blanche announced that her debut album, titled Empire would be released on 24 April 2020. The single "Fences" was premiered on Clash on 26 March 2020, before being released the following day. On 1 April 2020, Blanche announced that the release of her debut album would be delayed until 29 May 2020, due to the COVID-19 pandemic. On 8 May 2020, Blanche released the single "1, 2, Miss You". The song is included on the album Empire along with the previous singles "Soon", "Empire" and "Fences". Empire debuted and peaked at number 7 in Wallonia, and at number 22 in Flanders. On 26 June 2020, "Till We Collide" was released as the album's fourth single. On 28 August 2020, "Summer Nights" was released as the fifth single from Empire.

=== 2022–present: Hiatus and recent appearances ===
In February 2022, she announced that she had begun studying cinema and filmmaking for five years.

On September 29, 2023, after a 19-month hiatus, Blanche released the song "Shattered" written for the movie "Het Smelt" (also known by its English-language title "When It Melts"). On October 7, she performed at OGAE Spain's event Music On 2023. On October 18, her songs "Shattered - Reprise" and "Red Stop Sign" were released as part of the whole soundtrack of "Het Smelt" as well.

== Personal life ==
Blanche's brother is the singer-songwriter Oliver Lord.

Blanche has been a member of the Zionist youth organization Hashomer Hatzair since first grade. In 2017, she became a counselor for eighth-graders.

== Discography ==
=== Studio albums ===
Title	Details	Peak chart positions	
Title	Details	BEL (FL)	BEL (WA)
Empire	Released: 29 May 2020; Format: Digital download, streaming, CD; Label: PIAS Belgium	22	7

=== Singles ===
Title	Year	Peak chart positions									Certifications	Album
Title	Year	BEL (FL)	BEL (WA)	AUT	FRA	GER	NLD	SPA	SWE	SWI	Certifications	Album
"City Lights"	2017	1	2	14	35	38	39	21	18	24	BEA: 2× Platinum	Non-album single
"Wrong Turn"	2018	— (Note: "Wrong Turn" did not reach the Flemish Ultratop 50 chart, but was registered on the Ultratip Bubbling Under ranking.)	75	—	—	—	—	—	—	—		Non-album single
"Soon"	2018	— (Note: "Soon" did not reach the Flemish Ultratop 50 chart, but was registered on the Ultratip Bubbling Under ranking.)	82	—	—	—	—	—	—	—		Empire
"Moment"	2018	63	22	—	—	—	—	—	—	—		Non-album single
"Empire"	2020	— (Note: "Empire" did not reach the Flemish Ultratop 50 chart, but was registered on the Ultratip Bubbling Under ranking.)	— (Note: "Empire" did not reach the region's Ultratop 50 chart, but was registered on the Ultratip Bubbling Under ranking.)	—	—	—	—	—	—	—		Empire
"Fences"	2020	— (Note: "Fences" did not reach the Flemish Ultratop 50 chart, but was registered on the Ultratip Bubbling Under ranking.)	67	—	—	—	—	—	—	—		Empire
"1, 2, Miss You"	2020	— (Note: "1, 2, Miss You" did not reach the Flemish Ultratop 50 chart, but was registered on the Ultratip Bubbling Under ranking.)	87	—	—	—	—	—	—	—		Empire
"Till We Collide"	2020	—	—	—	—	—	—	—	—	—		Empire
"Summer Nights"	2020	—	74	—	—	—	—	—	—	—		Empire
"Shattered" (With Bjorn Eriksson)	2023	—	—	—	—	—	—	—	—	—		From the movie "Het Smelt"/"When It Melts"
"Shattered - Reprise" (With Bjorn Eriksson)	2023	—	—	—	—	—	—	—	—	—		From the movie "Het Smelt"/"When It Melts"
"Red Stop Sign" (With Bjorn Eriksson)	2023	—	—	—	—	—	—	—	—	—		From the movie "Het Smelt"/"When It Melts"
"—" denotes a recording that did not chart or was not released in that territory.

=== Music videos ===
Title	Year	Director(s)	Ref
"City Lights"	2017	Simon Vanrie & Brice VDH	
"Wrong Turn"	2018	Nur Casadevall	
"Moment"	2018	Eve Mahoney	
"Moment" (Piano Version)	2018	Unknown	
"Empire"	2020	Valéry Joseph	

== Footnotes ==
Preceded by Laura Tesoro with "What's the Pressure"	Belgium in the Eurovision Song Contest; 2017	Succeeded by Sennek with "A Matter of Time"
