= Wrong Turn =

Wrong Turn or Wrong Turns may refer to:

- Wrong Turn (film series), seven different films, including:
  - Wrong Turn (2003 film), a horror film by Rob Schmidt
  - Wrong Turn (2021 film), a slasher film by Mike P. Nelson
- "Wrong Turn" (song), a song by Blanche
- "Wrong Turn", a song by Kim Petras from Turn Off the Light
- "Wrong Turns", a song by Old Dominion from Meat and Candy
