= Laura Tesoro =

Belgian singer and actress (born 1996)

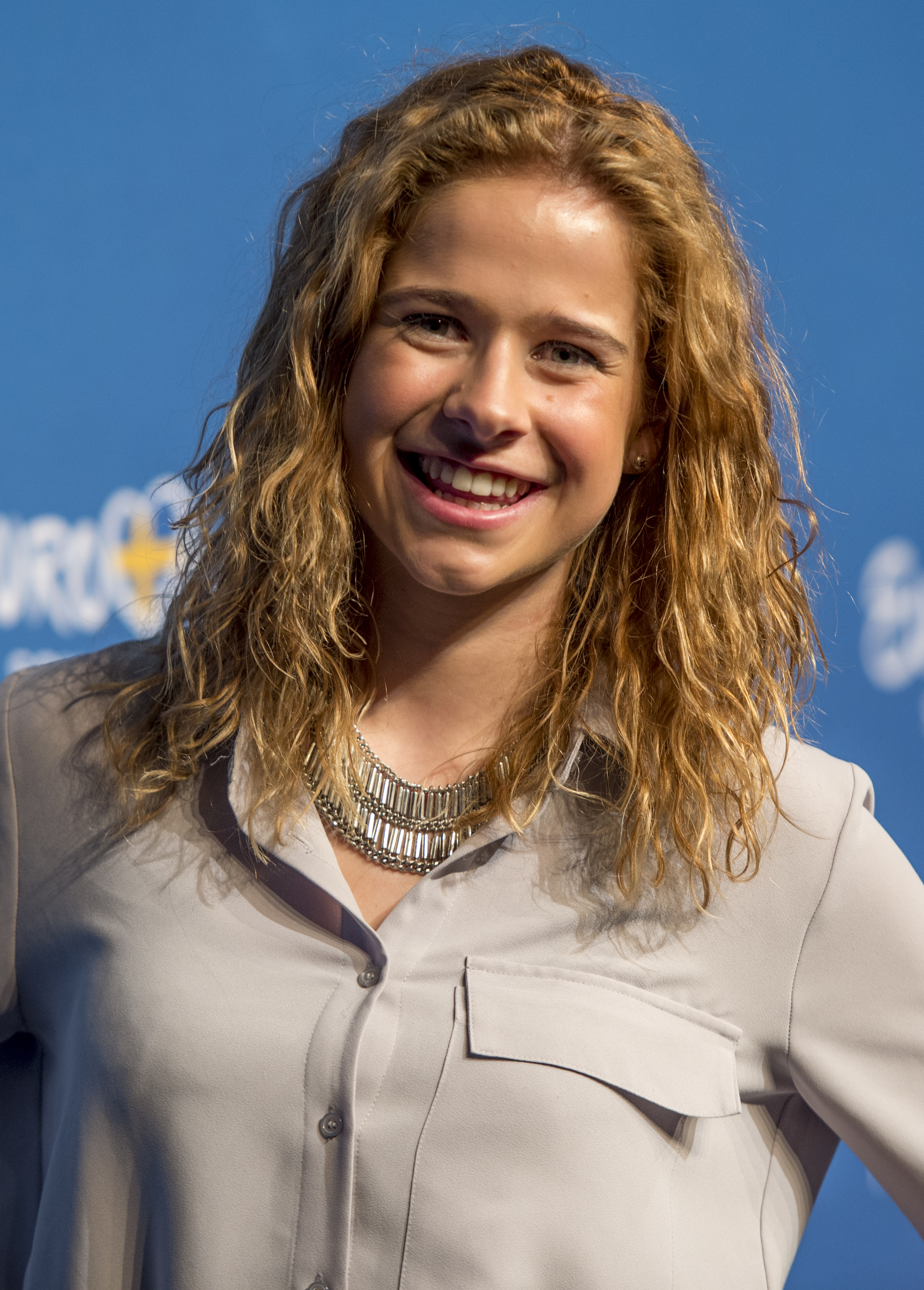
- Tesoro in 2016

Background information
- Born: 19 August 1996 (age 30); Antwerp, Belgium
- Genres: Pop; R&B; funk; dance
- Occupations: Singer; actress
- Instrument: Vocals
- Years active: 2008–present

Laura Tesoro (born 19 August 1996) is a Belgian singer and actress. She represented Belgium in the Eurovision Song Contest 2016 with the song "What's the Pressure". Tesoro is also known for portraying Charlotte on the Flemish soap opera Familie and placing second on season three of The Voice van Vlaanderen. She was a coach on The Voice Kids, and is currently a coach on The Voice van Vlaanderen.

== Biography ==
=== 1996–2014: Early life and career beginnings ===
Tesoro was born on 19 August 1996 in Antwerp to an Italian father and a Belgian mother. She had her first acting role in the Flemish crime drama Witse as Evy Cuypers in 2008 and went on to perform in musicals such as Annie and Domino. She performed at Ketnetpop in 2009. From 2012 to 2014, she appeared as Charlotte in Familie, a love interest to Guido. In 2014 she appeared in season three of The Voice van Vlaanderen, where she ended up as the runner-up. Throughout her time on the show, she was a member of Team Koen. She released her debut single "Outta Here" the same year, which peaked at number 23 on the Belgian Flemish Singles Chart.

=== 2015–2023: Eurovision Song Contest ===
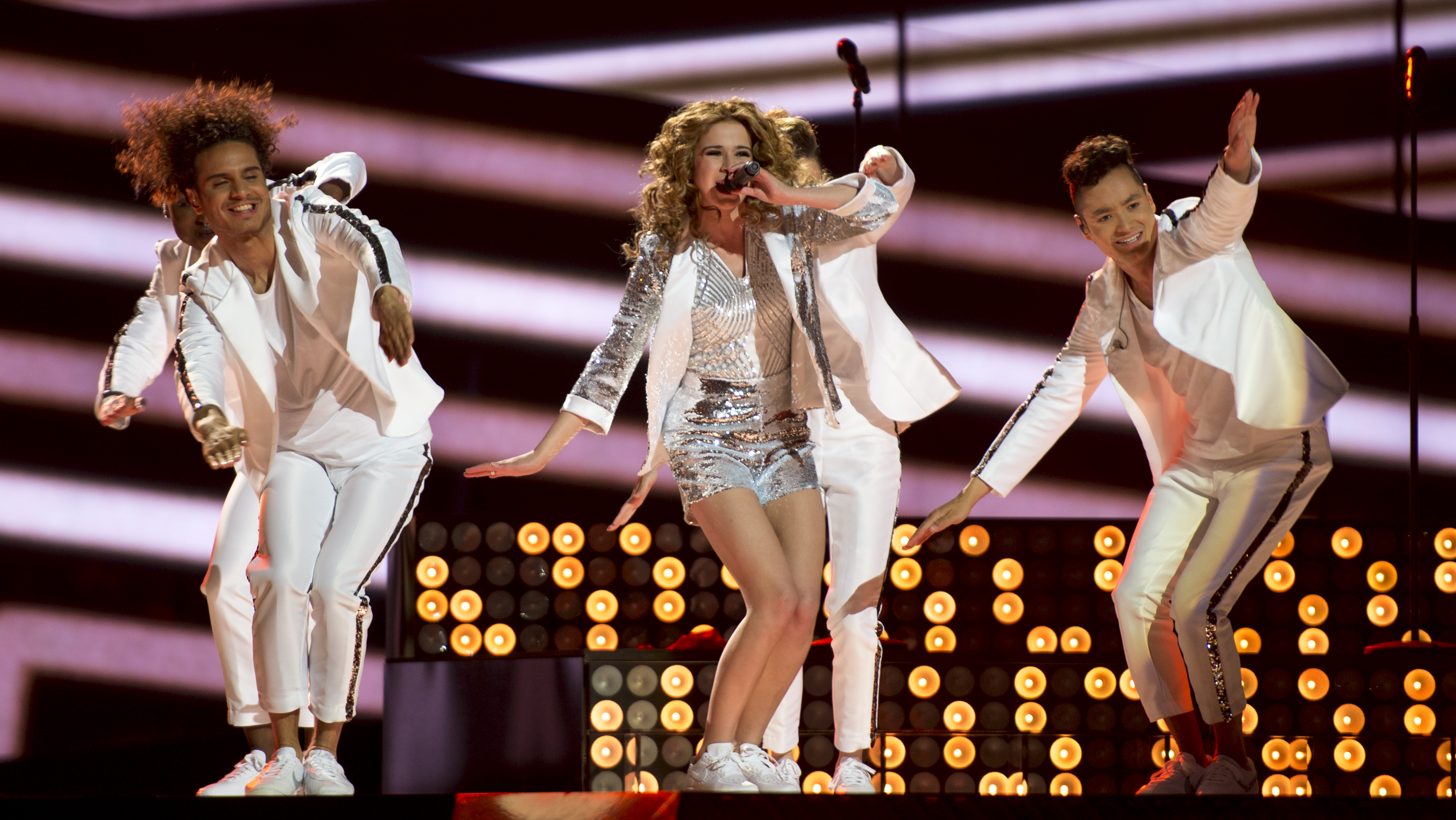
Laura Tesoro performed at the Eurovision Song Contest 2016.

In 2015, she released her second single "Funky Love". In November 2015, Tesoro was announced as one of the five participants of Eurosong 2016. In the first show, she covered the song "Düm Tek Tek" by Hadise, which represented Turkey in the Eurovision Song Contest 2009. In the second show, she revealed her Eurovision candidate song "What's the Pressure", and received the highest televoting score. In the final on 17 January 2016, she was declared the winner after placing first with both the Belgian public and international juries. She represented Belgium in the Eurovision Song Contest 2016 in Stockholm, where she placed tenth in the final. In the same year, Tesoro played the role of Poppy in the Flemish version of DreamWorks' Trolls. On 28 April 2017, she released the single "Higher": the song peaked at number 20 on the Flemish Singles Chart. On 27 October 2017, she released the single "Beast", which was available for pre-save on Spotify on 20 October, seven days prior. She is also a well-accomplished boxer, and her single "Beast" has a music video showing her boxing skills.

From 2017 to 2023, Tesoro was a coach on The Voice Kids Vlaanderen.

In late 2019, Tesoro released the single "Limits". The song served as the lead single to her debut album. A few weeks later she added "Press Pause" as the second single, after releasing her debut album on 24 October 2019.

From 2021 to 2024, Tesoro was a "Comeback Stage" coach, mentoring previously eliminated artists, on The Voice van Vlaanderen. In 2024, she became the winning coach when she coached Christophe Verholle to victory. Beginning in 2026, she joined the panel as a main coach.

In 2025, she became one of the artists for the talent show, Lift You Up, where she won with her match, Anna Winkin and toured with her.

== Discography ==
=== Album ===
Title	Details	Peak chart positions
Title	Details	BEL (Fl)
Limits	Released: 24 October 2019; Format: Digital download, CD; Label: Sony Music Entertainment	3

=== Singles ===
Title	Year	Peak chart positions				Certifications	Album
Title	Year	BEL (Fl)	AUT	FRA	SWE	Certifications	Album
"Outta Here"	2014	23	—	—	—		Non-album singles
"Funky Love"	2015	— (Note: "Funky Love" did not enter the Ultratop 50, but peaked at number 27 on the Flemish Ultratop chart.)	—	—	—		Non-album singles
"What's the Pressure"	2016	2	75	103	82	BEA: Gold	Non-album singles
"Higher"	2017	20	—	—	—		Non-album singles
"Beast"	2017	25	—	—	—		Non-album singles
"Mutual"	2018	23	—	—	—		Non-album singles
"Up"	2019	34	—	—	—		Non-album singles
"Thinking About You All the Time" (live)	2019	44	—	—	—		Non-album singles
"Limits"	2019	35	—	—	—		Limits
"Press Pause"	2019	21	—	—	—		Limits
"Hold On"	2020	36	—	—	—		Limits
"Brussels by Night"	2020	— (Note: "Brussels by Night" did not enter the Ultratop 50, but peaked at number 8 on the Flemish Ultratop chart.)	—	—	—		Non-album singles
"Strangers" (with Loïc Nottet featuring Alex Germys)	2020	13	—	—	—	BEA: Gold	Non-album singles
"Not Easy"	2022	39	—	—	—		Non-album singles
"These Nights" (with Oski)	2023	—	—	—	—		Non-album singles
"Bad Ain't That Bad"	2023	37	—	—	—		Non-album singles
"Oya lélé"	2024	49	—	—	—		Non-album singles
"So Naive"	2024	—	—	—	—		Non-album singles
"Verder gaan"	2024	—	—	—	—		Non-album singles
"Shining"	2025	26	—	—	—		Non-album singles
"Bound to Be" (with Regi)	2026	18	—	—	—		Non-album singles
"Plastic Paradise"	2026	38	—	—	—		Non-album singles
"Hyde Park"	2026	28	—	—	—		Non-album singles
"—" denotes a single that did not chart or were not released.

== Awards and nominations ==
Year	Award	Category	Result
2016	MTV Europe Music Awards	Best Belgian Act	Nominated

== Filmography ==
Year	Title	Role	Notes
2008	Witse	Evy Cuypers	Episode: "Innige band"
2012–14	Familie	Charlotte Kennis	73 episodes
2014, 2021–	The Voice van Vlaanderen	Herself	Contestant (2014), "Comeback Stage" Coach (seasons 7-9), (Main Coach season 10-)
2015	Altijd prijs	Julie Aerts	3 episodes
2016	Trolls	Poppy	Flemish version
2016	Moana	Moana	Flemish version
2017–2023	The Voice Kids	Herself	Coach
2018	Ralph Breaks the Internet	Moana	Flemish version
2019	Studio Tarara	Dancer 1	Episode: "1.4"

== Notes ==
Preceded by Loïc Nottet with "Rhythm Inside"	Belgium in the Eurovision Song Contest; 2016	Succeeded by Blanche with "City Lights"
