= Funky Love =

Funky Love may refer to:

- Funky Love (Laura Tesoro song), 2015
- Funky Love (Kavana song), 1998
