= Outta Here (Laura Tesoro song) =

Single by Laura Tesoro
- Released: 27 August 2014
- Recorded: 2014
- Genre: Pop
- Length: 3:07
- Label: Top Act Music
- Songwriter(s): Tom Lodewyckx; Eva Jane Smeenk; Laura Tesoro
- Producer(s): Tom Lodewyckx

Laura Tesoro singles chronology
"Outta Here" (2014)	"Funky Love" (2015)

"Outta Here" is a song by Belgian singer and actress Laura Tesoro. The song was released as a digital download in Belgium on 27 August 2014 through Top Act Music. It has peaked at number 23 in Flanders, and was written by Tom Lodewyckx, Eva Jane Smeenk and Laura Tesoro.

== Music video ==
A music video to accompany the release of "Outta Here" was first released onto YouTube on 27 August 2014 at a total length of three minutes and ten seconds.

== Track listing ==
Digital download
No.	Title	Length
1.	"Outta Here"	3:07

== Charts ==
Chart (2014)	Peak position
Belgium (Ultratop 50 Flanders)	23

== Release history ==
Region	Date	Format	Label
Belgium	27 August 2014	Digital download	Top Act Music
