= Fences (song) =

Single by Blanche

from the album Empire
- Released: 27 March 2020
- Genre: Ambient pop
- Length: 3:23
- Label: PIAS Belgium
- Songwriter(s): Ellie Delvaux; François Gustin; Thomas Medard
- Producer(s): François Gustin; Rich Cooper

Blanche singles chronology
| "Empire" (2020) | "Fences" (2020) | "1, 2, Miss You" (2020) |

"Fences" is a song by Belgian singer and songwriter Blanche. It was released as a digital download on 27 March 2020 by PIAS Belgium as the second single from her debut studio album Empire.

== Background ==
She announced the release of her new single on her Instagram account, she said, "Hey, I'm happy to announce that my my new single 'Fences' will be out on March 27. It is the fourth track of my album 'Empire' to be out April 24! Stay tuned."

== Critical reception ==
Jonathan Vautrey of Wiwibloggs said, "'Fences' sees Blanche turn the BPM up a bit and is perhaps her most danceable track to date (at least in the chorus). But, it's still well within her moody-pop repertoire. A drum beat underlines the song, while electronic instrumentation is added into the chorus to create dynamism."

== Charts ==
| Chart (2020) | Peak position |
|---|---|
| Belgium (Ultratip Flanders) | — (Note: "Fences" did not reach the Flemish Ultratop 50 chart, but was registered on the Ultratip Bubbling Under ranking, although its peak position was not revealed.) |
| Belgium (Ultratip Bubbling Under Wallonia) | 17 |

== Release history ==
| Region | Date | Format | Label |
|---|---|---|---|
| Belgium | 27 March 2020 | Digital download; streaming | PIAS Belgium |
