= Empire (Blanche song) =

Single by Blanche

from the album Empire
- Released: 13 February 2020
- Recorded: 2018
- Genre: Synth-pop
- Length: 4:57
- Label: PIAS Belgium
- Songwriter(s): Ellie Delvaux; Pierre Dumoulin; Gilles Vogt; Joe Hammil; Rich Cooper
- Producer(s): Rich Cooper

Blanche singles chronology
"Moment" (2018)	"Empire" (2020)	"Fences" (2020)

"Empire" is a song by Belgian singer and songwriter Blanche. It was released as a digital download on 13 February 2020 by PIAS Belgium as the lead single from her debut studio album Empire.

== Background ==
On her Instagram account, Blanche said, "I couldn't be happier with the way things have turned out and I truely [sic] hope the song reaches your heart."

== Charts ==
Chart (2020)	Peak position
Belgium (Ultratip Flanders)	— (Note: "Empire" did not reach the Flemish Ultratop 50 chart, but was registered on the Ultratip Bubbling Under ranking, although its peak position was not revealed.)
Belgium (Ultratip Wallonia)	— (Note: "Empire" did not reach the region's Ultratop 50 chart, but was registered on the Ultratip Bubbling Under ranking, although its peak position was not revealed.)

== Release history ==
Region	Date	Format	Label
Belgium	13 February 2020	Digital download; streaming	PIAS Belgium
