= Moment (Blanche song) =

Single by Blanche
- Released: 16 November 2018
- Recorded: 2018
- Genre: Pop
- Length: 3:19
- Label: PIAS Belgium
- Songwriter(s): Ellie Delvaux; Pierre Dumoulin; Andras Vleminckx; Rich Cooper; Gilles Vogt; Liam Roth
- Producer(s): Rich Cooper

Blanche singles chronology
"Soon" (2018)	"Moment" (2018)	"Empire" (2020)

Music video
- "Moment" on YouTube

"Moment" is a song by Belgian singer and songwriter Blanche. It was released as a digital download on 16 November 2018 by PIAS Belgium. The song was written by Ellie Delvaux, Pierre Dumoulin, Andras Vleminckx, Rich Cooper, Gilles Vogt and Liam Roth.

== Background ==
Blanche has said that the song is about "living in the present, trying to forget about any doubts and fears you have…we have to let ourselves live. If we don't learn to enjoy the present moment, then we might regret it when it's over". She also said that the song is "for all the people who sometimes struggle to connect with the present moment, who feel like they’re looking at their lives from the outside". A music video was released on the same day and was directed by Eve Mahoney.

== Track listing ==
- Digital download
1. "Moment" – 3:19
- Digital download – Piano Version
1. "Moment" (Piano Version) – 3:28

== Charts ==
Chart (2018–19)	Peak position
Belgium (Ultratip Bubbling Under Flanders)	13
Belgium (Ultratop 50 Wallonia)	22

== Release history ==
Region	Date	Format	Version	Label	Ref.
Belgium	16 November 2018	Digital download; streaming	Original	PIAS Belgium	
Belgium	14 December 2018	Digital download; streaming	Piano Version	PIAS Belgium	
