= 1, 2, Miss You =

2020 song by Belgian singer Blanche

Single by Blanche

from the album Empire
- Released: 8 May 2020
- Genre: Synth-pop
- Length: 3:38
- Label: PIAS Belgium
- Songwriter(s): Ellie Delvaux; Jessica Sharman; Rich Cooper
- Producer(s): Rich Cooper

Blanche singles chronology
"Fences" (2020)	"1, 2, Miss You" (2020)

"1, 2, Miss You" is a song by Belgian singer and songwriter Blanche. It was released as a digital download on 8 May 2020 by PIAS Belgium as the third single from her debut studio album Empire. The song was written by Ellie Delvaux, Jessica Sharman and Rich Cooper.

== Critical reception ==
Jonathan Vautrey of Wiwibloggs said, "It's a mid-tempo alternative-pop track that balances light and dark elements to create an almost ethereal atmosphere."

== Charts ==
Chart (2020)	Peak position
Belgium (Ultratip Flanders)	— (Note: "Fences" did not reach the Flemish Ultratop 50 chart, but was registered on the Ultratip Bubbling Under ranking, although its peak position was not revealed.)
Belgium (Ultratip Bubbling Under Wallonia)	37

== Release history ==
Region	Date	Format	Label
Belgium	8 May 2020	Digital download; streaming	PIAS Belgium
