= Press Pause =

Single by Laura Tesoro

from the album Limits
- Released: 8 November 2019
- Recorded: 2019
- Genre: Pop
- Length: 3:08
- Label: Sony Music Entertainment Belgium
- Songwriter(s): Laura Tesoro; Steven Vergauwen; Elias Näslin; Isabelle Gbotto; Philip Holmgren
- Producer(s): Philip Holmgren

Laura Tesoro singles chronology
| "Limits" (2019) | "Press Pause" (2019) | "Hold On" (2020) |

"Press Pause" is song performed by Belgian singer Laura Tesoro. The song was released as the second single of her debut album Limits, on 08 November 2019 by Sony Music Entertainment Belgium. The song peaked at number 21 in Belgium. The song was written by Laura Tesoro, Isabelle Gbotto, Elias Näslin, Stever Vergauwen and produced by Philip Holmgren.

== Track listing ==
Digital download
| No. | Title | Length |
|---|---|---|
| 1. | "Press Pause" | 3:28 |

== Charts ==
=== Weekly charts ===
| Chart (2020) | Peak position |
|---|---|
| Belgium (Ultratop 50 Flanders) | 21 |

=== Year-end charts ===
| Chart (2020) | Position |
|---|---|
| Belgium (Ultratop Flanders) | 78 |

== Release history ==
Release history for "Press Pause"
| Region | Date | Format | Label |
|---|---|---|---|
| Belgium | 8 November 2019 | Digital download; streaming | Sony Music Entertainment Belgium |
