= Strangers (Laura Tesoro and Loïc Nottet song) =

2020 song

Single by Laura Tesoro and Loïc Nottet featuring Alex Germys
- Released: 6 November 2020
- Length: 3:18
- Label: Sony Music
- Songwriters: Amy Morrey; Laura Tesoro; Loïc Nottet
- Producer: Alex Germys

Laura Tesoro singles chronology
"Brussels by Night" (2020)	"Strangers" (2020)

Loïc Nottet singles chronology
"TWYM" (2020)	"Strangers" (2020)	"Start It from the End" (2021)

"Strangers" is a song by Belgian singers Laura Tesoro and Loïc Nottet, featuring Alex Germys. It was released on 6 November 2020 by Sony Music. The song was written by Amy Morrey, Laura Tesoro, Loïc Nottet and produced by Alex Germys.

== Lyric video ==
A lyric video to accompany the release of "Strangers" was first released on YouTube on 5 November 2020.

== Critical reception ==
Jordi Pedra of Wiwibloggs wrote, "It's a mid-tempo piece that serves attitude and discusses the difficulties of love when things aren't working out anymore. Despite the relatively slow rhythm, the listener is drawn in by the song's message and the vocal delivery of Nottet and Tesoro's distinctive voices. Loïc kicks things off with a powerful start, then Laura harmonises with him in the chorus before taking over as the song seamlessly flows into the second verse. As the end approaches, the duo meets again to explode in vocal perfection and sentiment."

== Personnel ==
Credits adapted from Tidal.

- Alex Germys – Producer, composer, lyricist, associated performer
- Laura Tesoro – Composer, lyricist, associated performer
- Loïc Nottet – Composer, lyricist, associated performer
- Amy Morrey – Lyricist
- Charles De Schutter – Mixing Engineer
- Jerboa Mastering – Mixing Engineer

== Charts ==
=== Weekly charts ===
Weekly chart performance for "Strangers"
Chart (2020–2021)	Peak position
Belgium (Ultratop 50 Flanders)	13
Belgium (Ultratop 50 Wallonia)	4

=== Year-end charts ===
Year-end chart performance for "Strangers"
Chart (2021)	Position
Belgium (Ultratop Flanders)	69
Belgium (Ultratop Wallonia)	53

== Certifications ==
Certifications for "Strangers"
Region	Certification	Certified units/sales
Belgium (BRMA)	Gold	10,000^{‡}
^{‡} Sales+streaming figures based on certification alone.
