= Empire (Blanche album) =

Studio album by Blanche
- Released: 29 May 2020
- Genre: Indie pop
- Length: 46:00
- Label: PIAS Belgium
- Producer: Rich Cooper; François Gustin

Singles from Empire
- 1. "Soon" Released: 20 July 2018; 2. "Empire" Released: 13 February 2020; 3. "Fences" Released: 27 March 2020; 4. "1, 2, Miss You" Released: 8 May 2020; 5. "Till We Collide" Released: 26 June 2020; 6. "Summer Nights" Released: 28 August 2020

Empire is the debut studio album by Belgian singer and songwriter Blanche. It was released on 29 May 2020 by PIAS Belgium. The album includes the singles "Empire", "Fences", "1, 2, Miss You" and "Soon".

== Background ==
Talking about the album, Blanche said on her official website, "Empire is an album to be digested from start to finish, whereby every song has been placed with intention. Empire is rich in arrangements, nuanced in its rhythms and dripped in diversified themes. This is my album; these are my songs and my feelings. Some songs are more personal, others are like modern tales."

== Singles ==
"Empire" was released as the lead single from the album on 13 February 2020. "Fences" was released as the second single from the album on 27 March 2020. "1, 2, Miss You" was released as the third single from the album on 8 May 2020. "Till We Collide" was released as the fourth single on 26 June 2020. "Summer Nights" was released as the album's fifth single on 28 August 2020.

"Soon", released as a single on 20 July 2018, was also included on the album.

== Track listing ==
Empire track listing
No.	Title	Writer(s)	Producer(s)	Length
1.	"Intro"	Ellie Delvaux; Pierre Dumoulin; Gilles Vogt; Joe Hammil; Rich Cooper	Rich Cooper	0:18
2.	"Empire"	Delvaux; Dumoulin; Vogt; Hammil; Cooper	Cooper	4:57
3.	"Till We Collide"	Delvaux; Johnny Lattimer; Phil Cook	Cooper	3:21
4.	"Fences"	Delvaux; François Gustin; Thomas Medard	François Gustin; Cooper	3:23
5.	"Only You"	Delvaux; Dumoulin; Medard	Cooper	3:55
6.	"Lonely"	Delvaux; Henri Peiffer; Johannes Genard	Rich Cooper	3:28
7.	"How Does That Sound"	Delvaux; Laura Welsh; Cooper	Cooper	3:28
8.	"Soon"	Delvaux; Toma Médard	Gustin	3:17
9.	"1, 2, Miss You"	Delvaux; Jessica Sharman; Cooper	Cooper	3:38
10.	"Summer Nights"	Delvaux; Emily Philips; Anthony Whiting	Cooper	3:54
11.	"Pain"	Delvaux; Dumoulin	Gustin	4:26
12.	"We Had"	Delvaux; Gustin; Jan Maarschalk Lemmens; Joe Hammil; PJ	Gustin	4:02
13.	"Stubborn"	Delvaux; Gustin; Matthew Alcin	Gustin	3:39
Total length:				46:00

== Charts ==
Chart (2020)	Peak position
Belgian Albums (Ultratop Flanders)	22
Belgian Albums (Ultratop Wallonia)	7

== Release history ==
Region	Date	Format	Label
Various	29 May 2020	Digital download; streaming	PIAS Belgium
