= Higher (Laura Tesoro song) =

Single by Laura Tesoro
- Released: 28 April 2017
- Recorded: 2016
- Genre: Pop
- Length: 3:28
- Label: Sony Music Entertainment Belgium
- Songwriter(s): Laura Tesoro; Wouter Vander Veken
- Producer(s): Kyle Kelso

Laura Tesoro singles chronology
"What's the Pressure" (2016)	"Higher" (2017)	"Beast" (2017)

"Higher" is song performed by Belgian singer Laura Tesoro. The song was released as a digital download on 28 April 2017 by Sony Music Entertainment Belgium. The song peaked at number 21 in Belgium. The song was written by Laura Tesoro, Wouter Vander Veken and produced by Kyle Kelso.

== Track listing ==
Digital download
No.	Title	Length
1.	"Higher"	3:28

== Charts ==
=== Weekly charts ===
Chart (2017)	Peak position
Belgium (Ultratop 50 Flanders)	20

=== Year-end charts ===
Chart (2017)	Position
Belgium (Ultratop Flanders)	51

== Release history ==
Region	Date	Format	Label
Belgium	28 April 2017	Digital download	Sony Music Entertainment Belgium
