= Soon (Blanche song) =

Single by Blanche

from the album Empire
- Released: 20 July 2018
- Recorded: 2018
- Length: 3:22
- Label: PIAS Belgium
- Songwriter(s): Ellie Delvaux; Toma Médard
- Producer(s): François Gustin

Blanche singles chronology
"Wrong Turn" (2018)	"Soon" (2018)	"Moment" (2018)

Music video
- "Soon" on YouTube

"Soon" is a song by Belgian singer and songwriter Blanche. It was released as a digital download on 20 July 2018 by PIAS Belgium and it was later included in her debut studio album Empire. The song was written by Ellie Delvaux and Toma Médard.

== Charts ==
Chart (2018)	Peak position
Belgium (Ultratip Bubbling Under Wallonia)	32

== Release history ==
Region	Date	Format	Label
Belgium	20 July 2018	Digital download; streaming	PIAS Belgium
