= What's the Pressure =

2016 single by Laura Tesoro

Single by Laura Tesoro
- Released: 17 January 2016
- Recorded: 2015
- Genre: Pop; dance-pop; post-disco
- Length: 2:59; 2:52 (Revamped version)
- Label: VRT Line Extensions
- Songwriter(s): Sanne Putseys; Louis Favre; Birsen Uçar

Laura Tesoro singles chronology
"Funky Love" (2015)	"What's the Pressure" (2016)	"Higher" (2017)

Eurovision Song Contest 2016 entry
- Country: Belgium
- Artist(s): Laura Tesoro
- Language: English
- Composer(s): Sanne Putseys, Louis Favre, Birsen Uçar
- Lyricist(s): Sanne Putseys, Louis Favre, Birsen Uçar

Finals performance
- Semi-final result: 3rd
- Semi-final points: 274
- Final result: 10th
- Final points: 181

Entry chronology
- ◄ "Rhythm Inside" (2015)
- "City Lights" (2017) ►

"What's the Pressure" is a song performed by Belgian singer Laura Tesoro. The song represented Belgium in the Eurovision Song Contest 2016. The song was released as a digital download in Belgium on 17 January 2016 through VRT Line Extensions. It was ultimately placed tenth in the aforementioned competition with 181 points from the forty two voting nations.

== Eurovision Song Contest ==
In November 2015, Tesoro was announced as one of the five participants of Eurosong 2016. In the first show, she covered the song "Düm Tek Tek" by Hadise, which represented Turkey in the Eurovision Song Contest 2009. In the second show she revealed her Eurovision candidate song and received the highest televoting score. In the final on 17 January 2016, she was declared the winner after placing first with both the Belgian public and international juries. Tesoro performed in position 1 with the song in the Eurovision Song Contest 2016, in Stockholm and finished tenth with 181 points; six positions lower than the previous Belgian representative, Loïc Nottet.

== Track listing ==
Digital download
No.	Title	Length
1.	"What's the Pressure" (Eurosong 2016)	2:59

== Charts ==
=== Weekly charts ===
Chart (2016)	Peak position
Austria (Ö3 Austria Top 40)	75
Belgium (Ultratop 50 Flanders)	2
Belgium (Ultratip Bubbling Under Wallonia)	15
France (SNEP)	103
Netherlands (Single Tip)	1
Sweden (Sverigetopplistan)	82

=== Year-end charts ===
Chart (2016)	Position
Belgium (Ultratop Flanders)	28

== Certifications ==
Region	Certification	Certified units/sales
Belgium (BRMA)	Gold	10,000^{‡}
^{‡} Sales+streaming figures based on certification alone.

== Release history ==
Region	Date	Format	Label
Belgium	17 January 2016	Digital download	VRT Line Extensions
