= Wrong Turn (song) =

Single by Blanche
- Released: 25 May 2018
- Recorded: 2018
- Genre: Electropop Contemporary R&B
- Length: 3:23
- Label: PIAS Belgium
- Songwriter(s): Ellie Delvaux; Pierre Dumoulin; Andras Vleminckx
- Producer(s): Pat Wimberly

Blanche singles chronology
"City Lights" (2017)	"Wrong Turn" (2018)	"Soon" (2018)

Music video
- "Wrong Turn" on YouTube

"Wrong Turn" is a song by Belgian singer and songwriter Blanche. It was released as a digital download on 25 May 2018 by PIAS Belgium. The song was written by Ellie Delvaux, Pierre Dumoulin and Andras Vleminckx.

== Background ==
"Wrong Turn" has been described as a "smooth mid-tempo electro-pop song" that describes how sometimes one needs to find the right direction in life. The music video was released on 19 June 2019 and was directed by Nur Casadevall Castello and produced by CANADA & Blink.

== Charts ==
Chart (2018)	Peak position
Belgium (Ultratip Bubbling Under Wallonia)	25

== Release history ==
Region	Date	Format	Label
Belgium	25 May 2018	Digital download; streaming	PIAS Belgium
