= Ketnetpop =

Ketnetpop is a series of pop concerts organized and performed by former candidates from the Belgian preselections of the Junior Eurovision Song Contest. The first edition which consisted of three concerts took place in April 2008; a second edition was held in April 2009, and a third edition in April 2010.

All concerts were performed in the Zuiderkroon in Antwerp. The Flanders children's television station Ketnet broadcasts both the preparations and the eventual concert.

The first concerts in April 2008 were such a success, that an extra concert was given in addition to the three planned ones on June 29, 2008.

== Sources ==
- "Elf ex-Junior Eurosong-finalisten organiseren samen popconcert in KetnetPOP". The Top of Music. 2008-02-05. Archived from the original on 2011-10-06.
