= Funky Love (Laura Tesoro song) =

Single by Laura Tesoro
- Released: 25 February 2015
- Recorded: 2014
- Genre: Pop
- Length: 3:00
- Label: Tomusic
- Songwriter(s): Tom Lodewyckx; Steven Vergauwen; Laura Tesoro
- Producer(s): Tom Lodewyckx

Laura Tesoro singles chronology
| "Outta Here" (2014) | "Funky Love" (2015) | "What's the Pressure" (2016) |

"Funky Love" is a song by Belgian singer and actress Laura Tesoro. It was released as a digital download in Belgium on 25 February 2015 through Tomusic Records. The song has charted in Belgium, and was written by Tom Lodewyckx, Steven Vergauwen and Tesoro.

== Track listing ==
Digital download
| No. | Title | Length |
|---|---|---|
| 1. | "Funky Love" | 3:00 |

== Charts ==
| Chart (2015) | Peak position |
|---|---|
| Belgium (Ultratip Bubbling Under Flanders) | 27 |

== Release history ==
| Region | Date | Format | Label |
|---|---|---|---|
| Belgium | 25 February 2015 | Digital download | Tomusic |
