= City Lights (Blanche song) =

2017 song by Blanche

Single by Blanche
- Released: 8 March 2017
- Length: 2:54
- Label: PIAS Belgium
- Songwriter(s): Pierre Dumoulin; Blanche

Blanche singles chronology
"City Lights" (2017)	"Wrong Turn" (2018)

Music video
- "City Lights" on YouTube

Eurovision Song Contest 2017 entry
- Country: Belgium
- Artist(s): Blanche
- Language: English
- Composer(s): Pierre Dumoulin
- Lyricist(s): Pierre Dumoulin; Blanche

Finals performance
- Semi-final result: 4th
- Semi-final points: 165
- Final result: 4th
- Final points: 363

Entry chronology
- ◄ "What's the Pressure" (2016)
- "A Matter of Time" (2018) ►

"City Lights" is a song performed by Belgian singer Blanche. The song represented Belgium in the Eurovision Song Contest 2017, and it finished in 4th place in the grand final on 13 May 2017. The song was intended to be released as a digital download on 8 March 2017 through PIAS Belgium, but leaked through Spotify the night before.

== Release ==
While Blanche's song "City Lights" had been previously announced to be released on 8 March 2017, the song leaked the night before through Spotify. It was released as a digital download on 8 March.

== Eurovision Song Contest ==
On 22 November 2016, it was announced that Blanche would be representing Belgium at the Eurovision Song Contest 2017. Belgium competed at the Eurovision Song Contest's first half of the first semi-final that took place on 9 May 2017, and finished 4th, gaining enough points to compete in the final. Belgium ended up with 363 points on 4th place in the Grand Final, receiving 12 points from Ireland's jury and the televote in Estonia, Poland, Latvia and Sweden.

== Charts ==
=== Weekly charts ===
Chart (2017)	Peak position
Austria (Ö3 Austria Top 40)	14
Belgium (Ultratop 50 Flanders)	1
Belgium (Ultratop 50 Wallonia)	2
Euro Digital Songs (Billboard)	15
Finland Download (Latauslista)	10
France (SNEP)	35
Germany (GfK)	38
Hungary (Single Top 40)	12
Iceland (RÚV)	3
Netherlands (Single Top 100)	39
Poland (Polish Airplay Top 100)	23
Portugal (AFP)	49
Scotland (OCC)	38
Spain (PROMUSICAE)	21
Sweden (Sverigetopplistan)	18
Switzerland (Schweizer Hitparade)	24
UK Singles Downloads (OCC)	36

=== Year-end charts ===
Chart (2017)	Position
Belgium (Ultratop Flanders)	6
Belgium (Ultratop Wallonia)	20

== Certifications ==
Region	Certification	Certified units/sales
Belgium (BRMA)	2× Platinum	40,000^{‡}
^{‡} Sales+streaming figures based on certification alone.

== Release history ==
Region	Date	Format	Label
Various	8 March 2017	Digital download	PIAS Belgium
