= Portugal in the Eurovision Song Contest 2022 =

- Eurovision Song Contest 2022
- Participating broadcaster: Rádio e Televisão de Portugal (RTP)
- Country: Portugal
- Selection process: Festival da Canção 2022
- Selection date: 12 March 2022

Competing entry
- Song: "Saudade, saudade"
- Artist: Maro
- Songwriters: Maro; John Blanda

Placement
- Semi-final result: Qualified (4th, 208 points)
- Final result: 9th, 207 points

Participation chronology

Portugal was represented at the Eurovision Song Contest 2022 with the song "Saudade, saudade" performed by Maro. The Portuguese participating broadcaster, Rádio e Televisão de Portugal (RTP), organised the national final Festival da Canção 2022 in order to select its entry for the contest. After two semi-finals and a final which took place in March 2022, "Saudade, saudade" performed by Maro emerged as the winner after achieving the highest score following the combination of votes from seven regional juries and a public televote.

Portugal was drawn to compete in the first semi-final of the Eurovision Song Contest which took place on 10 May 2022. Performing during the show in position 10, "Saudade, saudade" was announced among the top 10 entries of the first semi-final and therefore qualified to compete in the final on 14 May. It was later revealed that Portugal placed fourth out of the 17 participating countries in the semi-final with 208 points. In the final, Portugal performed in position 3 and placed ninth out of the 25 participating countries with 207 points.

== Background ==
Prior to the 2022 contest, Radiotelevisão Portuguesa (RTP) until 2003, and Rádio e Televisão de Portugal (RTP) since 2004, had participated in the Eurovision Song Contest representing Portugal fifty-two times since their first entry in 1964. Portugal had won the contest on one occasion: in 2017 with the song "Amar pelos dois" performed by Salvador Sobral. Following the introduction of semi-finals for the 2004, Portugal had featured in only six finals. Portugal's least successful result has been last place, which they have achieved on four occasions, most recently in 2018 with the song "O jardim" performed by Cláudia Pascoal. Portugal has also received nul points on two occasions; in 1964 and 1997. The nation qualified to the final in 2021 and placed twelfth with the song "Love Is on My Side" performed by the Black Mamba.

As part of its duties as participating broadcaster, RTP organises the selection of its entry in the Eurovision Song Contest and broadcasts the event in the country. The broadcaster confirmed its participation in the 2022 contest on 8 September 2021. RTP has traditionally selected its entry for the contest via the music competition Festival da Canção, with exceptions in 1988 and in 2005 when the entries were internally selected. Along with its participation confirmation, RTP revealed details regarding its selection procedure and announced the organization of Festival da Canção 2022 in order to select its 2022 entry.

== Before Eurovision ==
=== Festival da Canção 2022 ===
The official logotype of Festival da Canção 2022.

Festival da Canção 2022 was the 56th edition of Festival da Canção that selected Portugal's entry for the Eurovision Song Contest 2022. Twenty entries competed in the competition that consisted of two semi-finals held on 5 and 7 March 2022 leading to a ten-song final on 12 March 2022. All three shows of the competition took place at RTP's Studio 1 in Lisbon and were broadcast on RTP1 and RTP Internacional as well as on radio via Antena 1 and online via RTP Play. The shows were also broadcast on RTP Acessibilidades with presentation in Portuguese Sign Language and in Spain on Ten and tvG2, the latter with Galician commentary by Moncho Lemos and Xosé Manuel Martín, as well as online via RTVE Play.

==== Format ====
The format of the competition consisted of three shows: two semi-finals on 5 and 7 March 2022 and the final on 12 March 2022. Each semi-final featured ten competing entries from which five advanced from each show to complete the ten song lineup in the final. Results during the semi-finals were determined by the 50/50 combination of votes from a jury panel appointed by RTP and public televoting, while results during the final were determined by the 50/50 combination of votes from seven regional juries and public televoting, which was opened following the second semi-final and closed during the final show. Both the public televote and the juries assigned points from 1–8, 10 and 12 based on the ranking developed by both streams of voting.

==== Competing entries ====
Twenty composers were selected by RTP through two methods: sixteen invited by RTP for the competition and four selected from over 600 submissions received through an open call for songs. The composers, which both created the songs and selected its performers, were required to submit the demo and final versions of their entries by 31 October and 30 November 2021, respectively. Songs could be submitted in any language. The selected composers were revealed on 4 November 2021, while the competing artists and songs were revealed on 21 January 2022.

Artist	Song	Songwriter(s)	Selection
Aurea	"Why?"	Aurea, Rui Massena	Invited by RTP
Os Azeitonas	"Solta a voz e canta"	Os Azeitonas, Mário Brandão, João Salcedo	Invited by RTP
Blacci	"Mar no fim"	Blacci, Edu Monteiro, Hits Mike, Liam Cole, Gonzalo, Iolanda, Stego	Invited by RTP
Cubita	"Uma mensagem tua"	Cubita, Scardini	Invited by RTP
Diana Castro	"Ginger Ale"	Joana Espadinha	Invited by RTP
Fado Bicha	"Povo pequenino"	Fado Bicha, João Caçador, Lila Tiago	Invited by RTP
FF	"Como é bom esperar alguém"	FF	Invited by RTP
Inês Homem de Melo	"Fome de viagem"	Pedro Marques, Galileu Granito	Open call winner
Jonas	"Pontas soltas"	Fábia Rebordão	Invited by RTP
Kumpania Algazarra	"A minha praia"	Kumpania Algazarra, Luís Barrocas, Francisco Amorim	Invited by RTP
Maro	"Saudade, saudade"	Maro, John Blanda	Invited by RTP
Milhanas	"Corpo de mulher"	Agir	Invited by RTP
Norton	"Hope"	Norton	Invited by RTP
Pepperoni Passion	"Código 30"	Pepperoni Passion, António Santos, Pedro Ferreira, João Reis	Open call winner
Pongo and Tristany	"Dégrá.dê"	DJ Marfox, Pongo, Tristany	Invited by RTP
Os Quatro e Meia	"Amanhã"	Tiago Nogueira	Open call winner
Syro	"Ainda nos temos"	Syro, Ariel, Gonzalo Tau	Invited by RTP
TheMisterDriver	"Calisun"	TheMisterDriver	Open call winner
Valas and Os Astronautas	"Odisseia"	Valas, Os Astronautas	Invited by RTP
O Vampiro Submarino	"Ao lado de mim"	PZ	Invited by RTP

==== Semi-finals ====
The two semi-finals took place on 5 and 7 March 2022. The first semi-final was hosted by Jorge Gabriel and Sónia Araújo while the second semi-final was hosted by Tânia Ribas de Oliveira and José Carlos Malato. In each semi-final ten entries competed and five advanced to the final based on the 50/50 combination of votes of a jury panel consisting of Dulce Pontes, Dino D'Santiago, Surma, Teresa Salgueiro, Pedro Granger, Miguel Cadete and Tatanka, and a public televote. In addition to the performances of the competing entries, Rita Redshoes, Expensive Soul, Rui Pregal da Cunha and Portuguese Eurovision 2021 entrant The Black Mamba performed as guests in the first semi-final, while The Legendary Tigerman, Samuel Úria, Capitão Fausto, Lena d'Água, Portuguese Eurovision 1980 and 1998 entrant José Cid, and Spanish Eurovision 2022 entrant Chanel performed as guests in the second semi-final.

Semi-final 1 – 5 March 2022
R/O	Artist	Song	Jury	Televote	Total	Place
1	Os Quatro e Meia	"Amanhã"	6	12	18	2
2	TheMisterDriver	"Calisun"	1	1	2	10
3	Diana Castro	"Ginger Ale"	10	4	14	4
4	FF	"Como é bom esperar alguém"	8	8	16	3
5	Norton	"Hope"	2	5	7	7
6	Aurea	"Why?"	7	7	14	5
7	Kumpania Algazarra	"A minha praia"	3	2	5	9
8	Maro	"Saudade, saudade"	12	10	22	1
9	Valas and Os Astronautas	"Odisseia"	4	3	7	8
10	Fado Bicha	"Povo pequenino"	5	6	11	6

Semi-final 2 – 7 March 2022
R/O	Artist	Song	Jury	Televote	Total	Place
1	Os Azeitonas	"Solta a voz e canta"	5	4	9	7
2	Cubita	"Uma mensagem tua"	1	1	2	10
3	Inês Homem de Melo	"Fome de viagem"	7	12	19	2
4	Syro	"Ainda nos temos"	4	10	14	4
5	Pepperoni Passion	"Código 30"	8	5	13	5
6	Milhanas	"Corpo de mulher"	12	8	20	1
7	O Vampiro Submarino	"Ao lado de mim"	2	2	4	9
8	Jonas	"Pontas soltas"	6	7	13	6
9	Blacci	"Mar no fim"	3	3	6	8
10	Pongo and Tristany	"Dégrá.dê"	10	6	16	3

==== Final ====
The final took place 12 March 2022, hosted by Filomena Cautela and Vasco Palmeirim. The ten entries that qualified from the two preceding semi-finals competed and the winner, "Saudade, saudade" performed by Maro, was selected based on the 50/50 combination of votes of seven regional juries and a public televote. In addition to the performances of the competing entries, Bateu Matou, Blaya, Lura, Sara Correia, and B Fachada together with Benjamim, Selma Uamusse and Tiago Bettencourt performed as the interval acts.

Final – 12 March 2022
R/O	Artist	Song	Jury	Televote	Total	Place
1	Pongo and Tristany	"Dégrá.dê"	7	3	10	6
2	Syro	"Ainda nos temos"	3	6	9	9
3	Milhanas	"Corpo de mulher"	8	2	10	7
4	Inês Homem de Melo	"Fome de viagem"	2	7	9	8
5	Aurea	"Why?"	6	5	11	5
6	Os Quatro e Meia	"Amanhã"	4	10	14	2
7	FF	"Como é bom esperar alguém"	6	8	14	3
8	Diana Castro	"Ginger Ale"	10	4	14	4
9	Maro	"Saudade, saudade"	12	12	24	1
10	Pepperoni Passion	"Código 30"	1	1	2	10

Detailed regional jury votes
R/O	Song	North	Central	Lisbon Area	Alentejo	Algarve	Madeira	Azores	Total	Points
1	"Dégrá.dê"	8	7	8	4	4	1	10	42	7
2	"Ainda nos temos"	2	4	6	3	8	3	1	27	3
3	"Corpo de mulher"	5	10	7	8	7	10	5	52	8
4	"Fome de viagem"	3	1	4	7	1	4	4	24	2
5	"Why?"	7	6	2	6	12	5	2	40	6
6	"Amanhã"	10	3	5	2	6	7	3	36	4
7	"Como é bom esperar alguém"	4	8	1	12	3	6	6	40	6
8	"Ginger Ale"	6	5	12	10	5	8	7	53	10
9	"Saudade, saudade"	12	12	10	5	10	12	12	73	12
10	"Código 30"	1	2	3	1	2	2	8	19	1
Members of the jury
North: Joana Brandão, André Tentugal, Jorge Romão; Central: Gomo, mema., Jacinta; Lisbon Area: Mariana Norton, Joana Alegre, Miguel Ângelo; Alentejo: Duarte, Paulo Ribeiro, Jéssica Pina; Algarve: Diana Silveira, Paulo Silva, Pete Tha Zouk; Madeira: Tiago Sena Silva, Catarina Faria, Elisa Silva; Azores: Eugénia Contente, Herberto Quaresma, Romeu Bairos

==== Ratings ====
Viewing figures by show
Show	Date	Viewing figures		Ref.
Show	Date	Nominal	Share	Ref.
Semi-final 1	5 March 2022	548,000	12.7%	
Semi-final 2	7 March 2022	409,000	9.6%	
Final	12 March 2022	638,000	16.0%	

== At Eurovision ==
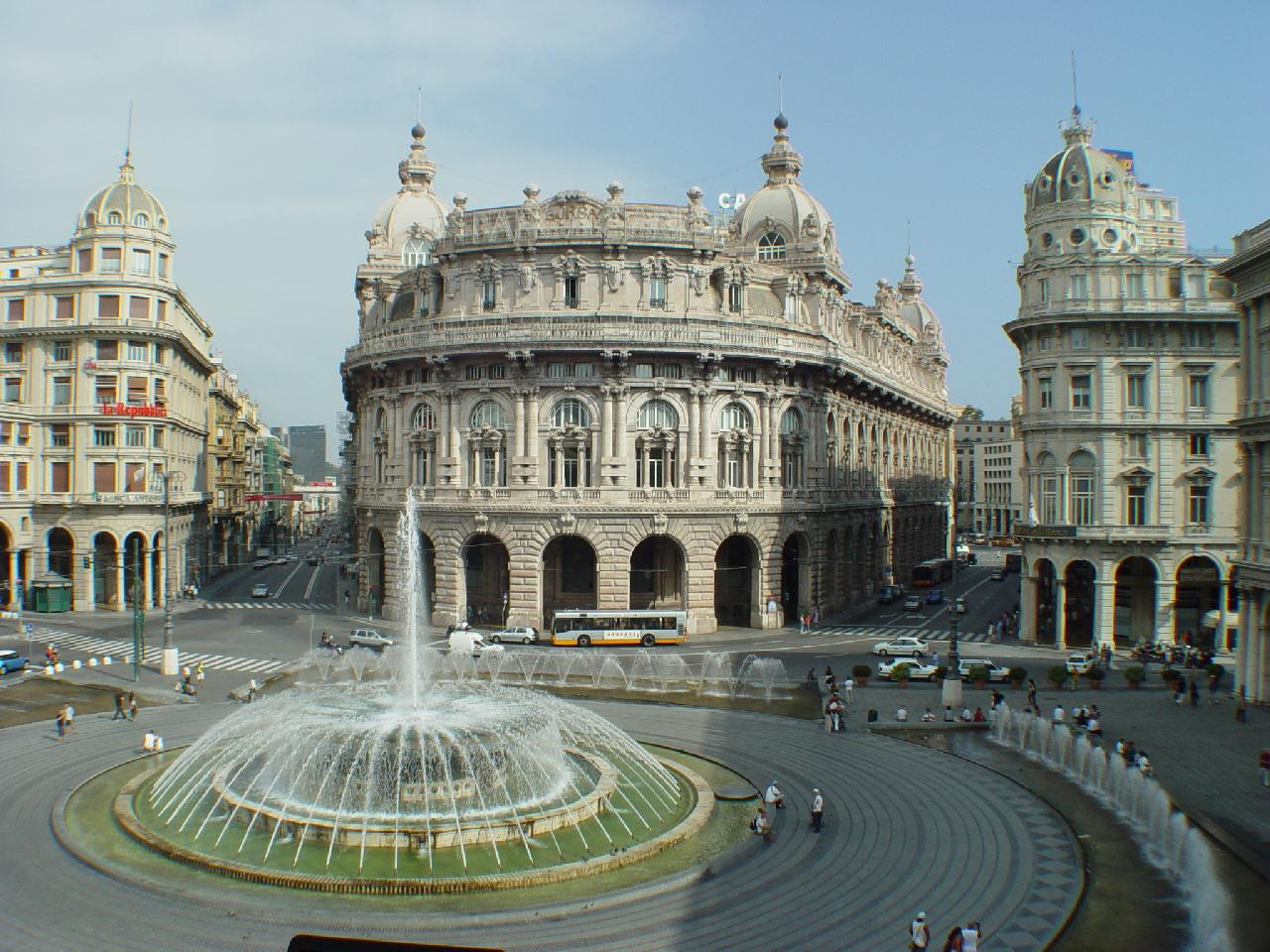
A video postcard introduced Maro's performance in the first semi-final and final of the Eurovision Song Contest 2022. The postcard was filmed in the Italian city of Genoa and featured virtual projections of Maro across the location.

According to Eurovision rules, all nations with the exceptions of the host country and the "Big Five" (France, Germany, Italy, Spain and the United Kingdom) are required to qualify from one of two semi-finals in order to compete for the final; the top ten countries from each semi-final progress to the final. The European Broadcasting Union (EBU) split up the competing countries into six different pots based on voting patterns from previous contests, with countries with favourable voting histories put into the same pot. On 25 January 2022, an allocation draw was held which placed each country into one of the two semi-finals, as well as which half of the show they would perform in. Portugal was placed into the first semi-final, which was held on 10 May 2022, and was scheduled to perform in the second half of the show.

Once all the competing songs for the 2022 contest had been released, the running order for the semi-finals was decided by the shows' producers rather than through another draw, so that similar songs were not placed next to each other. Portugal was set to perform in position 10, following the entry from the Moldova and before the entry from Croatia. Immediately after the close of the first semi-final, a press conference was held in which each of the artists drew the half of the final of which they would perform in. Portugal was drawn into the first half of the final and was later selected by the EBU to perform in position number 3, following the entry from Romania and before the entry from Finland.

In Portugal, all shows were broadcast on RTP1, RTP Internacional and RTP África, with commentary by Nuno Galopim. The Portuguese spokesperson, who announced the top 12-point score awarded by the Portuguese jury during the final, was Pedro Tatanka, who previously represented Portugal in the Eurovision Song Contest 2021 as part of The Black Mamba.

=== Semi-final ===
Maro took part in technical rehearsals on 1 and 5 May, followed by dress rehearsals on 9 and 10 May. This included the jury show on 9 May where the professional juries of each country watched and voted on the competing entries.

The Portuguese performance featured Maro and five backing singers encircled around a smoke-floored stage with intricate patterns in the background. The five backing vocalists were Diana Castro, Milhanas, Carolina Leite, Beatriz Fonseca and Beatriz Pessoa.

At the end of the show, Portugal was announced as having finished in the top 10 and subsequently qualifying for the grand final. This marked the second consecutive qualification to the final for Portugal. It was later revealed that Maro placed fourth in the semi-final, receiving a total of 208 points: 87 points from the televoting and 121 points from the juries.

=== Final ===
Shortly after the first semi-final, a winners' press conference was held for the ten qualifying countries. As part of this press conference, the qualifying artists took part in a draw to determine which half of the grand final they would subsequently participate in. This draw was done in the order the countries appeared in the semi-final running order. Portugal was drawn to compete in the first half. Following this draw, the shows' producers decided upon the running order of the final, as they had done for the semi-finals. Portugal was subsequently placed to perform in position 3, following the entry from Romania and before the entry from Finland.

Maro once again took part in dress rehearsals on 13 and 14 May before the final, including the jury final where the professional juries cast their final votes before the live show. She performed a repeat of her semi-final performance during the final on 14 May. Portugal placed ninth in the final, scoring 207 points: 36 points from the televoting and 171 points from the juries.

=== Voting ===
Below is a breakdown of points awarded to Portugal during the first semi-final and final. Voting during the three shows involved each country awarding two sets of points from 1-8, 10 and 12: one from their professional jury and the other from televoting. The exact composition of the professional jury, and the results of each country's jury and televoting were released after the final; the individual results from each jury member were also released in an anonymised form. The Portuguese jury consisted of Cláudia Pascoal, who represented Portugal in the Eurovision Song Contest 2018, Joana Espadinha, Paulo Castelo, Pedro Granger, and Rita Guerra, who represented Portugal in the Eurovision Song Contest 2003. In the first semi-final, Portugal finished in fourth place out of seventeen entries, marking Portugal's second consecutive qualification to the grand final. The first semi-final of the contest saw Portugal receive twelve points from Croatia (jury) and Switzerland (televoting). Over the course of the contest, Portugal awarded its 12 points to Latvia (jury) and Ukraine (televote) in the first semi-final and Spain (jury) and Ukraine (televote) in the final.

==== Points awarded to Portugal ====
Points awarded to Portugal (Semi-final 1)
Score	Televote	Jury
12 points	Switzerland	Croatia
10 points		Armenia; Austria; Netherlands; Norway
8 points	Armenia; France; Lithuania	Denmark; Ukraine
7 points		Lithuania
6 points	Bulgaria; Italy; Latvia; Netherlands	France; Iceland; Slovenia
5 points	Albania	Bulgaria; Greece; Latvia; Moldova
4 points	Moldova; Ukraine	Albania; Switzerland
3 points	Denmark; Greece	
2 points	Iceland; Norway; Slovenia	
1 point	Austria; Croatia	

Points awarded to Portugal (Final)
Score	Televote	Jury
12 points		
10 points		Austria; Croatia; Norway; Ukraine
8 points		Armenia; Denmark; Lithuania; Netherlands
7 points	Lithuania; Switzerland	Azerbaijan; Estonia; Georgia; Poland; Romania; Serbia
6 points	France	Australia; Latvia
5 points	Montenegro	Belgium; Czech Republic; Iceland; Switzerland
4 points	Armenia; Spain	Bulgaria; Ireland; Montenegro
3 points		Greece; Slovenia; United Kingdom
2 points		Moldova
1 points	Belgium; Italy; Poland	Albania; France

==== Points awarded by Portugal ====
Points awarded by Portugal (Semi-final 1)
Score	Televote	Jury
12 points	Ukraine	Latvia
10 points	Moldova	Iceland
8 points	Netherlands	Netherlands
7 points	Norway	Ukraine
6 points	Lithuania	Lithuania
5 points	Armenia	Greece
4 points	Greece	Switzerland
3 points	Denmark	Armenia
2 points	Iceland	Norway
1 point	Croatia	Moldova

Points awarded by Portugal (Final)
Score	Televote	Jury
12 points	Ukraine	Spain
10 points	Spain	United Kingdom
8 points	Moldova	Ukraine
7 points	Sweden	Netherlands
6 points	United Kingdom	Iceland
5 points	Serbia	Lithuania
4 points	Netherlands	Greece
3 points	Italy	Serbia
2 points	Norway	Switzerland
1 point	Lithuania	Armenia

==== Detailed voting results ====
The following members comprised the Portuguese jury:

- Cláudia Pascoal - Singer-songwriter, represented Portugal in the Eurovision Song Contest 2018
- Joana Espadinha - Singer-songwriter
- Paulo Castelo – Lyricist, songwriter, music producer
- Pedro Granger – Actor
- Rita Guerra – singer, represented Portugal in the Eurovision Song Contest 2003

Detailed voting results from Portugal (Semi-final 1)
R/O	Country	Jury							Televote	
R/O	Country	Juror 1	Juror 2	Juror 3	Juror 4	Juror 5	Rank	Points	Rank	Points
01	Albania	16	16	16	12	12	16		14	
02	Latvia	3	1	2	5	1	1	12	12	
03	Lithuania	4	10	12	2	2	5	6	5	6
04	Switzerland	8	2	8	14	6	7	4	11	
05	Slovenia	9	15	9	13	15	14		13	
06	Ukraine	12	3	1	8	5	4	7	1	12
07	Bulgaria	11	13	13	16	16	15		16	
08	Netherlands	2	6	5	4	7	3	8	3	8
09	Moldova	14	4	14	15	8	10	1	2	10
10	Portugal									
11	Croatia	10	11	7	10	14	13		10	1
12	Denmark	6	14	11	9	11	12		8	3
13	Austria	15	12	15	3	13	11		15	
14	Iceland	1	5	10	1	3	2	10	9	2
15	Greece	5	9	3	6	4	6	5	7	4
16	Norway	13	8	4	11	10	9	2	4	7
17	Armenia	7	7	6	7	9	8	3	6	5

Detailed voting results from Portugal (Final)
R/O	Country	Jury							Televote	
R/O	Country	Juror 1	Juror 2	Juror 3	Juror 4	Juror 5	Rank	Points	Rank	Points
01	Czech Republic	17	7	16	19	11	16		22	
02	Romania	24	19	23	17	13	23		13	
03	Portugal									
04	Finland	23	22	20	12	21	24		16	
05	Switzerland	9	23	10	3	12	9	2	17	
06	France	18	16	11	23	16	19		19	
07	Norway	16	18	19	9	4	13		9	2
08	Armenia	8	6	13	7	15	10	1	15	
09	Italy	15	8	21	20	8	15		8	3
10	Spain	6	1	2	4	2	1	12	2	10
11	Netherlands	1	3	8	10	7	4	7	7	4
12	Ukraine	12	12	6	1	1	3	8	1	12
13	Germany	22	10	24	18	24	21		14	
14	Lithuania	4	4	1	16	14	6	5	10	1
15	Azerbaijan	7	11	9	21	19	14		24	
16	Belgium	11	21	12	22	22	18		20	
17	Greece	5	14	7	8	5	7	4	18	
18	Iceland	3	2	5	6	20	5	6	23	
19	Moldova	20	17	14	2	17	11		3	8
20	Sweden	10	5	15	15	9	12		4	7
21	Australia	21	15	22	13	23	22		21	
22	United Kingdom	2	13	3	5	3	2	10	5	6
23	Poland	19	24	17	11	10	17		11	
24	Serbia	13	9	4	24	6	8	3	6	5
25	Estonia	14	20	18	14	18	20		12	
