= Avante EP - Ao Vivo em São Paulo =

Avante EP (Ao Vivo em São Paulo)
- Cover of the third EP Joelma and the first EP live on his solo career.

EP by Joelma
- Released: April 14, 2017
- Recorded: November 9, 2016, "Coração Sertanejo", São Paulo
- Genre: Brega Pop; Calypso
- Length: 13:13
- Label: Universal Music Group
- Producer: Joelma; Tovinho; Digital Download

Joelma chronology
Assunto Delicado (2016)	Avante EP (Ao Vivo em São Paulo) (2017)	Avante (2017)

Avante (Ao Vivo Em São Paulo) EP (English: Forward EP (Live In São Paulo) ) is an extended play (EP) of Brazilian singer Joelma released in order to support the release of Album of the same name. It was released on all digital platforms on April 14, 2017 by Universal Music. Voando pro Pará, 'Não Teve Amor, Chora Não Coração and #Partiu were the songs released.

In less than 24 hours, the EP was already in first place on iTunes.

== Videos ==
The videos of the four songs were made available on the singer's official channel on YouTube the same day.

== Track listing ==
No.	Title	Writer(s)	Length
1.	"#Partiu"	Zel Moreira; Cecilio Nena	3:13
2.	"Voando Pro Pará"	Valter Serraria; Nilk Oliveira; Chrystian Lima; Isac Maraial	3:23
3.	"Não Teve Amor"	Marília Mendonça; Juliano Tchula; Rangel Castro	3:11
4.	"Chora Não Coração"	Marcibrom	3:25
Total length:			13:13
