= Joelma =

Joelma may refer to:

- Joelma (singer) (born 1974), Brazilian singer, former vocalist of the duo Banda Calypso
  - Joelma (EP), 2016
  - Joelma (album), 2016
- Joelma Sousa (born 1984), Brazilian sprinter
- Joelma Viegas (born 1986), Angolan handball player
- Joelma Building, a skyscraper in São Paulo, Brazil, notable for a 1974 fire that killed 179 people
