= Ai coração (Joelma song) =

"Ai Coração"

Single by Joelma

from the album Joelma
- Language: Portuguese
- English title: "Woe Heart"
- Released: January 21, 2016
- Recorded: 2016
- Genre: Calipso; Forró
- Length: 3:28
- Label: Universal Music Group
- Songwriters: Louro Santos; Waldecy Moreno

Joelma singles chronology
"Voando Pro Pará" (2016)	"Ai Coração" (2016)	"Não Teve Amor" (2016)

"Ai Coração" ("Woe Heart") is a song released by the singer Joelma, present in their first album Joelma. It was released as the second single album and composed of Louro Santos and Waldecy Moreno.

== Release and disclosure ==
The song was released on January 21, 2016 for listening and download on the social networks of the singer, who also used the stage name "Joelma Calypso". During the release, fans of the singer joined Twitter to promote and release the song. On the Internet was the 8th most talked about Tag in the world and the 5th in Brazil and in less than 24 Hours more than 1 Million people downloaded and listened to the song. Already on Youtube to music has surpassed the barrier of more than 1 Million Views with clip lyrics also in less than 24 hours. In an interview for radio FM O Dia, Joelma said that the song originally would be the first official single from her solo career. "Ai Coração" and "Não Teve Amor" were sent together to the radio stations and the radioistas would decide which to play and "Não Teve Amor" was always the most requested of the public. The version that was made available for download differs from the album version only by the label "Joelma Calypso" that was included in the first recordings.

== Plagiarism accusation ==
The song was charged with plagiarism. Composed by Louro Santos, who confirmed to have given it to Joelma, the song was recorded by the singer Jade in December of the previous year, in album with production of Ximbinha, which revolted the fans . Through the press office, Jade complained about the repercussion: "It is an honor that talented and great singer Joelma also recorded a composition by Louro Santos, which is already part of the repertoire of singer Jade's album since July 2015, as explained. However, some fans of Joelma (a minority, it is emphasized) are distilling, in the social networks, hatred against Jade, the producer [Ximbinha] and its team, in social networks. You can not modify your playlist, which is already recorded."
