= Avante (album) =

Avante (Ao Vivo em São Paulo)

Live album by Joelma
- Released: April 28, 2017
- Recorded: November 9, 2016
- Venues: "Coração Sertanejo", São Paulo
- Genres: Calipso; cumbia; carimbó; lambada; Latin pop; salsa; tecnobrega; zouk
- Length: 122 minutes
- Label: Universal
- Directors: Pedro Mota; Anselmo Troncoso
- Producer: Tovinho

Joelma chronology
Assunto Delicado (2016)	Avante (Ao Vivo em São Paulo) (2017)

Singles from Avante
- 1. "Amor Novo" Released: January 13, 2017; 2. "Chora Não Coração" Released: April 27, 2017

Avante (Ao Vivo Em São Paulo) (English: "Forwards (Live in São Paulo") is the first live material by Brazilian singer Joelma, being the second CD in her solo career and the singer's first DVD, released on April 28, 2017 by Universal Music.

== Background ==
During 2016, Joelma said in interviews that she would record her first DVD at the end of the year. In doubt about whether to record in São Paulo or Rio de Janeiro, the singer even considered the idea of recording a "Joelma By Brazil" project (alluding to the DVD Banda Calypso Pelo Brasil, recorded in 5 Brazilian capitals in 2006).

Joelma announced on August 23, 2016 that the recording would take place on November 9 at the concert house Coração Sertanejo in São Paulo. "The wait is over, in November we have a meeting scheduled for the recording of my DVD!" she wrote on her social media.

Despite criticism over the choice of the small venue and the day of the recording being on a Wednesday, the 2,000 tickets made available for the recording were sold in a week, two months before the show.

The fan club meeting was the reason for choosing São Paulo as the location. The director of the show, Anselmo Troncoso, has also worked with Wesley Safadão, Jorge & Mateus and Matheus & Kauan. For the show, the singer invited two artists: Solange Almeida, of the Aviões do Forró, and Ivete Sangalo.

A week after the recording, the singer released on social networks a one-minute teaser with images of the DVD. During an acoustic show performed on FM 93 in Fortaleza on February 16, Joelma confirmed the release date of the DVD for March 31, 2017, but only on April 7 the DVD was placed for pre-sale on the site of Saraiva, showing firsthand the design cover that uses a photo taken by a fan. The delay for the release took place because of the piece of song "Força Estranha" by Caetano Veloso, used in the recording but that was cut from the final edition.

== Recording ==
"It will be a watershed in my life, I'm cold in the belly of anxiety."
—Joelma, to the site UOL.

Recording of the show took place on November 9, 2016 at the "Coração Sertanejo" house in São Paulo with the presence of 2,000 fans from various parts of Brazil.

On stage, three LED panels displayed projections that interact with the public according to the music, along with 12 cameras recording and a catwalk shaped like a boot, Joelma's trademark. The musicians were primarily members of the old Banda Calypso, as were the four ballet dancers. "The whole focus of this project was for Joelma and for the dancers. Most of the performances were elaborated by her and we adjusted everything for the video", said the director of the DVD, Anselmo Troncoso.

It was 11:30 pm when Joelma took to the stage, completely covered in a black cape. She sung a piece of "Força Estranha" by Caetano Veloso, before taking off the cape and revealing a silvery costume featuring jewels and shoulder pads with sleeves. The production involved pyrotechnics and 3D projections. The show then began with "Game Over", with Joelma accompanied by four dancers – two men and two women. The songs "#Partiu", "Fala Pra Mim" and "Voando Pro Pará" followed.

The show was divided into five blocks, all with a change of clothes.

In the second block were the songs "Não Teve Amor", "Chora Não Coração", "A Página Virou" and "Amor Novo" with the participation of Ivete Sangalo. The lyrics concern a lazy man being discussed by friends.

In the next block is the love song "Ai Coração", "Debaixo do Mesmo Céu", "Assunto Delicado" and "Mulher Não Chora". "Mulher Não Chora" features Solange Almeida of the band Aviões do Forró. Joelma wears a long green dress with pebbles and dances the tango during the song "Você Também Errou", featured on the Volume 4 album by Banda Calypso, never before performed live. This then turns into the Spanish track "Te Quiero". Joelma sings alongside her three children Natalia Sarraff, Yago and Yasmin the gospel song "O Amor de Deus".

The fourth block showcases the Banda Calypso, and includes the long medley "Dançando Calypso / Pra Me Conquistar / Imagino / Dudu / Temporal". As in the concerts of the Avante Tour, Joelma spins with one of her dancers at the end of "Dudu". Soon after the medley, the singer and her two dancers sit on three stools placed on stage and with rehearsed movements, remove their boots and untie their ruffled skirts, revealing a long round skirt typical of carimbó. Then begins the last performance of the block, the carimbó "Menina do Requebrado".

Joelma then returned to the stage for the fifth and final block with the elaborate choreography accompanying Spanish track "Pa'lante". The song turns into a ballad, singing and jumping with all her team a remix version of "Não Teve Amor" behind a DJ table in the center of the stage.

After closing the show and thanking the audience, Joelma left the stage to change clothes and came back using the first costumes of the night to re-record the first two songs, "Game Over" and "#Partiu", as there were problems in capturing the audio the first time. Filming finished at 5 am.

== Singles ==
"Amor Amor", recorded by Joelma with Ivete Sangalo, was chosen as the first single. In the song, Joelma sings that she wants to forget the wrong guy: "Friend, I do not know what I'm doing to hide from this guy." Ivete then responds: "Friend, I know how you feel because this happened to me." The chorus contains the lyrics: "New love, new love, this is the same as miracle tea/ If you take it gone, it will even forget your name."

For the second single, the singer was in doubt between "Mulher Não Chora" and "Chora Não Coração", this latter was chosen and confirmed by Universal Music Group via its Facebook page on April 27 as the second single from the album.

== Track listing ==
Avante – CD
No.	Title	Writer(s)	Length
1.	"Game Over"	Edilson Moreno; Gleyse Dominguez	4:26
2.	"#Partiu"	Cayron H; Louro Santos	3:13
3.	"Voando Pro Pará"	Valter Serraria; Nilk Oliveira; Chrystian Lima; Isac Maraial	3:23
4.	"Não Teve Amor"	Marília Mendonça; Juliano Tchula; Rangel Castro	3:11
5.	"Chora Não Coração"	Marcibrom	3:25
6.	"Amor Novo" (featuring Ivete Sangalo)	Marquinhos Maraial; Edu Lupa; Binho Aguiar	3:37
7.	"Ai Coração"	Louro Santos; Waldecy Moreno	3:31
8.	"Mulher Não Chora" (featuring Solange Almeida)		3:02
9.	"Debaixo do Mesmo Céu"	Marília Mendonça; Juliano Tchula; Rodrigo Cavalheiro	3:47
10.	"Assunto Delicado"	Marília Mendonça; Maraisa; Juliano Tchula	3:27
11.	"Te Quiero"	Gianko Gómez; Luiz Enrique Mejia; Cesar Lemos	3:36
12.	"O Amor de Deus" (featuring Natália, Yago and Yasmin)	Michael Sullivan; Carlos Colla	5:51
13.	"Menina do Requebrado"	Flávio Cristiano; Firmo Cardoso	3:07
14.	"Pa'Lante"	Cesar Lemos; Karla Aponte; Jorge L. Piloto	3:38
Total length:			51:10

Avante – DVD
No.	Title	Writer(s)	Length
1.	"Opening Theme"		1:05
2.	"Game Over"	Edilson Moreno; Gleyse Dominguez	4:26
3.	"#Partiu"	Cayron H; Louro Santos	3:13
4.	"Fala Pra Mim"	Louro Santos; Tinho	1:07
5.	"Voando Pro Pará"	Valter Serraria; Nilk Oliveira; Chrystian Lima; Isac Maraial	3:23
6.	"Não Teve Amor"	Marília Mendonça; Juliano Tchula; Rangel Castro	3:11
7.	"Chora Não Coração"	Marcibrom	3:25
8.	"A Página Virou"	Abimael Gomes; Léo Gomes	3:22
9.	"Amor Novo" (featuring Ivete Sangalo)	Marquinhos Maraial; Edu Lupa; Binho Aguiar	3:37
10.	"Ai Coração"	Louro Santos; Waldecy Moreno	3:31
11.	"Mulher Não Chora" (featuring Solange Almeida)		3:02
12.	"Debaixo do Mesmo Céu"	Marília Mendonça; Juliano Tchula; Rodrigo Cavalheiro	3:47
13.	"Assunto Delicado"	Marília Mendonça; Maraisa; Juliano Tchula	3:27
14.	"Você Também Errou"	Adilson Ribeiro	2:46
15.	"Te Quiero"	Gianko Gómez; Luiz Enrique Mejia; Cesar Lemos	3:36
16.	"O Amor de Deus" (featuring Natália, Yago and Yasmin)	Michael Sullivan; Carlos Colla	5:51
17.	"Dançando Calypso"	Carla Maués; Josiel Carvalho; Edilson Morenno; Glayce Dominguez; Chrystian Lima; Ivo Lima	2:45
18.	"Pra Me Conquistar"	Edilson Medeiros; Glayse Dominguez	1:58
19.	"Imagino"	Chrystian Lima; Ivo Lima	1:11
20.	"Dudu"	Tonny Brasil	2:30
21.	"Temporal"	Brizola	1:53
22.	"Menina do Requebrado"	Flávio Cristiano; Firmo Cardoso	3:47
23.	"Pa'Lante"	Cesar Lemos; Karla Aponte; Jorge L. Piloto	3:41
24.	"Não Teve Amor" (Brabo Remix)	Marília Mendonça; Juliano Tchula; Rangel Castro	3:22
25.	"Making Of" (Extras)
Total length:			1:22:00
