= Maro (Portuguese singer) =

Portuguese singer and songwriter (born 1994)

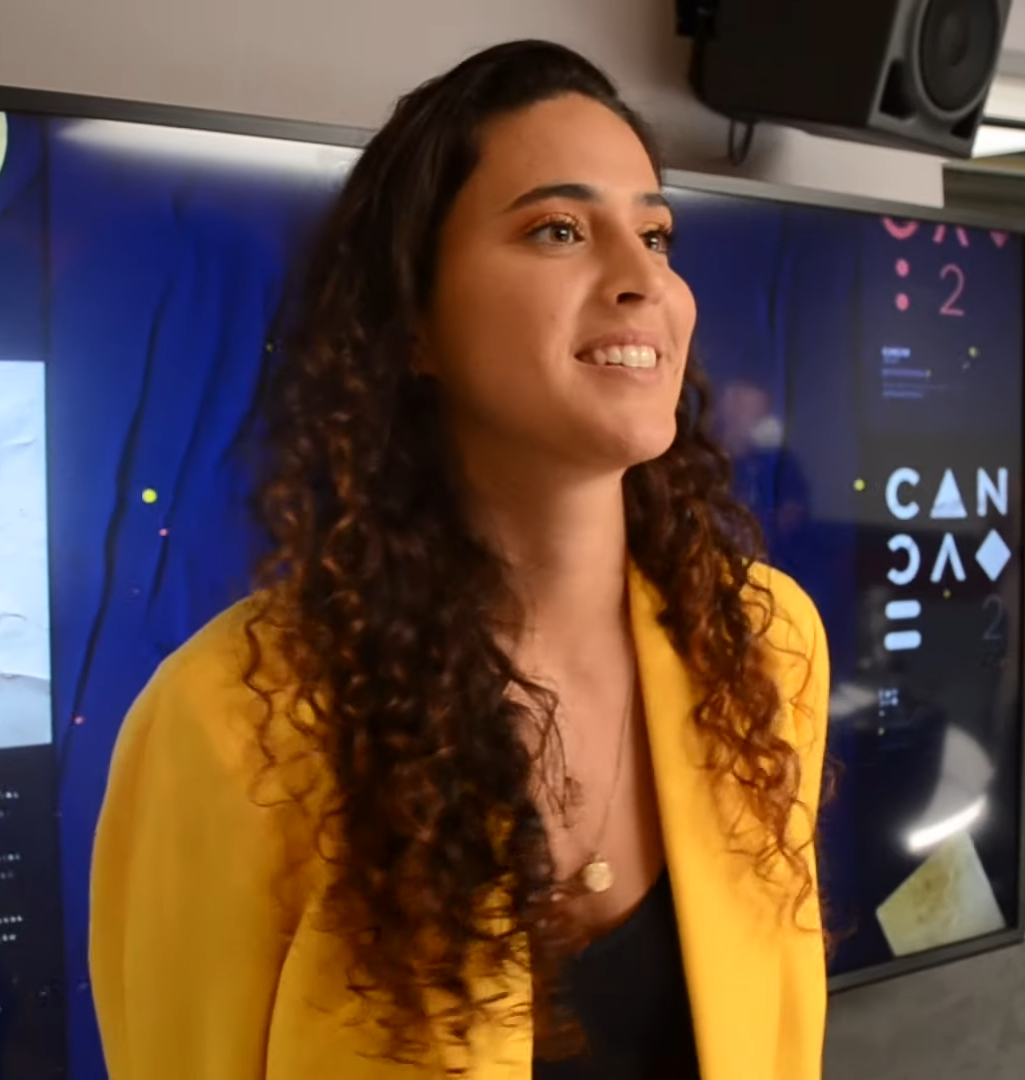
- Maro in 2022

Background information
- Born: Mariana Brito da Cruz Forjaz Secca; 30 October 1994 (age 31); Lisbon, Portugal
- Occupations: Singer; songwriter

Mariana Brito da Cruz Forjaz Secca (born 30 October 1994), known professionally as Maro (stylised in all caps), is a Portuguese singer and songwriter. She won Festival da Canção 2022 and represented Portugal in the Eurovision Song Contest 2022 in Turin, Italy with the song "Saudade, saudade".

== Early life and education ==
Mariana is the second of the three children of João Pedro Basto Forjaz Secca and Cristina Isabel Capello Brito da Cruz. She initially planned to become a veterinarian, but instead chose to pursue a musical career, studying at Berklee College of Music and moving to Los Angeles.

== Career ==
She collaborated with Jacob Collier on his 2019 album Djesse Vol. 2 and has a presence on YouTube, where she has posted videos of herself singing with artists such as António Zambujo, Rosa Passos, Eric Clapton, Mayra Andrade, Salvador Sobral, and many others.

She is featured on the track "Better Now" by American electronic music duo Odesza, the second single from the album The Last Goodbye. As of April 2022, the song peaked at 19th on the Dance/Electronic Billboard Chart.

== Discography ==
=== Studio albums ===
List of studio albums, with selected details
Title	Details	Peak chart positions
Title	Details	POR
Maro, Vol. 1	Released: 30 March 2018; Label: Secca Records; Formats: Digital download, streaming	—
Maro, Vol. 2	Released: 30 April 2018; Label: Secca Records; Formats: Digital download, streaming	—
Maro, Vol. 3	Released: 30 June 2018; Label: Secca Records; Formats: Digital download, streaming	—
Maro & Manel (with Manuel Rocha)	Released: 30 October 2018; Label: Secca Records; Formats: Digital download, streaming	—
It's OK	Released: 30 November 2018; Label: Secca Records; Formats: Digital download, streaming	—
Can You See Me?	Released: 26 August 2022; Label: Secca Records; Formats: Digital download, streaming	—
Hortelã	Released: 7 April 2023; Label: Secca Records; Formats: Digital download, streaming	128
Lifeline (with Nasaya)	Released: 15 January 2025; Label: Secca Records, Venice Music; Formats: Digital download, streaming	—
So Much Has Changed	Released: 27 January 2026; Label: Secca Records, Venice Music; Formats: Digital download, streaming	7
"—" denotes a recording that did not chart or was not released in that territory.

=== Extended plays ===
List of EPs, with selected details
Title	Details
Pirilampo (with Nasaya)	Released: 20 August 2021; Label: Foreign Family Collective; Formats: Digital download, streaming
Maro ilumina Sonastério	Released: 30 November 2022; Label: Secca & Co.; Formats: Digital download, streaming
I Don't Wanna Feel That Way (with Nasaya)	Released: 7 January 2025; Label: Secca Records, Venice Music; Formats: Digital download, streaming
Live Trio Sessions	Released: 14 August 2025; Label: Secca Records, Venice Music; Formats: Digital download, streaming

=== Singles ===
==== As lead artist ====
List of singles, with selected chart positions
Title	Year	Peak chart positions							Album or EP
Title	Year	POR	ICE	IRE	LTU	NLD	SWE	SWI	Album or EP
"Midnight Purple" (featuring Nasaya)	2019	—	—	—	—	—	—	—	Non-album singles
"What Difference Will It Make"	2019	—	—	—	—	—	—	—	Non-album singles
"Tempo" (with Nasaya)	2021	—	—	—	—	—	—	—	Pirilampo
"I See It Coming" (with Nasaya)	2021	—	—	—	—	—	—	—	Pirilampo
"Saudade, saudade"	2022	3	13	93	3	6	68	79	Festival da Canção 2022
"Am I Not Enough for Now?"	2022	—	—	—	—	—	—	—	Can You See Me?
"We've Been Loving in Silence"	2022	—	—	—	—	—	—	—	Can You See Me?
"It Keeps On Raining"	2022	—	—	—	—	—	—	—	Can You See Me?
"Like We're Wired"	2022	—	—	—	—	—	—	—	Can You See Me?
"Lifeline" (with Nasaya)	2024	—	—	—	—	—	—	—	Lifeline
"We Could Be" (with Nasaya)	2024	—	—	—	—	—	—	—	Lifeline
"Chiquitinha" (with Nasaya)	2024	—	—	—	—	—	—	—	Lifeline
"Cais"	2025	—	—	—	—	—	—	—	Non-album single
"I Owe It to You"	2025	—	—	—	—	—	—	—	So Much Has Changed
"So Much Has Changed"	2025	—	—	—	—	—	—	—	So Much Has Changed
"Kiss Me"	2026	— (Note: "Kiss Me" did not enter the Top 200 Singles chart, but peaked at number one on the Top Airplay Radios chart.)	*	—	—	—	—	—	So Much Has Changed
"Era de aquário/Deixa o sol entrar" (with Ana Moura)	2026	—	*	—	—	—	—	—	Non-album singles
"Sauvignon Blanc"	2026	—	*	—	—	—	—	—	Non-album singles
"Tanto para dar"	2026	—	*	—	—	—	—	—	Non-album singles
"—" denotes a recording that did not chart or was not released in that territory. "*" denotes that the chart did not exist at that time.

==== As featured artist ====
Title	Year	Album or EP
"It Ain't Working" (Figùra featuring Maro)	2018	Place to Be
"Não me deixes" (Carolina Deslandes featuring Maro)	2018	Casa
"Pra onde vais tu aí" (David Carreira featuring Maro)	2018	7
"Euforia" (Ox featuring Maro)	2018	De Cara Limpa
"Diz me quanto" (MavTraxx featuring Maro and Cleon Edwards)	2019	Family Ties
"Move On" (Noé Zagroun featuring Maro)	2019	Non-album singles
"O filho do recluso" (Ferdinando Arnò featuring Maro, Vince Mendoza, and Marco Decimo)	2019	Non-album singles
"Moreninha" (Monda featuring Maro)	2019	Cal
"Takin' It Slow" (SirAiva featuring Maro)	2019	Family Ties
"Norte y sur" (Bebo San Juan featuring Maro)	2019	La vuelta al mundo
"Mi condena" (Vic Mirallas featuring Maro)	2019	Volumen 2
"Lua" (Jacob Collier featuring Maro)	2019	Djesse Vol. 2
"Why" (Ariza featuring Maro)	2019	Why Am I
"Sense" (Judit Neddermann featuring Maro)	2021	Aire
"Se fores à Quinta Nova" (Marito Marques featuring Maro, Os Vocalistas, and Luís Trigacheiro)	2021	A ponte
"Walk Above the City" (The Paper Kites featuring Maro)	2021	Roses
"Corazón" (80purppp featuring Maro)	2021	Non-album single
"Mãe" (Munir Hossn featuring Maro)	2021	Vientre
"Amor ao longe" (Marito Marques featuring Maro and Salvador Sobral)	2021	A ponte
"Day Fire" (Paraleven featuring Maro)	2021	Apollo
"Damunt de tu Només les flors" (Gerald Clayton featuring Maro, John Clayton, and Justin Brown)	2022	Bells On Sand
"Better Now" (Odesza featuring Maro)	2022	The Last Goodbye
"Alambari" (Antonio Sánchez featuring Maro)	2022	Shift (Bad Hombre, Vol. II)
"Estrelas e raiz" (Sílvia Pérez Cruz featuring Maro and Rita Payés)	2022	Toda la vida, un día
"Shame On Me" (Pedro Altério featuring Maro)	2023	De Cara Limpa
"Sonhos & Ilusões" (Julia Mestre featuring Maro)	2023	Arrepiada
"Tudo (Interlúdio)" (Bárbara Bandeira featuring Maro)	2023	Finda
"Isso" (Isaura featuring Maro)	2023	Non-album singles
"No ho has entès" (Pol Batlle featuring Maro)	2024	Non-album singles
"Leave Your Love" (Parcels featuring Maro)	2024	Leaveyourlove
"Tal vez" (Vic Mirallas featuring Maro)	2025	Non-album singles
"Do raso ao fundo" (Mariana Nolasco featuring Maro)	2025	Non-album singles
"The Wandering" (Patrick Watson featuring Maro)	2025	Uh Oh
"Gloria" (Shai Maestro featuring Maro)	2026	The Guesthouse
"Odore dell'Asfalto" (Carbeau featuring Maro)	2026	Odore dell'Asfalto

=== Other charted songs ===
Title	Year	Peak chart positions	Album or EP
Title	Year	POR Air.	Album or EP
"Feeling So Nice"	2026	74	So Much Has Changed

== Awards and nominations ==
Year	Award	Category	Work	Result	Ref.
2022	International Portuguese Music Awards	Song of the Year	"Amor ao longe" (Marito Marques featuring Salvador Sobral and Maro)	Nominated	
2022	International Portuguese Music Awards	Best Pop Performance	"Amor ao longe" (Marito Marques featuring Salvador Sobral and Maro)	Won	
2022	Gala dos Globos de Ouro	Best Interpretation	Herself	Nominated	
2022	Gala dos Globos de Ouro	Best Performance	Final of 2022 Festival da Canção	Nominated	
2022	Gala dos Globos de Ouro	Best Song	"saudade, saudade"	Nominated	
2022	Gala dos Globos de Ouro	Best New Artist	Herself	Nominated	
2023	PLAY - Portuguese Music Awards	Vodafone Song of the Year	"saudade, saudade"	Nominated	
2023	PLAY - Portuguese Music Awards	Best Female Artist	Herself	Nominated	
2023	NIT Awards	Best Original Song	"saudade, saudade"	Won	
2023	NIT Awards	Best Female Artist	Herself	Nominated	
2024	Prémio José Afonso	Album of the Year	hortelã	Won	
2025	PLAY - Portuguese Music Awards	Best Female Artist	Herself	Nominated	
2025	Gala dos Globos de Ouro	Best Performance	Teatro Tivoli BBVA	Nominated	
2026	PLAY - Portuguese Music Awards	Best Female Artist	Herself	Nominated	
2026	Gala dos Globos de Ouro	Best Interpretation	Herself	Nominated	
2026	Gala dos Globos de Ouro	Best Performance	Coliseu de Lisboa	Nominated	
2026	Gala dos Globos de Ouro	Best Song	"Kiss me"	Nominated	

== Notes ==
Awards and achievements
Preceded by The Black Mamba with "Love Is on My Side"	Portugal in the Eurovision Song Contest; 2022	Succeeded by Mimicat with "Ai coração"
