= Delicado =

Delicado (Spanish and Portuguese "delicate") may refer to

- "Delicado" (song), from 1952 with music by Valdir Azevedo and lyrics by Jack Lawrence
- Assunto Delicado, an EP of the Brazilian singer Joelma (2016)
- Francisco Delicado, a Renaissance writer
- José Delicado Baeza, a Roman Catholic archbishop
