= Joelma (EP) =

EP by Joelma

EP Joelma
- Cover of the first EP Joelma on her solo career.

EP by Joelma
- Released: March 24, 2016
- Recorded: 2015–2016
- Genres: Brega Pop; Calypso; Cúmbia; Lambada; Pop Latino; Salsa; Zouk
- Length: 13:08
- Label: Universal Music Group
- Producers: Joelma; Tovinho

Joelma chronology
EP Joelma (2016)	Joelma (2016)

Joelma is the first extended play (EP) of the Brazilian singer Joelma, released on March 24, 2016 under the seal of Universal Music Group only digital download in iTunes Store. With four unreleased tracks, the EP is a preview of the first Joelma studio album, and all 4 EP tracks are present on the disc "Joelma".

== Background ==
During an interview with G1 in March 2016, Joelma already point in the news:

"First will be released my EP with four solo songs, including the first work of music "Não Teve Amor". Then, to the first half of April, the CD will be released. Until then, my audience can already get a taste of what is to come, as will sing three new songs at the shows of tour, in addition to old successes already recorded"

The songs present in the EP only "Ai Coração" and "Não Teve Amor" had been placed for free download and presented to the public.

The EP reached 3rd place in Brazil iTunes.

== Track listing ==
Joelma EP
No.	Title	Writer(s)	Length
1.	"Não Teve Amor"	Marília Mendonça; Juliano Tchula; Rangel Castro	3:12
2.	"Se Vira Aí"	Zel Moreira; Cecilio Nena	3:03
3.	"Ai Coração"	Louro Santos; Veneci Moreno	3:28
4.	"A Página Virou"	Abimael Gomes; Léo Gomes	3:23
Total length:			13:08

== Reception ==
The general album received positive reviews.

Vinícius Cunha of the site "Gshow" He said the registration mark to overcome after the tumultuous divorce and left the band late last year, is an open letter from a woman well settled and ready to conquer the world again. "Não Teve Amor" is considered the cry of freedom of Joelma, flagship of the launch and the singer found that no relationship post-end life and delivers a candidate to hit the old group's success templates, the Caribbean calypso dominating the track. "Se Vira Aí" comes as a zouk with electronic elements, showing that Joelma is focused on stepping on the painful betrayal. The singer says that those who lost out in the coexistence was the other side. "Ai Coração" announces a nostalgic ballad, is not the night to the day we forget a love, and Joelma know it. But also aware that it is much larger than the phase that seeks to disentangle. The verses prove that the wound is still open, but that is about to turn around. "A Página Virou" is seen as an unusual meeting of the repertoire Banda Calypso with "The Wheel" by Sarajane and is considered one of the best tracks on the CD. A renewed Joelma is to come on his solo debut and "A Página Virou" is his biggest test.

== Commercial performance ==
Within hours, the self-titled digital EP of four tracks, reached the third position in the "Top Albums" of iTunes Store Brazil getting forward artists like Wesley Safadão and Adele.
