= Heavy Light =

Heavy Light may refer to:

- Heavy Light (Norton album), 2020
- Heavy Light (U.S. Girls album), 2020
- "Heavy Light", a 2005 song by Animusic
