= Norton (album) =

Studio album by Norton
- Released: 10 March 2014
- Recorded: Golden Pony Studios, Lisbon
- Label: Skud & Smarty Records

Norton chronology
Layers of Love United (2011)	Norton (2014)	Heavy Light (2020)

Singles from Norton
- 1. "Magnets" Released: 20 January 2014; 2. "Brava" Released: 7 July 2014; 3. "Drifting Ballet" Released: 16 February 2015

Norton is the fourth album by Portuguese band Norton, released in March 2014 on CD and in red vinyl, simultaneously with a Japanese edition. The first single from the record was "Magnets", which was one of the most played songs in Portuguese radio stations that year. "Brava" and "Drifting Ballet" were the other singles of the album.

The album was recorded at Golden Pony Studios, in Lisbon, Portugal. It was recorded and mixed by Eduardo Vinhas and Norton, and mastered by Robin Schmidt at 24-96 Mastering in Karlsruhe, Germany.

The cover photo is by Fabian Oefner. The artwork was made by Liliana Graça.

== Track listing ==
No.	Title	Length
1.	"Magnets"	3:56
2.	"Premiere"	3:12
3.	"Drifting Ballet"	4:42
4.	"Hours & Days"	5:27
5.	"Directions"	6:59
6.	"Brava"	3:04
7.	"European"	3:46
8.	"Düe"	4:32
Total length:		34:27
