= Fado Bicha =

Portuguese musical activist duo

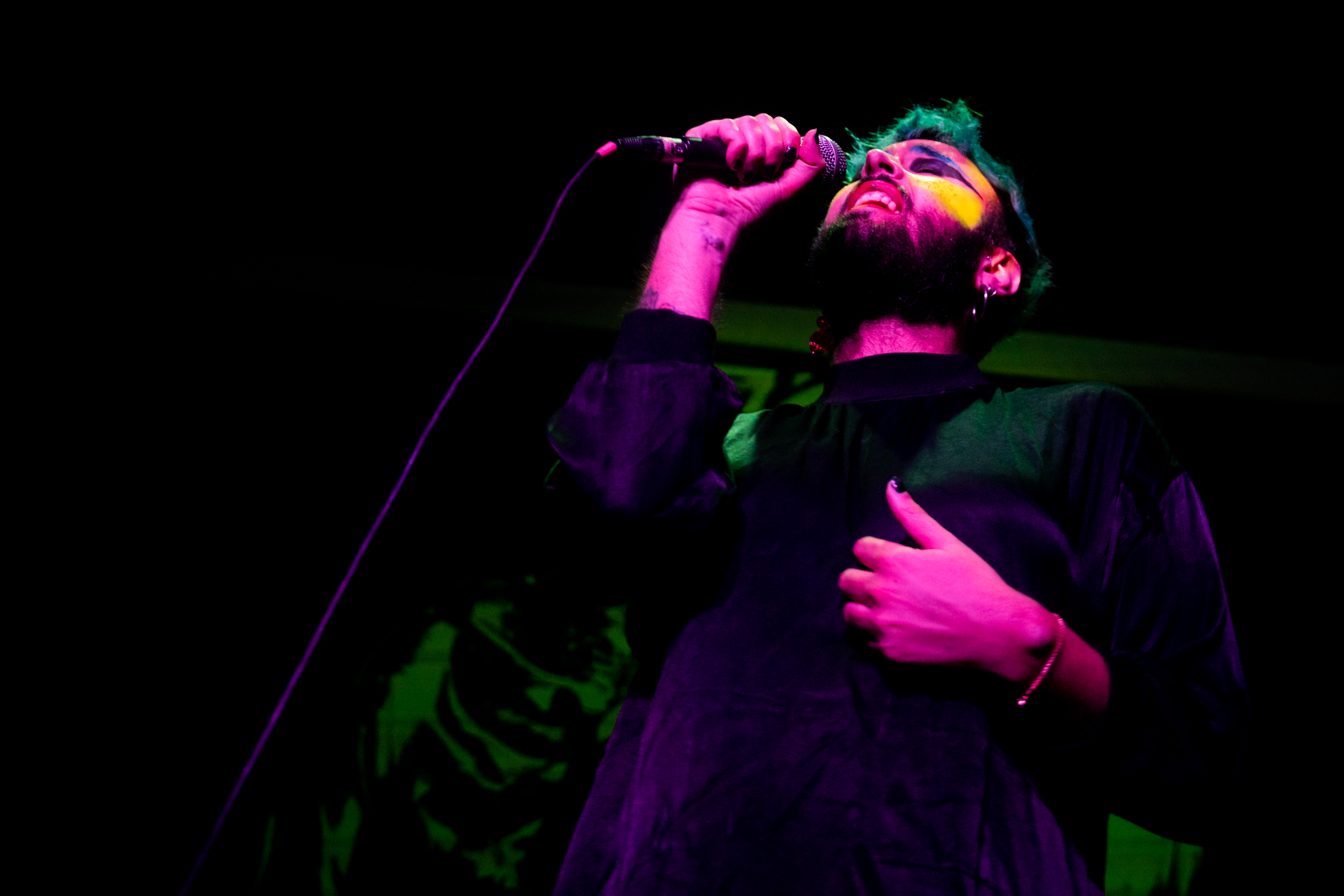
- Lila Fadista

Background information
- Origin: Lisbon, Portugal
- Years active: 2017–present
- Members: Lila Fadista, João Caçador
- Website: https://www.fadobicha.com/

Fado Bicha, meaning queer fado, is a Portuguese musical and activist duo formed by Lila Fadista and João Caçador.

== History ==
Fado Bicha was formed in March 2017, when Lila Fadista sought to create a channel that would allow her to explore her artistic and activist aspirations revolving around fado and her queer identity. Soon after she started singing by herself in FavelaLx, a bar in Alfama, Lisbon, she caught the attention of João Caçador. Caçador was persuaded by a friend to start practicing with Lila, and he ended joining the project as a guitarist.

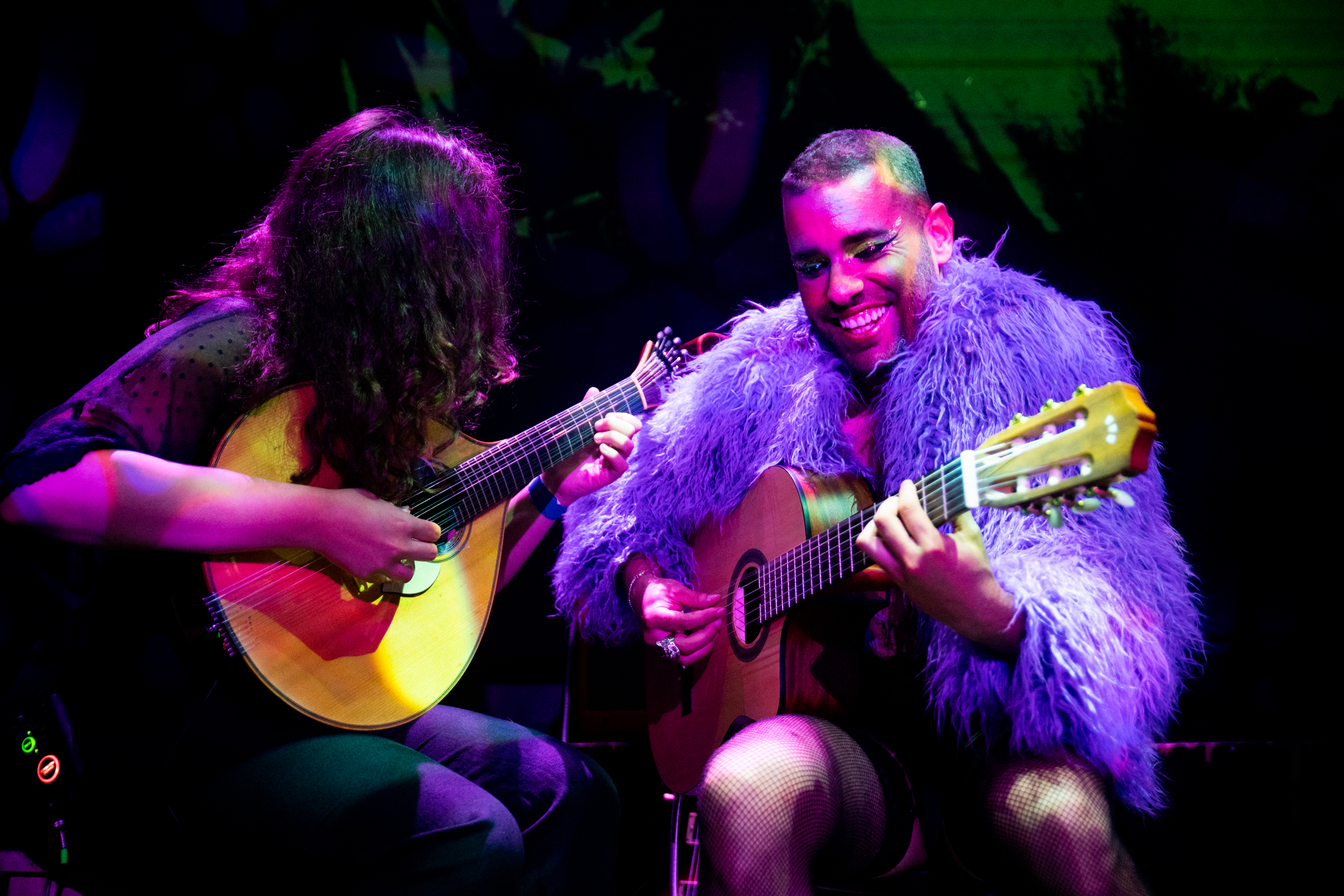
João Caçador (to the right), during a concert with Fernanda Maciel (to the left, playing Portuguese guitar)

In 2018, after a year playing in several small venues in Lisbon, the duo was invited to play in the festival Política, where they played for 500 people in São Jorge Cinema and in the closing ceremony of the sixth European forum commemorating IDAHOT.

In 2019, after two years performing in approximately 100 concenters, the duo debuted its first single, O Namorico do André (the flirtation of André), an adaptation of the fado song Namorico da Rita, originally sung by Amália Rodrigues.

That same year, they also released a version of the song A Mulher do Fim do Mundo from the album of the same name, by Elza Soares and Lila Fadista, the first single from their debut album OCUPAÇÃO.

They participated in the 2022 edition of Festival da Canção, with the song Povo Pequenino, but they did not manage to qualify for the final. They also contributed to the ninth edition of the magazine Headmaster with nine-part musical story called Every name is punishment.

The album OCUPAÇÃO was produced by Moullinex (Luís Clara Gomes) and released in 2022, almost three years after its announcement. It was described as one of the best Portuguese albums of the year by Blitz and it was featured in the end of year reviews of Antena 3 and digital magazines such as Rimas e Batidas and Espalha-Factos. That same year, Larie (fka Labaq), a Brazilian non-binary player of various musical instruments joined the duo for live concerts.

Lila and Caçador have also acted in plays such as Xtròrdinário (2019) and Casa Portuguesa (2022–2024), by Pedro Penim and in films such as À procura de António Botto (2019), by Cristina Ferreira Gomes, A mulher sem corpo (2021), by António Borges Correia. Caçador also acted in Fogo-fátuo (2022) by João Pedro Rodrigues.

== Awards and recognitions ==
In 2019, Fado Bicha received an Arco-Íris (rainbow) award, by the Portuguese branch of ILGA.

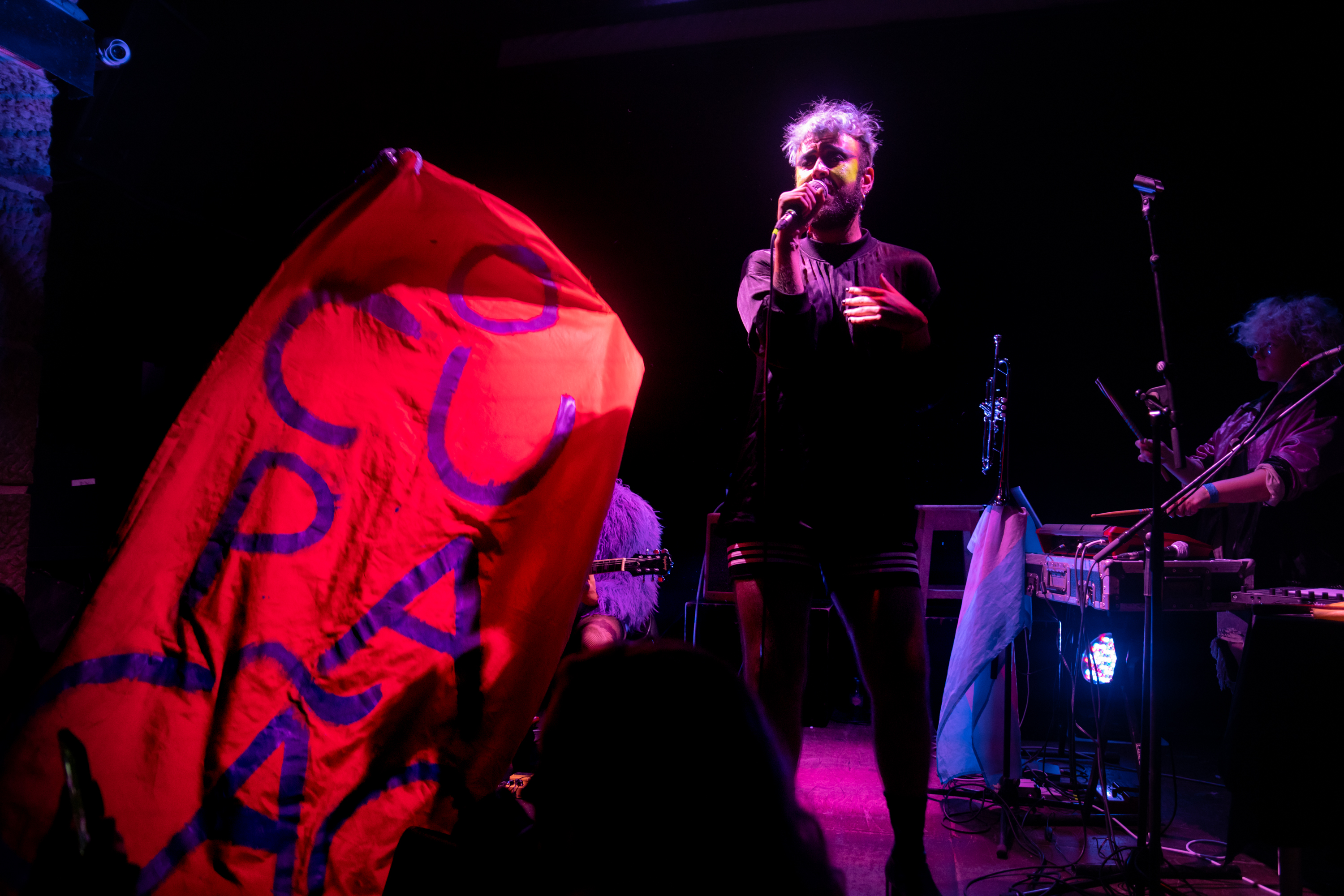
Ocupação

== Discography ==
Fado Bicha's discography includes:

- O Namorico do André (Single, 2019)
- Mulher do Fim do Mundo (Single, 2019)
- Lila Fadista (Single, 2019)
- Every name is punishment: an exercise for Headmaster magazine (EP, 2021)
- OCUPAÇÃO (LP, 2022)

== Controversy ==
In January 2023, the duo was a part of a controversial protest, where Keyla Brasil, a Brazilian trans citizen living in Portugal, invaded the stage during a theater adaptation of the movie Tudo Sobre a Minha Mãe in Teatro São Luiz. Brasil demanded that the actor André Patrício leave the stage, due to him being a cisgender actor interpreting a trans character. The shows was canceled immediately, and Patrício was replaced in future shows by the play's organizers by the trans actress Maria João Vaz. This protest was reported in Portuguese and Brazilian media.
