= The Black Mamba (band) =

Portuguese band

- Origin: Sintra, Portugal
- Years active: 2010–present
- Members: Pedro Tatanka; Miguel Casais; Marco Pombinho; Rui Pedro "Pity" Vaz; Guilherme "Gui" Salgueiro; Francisco “Xico” Fernandes

The Black Mamba is a Portuguese band. They represented Portugal in the Eurovision Song Contest 2021 in Rotterdam with the song "Love Is on My Side". The band has released four albums: The Black Mamba (2010), Dirty Little Brother (2014), The Mamba King (2018) and Last Night in Amsterdam (2024).

== Discography ==
=== Albums ===
Title	Details	Peak chart positions
Title	Details	POR
The Black Mamba	Released: 2010; Format: Digital download, CD; Label: Farol Música	—
Dirty Little Brother	Released: 2014; Format: Digital download, CD; Label: Farol Música	15
The Mamba King	Released: 2018; Format: Digital download, CD; Label: La Resistance	5
Last Night in Amsterdam	Released: 15 November 2024; Format: Digital download, CD	—
Lost in London	Released: 24 October 2025; Format: Digital download, CD	—
"—" denotes a recording that did not chart or was not released.

=== Singles ===
==== As lead artist ====
Title	Year	Peak chart positions				Album
Title	Year	POR	NLD	SWE Heat.	UK Down.	Album
"If I Ain't You"	2012	—	—	—	—	The Black Mamba
"Wonder Why" (featuring Aurea)	2014	—	—	—	—	Dirty Little Brother
"Canção de mim mesmo" (featuring Boss AC)	2016	—	—	—	—	Non-album singles
"I Wanna Be With You"	2017	—	—	—	—	Non-album singles
"Believe"	2018	—	—	—	—	The Mamba King
"Love Is on My Side"	2021	44	70	5	55	Non-album singles
"Crazy Nando"	2021	—	—	—	—	Last Night in Amsterdam

==== As featured artist ====
Title	Year	Album
"Beautiful Lie" (Light Gun Fire feat. The Black Mamba)	2020	Non-album single

Awards and achievements
Preceded by Elisa with "Medo de sentir"	Portugal in the Eurovision Song Contest; 2021	Succeeded by Maro with "Saudade, saudade"
