= Layers of Love United =

Studio album by Norton
- Released: 28 March 2011
- Recorded: Golden Pony Studios, Lisbon
- Label: Skud & Smarty Records

Norton chronology
Kersche (2007)	Layers of Love United (2011)	Norton (2014)

Singles from Layers of Love United
- 1. "Two Points" Released: 10 February 2011; 2. "Coastline" Released: 1 November 2011; 3. "Glowing Suite" Released: 18 April 2012; 4. "Layers"

Layers of Love United is the third album from Norton. It was the band's first record with Pedro Afonso on lead vocals.

"Two Points" was a hit single and the song with most airplay on Antena 3 Radio Station during that year.
The Japanese version of the album was released in June and has three acoustic bonus tracks. One of them is a version of "Paris", by the British band Friendly Fires.
Layers of Love United was released on vinyl in 2012, in a limited edition, numbered and in white vinyl, which also includes "Paris" as a bonus track. In the same year the band released the EP Live Acoustic, which has six songs from Layers of Love United played live acoustically, in a showcase in Lisbon, Portugal.

Miguel Nicolau, Portuguese guitar player, plays as a guest musician on "Two Points", "Coastline" and "Layers".
The cover art was made by Bráulio Amado.

== Track listing ==
No.	Title	Length
1.	"Two Points"	3:29
2.	"Daydreams"	3:38
3.	"Coastline"	4:13
4.	"Glowing Suite"	4:29
5.	"Satellites"	2:38
6.	"Japan"	3:57
7.	"Summer for Tomorrow"	2:43
8.	"Into the Lights"	3:39
9.	"Layers"	4:52
Total length:		36:29
