= Joelma (singer) =

Brazilian singer, songwriter, dancer and choreographer (born 1974)

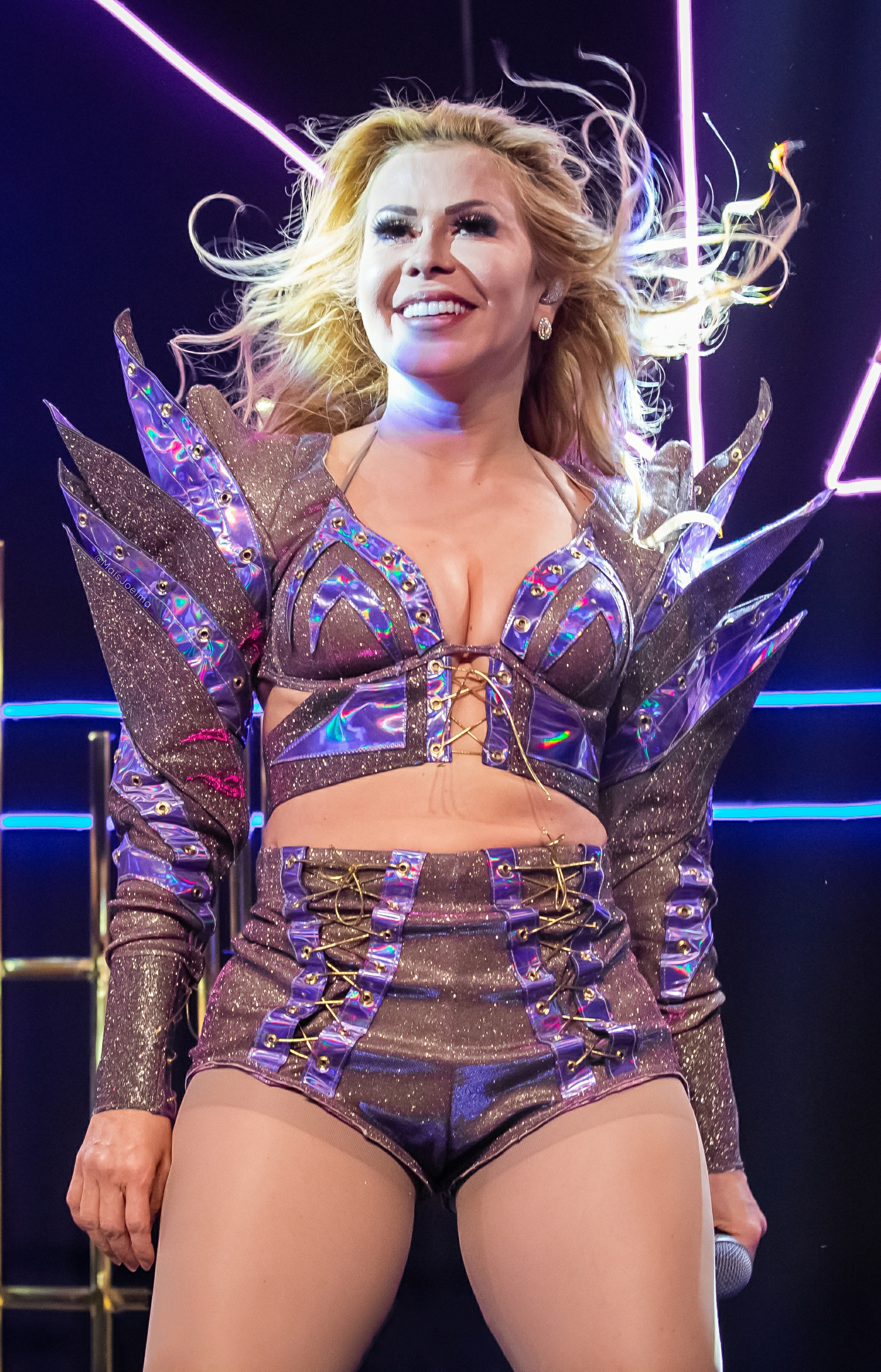
- Joelma performing in 2018
- Born: June 22, 1974 (age 52); Almeirim, Pará, Brazil
- Occupations: Singer; songwriter; dancer
- Years active: 1994–present
- Spouse: Ximbinha (m. 1999; div. 2015)
- Children: 3
- Musical career
- Genres: Brega; cumbia; carimbó; zouk; bachata; merengue; lambada; soca
- Instruments: Vocals; guitar
- Labels: ONErpm; Universal Music; Radar Records; Som Livre; Sony Music; Independent
- Website: joelmaoficial.com.br

Joelma da Silva Mendes, best known only as Joelma (born June 22, 1974) is a Brazilian singer, songwriter, and dancer. The singer since the age of 19, Joelma began her career in 1994, and in 1998 she met and married the musician and producer, Ximbinha, forming with him the Banda Calypso in 1999. As lead vocalist of Banda Calypso, she achieved fame and success, and sold over 15 million copies worldwide. In 2015, Joelma and Ximbinha announced the end of marriage and the band, giving birth to the recording of their first album only in the same year.

On April 29, 2016, her released debut album as solo artist, the homonym Joelma, released through Universal Music, debuted in second place on the Pro-Música Brazil album chart Brazil (PMB) and the Billboard Brazil Albums Chart. From that album, the first single "Não Teve Amor", along with the tracks "Ai Coração" and "Debaixo do Mesmo Céu". On April 28, 2017, Joelma released the first DVD and live album, Avante. The project generated singles like "Amor Novo", which features Brazilian singer Ivete Sangalo, and "Chora Não Coração".

Joelma is world renowned for her performance and vocal irreverence. Throughout her career, she sold about 22 million albums, becoming one of the most sold artists in the history of the Brazilian music industry. She and singer Ivete Sangalo are the only Latin American artists to receive a fivefold diamond record album certification. In her career, she won several important awards including Melhores do Ano, Multishow Brazilian Music Award, Troféu Imprensa, as well as compete three times a Latin Grammy. Joelma is also internationally known, performing in countries such as Portugal, United States, Switzerland, Germany, Spain, Italy, Angola, England, Sweden, Cape Verde, Bolivia, Peru, Argentina and French Guiana. She was found four times - in 2008, 2009, 2011 and 2012 respectively - one of the 100 most women sexy world of all time by the magazine VIP. Joelma has an estimated net worth of more than R $300 million, and has been elected several times by Forbes as of 2011 as one of the best paid singers of the year in the country.

== Biography ==
Joelma Mendes da Silva was born in the city of Almeirim, Pará, on June 22, 1974, daughter seamstress Maria de Nazaré da Silva Mendes and gold miner José Benahum Mendes, being the fifth of the couple's seven children. Joelma claims to have been the victim of domestic violence in childhood; Her father was an alcoholic, and brutally assaulted his wife and children, and later, he would abandon them when Joelma was only eight years old. Because of this, she and her siblings were forced to be raised only by their mother and had no contact with their father for about 35 years. Years after her father's abandonment, two of her brothers were murdered.

"I wanted the music inside my room, alone, just me and the music. I would come home after school and dance until the world ends in front of the mirror [...] I always kept humming in the school breaks Then a friend, who used to make a keyboard and a voice in the bar, stayed for a year calling me to sing with him.I walked in for fun.I came into the music and it was very clear. Then I left, my life did not go.When I turned 23, said: It's now or never. I got on board and it worked."

— Joelma about the beginning of his career.

Her interest in music happened during the end of her childhood to the beginning of her youth, when she sang in the musical choir of an evangelical church, where his mother worked as a choral conductor. As a teenager, Joelma began to participate and win talent shows at a local festival performing dubbing by artists such as Sula Miranda and Xuxa. At the age of 19, he made his local debut performing for the first time at the Art and Culture Fair of Almeirim (Fearca). The event was recorded in videotape and given by a friend of Joelma, to the then producer and instrumentalist of the band Fazendo Arte, Nide Braga. Nide was looking for a singer who had a good performance on the stage and, after seeing the performance of the young woman in the images, ended up inviting her to participate in a test to join the band. Initially, Joelma refused the invitation, since she did not pretend to become a singer, aiming to join the profession of lawyer, but he came to accept it. With that, Joelma moved to Belém.

In 1994, after being approved, it signs with Gravasom and they release the debut album of the group, the self-titled Fazendo Arte. In 1996, the second and last album the group is available, the titled band Banda Fazendo Arte II, issued by the newly formed label Atração Fonográfica. In the band, with the exception of vocalist, Joelma also acted as choreographer, dancer, stylist and backing vocal. In 1998, she left the group and founded the band Eu, whose band name refers to Joelma herself, for "being ashamed" of her name at the beginning, ending the band's activities in the same year to pursue a career as an artist ground. In 1998 also, at a luncheon in the singer's home Kim Marques in Belém, Joelma met musician and music producer Ximbinha. Thus, Joelma invited him to produce her debut album as a solo artist. At the time, her stage name was signed as Joelma Lins. During the recordings, they started dating, and after completion of the workproduction, chose to discard it and founded a new band, which is the Banda Calypso, founded in June 1999.

== Career ==
=== 1993–99: Career with the band Fazendo Arte ===
In the middle of 1993, Joelma participated in the fair of art and culture of her native land, where she was well known throughout the region and was invited to perform in Belém. From there, Joelma received the invitation to sing in Fazendo Arte, where the singer was part of the group along with nine other members, sang in the band for six years until she decided to record her first solo album.

=== 1999–2015: Career with the Banda Calypso ===
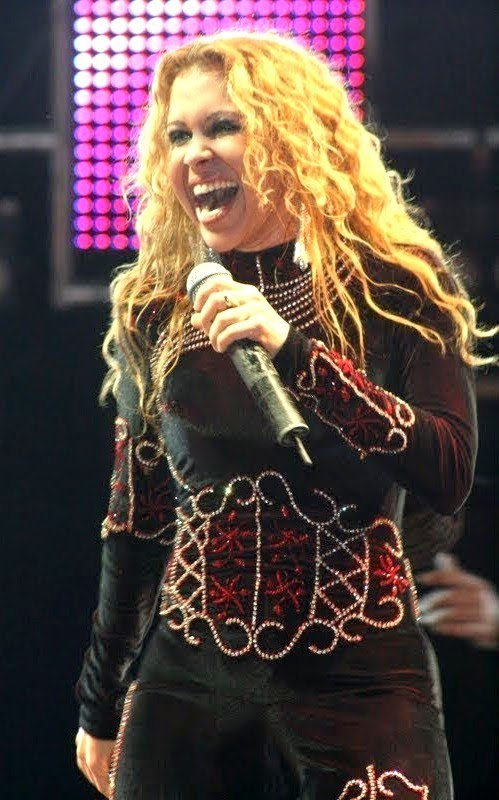
Joelma performing in Banda Calypso's concert in 2007.

Joelma is the one who made and built the choreography of Banda Calypso, while still participating in the band. She is known for her soft voice, high-heeled boots, move hair, and the ability to sing and dance at the same time. She has won countless awards for her performance as a vocalist for the band Calypso, and has been considered by four times one of the sexiest women in the world by VIP magazine. The band totaled 21 official albums, having sold more than 15 million copies in Brazil and abroad.

==== Disbandment ====
After her separation from ex-husband Ximbinha, Joelma announced in the Programa da Sabrina, which aired on August 29, 2015, that she would disconnect from the Banda Calypso in December and would follow a solo career, with the same rhythm that gave her notoriety.

I'll stay at Calypso by the end of the year. I'll let the Calypso and I will follow my solo career, but in the same style of Calypso.

— says Joelma.

Sites speculated that she could pursue a gospel career, but the singer made it clear that she wanted to keep up with the rhythm that enshrined her on the world stage. In a presentation in Goiânia, on August 28, the singer thanked the fans for their support and reinforced her departure from the band with a final commitment on December 31, and then, she would begin to "serve God" singing at the same pace.

=== 2016–present: solo career ===
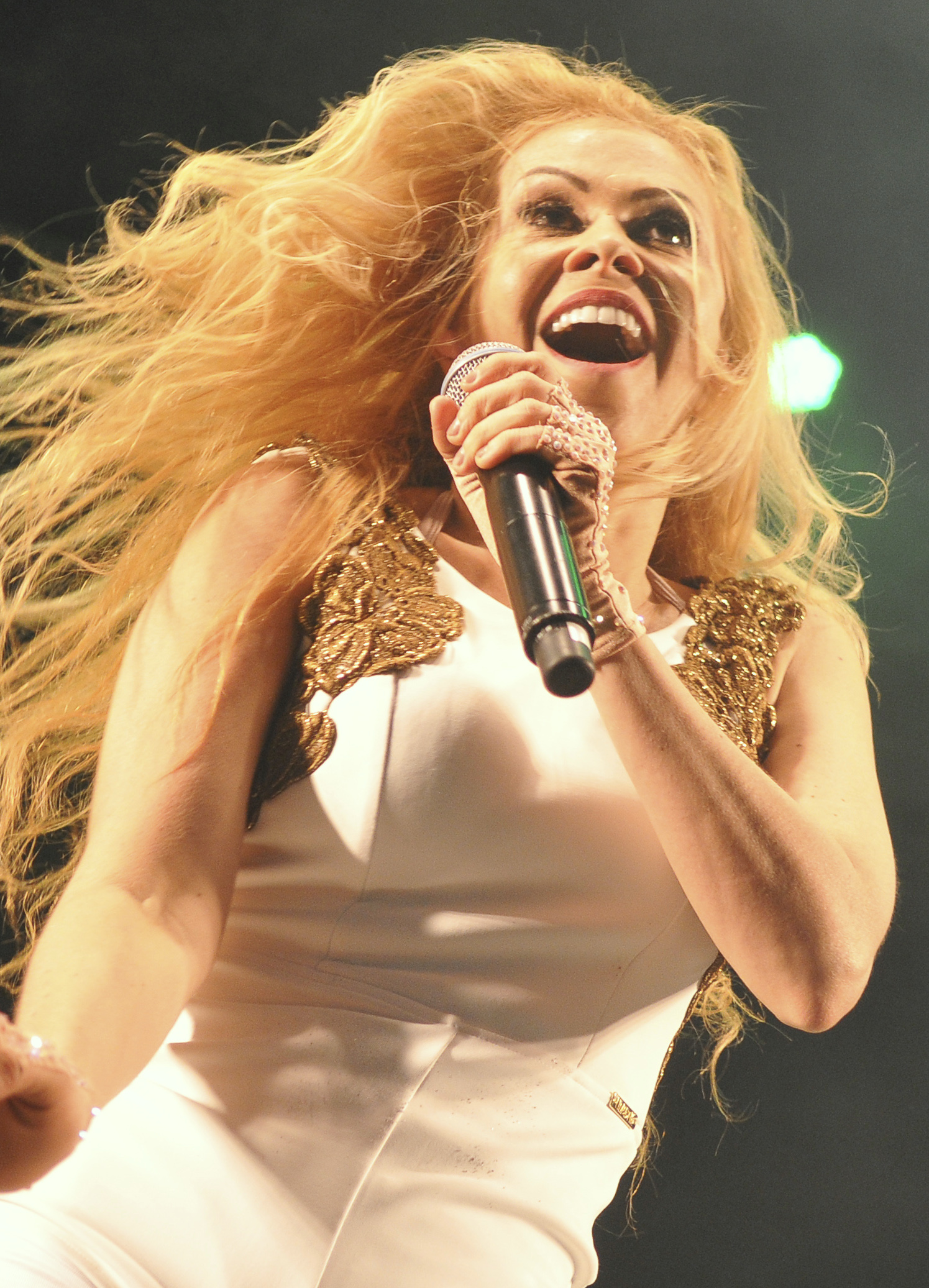
Joelma performing in 2018.

Three months after the end of the Calypso Band, Joelma signed an agreement with the Universal Music label on March 8, 2016, being the responsibility of the artist's stamp and image rights. Joelma had full freedom to produce and accompany her creation from her debut album as a solo artist. The album cover portrays the singer as a heroine and is signed by the cartoonist Carlos Paul, according to her, says the inspiration for using the comic book theme on the album came from the fans, for "calling it powerful all the time." According to the singer herself, she did not intend to be directly involved in choosing the repertoire of the album, but decided to intervene when she received many tracks "elbow pain": "I asked for more joyful songs for the composers. positive", said Joelma, who, in addition to letters that speak of love, overcoming, brought feminine power to work. The album contains two Spanish language songs, "Pa'lante" and "Te Quiero", and the participation of their three children, Yago Mendes, Yasmin Mendes and Natália Sarraff in the song "O Amor de Deus". Joelma, the eponymous first album of singer, released on 29 of April, 2016, has reached the second position of the album chart of Pro-Música Brasil and stop "Brazil Albums charts" of Billboard.biz and received positive reviews, journalist Vinícius Cunha of Gshow, said that the record marks the overcoming after the tumultuous divorce with Ximbinha and the departure of Banda Calypso at the end of last year, is an open letter from a woman well resolved and willing to conquer the world once again. The song "Não Teve Amor", was released as the flagship of the album and became one of the most performed tracks on Brazilian radio stations in 2016 of the Regional category. "Debaixo do Mesmo Céu", composed by singer Marília Mendonça, was also released as work song from the album, along with a music video recorded at Castelo Eventos in Recife, Pernambuco which reached the top of the top-selling music videos on iTunes World. On September 9, released an EP in digital form with five remixed versions of "Não Teve Amor" and on September 30, released another EP digitally, entitled Assunto Delicado with four unreleased tracks would be present on DVD solo that would be recorded in November of that year, beating the top of the iTunes Store Brazil within 12 hours after its release.

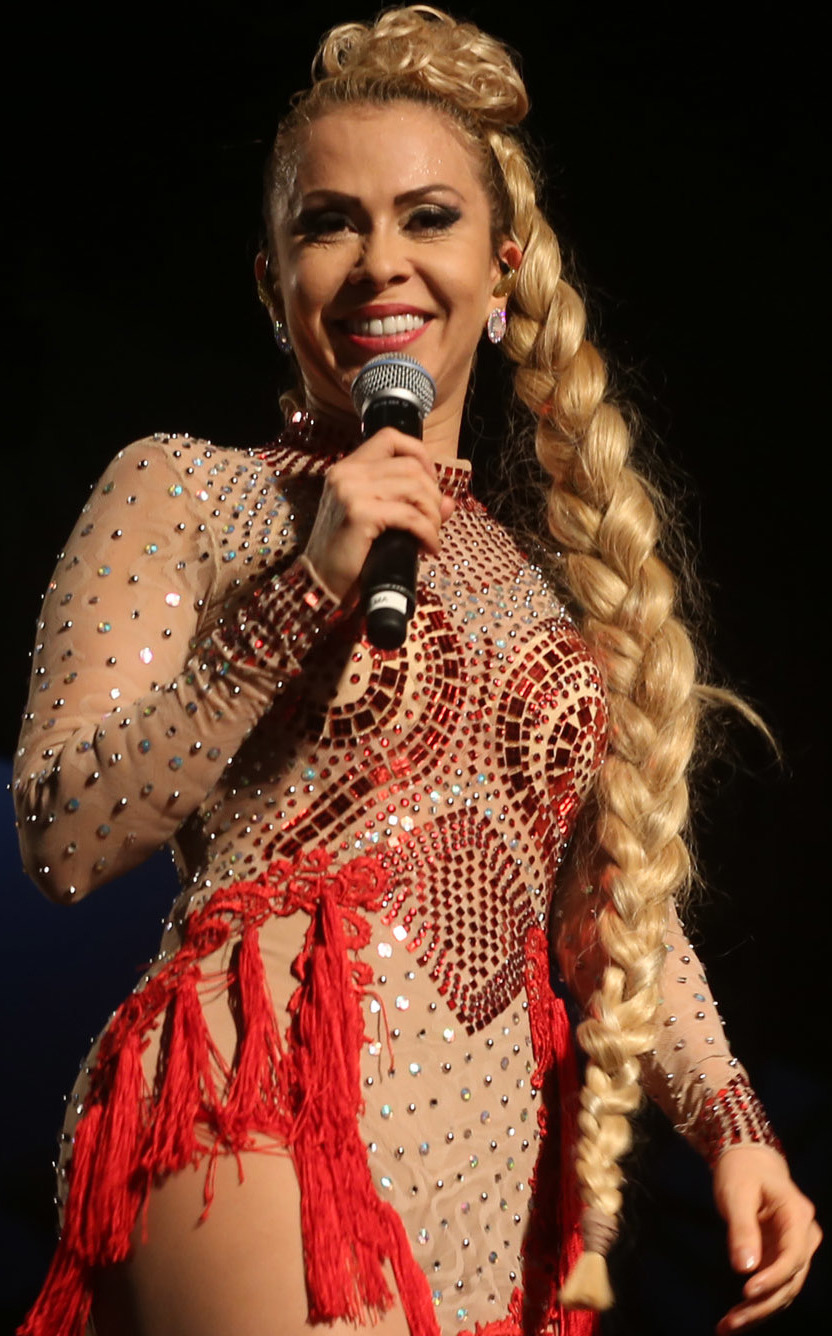
Joelma performing in 2019.

The singer's first solo tour, Avante Tour, began on March 18 of that same year. The series of shows gave rise to her first live album, Avante, recorded on November 9, 2016, in São Paulo. The tickets for the recording began to be sold in late August, running out in less than a week. The work had the participation of Ivete Sangalo, Solange Almeida and their three children: Yago, Yasmin and Natalia, and was released on April 28, 2017. In pre-order on April 6, the DVD soon became the best-selling product on Livraria Saraiva's website in less than 24 hours and contained an eponymous EP with four tracks from the album released on April 14 that less than 24 hours, has reached the top of iTunes Brazil. The personal life and professional career of Joelma are portrayed by fans and people close to her in the book Joelma: Entre Olhares, released in February 2017, the Shopping Cerrado in Goiânia, with an autograph session with the artist. The play was written by Jessyca Campos, a fan of the singer. The production process began with an online campaign supported by Joelma's social networks, whereby she asked fans in a video to send her stories with her to Jessyca. The singer followed the texts of her fan in a profile on Facebook and after her last performance at the head of the Banda Calypso came the idea of gathering the material in a book. "It was a small project, but in the course of my life with shaken periods, I was going to be able to do it," he said. work was gaining another form, adding some traces of biography.

In 8 of March 2018, on International Women's Day, Joelma launches the song "Perdeu a Razão" featuring the singer Marília Mendonça, and totally focused musical style for the sertanejo universitário, addressing violence against women. When recording the song, Joelma reports that she cried when she reached the chorus of the song, reminding her of her difficult childhood suffered by the domestic aggressions caused by her father: "This music reminds me of my childhood, that 10% of my childhood which was not good, so much so that when I went to put the voice in this song, I came precisely in that 10%, I would break down, I could not take it, I cried a lot. in the morning or 1 in the morning to get her clothes on, and she was going to sleep there at 3 in the morning and my father would arrive drunk and beat her up.", reports Joelma in an excerpt at the end of the music video. On April 5, she released a new version of the song " Se Vira Aí ", which brought a second duet version with the singer Zé Felipe. The song had been recorded and originally released in its solo release on its eponymous debut album in 2016.

== Personal life and family ==
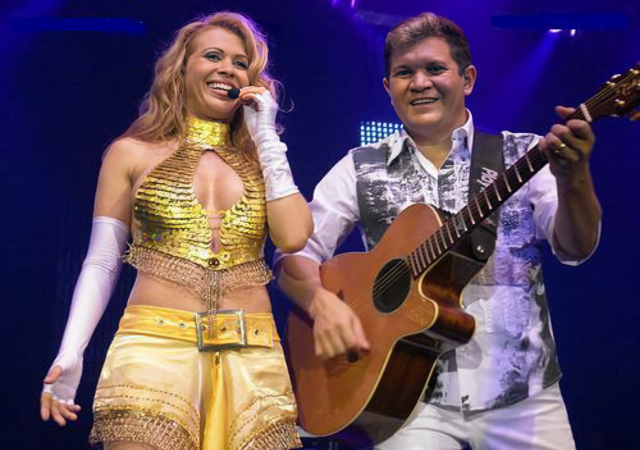
Joelma performing with her ex-husband in 2006.

In 2003, Joelma married the musician Cledivan Almeida Farias, known as Ximbinha after they had been together for five years. On October 26, 2009, Joelma and Ximbinha received the award of Citizen Pernambucano. The award was proposed by Deputy Nelson Pereira (PCdoB), who stated that "For several years as residents in Recife, via various projects related to music, Joelma and Ximbinha have contributed to the rich culture of Pernambuco". The 2nd Vice President of the management board, Deputy Antonio Moraes (PSDB), coordinated the ceremony and highlighted the importance of their music for the area.

On August 19, 2015, after 18 years of marriage, Joelma and Ximbinha announced their separation. On November 9, 2015, they signed the divorce.

Joelma has three children: Yago Matos Mendes da Silva (son of the lawyer and Alderman of the Camera Breves Robson Cristiano Leão Matos, born on December 8, 1995), Natália da Silva Mendes Sarraffi (daughter of Roberto Luís Sarraffi, Born on December 25, 1989), and Yasmin Mendes Farias (daughter of Ximbinha, born July 11, 2004). In February 2009 suffered a miscarriage.

=== Polemic ===
In 2013 the magazine Época published an article in which Joelma compared homosexuality with drug addiction. In the interview the singer had reportedly declared that if she had a gay son, she would "fight to the death" to make sure he became heterosexual again, and also compared homosexuality to the state of addiction. Banda Calypso's film project That's Calypso was reportedly canceled due to the strong backlash against her statements. Several celebrities spoke out against her comments, including Adriane Galisteu, and the actress Betty Faria, who posted: "The world is on the brink of a nuclear war [... and you're] worrying about healing gay [people]. Heal your souls." Days later, the band denied the film's release had been canceled, and distanced themselves from Joelma's statements: At no time the singer has compared homosexuality to drug addiction. What was reported were statements made to her friends and fans about the difficulty they feel, when they wish, to change their sexual orientation and that they, themselves, compared such difficulty [to] the difficulty of [being] chemically dependent. While [the] religion followed by Joelma [does] not support same-sex marriage, the singer respects and accepts the sexuality of all people, fans and friends, having no prejudice [against] religion, sex and color.

== Discography ==
Studio albums (CDs)

- Joelma (2016)

Live albums (CDs e DVDs)

- Avante (Ao Vivo São Paulo) (2017)

Extended plays (EPs)

- Joelma (2016)
- Não Teve Amor (Remixes) (2016)
- Assunto Delicado (2016)
- Avante (Ao Vivo em São Paulo) (2017)

Singles

- Debaixo do Mesmo Céu (2016)
- Amor Novo (2017)

== Tours ==
Officials

- Avante Tour (2016–present)

== Filmography ==
=== Television ===
Year	Title	As	Issuer
2007	Show do Tom	Herself	Episode: "March 18, 2007"
2008	A Turma do Didi	Herself	
2009	Toma Lá, Dá Cá	Herself	Episode: "July 28, 2009"
2010	Casseta e Planeta	Herself	Episode: "May 8, 2010"
2010	Aventuras do Didi	Herself	Episode: "July 18, 2010"
2011	Slaps & Kisses	Herself	Episode: April 5, 2011
2012	Sparkling Girls	Herself	Episode: "May 7, 2012"
2014	Domingo da Gente	Presenter	Episode: "March 2, 2014" (Season 7, episode 16)
2015	Show 50 Anos Globo	Special participation	Special commemorative of the 50 years of TV Globo
2017	Popstar	Guest judge	Episode: "August 27, 2017"
2017	Edge of Desire	Herself	Episode: "September 15, 2017"
2017	Adnight Show	Herself	Season 2 premiere

=== Web ===
Year	Title	As	Site/Social network
2011	Orkut Ao Vivo	Special guest	Orkut
2017	Fica, Vai Ter Live!	Special guest	Facebook

== Awards and nominations ==
=== With the Banda Calypso ===
Awards and nominations won in career with Banda Calypso.

Year	Award	Category	Nominee work	Result
2005	Melhores do Ano	Musical Revelation	Banda Calypso	Won
2006	Troféu Internet	Best Musical Ensemble	Banda Calypso	Won
2006	Latin Grammy Award	Best Brazilian Roots/Regional Album	Volume 8	Nominated
2006	Caldeirão do Huck	Best Musical Attraction of the Year	Banda Calypso	Won
2008	MTV Video Music Brasil	Band of Dreams Guitarist	Ximbinha	Won
2008	Troféu Destaque 2008 Nativa FM	Featured 2008	Banda Calypso	Won
2009	Latin Grammy Award	Best Brazilian Roots/Regional Album	Amor Sem Fim	Nominated
2009	Transformers Trip	Honorees 2009	Banda Calypso	Won
2010	Prêmio Jackson & Gonzagão	Best Dancers	Banda Calypso	Won
2010	Prêmio Jackson & Gonzagão	Best DVD	Ao Vivo Na Amazônia	Won
2010	Prêmio Jackson & Gonzagão	Best Singer	Joelma	Won
2010	Troféu Internet	Music of the Year	"Xonou, Xonou"	Won
2010	Troféu Imprensa	Music of the Year	"Xonou, Xonou"	Nominated
2010	Latin Grammy Awards	Best Brazilian Roots/Regional Album	10 Anos	Nominated
2011	Prêmio Extra de Televisão	Best Musical Theme	"Entre Tapas e Beijos"	Won
2012	Prêmio da Música Brasileira	Best Group of Popular Song	Banda Calypso	Won
2012	Troféu Internet	Best Musical Ensemble	Banda Calypso	Nominated
2012	Multishow Brazilian Music Award	Best Group	Banda Calypso	Nominated
2013	Troféu Internet	Music of the Year	"Me Beija Agora"	Nominated
2013	Troféu Imprensa	Music of the Year	"Me Beija Agora"	Nominated
2014	Troféu Internet	Best Singer	Joelma	Nominated
2015	Multishow Brazilian Music Award	Best Group	Banda Calypso	Nominated

=== As soloist ===
Awards and nominations won in solo career.

Year	Award	Category	Nominee work	Result
2016	Multishow Brazilian Music Award	Best Show	Tour Avante	Nominated
2016	Prêmio Globo de Programação	Best Regional Action Commercial	TV Liberal "Voando pro Pará"	Won
2017	Troféu Internet	Best Singer	Joelma	Won
2017	Troféu Internet	Music of the Year	"Não Teve Amor"	Nominated
2017	Troféu Imprensa	Best Singer	Joelma	Nominated
2017	Troféu Imprensa	Music of the Year	"Não Teve Amor"	Nominated
2017	Prêmio Festa Nacional da Música	Contribution to Brazilian Music	Joelma	Won
2017	Multishow Brazilian Music Award	Best Show	Tour Avante	Won
2017	Multishow Brazilian Music Award	Best Singer	Joelma	Nominated
2017	Prêmio Vulque	Best Singer of the Year	Joelma	Won
2018	Troféu Internet	Best Singer	Joelma	Pending
2018	Troféu Internet	Music of the Year	"Amor Novo"	Pending
