= Norton (band) =

Portuguese rock band

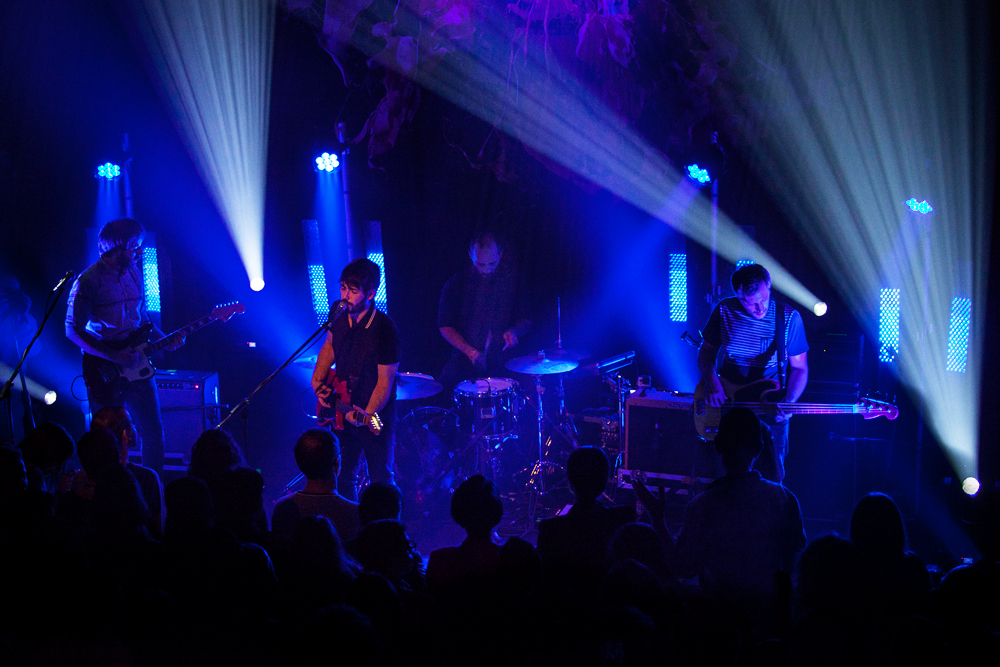
- Live in Lisbon – 2014

Background information
- Origin: Castelo Branco, Portugal
- Genres: Indie, pop, alternative rock
- Years active: 2002–present
- Labels: Skud & Smarty Records, This Time Records
- Members: Pedro Afonso; Rodolfo Matos; Leonel Soares; Manuel Simões
- Past members: Alexandre Rodrigues; Carlos Nunes
- Website: wearenorton.com

Norton is an indie rock band formed in Castelo Branco, Portugal. They have released five albums to date and toured all over Europe and Japan.

== History ==
=== 2003: Make Me Sound E.P. ===
In April 2003 the EP 'Make Me Sound was released and it is considered one of the records of the year by the local music press, in Portugal.

Blue Song is part of the compilation "007" released by the Portuguese label Bor Land and the song Summer Beat is part of Rock Sound Magazine – Portuguese Edition – CD Sample.

=== 2004–06: Pictures From Our Thoughts ===
In May 2004 they released their debut album Pictures From Our Thoughts.

The first single, Swirling Sound, is part of the compilation Super Castelo Branco, Summer Beat (Autumn Version) is part of Losing Today Magazine – Italy – CD Sample and Chocolate enters in the O.S.T. of the snowskate movie Adieu - Norway, and also of the compilation Can Take You Anywhere You Want.

The record had Rita Redshoes and Ricardo Coelho (Loto) as special guests.

In 2005 they invited some Portuguese artists to remix the songs of the debut album. Frames > Remixes & Versions has remixes by Nuno Gonçalves (The Gift), Loto, Rui Maia (X-Wife / Mirror People), Kubik and many more. The record has also four acoustic songs, recorded for the radio show 3 Pistas from Antena 3 – Radio Station. Between those songs appears a version of The Velvet Underground's song Sunday Morning.

In October of that year they present, exclusively, the show Norton Plays Indie Rock on Film. Produced especially for Imago Film Festival, the band versioned songs that are part of various movies.

=== 2007–10: Kersche ===
In March 2007 Norton released their second album, Kersche, which took them to a big tour around Spain.

The year after the record was released in Japan and features exclusive remixes by Roger O'Donnell (The Cure), Jaguar and Leander.

In the same year artists from all around the globe remixed the songs of the record in Kersche Remixed. FM Belfast (Iceland), Lost Room (Sweden), Muxuu (Malaysia), Corwood Manual (Germany), Cars & Trains (US) are some of the guests.

In February 2009 they released a version of Technotronic's hit single Pump Up the Jam.

In December of the same year they made their first European tour, where they visited Spain, Germany, Netherlands, Luxembourg and France.

In 2010 they released Make It Last, an exclusive song made especially for the Portuguese movie "Um Funeral à Chuva", directed by Telmo Martins.

=== 2011–13: Layers of Love United ===
In March 2011 their third record came out. Layers of Love United includes the hit single Two Points, the song with most airplay in Antena 3 Radio Station during that year.

The Japanese version of the album was released in June and has three acoustic bonus tracks. One of them is Paris, by the British band Friendly Fires.

In 2012 Layers of Love United was released on limited edition, numbered, white vinyl, which also has the Paris version as a bonus track.

In the same year Norton released the song "Charlie", as an advance single for the compilation Teenagers From Outer Space Comeback – a tribute to Bee Keeper, and the E.P. Live Acoustic, which has six songs from Layers of Love United played live acoustic, in a showcase, in Lisbon, Portugal.

=== 2014–2017: Norton (album) ===
In March 2014 Norton was released in CD and in red vinyl, simultaneously with a Japanese edition. The presentation single of the record is Magnets, which was one of the most played songs in Portuguese radio stations that year. Brava and Drifting Ballet were the other singles of the album.

In the beginning of 2015 they made a version of Lady (Hear Me Tonight), by the French duo Modjo. The version was an invitation by Antena 3 Radio Station to help celebrate their 20th anniversary.

In December of the same year they made their first Japanese tour, where they were headliners in Spin. Discovery Festival, in Tokyo.

In December 2017 the band closed the 2014 album tour with a concert at Centro Cultural de Belém in Lisbon, Portugal

In 2016 the band began working on their fifth record.

=== 2019–Present: Heavy Light ===
On 4 October 2019 the band released their comeback single "Changes". The video for the song features the russian longboarder Valeriya Gogunskaya.

On 22 January 2020 the band announced that the new album will be called Heavy Light. On the same day they released 'Passengers', the second single from the record. The song was presented with a video with footage from their Japanese tour.

On 11 March 2020, '1997' the third single from the album was released.

Heavy Light was released on 3 July 2020 and nearly all of the shows of the live tour were cancelled or postponed due to the COVID-19 pandemic.

On 2 July 2021 the band released a new remix made by Peter Kember / Sonic Boom, producer of bands like MGMT, Beach House or Panda Bear. The song is called "Galaxies - New Atlantis".

In October they released the new single "Young Blood (Daylight)" featuring Filipa Leão, on vocals.

On November 4 of the same year, they were announced as one of the 16 composers invited by RTP to write a song for Festival da Canção 2022, and in January 2022 they released the single "Hope" - the song they presented at the Festival and which had a great critical reaction. [50]

In October 2023, the song "Young Blood (Daylight)" is published in the compilation - Super Castelo Branco - Volume II.

== Discography ==
=== Studio albums ===
- 2004 – Pictures From Our Thoughts (CD)
- 2007 – Kersche (CD – Digipack)
- 2008 – Kersche (CD – Japanese Edition)
- 2011 – Layers of Love United (CD)
- 2011 – Layers of Love United (CD – Japanese Edition)
- 2012 – Layers of Love United (vinyl)
- 2014 – Norton (CD – Digipack)
- 2014 – Norton (CD – Japanese Edition)
- 2014 – Norton (Vinyl)
- 2020 – Heavy Light (CD)
- 2020 – Heavy Light (vinyl gatefold)

=== Remix albums ===
- 2005 – Frames > Remixes & Versions (CD)
- 2008 – Kersche Remixed

=== Singles and EP's ===
- 2003 – Make Me Sound (E.P)
- 2003 – Summer Beat
- 2004 – Swirling Sound
- 2007 – Cinnamon & Wine
- 2007 – Still Stays On
- 2009 – Pump Up The Jam
- 2010 – Make It Last
- 2011 – Two Points
- 2011 – Coastline
- 2012 – Glowing Suite
- 2012 – Layers
- 2012 – Charlie
- 2012 – Live Acoustic (E.P.)
- 2014 – Magnets
- 2014 – Brava
- 2014 – Drifting Ballet
- 2015 – Lady (Hear Me Tonight)
- 2019 – Changes
- 2020 – Passengers
- 2020 – 1997
- 2020 – Madrugada
- 2021 – Galaxies - New Atlantis (Sonic Boom Remix)
- 2021 – Young Blood (Daylight) ft. Filipa Leão
- 2022 – Hope

=== Compilations ===
- 2003 – 007 (CD – Bor Land)
- 2003 – Rock Sound Magazine (CD – Rock Sound)
- 2005 – Losing Today Magazine (CD – Losing Today – Italy)
- 2005 – Super Castelo Branco (CD – Skud & Smarty Records)
- 2005 – Adieu – Snowskate Movie (DVD – Switchfilms – Norway)
- 2005 – Can Take You Anywhere You Want (CD – Bor Land)
- 2007 – Novo Rock Português (CD – Farol Música)
- 2012 – Indiegente (2xCD & 2xVinil – Raging Planet)
- 2012 – Dancin' Days (CD – Universal Music)
- 2012 – Teenagers From Outer Space Comeback (Vinyl – Skud & Smarty Records)
- 2022 – Festival da Canção 2022 (CD / Digital – Universal Music)
- 2023 – Super Castelo Branco - Volume II (CD / Digital – Skud & Smarty Records)
