= Pongo (musician) =

Angolan-Portuguese singer

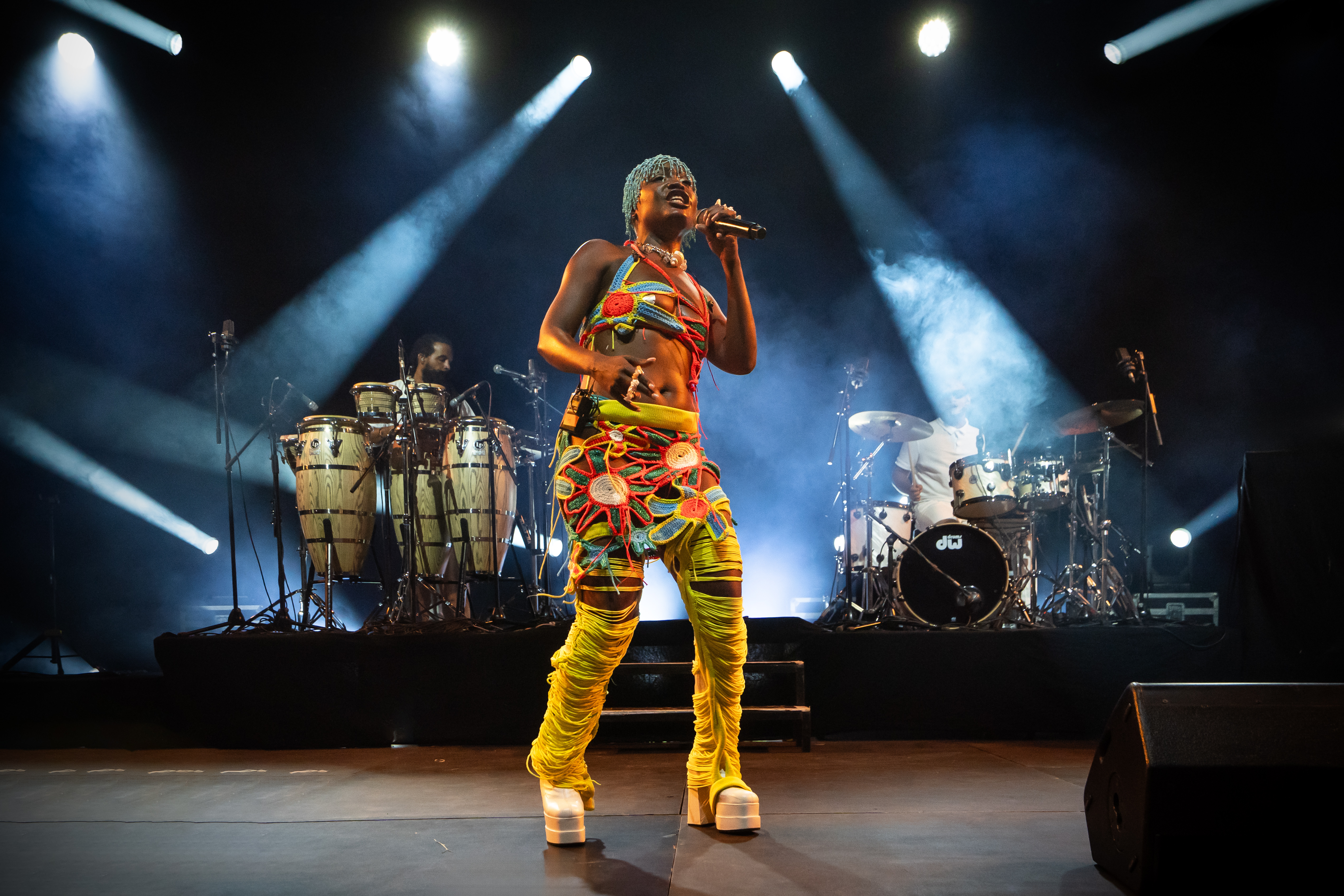
- Pongo in 2025

Background information
- Also known as: Pongolove
- Born: Engracia Domingos da Silva; 10 April 1992 (age 34); Luanda, Angola
- Origin: Lisbon, Portugal
- Genres: Pop; Kuduro; Progressive Kuduro
- Occupations: Singer; songwriter
- Years active: 2008–present

Engracia Domingos da Silva (born 10 April 1992), known professionally as Pongo, is an Angolan and Portuguese singer and songwriter.

== Early life ==
Born in Luanda, Angola, Pongo immigrated with her family to Lisbon, Portugal, escaping from the Angolan civil war. In the new country, her mother worked as a maid and her father worked as a construction laborer. She lived in a shelter room for five years with the other four members of her family, sharing a bed with her two sisters.

Her father was very strict and wouldn't let Pongo and her sisters have a social life. Finding it hard to endure these difficulties, at 12 years old she threw herself from the seventh floor of the building where she lived, sustaining injuries and breaking a leg. During the initial phases of her recovery, she couldn't walk and her father nicknamed her M'Pongo Love, after the name of a Congolese singer very well known in Angola who had endured a period where she couldn't walk because of an unsuccessful polio treatment.

On her way to one of the physical therapy sessions across the city, in a neighborhood with African immigrants, Pongo saw for the first time the kuduro group Denon Squad performing on the street. After her recovery, she started dancing with the group and singing rap. She adopted the stage name Pongolove, later abbreviated to Pongo.

== Career ==
Pongo's participation in Denon Squad led her to meet Buraka Som Sistema. She performed on a stage for the first time with them in 2008 in the Music Box concert venue in Lisbon. In the same year, she became known in Portugal for the song "Kalemba (Wegue Wegue)", written and recorded by her. This song was part of the soundtracks of the games Need for Speed: Shift and FIFA 10, and was extensively played on YouTube, with over ten million views.

Pongo performed with Buraka Som Sistema for two years, then left the group over disputes relating to royalties of the song "Kalemba (Wegue Wegue)". To help raise her sisters, Pongo worked in menial jobs after her father abandoned the family. One day, while working as a housecleaner, she heard "Wegue Wegue" playing on the radio and then decided to return to focusing on her career.

Pongo's career recovery was accelerated in 2018 by the launch of her first EP, "Baia", and in 2019 by her participation in the French festival Fête de la musique, performing in the Élysée, the official residence of the French presidency, being hosted by Emmanuel Macron, when she became known as the "Diva of Kuduro". In 2020, she launched her second EP, "Uwa" (a word that means "step" in Kimbundo, one of Angola's official languages). In 2020, Pongo won the Music Moves Europe Talent Award.

== Discography ==
=== Albums ===
Albums
Year	Details	Ref.
2018	Baia: Launched: September 21, 2018	
2020	Uwa: Launched: February 7, 2020	
2022	Sakidila: Launched: April 1, 2022	
