= Heavy Light (Norton album) =

Studio album by Norton
- Released: 3 July 2020
- Studio: Golden Pony & Namouche, Lisbon, Portugal; Mértola
- Label: Skud & Smarty

Norton chronology
Norton (2014)	Heavy Light (2020)

Singles from Heavy Light
- 1. "Changes" Released: 4 October 2019; 2. "Passengers" Released: 22 January 2020; 3. "1997" Released: 11 March 2020; 4. "Madrugada" Released: 26 June 2020

Heavy Light is the fifth studio album by Portuguese musical project Norton. It was announced on 22 January 2020 and three singles were already released ahead of the album, "Changes", "Passengers" and "1997".

It follows the 2014 album Norton, and will be released on vinyl, CD, cassette and digitally.

The album was due to be released on 27 March 2020, but on 17 March the band announced the album release date would be postponed due to the ongoing coronavirus pandemic.

'Heavy Light' was released on 3 July 2020, on vinyl, cd, cassette and digital

== Track listing ==
Heavy Light track listing
No.	Title	Length
1.	"Changes"	4:04
2.	"Passengers"	4:27
3.	"Young Blood"	3:51
4.	"Madrugada"	4:42
5.	"Galaxies"	4:28
6.	"1997"	3:54
7.	"Shibuya"	3:31
8.	"Tango"	4:12
9.	"Save My Soul"	5:06
10.	"Seated" (bonus track exclusive on the vinyl version)	4:41
Total length:		40:96

== See also ==
- List of 2020 albums
