= Os Azeitonas =

Portuguese band

- Origin: Porto, Portugal
- Genres: Pop rock, power pop, pop
- Years active: 2002–present
- Labels: Maria Records, Pompa & Circunstância (Pomp & Circumstance) (2005-2012); EMI Music Portugal / Parlophone (2013–the present)
- Members: Marlon (Mário Brandão); Nena (Luísa Barbosa); Salsa (João Salcedo)
- Past members: Miguel A.J. (Miguel Araújo), Bárbara Cáius, Daniela Maia
- Website: www.osazeitonas.com

Os Azeitonas are a Portuguese pop rock band from Porto, formed in 2002. Having gone through various formations - a five-member "garage-boysband", a four-member pop-rock group - now as a trio, with members Mario Brandão "Marlon" (vocals), Luísa Barbosa "Nena" (vocals) and João Salcedo "Salsa" (vocals and keyboard), the group has released five full-length albums and two DVDs.

The band is known for their successful singles "Quem És Tu Miúda," "Anda Comigo Ver os Aviões," "Café Hollywood," "Ray-Dee-Oh" and "Tonto de Ti". The fifth album, AZ, was released on July 8, 2018, by Parlophone, EMI Music Portugal's successor. The band has been nominated for two awards for Best Portuguese Act of MTV Europe Music Awards.

== History ==
With origins dating back to 2002, a time when it was just a joke between friends, the band was inspired by Rui Veloso. In 2005, with production of Maria Records, owned by the renowned singer and northerner composer, came the first album. The somewhat muddled album was launched in July 2005 by the Maria Records. Released in August 2006 only online, the single "Silvia Alberto" remained some weeks on the top downloads list. Other songs such as "Queixa ao Pai Natal" ("Complaint to Santa Claus") (Christmas 2006) and "Queixa a Cupido" ("Complaint to the Cupid") (February 2007) appeared on the same album.

In December 2007 they reissued Radio Alegria, which was distributed in the form of a book including a CD. On this album are some of the most famous tracks by Os Azeitonas, such as "Quem és tu Miúda," "Nos Desenhos Animados (Nunca Acaba Mal)" or "Mulheres Nuas."

After the launch of two albums (in physical and digital format), by Maria Records, they edited the work Salão América for free download on their website. This piece contained the successful "Anda Comigo Ver os Aviões", "Café Hollywood" and "Dança, Menina Dança". In 2011 the DVD "Em Boa Companhia Eu Vou", which was recorded live in December 2010, is released. It accompanied the release of a first edition CD of the album Salão América. In 2012, the album reached the second place in top sales in Portugal.

The song "Anda Comigo Ver os Aviões" became a big hit after being sung on an idols competition show. It was also parodied by Vasco Palmeirim of the morning show Rádio Comercial in a satire of Pingo Doce called "Anda comigo ver as promoções" ("Come with me to see the deals").

In May 2012, Miguel Araújo, who uses the artistic name Miguel AJ when performing with os Azeitonas, released his first solo album.

In April 2013 the official fan group, called Os Azeitolas, was created. Currently the group can only be found as a Facebook page.

The group was nominated for Best Portuguese Act on the 2012 MTV Europe Music Awards, a title won by the singer Aurea.

In the 2016/17 New Year's Eve concert in Porto, the band announced that it was Miguel AJ's last performance, as he was leaving the band amicably to pursue a solo career.

Their most recent album "Reconstrução" was released in Fall 2022.

== Discography ==
=== Studio albums ===
- Um Tanto ou Quanto Atarantado (2005)
- Rádio Alegria (2007)
- Salão América (2009)
- Em Boa Companhia Eu Vou (2011)
- AZ (2013)
- Banda Sonora (2019)
- Reconstrução (2022)

=== Videography ===
- Em Boa Companhia Eu Vou (2011)
- Serviço Ocasional (2015)
