= Saudade, saudade =

2022 song by Maro

- Live version cover

Single by Maro
- Language: English; Portuguese
- Released: 21 January 2022
- Genre: Indie pop
- Length: 3:01
- Label: Universal
- Songwriter: Mariana Secca
- Producers: Maro; John Blanda

Music video
- "Saudade, saudade" on YouTube

Eurovision Song Contest 2022 entry
- Country: Portugal
- Artist: Maro
- Composers: Mariana Secca; John Blanda
- Lyricist: Mariana Secca

Finals performance
- Semi-final result: 4th
- Semi-final points: 208
- Final result: 9th
- Final points: 207

Entry chronology
- ◄ "Love Is on My Side" (2021)
- "Ai Coração" (2023) ►

Official performance video
- "Saudade, Saudade" (First Semi-Final) on YouTube "Saudade, Saudade" (Grand Final) on YouTube

"Saudade, saudade" (European Portuguese pronunciation: [sɐwˈðaðɨ sɐwˈðaðɨ]) is a song recorded by Portuguese singer Maro. She collaborated on the song with American musician John Blanda. It was released for digital download and streaming on 21 January 2022 via Universal Music.

It is an indie pop track with the lyrical theme of saudade. The song became commercially successful on home soil, peaking inside the top 5.

"Saudade, saudade" represented Portugal in the Eurovision Song Contest 2022 in Turin, Italy. The song finished in ninth place with 207 points. Maro performed on stage B accompanied by five backing vocalists forming a circle in a dark setting.

== Background and release ==
"It's about loss, but it's also celebration. It's crazy how impactful our grandparents can be, and how it's a reference to so many values, including unconditional love. Music is what gets us closest to that connection."

— Maro

"Saudade, saudade" was one of the 20 songs that competed in Festival da Canção 2022, Portugal's national selection for the Eurovision Song Contest 2022. Maro was one of the songwriters invited by Rádio e Televisão de Portugal (RTP). The composers both created the song and selected the performer for their entry. Maro decided to be the performer due to the song's personal nature: "[it] is about and for my grandfather who unfortunately is no longer with us, but who continues to be an essential part of me and who is and always will be greatly missed. That is why, I thought it would not make sense not to sing such a personal song." Maro and American musician John Blanda, one of her best friends, composed the song during a trip to Brazil. The whole song originated from a Blanda's guitar riff. Maro thought it was beautiful and wanted to use it. She then wrote the lyrics over the melody.

"Saudade, saudade" was released for digital download and streaming as part of the Festival da Canção 2022 compilation album on 21 January 2022 via Universal Music. A piano-driven version titled "Saudade, saudade (Live in Studio)" was released on 7 March 2022.

== Composition ==
Maro collaborated on "Saudade, saudade" with John Blanda. It is an indie pop track with a length of three minutes and one second (3:01) that moves at a tempo of 83 beats per minute. It is composed in the key of B♭ minor and written in triple metre. With background vocals, the song has an instrumentation consisting of strings, percussion and clapping. The track is influenced by Spanish flamenco, in addition to African and Brazilian music. The song's lyrical theme is saudade, a Portuguese word with no direct English translation. Dictionary.com defines saudade as a "deep emotional state of melancholic longing for a person or thing that is absent". The character in the song focuses on the uniqueness of the word to express her true feelings: "Saudade / Saudade / Nothing more that I can say / Says it in a better way".

== Commercial performance ==
"Saudade, saudade" entered the Portuguese singles chart at number 176, before moving up to number 4. The track debuted at number 3 on Billboard's Portugal Songs chart.

== Live performances ==
On 16 February 2022, Maro uploaded to her YouTube channel an acoustic version recorded in Avinyó, Spain. Maro appeared on radio station RFM on 17 March, singing a portion of the song during the interview. On 29 April 2022, the third episode of Eurovision House Party 2022 featuring Maro premiered, and her stand-alone performance became available on 5 May of that year. On 7 May 2022, Maro's interview and performance became available on radio station TSF's website. On the same day, Maro's Wiwi Jam at Home acoustic performance was uploaded to Wiwibloggs' YouTube channel.

== Eurovision Song Contest ==
=== Festival da Canção 2022 ===
On 4 November 2021, Maro was announced as a participating songwriter of Festival da Canção 2022, Portugal's national selection for the Eurovision Song Contest 2022. On 21 January 2022, Maro was announced to be performing her song, titled "Saudade, saudade". She competed in the first semi-final on 5 March 2022, placing first with 22 points after winning the jury vote and coming second in the televote. In the final, held on 12 March of that year, she won both the jury vote and the televote, placing first overall with 24 points, becoming the Portuguese representative at the Eurovision Song Contest 2022.

=== At Eurovision ===
The Eurovision Song Contest 2022 took place at the PalaOlimpico in Turin, Italy, and consisted of two semi-finals on 10 and 12 May, followed by the final on 14 May 2022. Portugal was placed into the first semi-final, to be held on 10 May 2022, and was scheduled to perform in the second half of the show. Portugal performed in position ten, following the entry from Moldova and preceding the entry from Croatia. For the grand final, Portugal was drawn to compete in the first half. Portugal was subsequently placed to perform in position 3, following the entry from Romania and before the entry from Finland.

Maro wore an outfit with a gradient color scheme and performed on stage B accompanied by five backing vocalists forming a circle in a dark setting. During the performance, the background LED screens displayed the word saudade.

== Cover version ==
In early May 2025, coinciding with that year's edition of Eurovision, Marina Satti, who represented Greece in the 2024 edition of the contest, recorded and released a Greek version of the song, titled Φοβάμαι [Fovame] (in English: I'm Afraid), for streaming platforms only. It's part of the Spotify Singles releases.

== Track listings ==
- Digital download / streaming
1. "Saudade, saudade" – 3:01
- Live in studio
1. "Saudade, saudade (Live in Studio)" – 3:10

== Credits and personnel ==
- Maro – lead vocals, production, songwriting
- John Blanda – production
- Alan Silverman – mastering
- Pedro Calloni – mixing

== Charts ==
Chart performance for "Saudade, saudade"
Chart (2022)	Peak position
Iceland (Tónlistinn)	13
Ireland (IRMA)	93
Lithuania (AGATA)	3
Netherlands (Single Tip)	6
Portugal (AFP)	3
Sweden (Sverigetopplistan)	68
Switzerland (Schweizer Hitparade)	79
UK Singles Downloads (Official Charts)	51

== Certifications ==
Certifications and sales for "Saudade, saudade"
Region	Certification	Certified units/sales
Portugal (AFP)	Gold	5,000^{‡}
^{‡} Sales+streaming figures based on certification alone.

== Release history ==
Release history and formats for "Saudade, saudade"
Region	Date	Format	Version	Label	Ref.
Various	21 January 2022	Digital download; streaming	Single	Universal Music	
Various	7 March 2022	Digital download; streaming	Live	Secca & Co.; Venice Music	
