= Assunto Delicado =

- Cover of the second EP Joelma on his solo career.

EP by Joelma
- Released: September 30, 2016
- Recorded: 2016
- Genre: Brega Pop; Calypso
- Length: 12:38
- Label: Universal Music Group
- Producer: Joelma; Tovinho; Digital Download

Joelma chronology
| Joelma (2016) | Assunto Delicado (2016) |

Assunto Delicado (Delicate Subject) is the Second extended play (EP) of the Brazilian singer Joelma, released on September 30, 2016, under the seal of Universal Music Group only digital download in iTunes Store. The name of the work is the same one of its tracks, "Assunto Delicado", composition of Marília Mendonça, Maraisa and Juliano Tchula. With four previously unreleased tracks, the EP is a complement to the recording of the singer's first solo career DVD, recorded the following month.

== Background ==
In an interview for the site UOL In May 2016, Joelma said she would like to have included more tracks of carimbó on her debut album, but that could not due to the short time it took to finalize the album. The singer said that she was working on some unpublished songs and promised that in her future DVD would have an unpublished carimbó that was left out of the album. The carimbó in question is the song "Menina do Requebrado" present in the EP.

Joelma sends a message to the SP no Ar in September 2016, already anticipating the news:

"Hi folks of the São Paulo no Ar! I have news for you: I'm releasing my second EP with four new songs that will come into my DVD, which will be recorded here in São Paulo on November 9 [...]".

In 12 hours, the EP reached the third position among the most downloaded in iTunes Brazil.

== Track listing ==
| No. | Title | Writer(s) | Length |
|---|---|---|---|
| 1. | "Assunto Delicado" | | 3:27 |
| 2. | "#Partiu" | Zel Moreira; Cecilio Nena | 3:11 |
| 3. | "Menina do Requebrado" | Louro Santos; Veneci Moreno | 3:01 |
| 4. | "Mulher Não Chora" | | 2:56 |
| Total length: | | | 12:35 |
