= Love Is on My Side =

2021 song by The Black Mamba

Single by the Black Mamba
- Released: 7 March 2021
- Length: 2:55
- Label: Self-released
- Songwriter: Tatanka

The Black Mamba singles chronology
"Beautiful Lie" (2020)	"Love Is on My Side" (2021)

Music video
- "Love Is on My Side" on YouTube

Eurovision Song Contest 2021 entry
- Country: Portugal
- Artist: The Black Mamba
- Language: English
- Composer: Pedro Tatanka Taborda
- Lyricist: Pedro Tatanka Taborda

Finals performance
- Semi-final result: 4th
- Semi-final points: 239
- Final result: 12th
- Final points: 153

Entry chronology
- ◄ "Medo de sentir" (2020)
- "Saudade, saudade" (2022) ►

Official performance video
- "Love Is on My Side" (Second Semi-Final) on YouTube "Love Is on My Side" (Grand Final) on YouTube

"Love Is on My Side" is a song by Portuguese soul band the Black Mamba that represented Portugal in the Eurovision Song Contest 2021. It was written by the lead vocalist of the band, Pedro Tatanka, and is the first Portuguese entry in the contest to be performed entirely in English.

== Background ==
The song is about a sex worker that the band met during a trip to Amsterdam in 2019. The song is sung from the woman's perspective. In the beginning, she is young and full of hope. But, things didn't turn out as planned and she would end up using drugs and going into prostitution. However, despite the hardships, she still retains some of her youth.

== Eurovision Song Contest ==
The song was selected to represent Portugal in the Eurovision Song Contest 2021, after winning Festival da Canção, the music competition that selects Portugal's entries for the Eurovision Song Contest. The semi-finals of the 2021 contest featured the same line-up of countries as determined by the draw for the 2020 contest's semi-finals. Portugal was placed into the second semi-final, held on 20 May 2021, from which they qualified in 4th place. In the grand final, held on 22 May 2021, the song was performed 7th in the running order and came 12th with 153 points.

== Charts ==
Chart performance for "Love Is on My Side"
Chart (2021)	Peak position
Iceland (RÚV)	17
Lithuania (AGATA)	46
Netherlands (Single Top 100)	70
Portugal (AFP)	44
Sweden Heatseeker (Sverigetopplistan)	5
UK Singles Downloads (Official Charts)	55
