= Não Teve Amor =

Single by Joelma

from the album Joelma
- Released: January 28, 2016
- Recorded: 2015
- Genre: Calipso; Forró
- Length: 3:12
- Label: Universal Music Group
- Songwriters: Marília Mendonça; Juliano Tchula; Rangel Castro

Joelma singles chronology
""Ai Coração""	"Não Teve Amor"	""Debaixo do Mesmo Céu""

"Não Teve Amor" (English: "Did Not Have Love") is a song released by the singer Joelma, present in their first album Joelma. It was released as the third single album and composed of Marília Mendonça, Juliano Tchula and Rangel Castro. On January 28, 2016 the song was made available for download on the social networks of the singer, a week after "Ai Coração" to be released.

== Composition and release ==
The release of the song was so thunderous that broadcasters and websites commented that the letter could be interpreted as a message to her ex-husband, "There are things in life that we do not lose, we are free".

Asked about the letter during an interview for the radio FM O Dia, Joelma claims that the letter could be interpreted in various ways and talking about getting rid of the bad things in general: a false friend, a bad job, etc.

Due to the success in the media, the song became the first official work of music, instead of "Ai Coração".

A Remix EP was released on all digital platforms on September 9, 2016.

== Track listing ==
=== Não Teve Amor (Remixes) - EP ===
No.	Title	Writer(s)	Length
1.	"Não Teve Amor (Brabo Remix)"	Marília Mendonça; Juliano Tchula; Rangel Castro	3:33
2.	"Não Teve Amor (Pedro Sampaio Remix)"	Marília Mendonça; Juliano Tchula; Rangel Castro	2:57
3.	"Não Teve Amor (P. Dash Remix)"	Marília Mendonça; Juliano Tchula; Rangel Castro	2:37
4.	"Não Teve Amor (D-POP Remix)"	Marília Mendonça; Juliano Tchula; Rangel Castro	3:12
5.	"Não Teve Amor (DKVPZ Remix)"	Marília Mendonça; Juliano Tchula; Rangel Castro	3:27
Total length:			15:46

== Videoclip ==
Along with the release of the song, a surprise for fans: a clip. In this clip, Joelma shows a beautiful and simple interpretation in the studio with the band. Currently the clip already hit the berreira over 2 Million Views.

== Certifications ==
Region	Certification	Certified units/sales
Brazil (Pro-Música Brasil)	Platinum	100,000^{‡}
^{‡} Sales+streaming figures based on certification alone.
