= Joelma (album) =

Studio album by Joelma
- Released: April 29, 2016
- Recorded: 2015–2016
- Length: 47:41
- Label: Universal Music Group
- Producers: Joelma; Tovinho

Singles from Joelma
- 1. "Voando pro Pará" Released: December 9, 2015; 2. "Ai Coração" Released: January 21, 2016; 3. "Não Teve Amor" Released: January 28, 2016; 4. "Debaixo do Mesmo Céu" Released: July 8, 2016; 5. "Pa'Lante" Released: August 12, 2016

Joelma is the debut solo album of Brazilian singer Joelma Mendes, initially under the stage name Joelma Calypso and later simply as Joelma. It was released on April 29, 2016, by Universal Music. The album features 14 songs, including 4 tracks from the EP Joelma released digitally in March 2016, a cover of "Barca Furada" by Banda Calypso (her former band for 15 years) and 9 previously unreleased tracks.

The singer composed the music and lyrics for the song "Tua Face". She executive produced the album while sharing musical direction with experienced producer and arranger Tovinho. Her children Nathália, Yago and Yasmin, are featured in the track "O Amor de Deus", composed by Michael Sullivan.

The singles chosen to promote the album were "Voando Pro Pará", "Não Teve Amor" and "Ai Coração". The album was available for pre-sale at Saraiva's website on April 14, 2016.

== Background ==
After her separation from ex-husband Ximbinha, Joelma announced in Programa da Sabrina on August 29, 2015, that she would leave Banda Calypso in December to pursue a solo career, acknowledging that this would be a challenge.

This was confirmed by her press office, which indicated that she would be known artistically as Joelma Calypso. There followed speculation that she could follow a gospel music career, but she made it clear that she intended to continue working with the calipso rhythm she was known for. In a show held in Goiânia, on August 28, the singer thanked her fans for their support and confirmed that she was leaving Banda Calypso on December 31, to then "serve God" singing calypso rhythm.

After the controversial divorce, signed in Recife, Joelma began her solo career. In October 2015 she recorded "Amor de Fâ" with the band Musa and participated in the music video.

== Production ==
Joelma said the main difference she noticed in her career was having to take the reins of everything: "I was accommodated, everyone was directing my work and my life. Now, a Jolema was reborn that had been there from the beginning. I was surprised with myself".

Acceptance of the fans was a surprise to the singer. "99% of Calypso's fan clubs migrated to Joelma. It was a very good surprise [...] it lifted me up faster and made me forget the past." The dance and technical team of Banda Calypso also followed Joelma, who said their support was essential on her solo career.

The album features the song "O Amor de Deus," where she sings with her children, Nathália, Yago and Yasmin:

It was wonderful record with them. At home everybody sings and everybody plays. Yasmin plays guitar, plays the piano and sings. Yago also plays and sings, Natalia just sings. So we had this idea and it was exciting [...] it was a real gift for me.

During the program É do Pará, live in Belém on November 21, 2015, Joelma sang a snippet of a new song that was to be included on the album. When asked about the song the following year on "FM O Dia", Joelma said she had not recorded the song as the music did not work in the studio.

=== Spanish tracks ===
Jolema recorded two tracks in Spanish to better appeal to an international audience, "Pa'Lante" and "Te Quiero". Her former band, Banda Calypso, had recorded for a Spanish-language album as early as 2009, but the project had been delayed several times and was ultimately shelved with Joelma's separation from Ximbinha and the breakup of the group.

In October 2015, the two Spanish-language songs leaked on the Internet. The songs were to be launched in January 2016, after the end of her commitments to Banda Calypso. It is not known if the two songs were from Banda Calypso's cancelled Spanish-language album or composed especially for Joelma's solo career, though the singer stated there were no legal impediments.

== Release ==
The singer had plans to release the album in January 2016, along with clips from "Pa'lante" and "Te Quiero", but was delayed due to her contract with Universal Music Group. She signed with the label on March 8, 2016, officially launching her solo career. The initial single releases were under the stage name Joelma Calypso, but she later chose to simplify this as Joelma.

=== Singles ===
"Voando pro Pará" was released months before any announcement of the CD or EP. In early December 2015, the demo version of the song leaked on the Internet. The official version was launched on the singer's Facebook page a week later, on December 9, 2015, and in four hours had already been heard by over 22 thousand people. The song pays homage to Joelma's home state and a special video for "Voando Pro Pará" was produced and aired by TV Liberal, an affiliate of Rede Globo in Pará, in celebration of the 400-year anniversary of Belém.

"Ai Coração" was released on January 21, 2016, on the social networks of the singer, then using the stage name Joelma Calypso. During the launch, it was the 8th-most tweeted tag in the world and 5th in Brazil, and surpassed 100,000 views or downloads in the first 24 hours. However, the song was charged with plagiarism. Composed by Louro Santos, who confirmed having it transferred to Joelma, the song had been recorded by singer Jade in December of the previous year on an album produced by Ximbinha, which infuriated Joelma's fans. Jade complained about the impact of needless hatred targeting her.

"Não Teve Amor" had been sent along with "Ai Coração" to radio stations for the DJs to decide which to play; "Não Teve Amor" consistently received more requests from listeners and was announced as the first official single from the album. On January 28, 2016, the song was made available for download, and quickly passed one million views on YouTube.

"Debaixo do Mesmo Céu" was the second official single. Its video was released on July 8 on YouTube and accumulated more than one million views.

"Pa'Lante" was not an official single, but was released on Joelma's YouTube channel on August 12. The video was played during her Tour Avanta shows while she made a costume change. Along with "Te Quiero", another Spanish-language song, it had been recorded November 4–5, 2015, as the last commitment to Banda Calypso. The video was a fan favorite, drawing 100,000 views in a day.

=== Promotion ===
Joelma promoted the album with a series of performances and appearances on television. Delayed from January 8, 2016, her Avante Tour began on March 18 in Goiânia, Goiás, two weeks before the release of the album.

Three songs from Joelma were included in the initial repertoire of the tour: "Não Teve Amor", "Ai Coração" and "Voando Pro Pará". On select dates other songs from the album were performed, such as "Debaixo do Mesmo Céu", "Game Over", "Tua Face" and "O Amor de Deus". Spanish-language songs "Pa'Lante" and "Te Quiero" were played as videos during a costume change. Many classic songs from Joelma's career with Banda Calypso were also included, and the tour marked the first time she played guitar on stage, during the song "Fala Pra Mim".

On March 31, 2016, the day of the album's release, Joelma appeared live on Encontro com Fátima Bernardes and performed "Não Teve Amor", "Ai Coração" and "Voando Pro Pará". On April 4 Joelma appeared on Xuxa Meneghel, and made the first television performances of Banda Calypso's hits "Doce Mel", "Cúmbia do Amor" and "Dudu" in addition to "Não Teve Amor" and "Voando Pro Pará". On April 10 the singer participated in the program Eliana, talking with the presenter about the album and singing excerpts of new songs. On April 13 Joelma, on Programa do Ratinho, Joelma performed "Não Teve Amor" and "Voando Pro Pará", and sang Banda Calypso's hit "Quem Ama Não Deixa de Amar" with Amado Batista. On April 16 Joelma returned to Programa da Sabrina, where she had announced her departure from Banda Calypso eight months earlier. Joelma performed on Sabadão on April 23, singing all the singles from the album and Banda Calypso hits. Joelma also appeared on Legendários, The Noite and Máquina da Fama.

== Track listing ==
| No. | Title | Writer(s) | Length |
|---|---|---|---|
| 1. | "Não Teve Amor" | Marília Mendonça; Juliano Tchula; Rangel Castro | 3:12 |
| 2. | "Chora Não Coração" | Marcibrom | 3:17 |
| 3. | "Se Vira Ai" | Zel Moreira; Cecilio Nena | 3:03 |
| 4. | "Game Over" | Edilson Moreno; Gleyse Dominguez | 3:17 |
| 5. | "Ai Coração" | Louro Santos; Veneci Moreno | 3:28 |
| 6. | "Barca Furada" | Louro Santos | 3:25 |
| 7. | "Debaixo do Mesmo Céu" | Marília Mendonça; Juliano Tchula; Rodrigo Cavalheiro | 3:40 |
| 8. | "Tarde Demais" | Louro Santos; Waldecy Moreno | 3:33 |
| 9. | "Te Quiero" (in Spanish) | Gianko Gómez; Luiz Enrique Mejia; Cesar Lemos | 3:33 |
| 10. | "Voando Pro Pará" | Valter Serraria; Nilk Oliveira; Crystian Lima; Isac Maraial | 2:59 |
| 11. | "A Página Virou" | Abimael Gomes; Léo Gomes | 3:23 |
| 12. | "Pa'Lante" (in Spanish) | Cesar Lemos; Karla Aponte; Jorge L. Piloto | 3:31 |
| 13. | "Tua Face" | Joelma | 3:38 |
| 14. | "O Amor de Deus" (featuring Natalia, Yago and Yasmin) | Michael Sullivan; Carlos Colla | 5:52 |
| Total length: | | | 47:41 |

== Reception ==
According to Damy Coelho of Cifraclubnews, all the songs on the EP have a theme of "overcoming a painful love". Coelho related this to Joelma's 2015 separation from Ximbinha. Coelho also stated there was an attractive mix of styles, such as arrocha and tecnobrega, and showed much more of Joelma's hand in the melodies than the works of Banda Calypso.

=== Charts ===
| Chart (2016) | Peak position |
|---|---|
| Brazilian Albums (ABPD) | 2 |
| Brazilian Albums (Billboard) | 2 |
