= Ai coração =

2023 song by Mimicat

Single by Mimicat

from the album Peito
- Language: Portuguese
- Released: 27 January 2023
- Length: 2:54
- Label: Sony Music Entertainment
- Songwriters: Marisa Mena; Luís Pereira

Mimicat singles chronology
"Mundo ao Contrário" (2022)	"Ai coração" (2023)	"Veis ter saudades" (2023)

Music video
- "Ai coração" on YouTube

Eurovision Song Contest 2023 entry
- Country: Portugal
- Artist: Mimicat
- Language: Portuguese
- Composers: Marisa Mena; Luís Pereira
- Lyricist: Marisa Mena

Finals performance
- Semi-final result: 9th
- Semi-final points: 74
- Final result: 23rd
- Final points: 59

Entry chronology
- ◄ "Saudade, saudade" (2022)
- "Grito" (2024) ►

Official performance video
- "Ai coração" (First Semi-Final) on YouTube "Ai coração" (Grand Final) on YouTube

"Ai coração" (Portuguese pronunciation: [ˈaj kuɾɐˈsɐ̃w]; transl. "Oh heart") is a 2023 song by Portuguese singer-songwriter Mimicat. The song represented Portugal in the Eurovision Song Contest 2023 after winning Festival da Canção 2023, the Portuguese national selection for that year's Eurovision Song Contest. It finished in 23rd place with 59 points and achieved minor chart success in Lithuania and Portugal.

== Background and composition ==
"Ai coração" was composed by Mimicat and Luis Pereira, with lyrics written by Mimicat alone. She has described the song as a danceable mix of burlesque and classical jazz drawing on musical traditions from Portugal, Spain, the Balkans and Latin America.

Mimicat wrote "Ai coração" ten years before entering it into Festival da Canção 2023, around the time she released her debut album, For You. She entered the contest through its open-call route, for songs submitted by the public rather than invited by the Portuguese broadcaster RTP, and later said in an interview with radio station Antena 1 that she "had to wait ten years" for the chance to reach a wide audience with the song.

By her own account, she was bored and waiting for someone in an empty house when the words and melody came to her; she had the song finished within about five minutes, except the bridge. Feeling it suited a more fado-influenced singer like Ana Bacalhau or Gisela João better than her own style, she set it aside for years rather than record it herself. She returned to the song around four years before the contest, after she had begun recording in Portuguese, though she remained unsure how to produce it in a way that felt like her own. She entered it in Festival da Canção without telling her producer or her husband, and finished writing and rearranging the song within about a month once RTP had accepted her entry.

== Release ==
The lyric video was released on Festival da Canção's official YouTube channel on 19 January 2023, along with all other songs competing in Festival da Canção 2023. The songs were subsequently released on digital streaming sites on 27 January 2023. On 19 January 2023, Mimicat was announced to be performing her song, titled "Ai coração".

Subsequently, the music video for the song was released on 1 May 2023 on the official YouTube channel of the Eurovision Song Contest.

== Eurovision Song Contest ==
=== Festival da Canção 2023 ===
On 11 November 2022, Mimicat was announced as a participating songwriter of Festival da Canção 2023, Portugal's national selection for the Eurovision Song Contest 2023. On 19 January 2023, Mimicat was announced to be performing her song, titled "Ai coração". She competed in the first semi-final on 25 February 2023. In the final, held on 12 March 2023, she won both the jury vote and the televote, placing first overall with 24 points, becoming the Portuguese representative at the Eurovision Song Contest 2023.

=== At Eurovision ===
According to Eurovision rules, all nations with the exceptions of the host country and the "Big Five" (France, Germany, Italy, Spain and the United Kingdom) are required to qualify for one of two semi-finals in order to compete for the final; the top 10 countries from each semi-final progress to the final. The European Broadcasting Union (EBU) split up the competing countries into six different pots based on voting patterns from previous contests, with countries with favourable voting histories put into the same pot.

On 31 January 2023, an allocation draw was held, which placed each country into one of the two semi-finals, and determined which half of the show they would perform in. Portugal was placed into the first semi-final, held on 9 May 2023, and was scheduled to perform in the first half of the show. Portugal performed in position five, following the entry from Latvia and preceding the entry from Ireland. For the grand final, Portugal was drawn to compete on the first half. Portugal was subsequently placed to perform in position 2, following the entry from Austria and before the entry from Switzerland.

== Charts ==
Chart performance for "Ai coração"
Chart (2023)	Peak position
Lithuania (AGATA)	34
Portugal (AFP)	24
