= Portugal in the Eurovision Song Contest 2024 =

- Eurovision Song Contest 2024
- Participating broadcaster: Rádio e Televisão de Portugal (RTP)
- Country: Portugal
- Selection process: Festival da Canção 2024
- Selection date: Semi-finals: 24 February 2024; 2 March 2024; Final: 9 March 2024

Competing entry
- Song: "Grito"
- Artist: Iolanda
- Songwriters: Alberto "Luar" Hernández; Iolanda Costa

Placement
- Semi-final result: Qualified (8th, 58 points)
- Final result: 10th, 152 points

Participation chronology

Portugal was represented at the Eurovision Song Contest 2024 with the song "Grito", written by Alberto Hernández and Iolanda Costa, and performed by Iolanda herself. The Portuguese participating broadcaster, Rádio e Televisão de Portugal (RTP), organised the national final Festival da Canção 2024 in order to select its entry for the contest.

Portugal was drawn to compete in the first semi-final of the Eurovision Song Contest which took place on 7 May 2024 and was later selected to perform in position 14. At the end of the show, "Grito" was announced among the top 10 entries of the first semi-final and hence qualified to compete in the final. It was later revealed that Portugal placed eighth out of the fifteen participating countries in the semi-final with 58 points. In the final, Portugal performed in position 18 and placed tenth out of the 25 performing countries, scoring a total of 152 points.

== Background ==
Prior to the 2024 contest, Radiotelevisão Portuguesa (RTP) until 2003, and Rádio e Televisão de Portugal (RTP) since 2004, have participated in the Eurovision Song Contest representing Portugal 54 times since their first entry in 1964. They had won the contest on one occasion: in 2017 with the song "Amar pelos dois" performed by Salvador Sobral. Following the introduction of semi-finals for the 2004 contest, Portugal had featured in only eight finals. Its least successful result had been last place, which it had achieved on four occasions, most recently in 2018 with the song "O jardim" performed by Cláudia Pascoal. It had also received nul points on two occasions: in 1964 and 1997. In 2023, "Ai coração" performed by Mimicat placed 23rd.

As part of its duties as participating broadcaster, RTP organises the selection of its entry in the Eurovision Song Contest and broadcasts the event in the country. The broadcaster had traditionally selected its entry for the contest via the music competition Festival da Canção, with exceptions in 1988 and 2005 when the entries were internally selected. RTP confirmed its participation in the 2024 contest on 7 August 2023, announcing the organization of the 58th Festival da Canção in order to select its 2024 entry.

== Before Eurovision ==
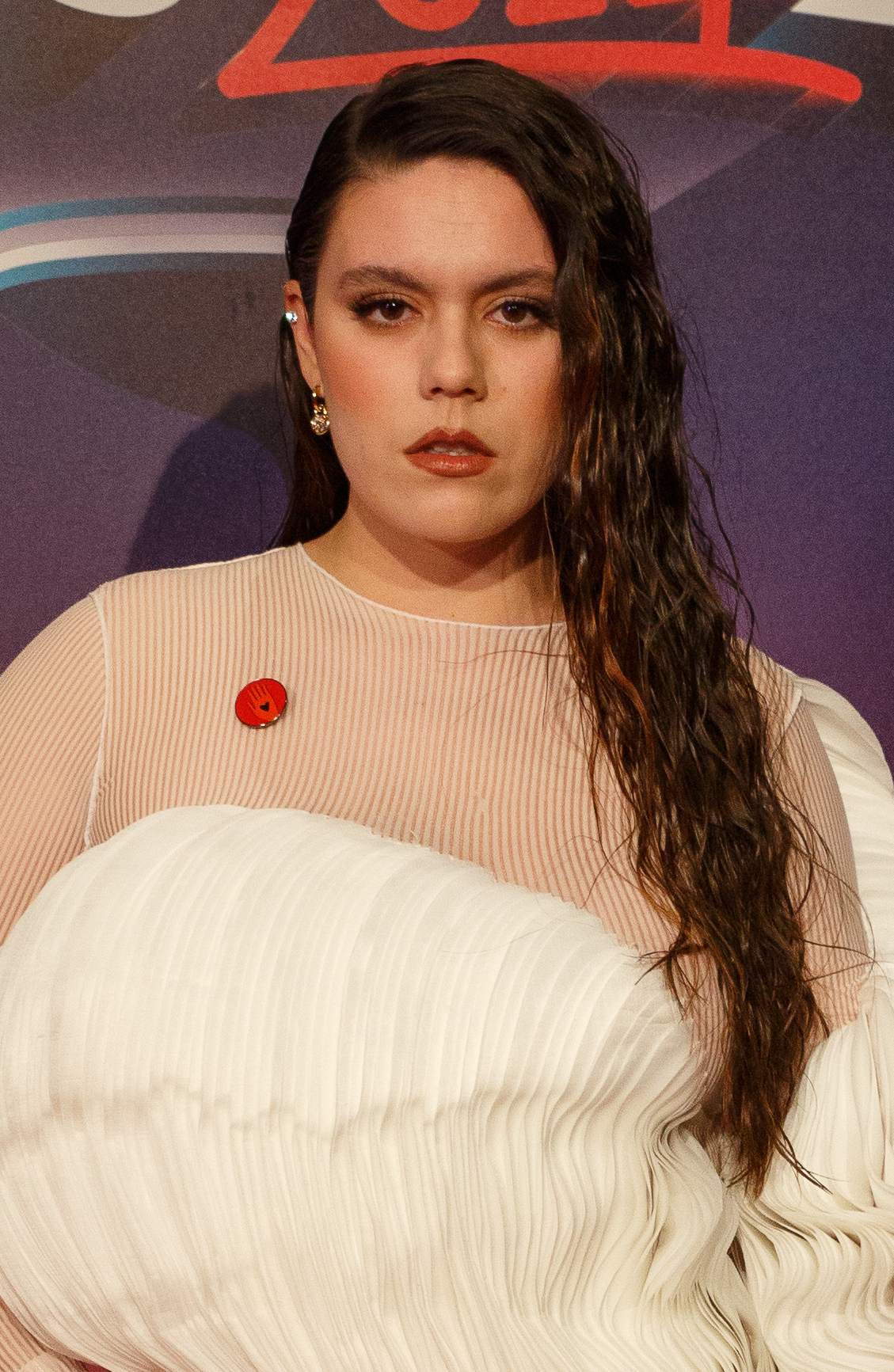
Iolanda, winner of Festival da Canção 2024, at the PrePartyES event in Madrid

=== Festival da Canção 2024 ===
The official logotype of Festival da Canção 2024

The 58th edition of Festival da Canção took place between February and March 2024 at the RTP studios in Lisbon and featured 20 acts competing over two semi-finals and a final. Each show was hosted by a different couple of presenters, while Inês Lopes Gonçalves and Wandson Lisboa were the green room hosts in all of them. The shows were broadcast on RTP1 as well as on other domestic and international channels of RTP, and streamed online via RTP Play.

To celebrate 60 years since the first edition of Festival da Canção, the shows featured as guests a number of past winners who went on to represent Portugal at Eurovision, namely António Calvário (1964), Simone de Oliveira (1965 and 1969), Paulo de Carvalho (solo in 1974 and as part of Os Amigos in 1977), Adelaide Ferreira (1985), Anabela (1993), Tó Cruz (1995), Inês Santos (1998 as part of Alma Lusa), Rita Guerra (2003), Vânia Fernandes (2008), Filipa Sousa (2012), Suzy (2014), Isaura (2018), Elisa Silva (2020), The Black Mamba (2021) and Mimicat (2023); as well as several former contestants or hosts of the festival, namely Helena Isabel, Herman José, Delfins, António Sala, Pedro Granger, Catarina Furtado, Selma Uamusse, Tozé Brito, Eládio Clímaco, Milhanas, Isabel Angelino, Sílvia Alberto, Júlio Isidro, Pedro Fernandes, Margarida Mercês de Melo, Sofia Morais, José Nuno Martins, Ana Paula Reis, Isabel Campelo, Jorge Fernando, Manuel Luís Goucha, Helena Coelho, Rui Drumond and António Victorino de Almeida; in addition, Alex D'Alva Teixeira, Ana Lua Caiano and Luca Argel performed.

==== Competing entries ====
RTP selected 14 entries by direct invitation of composers, and the remaining six from a record 809 entries received through an open submission window between 7 August and 15 October 2023; selected composers were then required to send the full versions of their entries by 30 November 2023.

On 6 November 2023, RTP announced the list of selected composers. Their entries were unveiled on 18 January 2024 during a presentation event at Musicbox in Lisbon.

Artist	Song	Songwriter(s)	Selection
Bispo	"Casa portuguesa"	Pedro Bispo	Invited by RTP
Buba Espinho	"O farol"	Bernardo Espinho	Invited by RTP
Cristina Clara	"Primavera"	Cristina Clara; Jon Luz	Invited by RTP
Filipa	"You Can't Hide"	Filipa Carmo da Silva; Marie Jenkins; Rich Pilkington	Open call winner
Huca	"Pé de choro"	Bruno Huca; Milton Gulli	Invited by RTP
Iolanda	"Grito"	Alberto "Luar" Hernández; Iolanda Costa	Invited by RTP
João Borsch	"...Pelas costuras"	João Santos Borges	Invited by RTP
João Couto	"Quarto para um"	João Couto	Open call winner
Left.	"Volto a ti"	António Maciel Graça	Open call winner
Leo Middea	"Doce mistério"	Leo Middea	Invited by RTP
Maria João	"Dia"	João Farinha; Maria João Grancha	Invited by RTP
Mela	"Água"	Mariana Gonçalves	Open call winner
Mila Dores	"Afia a língua"	Filipe Sambado; Mila Dores	Invited by RTP
Nena	"Teorias da conspiração"	Nena Marques	Invited by RTP
Noble	"Memory"	Pedro Fidalgo; Rui Saraiva	Invited by RTP
No Maka feat. Ana Maria	"Aceitar"	Ana Maria Ramos; Duarte Carvalho; Emanuel Oliveira; Mara Cortez; Marcelo Garrido; Rafael Martins	Invited by RTP
Perpétua	"Bem longe daqui"	Beatriz Capote; Diogo Rocha; Ruben Teixeira; Xavier Sousa	Invited by RTP
Rita Onofre	"Criatura"	Rita Onofre	Open call winner
Rita Rocha	"Pontos finais"	Rita Rocha	Open call winner
Silk Nobre	"Change"	Artur Guimarães; Fernando Nobre; Rui Pedro Pity	Invited by RTP

==== Semi-finals ====
The semi-finals took place on 24 February and 2 March 2024, the first hosted by Tânia Ribas de Oliveira and José Carlos Malato and the second by Sónia Araújo and Jorge Gabriel. In each show, 10 entries competed, with 6 advancing to the final. The voting occurred in two rounds: a 50/50 combination of votes from an expert jury and a public televote determined the first five qualifiers, and a second round of televoting determined the sixth and final qualifier. The jury consisted of Gisela João, Benjamim, Lia Pereira, Miguel Esteves Cardoso, Lura, Pedro Oliveira and Mimicat.

Key: Jury and televote round qualifier Televote-only round qualifier

Semi-final 1 – First round – 24 February 2024
R/O	Artist	Song	Jury	Televote		Total	Place
R/O	Artist	Song	Jury	Percentage	Points	Total	Place
1	Nena	"Teorias da conspiração"	10	9.03%	5	15	3
2	Perpétua	"Bem longe daqui"	6	17.08%	12	18	2
3	Mela	"Água"	4	4.20%	3	7	8
4	Mila Dores	"Afia a língua"	3	2.12%	1	4	9
5	Left.	"Volto a ti"	1	3.04%	2	3	10
6	Rita Rocha	"Pontos finais"	7	14.90%	7	14	5
7	Noble	"Memory"	2	15.73%	8	10	6
8	João Borsch	"...Pelas costuras"	8	9.68%	6	14	4
9	Iolanda	"Grito"	12	16.47%	10	22	1
10	Bispo	"Casa portuguesa"	5	7.75%	4	9	7

Semi-final 1 – Second round – 24 February 2024
Artist	Song	Televote	Place
Bispo	"Casa portuguesa"	23.42%	2
Left.	"Volto a ti"	7.43%	4
Mela	"Água"	15.37%	3
Mila Dores	"Afia a língua"	6.33%	5
Noble	"Memory"	47.45%	1

Semi-final 2 – First round – 2 March 2024
R/O	Artist	Song	Jury	Televote		Total	Place
R/O	Artist	Song	Jury	Percentage	Points	Total	Place
1	Buba Espinho	"O farol"	7	11.52%	7	14	4
2	Cristina Clara	"Primavera"	10	5.63%	2	12	5
3	Leo Middea	"Doce mistério"	12	9.48%	5	17	1
4	Filipa	"You Can't Hide"	1	3.04%	1	2	10
5	João Couto	"Quarto para um"	4	10.08%	6	10	7
6	Huca	"Pé de choro"	6	6.77%	3	9	9
7	No Maka feat. Ana Maria	"Aceitar"	5	14.47%	10	15	2
8	Maria João	"Dia"	8	7.47%	4	12	6
9	Rita Onofre	"Criatura"	2	12.59%	8	10	8
10	Silk Nobre	"Change"	3	18.95%	12	15	3

Semi-final 2 – Second round – 2 March 2024
Artist	Song	Televote	Place
Filipa	"You Can't Hide"	12.08%	5
Huca	"Pé de choro"	20.82%	4
João Couto	"Quarto para um"	21.70%	2
Maria João	"Dia"	21.68%	3
Rita Onofre	"Criatura"	23.72%	1

==== Final ====
The final took place on 9 March 2024 and was hosted by Filomena Cautela and Vasco Palmeirim. The winner was selected based on the 50/50 combination of votes from seven three-member regional juries (one for each of the regions of Portugal) and from a public televote open throughout the week preceding the show; in the event of a tie, the public voting would take precedence.

Final – 9 March 2024
R/O	Artist	Song	Jury		Televote		Total	Place
R/O	Artist	Song	Votes	Points	Percentage	Points	Total	Place
1	Silk Nobre	"Change"	43	7	7.64%	5	12	4
2	Rita Onofre	"Criatura"	32	5	3.12%	0	5	8
3	Noble	"Memory"	18	1	7.81%	6	7	7
4	Buba Espinho	"O farol"	46	8	7.06%	2	10	6
5	Nena	"Teorias da conspiração"	24	3	5.82%	1	4	10
6	Iolanda	"Grito"	80	12	16.29%	10	22	1
7	No Maka feat. Ana Maria	"Aceitar"	14	0	7.60%	3	3	11
8	Cristina Clara	"Primavera"	22	2	2.38%	0	2	12
9	Rita Rocha	"Pontos finais"	30	4	8.51%	7	11	5
10	Leo Middea	"Doce mistério"	57	10	9.17%	8	18	3
11	Perpétua	"Bem longe daqui"	7	0	7.60%	4	4	9
12	João Borsch	"...Pelas costuras"	33	6	17.00%	12	18	2

Detailed regional jury votes
R/O	Song	North	Central	Lisbon Area	Alentejo	Algarve	Madeira	Azores	Total
1	"Change"	3	6	12	2	6	4	10	43
2	"Criatura"	6	5	6		3	5	7	32
3	"Memory"	2	3	4		4	3	2	18
4	"O farol"	8	8	5	12	10	2	1	46
5	"Teorias da conspiração"	5	1	1	4	5	8		24
6	"Grito"	12	12	10	10	12	12	12	80
7	"Aceitar"		2		8		1	3	14
8	"Primavera"	1	7	7	3			4	22
9	"Pontos finais"	7		3	1	7	7	5	30
10	"Doce mistério"	10	10	8	7	8	6	8	57
11	"Bem longe daqui"				5	2			7
12	"...Pelas costuras"	4	4	2	6	1	10	6	33
Members of the jury
North: Igor Domingues, Catarina Maia, Valter Lobo; Central: John Gonçalves, Sofia Lisboa, Yola Dinis; Lisbon Area: Frankie Chavez, Luís Guerreiro, Margarida Campelo; Alentejo: Daniel Boto, Nuno Figueiredo, Vicente Alves do Ó; Algarve: Edmundo Vieira, João de Brito, Nuno Guerreiro; Madeira: Gustavo Paixão, Micaela Abreu, Pedro Camacho; Azores: Eugénia Contente, Luís Barrences, Vânia Dilac

==== Broadcasts and ratings ====
Local and international broadcasters of Festival da Canção 2024
Country	Broadcaster	Channel(s)	Show(s)	Commentators	Ref.
Portugal	RTP	RTP1	All shows	—N/a	
Portugal	RTP	RTP África	All shows	—N/a	
Portugal	RTP	RTP Internacional	All shows	—N/a	
Portugal	RTP	Antena 1	All shows	—N/a	
Portugal	RTP	RTP Play	All shows	—N/a	
Spain	RTVE	RTVE Play	Final	Daniel Borrego Escot and Marina Segovia	

Viewing figures by show
Show	Air date	Average viewership	Average share (%)	Peak viewership	Peak share (%)	Ref.
Semi-final 1	24 February 2024	437,000	11%	653,500	13.7%	
Semi-final 2	2 March 2024	424,300	10.3%	704,500	14.3%	
Final	9 March 2024	486,900	12%	Unknown	18.3%	

=== Promotion ===
As part of the promotion of her participation in the contest, Iolanda attended the PrePartyES in Madrid on 30 March 2024. In addition, she performed at the Eurovision Village in Malmö on 4 May 2024.

== At Eurovision ==
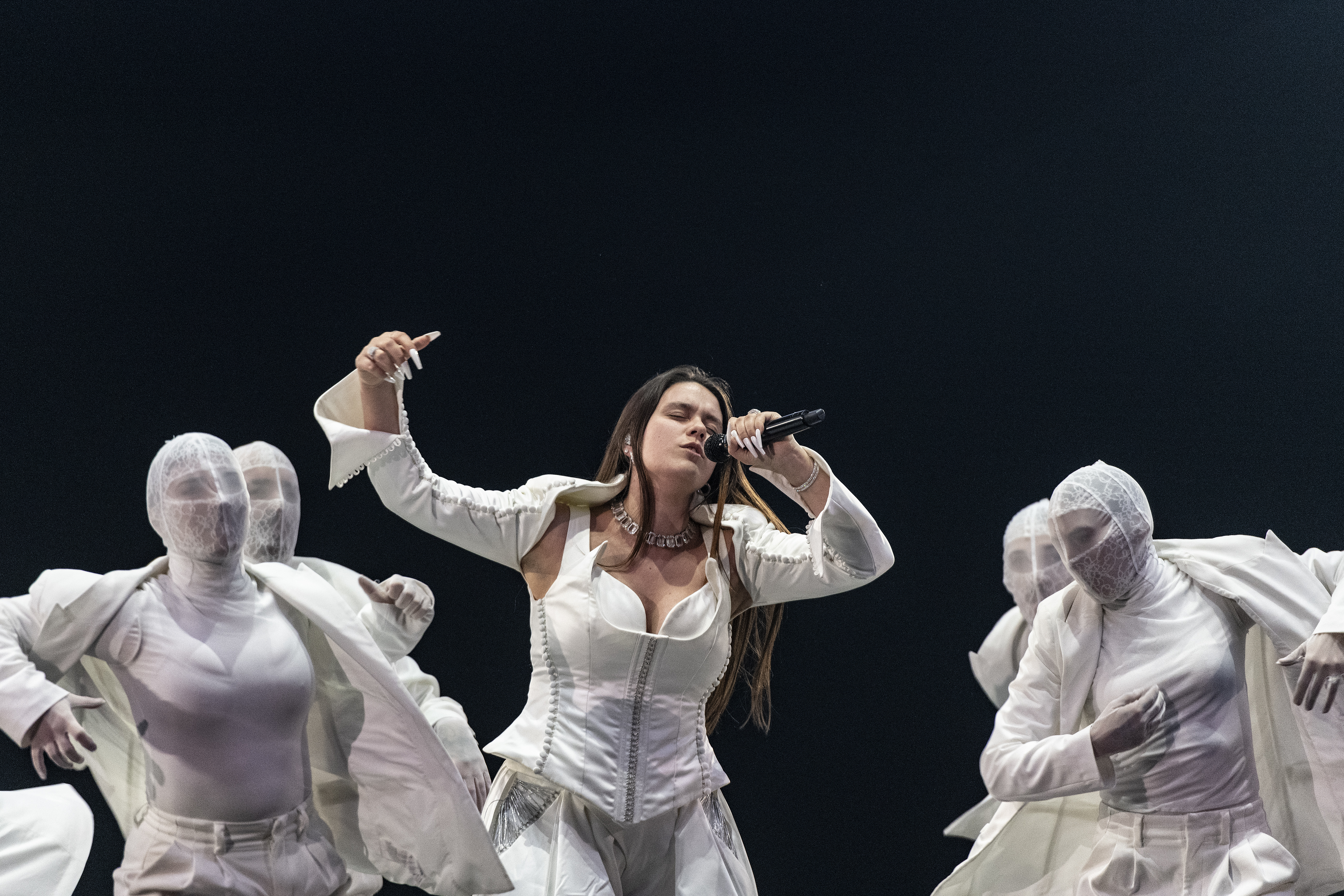
Iolanda during a rehearsal before the final.

The Eurovision Song Contest 2024 took place at the Malmö Arena in Malmö, Sweden, and consisted of two semi-finals held on the respective dates of 7 and 9 May and the final on 11 May 2024. All nations with the exceptions of the host country and the "Big Five" (France, Germany, Italy, Spain and the United Kingdom) were required to qualify from one of two semi-finals in order to compete in the final; the top ten countries from each semi-final progressed to the final. On 30 January 2024, an allocation draw was held to determine which of the two semi-finals, as well as which half of the show, each country would perform in; the European Broadcasting Union (EBU) split up the competing countries into different pots based on voting patterns from previous contests, with countries with favourable voting histories put into the same pot. Portugal was scheduled for the second half of the first semi-final. The shows' producers then decided the running order for the semi-finals; Portugal was set to perform in position 14.

In Portugal, all three shows were broadcast on RTP1, with the broadcast of the second semi-final starting delayed; commentary was provided by José Carlos Malato and Nuno Galopim. In addition, RTP aired the contest internationally through RTP Internacional and RTP África as well as on its streaming platform RTP Play.

=== Performance ===
Iolanda took part in technical rehearsals on 28 April and 1 May, followed by dress rehearsals on 6 and 7 May. For her performance of "Grito" at the contest, she was joined on stage by five dancers; the colour white dominated the staging and costumes.

=== Semi-final ===
Portugal performed in position 14, following the entry from Australia and before the entry from Luxembourg. At the end of the show, the country was announced as a qualifier for the final. It was later revealed that Portugal placed eighth out of the fifteen participating countries in the first semi-final with 58 points.

=== Final ===
Following the semi-final, Portugal drew "producer's choice" for the final, meaning that the country will perform in the half decided by the contest's producers. Portugal will perform in position 18, following the entry from Finland and before the entry from Armenia. Iolanda once again took part in dress rehearsals on 10 and 11 May before the final, including the jury final where the professional juries cast their final votes before the live show on 11 May. She performed a repeat of her semi-final performance during the final on 11 May. Portugal placed tenth in the final, scoring 152 points; 13 points from the public televoting and 139 points from the juries.

=== Voting ===
Below is a breakdown of points awarded by and to Portugal in the first semi-final and in the final. Voting during the three shows involved each country awarding sets of points from 1-8, 10 and 12: one from their professional jury and the other from televoting in the final vote, while the semi-final vote was based entirely on the vote of the public. The Portuguese jury consisted of Joaquim Albergaria, Inês Henriques, Edmundo Inácio, Rafaela e Ribas dos Santos da Silva Rodrigues, and Patrícia Silveira. In the first semi-final, Portugal placed 8th with 58 points, receiving maximum twelve points from Luxembourg and marking the country's fourth consecutive qualification to the final. In the final, Portugal placed 10th with 152 points, receiving twelve points in the jury vote from Croatia, France, and the United Kingdom. Over the course of the contest, Portugal awarded its 12 points to Ukraine in the first semi-final, and to Switzerland (jury) and Israel (televote) in the final.

RTP appointed Mimicat, who represented Portugal in 2023, as its spokesperson to announce the Portuguese jury's votes in the final.

==== Points awarded to Portugal ====
Points awarded to Portugal (Semi-final 1)
Score	Televote
12 points	Luxembourg
10 points	
8 points	
7 points	
6 points	
5 points	Lithuania; Serbia
4 points	Azerbaijan; Cyprus; Finland
3 points	Ireland; Moldova; Poland; Rest of the World
2 points	Australia; Croatia; Slovenia; Ukraine; United Kingdom
1 point	Germany; Iceland

Points awarded to Portugal (Final)
Score	Televote	Jury
12 points		Croatia; France; United Kingdom
10 points		Armenia
8 points		Lithuania; Netherlands; Slovenia
7 points		Switzerland
6 points	Luxembourg	Greece; Poland
5 points	France	Albania; Ireland; San Marino
4 points		Georgia; Iceland; Moldova; Sweden
3 points		Czechia; Israel; Luxembourg; Spain; Ukraine
2 points	Switzerland	Belgium
1 point		Latvia; Malta

==== Points awarded by Portugal ====
Points awarded by Portugal (Semi-final 1)
Score	Televote
12 points	Ukraine
10 points	Luxembourg
8 points	Cyprus
7 points	Ireland
6 points	Croatia
5 points	Moldova
4 points	Lithuania
3 points	Slovenia
2 points	Australia
1 point	Serbia

Points awarded by Portugal (Final)
Score	Televote	Jury
12 points	Israel	Switzerland
10 points	Ukraine	Ireland
8 points	France	Armenia
7 points	Croatia	Lithuania
6 points	Switzerland	Ukraine
5 points	Ireland	Italy
4 points	Italy	United Kingdom
3 points	Spain	Sweden
2 points	Armenia	Germany
1 point	Cyprus	Serbia

==== Detailed voting results ====
Each participating broadcaster assembles a five-member jury panel consisting of music industry professionals who are citizens of the country they represent. Each jury, and individual jury member, is required to meet a strict set of criteria regarding professional background, as well as diversity in gender and age. No member of a national jury was permitted to be related in any way to any of the competing acts in such a way that they cannot vote impartially and independently. The individual rankings of each jury member as well as the nation's televoting results were released shortly after the grand final.

The following members comprised the Portuguese jury:

- Joaquim Albergaria
- Inês Henriques
- Edmundo Inácio
- Rafaela e Ribas dos Santos da Silva Rodrigues
- Patrícia Silveira

Detailed voting results from Portugal (Semi-final 1)
R/O	Country	Televote	
R/O	Country	Rank	Points
01	Cyprus	3	8
02	Serbia	10	1
03	Lithuania	7	4
04	Ireland	4	7
05	Ukraine	1	12
06	Poland	13	
07	Croatia	5	6
08	Iceland	14	
09	Slovenia	8	3
10	Finland	12	
11	Moldova	6	5
12	Azerbaijan	11	
13	Australia	9	2
14	Portugal		
15	Luxembourg	2	10

Detailed voting results from Portugal (Final)
R/O	Country	Jury							Televote	
R/O	Country	Juror A	Juror B	Juror C	Juror D	Juror E	Rank	Points	Rank	Points
01	Sweden	5	8	10	12	7	8	3	18	
02	Ukraine	7	6	4	10	5	5	6	2	10
03	Germany	10	9	13	7	14	9	2	20	
04	Luxembourg	12	16	14	8	9	11		11	
~~05~~	~~Netherlands~~ ‡ (Note: The Netherlands was disqualified prior to the final.)	~~22~~	~~18~~	~~12~~	~~18~~	~~10~~	~~17~~		N/A	
06	Israel	25	25	25	16	22	23		1	12
07	Lithuania	9	4	5	4	6	4	7	12	
08	Spain	21	11	7	13	17	13		8	3
09	Estonia	16	21	6	17	25	14		19	
10	Ireland	1	3	3	2	1	2	10	6	5
11	Latvia	8	13	22	15	21	15		16	
12	Greece	17	20	23	25	16	22		13	
13	United Kingdom	4	5	8	14	15	7	4	17	
14	Norway	13	19	16	22	18	21		15	
15	Italy	11	7	9	6	4	6	5	7	4
16	Serbia	15	10	15	5	13	10	1	22	
17	Finland	24	17	11	20	11	18		14	
18	Portugal									
19	Armenia	3	1	2	3	3	3	8	9	2
20	Cyprus	6	14	21	11	19	12		10	1
21	Switzerland	2	2	1	1	2	1	12	5	6
22	Slovenia	14	15	18	9	20	16		24	
23	Croatia	23	24	19	21	8	20		4	7
24	Georgia	19	23	20	23	23	24		23	
25	France	18	12	17	19	12	19		3	8
26	Austria	20	22	24	24	24	25		21	
