= Portugal in the Eurovision Song Contest 2020 =

- Eurovision Song Contest 2020
- Participating broadcaster: Rádio e Televisão de Portugal (RTP)
- Country: Portugal
- Selection process: Festival da Canção 2020
- Selection date: 7 March 2020

Competing entry
- Song: "Medo de sentir"
- Artist: Elisa
- Songwriters: Marta Carvalho

Placement
- Final result: Contest cancelled

Participation chronology

Portugal was set to be represented at the Eurovision Song Contest 2020 with the song "Medo de sentir", written by Marta Carvalho and performed by Elisa. The Portuguese participating broadcaster, Rádio e Televisão de Portugal (RTP), organised the national final Festival da Canção 2020 in order to select its entry for the contest. After two semi-finals and a final which took place in February and March 2020, "Medo de sentir" performed by Elisa emerged as the winner after achieving the highest score following the combination of votes from seven regional juries and a public televote.

Portugal was drawn to compete in the second semi-final of the Eurovision Song Contest which took place on 14 May 2020. However, the contest was cancelled due to the COVID-19 pandemic.

== Background ==
Prior to the 2020 contest, Radiotelevisão Portuguesa (RTP) until 2003, and Rádio e Televisão de Portugal (RTP) since 2004, have participated in the Eurovision Song Contest representing Portugal fifty-one times since their first entry in 1964. They had won the contest on one occasion: in 2017 with the song "Amar pelos dois" performed by Salvador Sobral. Following the introduction of semi-finals for the 2004, They had featured in only five finals. Their least successful result has been last place, which they have achieved on four occasions, most recently in 2018 with the song "O jardim" performed by Cláudia Pascoal. Portugal has also received nul points on two occasions; in 1964 and in 1997. They failed to qualify to the final in 2019 with the song "Telemóveis" performed by Conan Osíris.

As part of its duties as participating broadcaster, RTP organises the selection of its entry in the Eurovision Song Contest and broadcasts the event in the country. The broadcaster confirmed its participation in the 2020 contest on 19 August 2019. RTP has traditionally selected its entry for the Eurovision Song Contest via the music competition Festival da Canção, with exceptions in 1988 and in 2005 when the entries were internally selected. Along with its participation confirmation, the broadcaster revealed details regarding its selection procedure and announced the organization of Festival da Canção 2020 in order to select its 2020 entry.

== Before Eurovision ==
=== Festival da Canção 2020 ===
The official logotype of Festival da Canção 2020.

Festival da Canção 2020 was the 54th edition of Festival da Canção organised by RTP to select its entry for the Eurovision Song Contest 2020. Sixteen entries competed in the competition that consisted of two semi-finals held on 22 and 29 February 2020 leading to an eight-song final on 7 March 2020. All three shows of the competition were broadcast on RTP1, RTP África and RTP Internacional as well as online via RTP Play. The shows were also broadcast on RTP Acessibilidades with presentation in Portuguese Sign Language.

==== Format ====
The format of the competition consisted of three shows: two semi-finals on 22 and 29 February 2020 and the final on 7 March 2020. Each semi-final featured eight competing entries from which four advanced from each show to complete the eight song lineup in the final. Results during the semi-finals were determined by the 50/50 combination of votes from a jury panel appointed by RTP and public televoting, while results during the final were determined by the 50/50 combination of votes from seven regional juries and public televoting, which was opened following the second semi-final and closed during the final show. Both the public televote and the juries assigned points from 3-8, 10 and 12 based on the ranking developed by both streams of voting.

==== Format ====
Sixteen composers were selected by RTP through three methods: fourteen invited by RTP for the competition, one selected from 320 submissions received through an open call for songs and one selected from the Antena 1 radio show MasterClass featuring composers without any published work. The composers, which both created the songs and selected its performers, were required to submit the demo and final versions of their entries by 31 October and 31 November 2019, respectively. Songs could be submitted in any language other than Portuguese. The selected composers were revealed on 7 November 2019, while the competing artists were revealed on 15 January 2020.

| Artist | Song | Songwriter(s) | Selection |
|---|---|---|---|
| Bárbara Tinoco | "Passe-Partout" | Tiago Nacarato | Invited by RTP |
| Blasted Mechanism | "Rebellion" | Blasted Mechanism, Stego, Guerra | Invited by RTP |
| Cláudio Frank | "Quero-te abraçar" | Cláudio Frank | MasterClass winner |
| Dubio feat. +351 | "Cegueira" | Rui Azevedo, Pedro Azevedo, Hugo Azevedo | Open call winner |
| Elisa | "Medo de sentir" | Marta Carvalho | Invited by RTP |
| Elisa Rodrigues | "Não voltes mais" | Elisa Rodrigues | Invited by RTP |
| Filipe Sambado | "Gerbera amarela do Sul" | Filipe Sambado | Invited by RTP |
| Ian Mucznik | "O dia de amanhã" | João Cabrita, Ian Mucznik | Invited by RTP |
| Jimmy P | "Abensonhado" | Jimmy P | Invited by RTP |
| Jjazz | "Agora" | Rui Pregal da Cunha | Invited by RTP |
| Judas | "Cubismo enviesado" | Hélio Morais | Invited by RTP |
| Kady | "Diz só" | Dino d'Santiago, Kalaf Epalanga | Invited by RTP |
| Luiz Caracol and Gus Liberdade | "Dói-me o país" | Luiz Caracol, António Avelar de Pinho | Invited by RTP |
| Meera | "Copo de gin" | Meera, Isaura, João Bota | Invited by RTP |
| Throes and the Shine | "Movimento" | Throes and the Shine | Invited by RTP |
| Tomás Luzia | "Mais real que o amor" | Pedro Jóia, Tiago Torres da Silva | Invited by RTP |

==== Semi-finals ====
The two semi-finals took place at RTP's Studio 1 in Lisbon on 22 and 29 February 2020. The first semi-final was hosted by Jorge Gabriel and Tânia Ribas de Oliveira while the second semi-final was hosted by José Carlos Malato and Sónia Araújo. In each semi-final eight entries competed and four advanced to the final based on the 50/50 combination of votes of a jury panel consisting of Anabela, Capicua, Conan Osíris, Héber Marques, Isilda Sanches, Miguel Ângelo, and Rui Miguel Abreu, and a public televote.

Semi-final 1 – 22 February 2020
| R/O | Artist | Song | Jury | Televote | Total | Place |
|---|---|---|---|---|---|---|
| 1 | Meera | "Copo de gin" | 5 | 3 | 8 | 7 |
| 2 | Filipe Sambado | "Gerbera amarela do Sul" | 12 | 5 | 17 | 3 |
| 3 | Ian Mucznik | "O dia de amanhã" | 4 | 4 | 8 | 8 |
| 4 | Bárbara Tinoco | "Passe-Partout" | 8 | 12 | 20 | 2 |
| 5 | Blasted Mechanism | "Rebellion" | 6 | 8 | 14 | 5 |
| 6 | Elisa | "Medo de sentir" | 10 | 10 | 20 | 1 |
| 7 | Jjazz | "Agora" | 3 | 6 | 9 | 6 |
| 8 | Throes and the Shine | "Movimento" | 7 | 7 | 14 | 4 |

Semi-final 2 – 29 February 2020
| R/O | Artist | Song | Jury | Televote | Total | Place |
|---|---|---|---|---|---|---|
| 1 | Dubio feat. +351 | "Cegueira" | 4 | 7 | 11 | 6 |
| 2 | Luiz Caracol and Gus Liberdade | "Dói-me o país" | 7 | 6 | 13 | 5 |
| 3 | Judas | "Cubismo enviesado" | 6 | 4 | 10 | 7 |
| 4 | Kady | "Diz só" | 12 | 8 | 20 | 2 |
| 5 | Elisa Rodrigues | "Não voltes mais" | 8 | 5 | 13 | 4 |
| 6 | Cláudio Frank | "Quero-te abraçar" | 3 | 3 | 6 | 8 |
| 7 | Tomás Luzia | "Mais real que o amor" | 5 | 10 | 15 | 3 |
| 8 | Jimmy P | "Abensonhado" | 10 | 12 | 22 | 1 |

==== Final ====
The final took place at the Coliseu Comendador Rondão Almeida in Elvas on 7 March 2020, hosted by Filomena Cautela and Vasco Palmeirim. The eight entries that qualified from the two preceding semi-finals competed and the winner, "Medo de sentir" performed by Elisa, was selected based on the 50/50 combination of votes of seven regional juries and a public televote. In addition to the performances of the competing entries, Conan Osíris (who represented Portugal in 2019), Joana Espadinha, Lena d'Água, NBC, Samuel Úria together with Alex D'Alva Teixeira, and Surma performed as the interval acts.

Final – 7 March 2020
| R/O | Artist | Song | Jury | Televote | Total | Place |
|---|---|---|---|---|---|---|
| 1 | Filipe Sambado | "Gerbera amarela do Sul" | 12 | 4 | 16 | 3 |
| 2 | Jimmy P | "Abensonhado" | 7 | 6 | 13 | 5 |
| 3 | Tomás Luzia | "Mais real que o amor" | 3 | 8 | 11 | 6 |
| 4 | Elisa Rodrigues | "Não voltes mais" | 4 | 3 | 7 | 8 |
| 5 | Throes and the Shine | "Movimento" | 6 | 5 | 11 | 7 |
| 6 | Kady | "Diz só" | 8 | 7 | 15 | 4 |
| 7 | Elisa | "Medo de sentir" | 10 | 10 | 20 | 1 |
| 8 | Bárbara Tinoco | "Passe-Partout" | 6 | 12 | 18 | 2 |

Detailed regional jury votes
| R/O | Song | North | Central | Lisbon Area | Algarve | Azores | Madeira | Alentejo | Total | Points |
|---|---|---|---|---|---|---|---|---|---|---|
| 1 | "Gerbera amarela do Sul" | 12 | 12 | 12 | 12 | 12 | 10 | 6 | 76 | 12 |
| 2 | "Abensonhado" | 7 | 5 | 10 | 7 | 5 | 7 | 8 | 49 | 7 |
| 3 | "Mais real que o amor" | 3 | 3 | 3 | 6 | 3 | 3 | 3 | 24 | 3 |
| 4 | "Não voltes mais" | 5 | 4 | 5 | 3 | 8 | 8 | 4 | 37 | 4 |
| 5 | "Movimento" | 8 | 7 | 6 | 8 | 7 | 5 | 5 | 46 | 6 |
| 6 | "Diz só" | 10 | 6 | 8 | 4 | 10 | 4 | 10 | 52 | 8 |
| 7 | "Medo de sentir" | 6 | 10 | 4 | 10 | 6 | 12 | 7 | 55 | 10 |
| 8 | "Passe-Partout" | 4 | 8 | 7 | 5 | 4 | 6 | 12 | 46 | 6 |
Members of the jury
North: Né Ladeiras, Fábia Maia, Catarina Miranda; Central: Afonso Rodrigues, Moullinex, Roberto Caetano; Lisbon Area: Teresa Colaço, Noiserv, Pedro Tatanka; Algarve: Miguel Valverde, Tó Viegas, Alexandra; Azores: Flávio Cristovão, Catarina Carvalho, Diogo Lima; Madeira: Ricardo Vasconcelos, Sofia Lacerda, Mariana Camacho; Alentejo: Nuno Figueiredo, Maria João Caetano, Johnny Valas

== At Eurovision ==
According to Eurovision rules, all nations with the exceptions of the host country and the "Big Five" (France, Germany, Italy, Spain and the United Kingdom) are required to qualify from one of two semi-finals in order to compete for the final; the top ten countries from each semi-final progress to the final. The European Broadcasting Union (EBU) split up the competing countries into six different pots based on voting patterns from previous contests, with countries with favourable voting histories put into the same pot. On 28 January 2020, a special allocation draw was held which placed each country into one of the two semi-finals, as well as which half of the show they would perform in. Portugal was placed into the second semi-final, to be held on 14 May 2020, and was scheduled to perform in the second half of the show. However, due to 2019-20 pandemic of Coronavirus, the contest was cancelled.

During the Eurovision Song Celebration YouTube broadcast in place of the semi-finals, it was revealed that Portugal was set to perform in position 15, following the entry from Armenia and before the entry from Georgia.
