= Portugal in the Eurovision Song Contest 2019 =

- Eurovision Song Contest 2019
- Participating broadcaster: Rádio e Televisão de Portugal (RTP)
- Country: Portugal
- Selection process: Festival da Canção 2019
- Selection date: 2 March 2019

Competing entry
- Song: "Telemóveis"
- Artist: Conan Osíris
- Songwriters: Conan Osíris

Placement
- Semi-final result: Failed to qualify (15th)

Participation chronology

Portugal was represented at the Eurovision Song Contest 2019 with the song "Telemóveis" written and performed by Conan Osíris. The Portuguese participating broadcaster, Rádio e Televisão de Portugal (RTP), organised the national final Festival da Canção 2019 in order to select its entry for the contest. After two semi-finals and a final which took place in February and March 2019, "Telemóveis" performed by Conan Osíris emerged as the winner after achieving the highest score following the combination of votes from seven regional juries and a public televote.

Portugal was drawn to compete in the first semi-final of the Eurovision Song Contest which took place on 14 May 2019. Performing during the show in position 15, "Telemóveis" was not announced among the top 10 entries of the first semi-final and therefore did not qualify to compete in the final. It was later revealed that Portugal placed fifteenth out of the 17 participating countries in the semi-final with 51 points.

== Background ==
Prior to the 2019 contest, Radiotelevisão Portuguesa (RTP) until 2003, and Rádio e Televisão de Portugal (RTP) since 2004, had participated in the Eurovision Song Contest representing Portugal fifty times since their first entry in 1964. Portugal had won the contest on one occasion: in 2017 with the song "Amar pelos dois" performed by Salvador Sobral. Following the introduction of semi-finals for the 2004, Portugal had featured in only five finals. Portugal's least successful result has been last place, which they have achieved on four occasions, most recently in 2018 with the song "O jardim" performed by Cláudia Pascoal. Portugal has also received nul points on two occasions; in 1964 and 1997.

As part of its duties as participating broadcaster, RTP organises the selection of its entry in the Eurovision Song Contest and broadcasts the event in the country. The broadcaster confirmed its participation in the 2019 contest on 17 September 2018. RTP has traditionally selected its entry for the contest via the music competition Festival da Canção, with exceptions in 1988 and in 2005 when the entries were internally selected. Along with its participation confirmation, RTP revealed details regarding its selection procedure and announced the organization of Festival da Canção 2019 in order to select its 2019 entry.

== Before Eurovision ==
=== Festival da Canção 2019 ===
The official logotype of Festival da Canção 2019.

Festival da Canção 2019 was the 53rd edition of Festival da Canção that selected Portugal's entry for the Eurovision Song Contest 2019. Sixteen entries competed in the competition that consisted of two semi-finals held on 16 and 23 February 2019 leading to an eight-song final on 2 March 2019. All three shows of the competition were broadcast on RTP1, RTP África and RTP Internacional as well as online via RTP Play. The shows were also broadcast on RTP Acessibilidades with presentation in Portuguese Sign Language.

==== Format ====
The format of the competition consisted of three shows: two semi-finals on 16 and 23 February 2019 and the final on 2 March 2019. Each semi-final featured eight competing entries from which four advanced from each show to complete the eight song lineup in the final. Results during the semi-finals were determined by the 50/50 combination of votes from a jury panel appointed by RTP and public televoting, while results during the final were determined by the 50/50 combination of votes from seven regional juries and public televoting, which was opened following the second semi-final and closed during the final show. Both the public televote and the juries assigned points from 3-8, 10 and 12 based on the ranking developed by both streams of voting.

==== Competing entries ====
Sixteen composers were selected by RTP through three methods: fourteen nominated by Antena 3 presenter Henrique Amaro and invited by RTP for the competition, one selected from over 200 submissions received through an open call for songs and one selected from the Antena 1 radio show MasterClass featuring composers without any published work. The composers, which both created the songs and selected its performers, were required to submit the demo and final versions of their entries by 30 November and 31 December 2018, respectively. Songs could be submitted in any language. The selected composers were revealed on 5 December 2018, while the competing artists were revealed on 21 January 2019.

Artist	Song	Songwriter(s)	Selection
Ana Cláudia	"Inércia"	D'Alva, Ben Monteiro	Invited by RTP
Calema	"A dois"	Calema, Nelson Heleno	Invited by RTP
Conan Osíris	"Telemóveis"	Conan Osíris	Invited by RTP
Dan Riverman	"Lava"	Miguel Guedes	Invited by RTP
Ela Limão	"Mais brilhante que mil sóis"	Flak	Invited by RTP
Filipe Keil	"Hoje"	Filipe Keil	Open call winner
João Campos	"É o que é"	D.A.M.A	Invited by RTP
João Couto	"O jantar"	Pedro Pode	Invited by RTP
Lara Laquiz	"O lugar"	André Tentúgal	Invited by RTP
Madrepaz	"Mundo a mudar"	Frankie Chavez, Pedro Puppe	Invited by RTP
Mariana Bragada	"Mar doce"	Mariana Bragada	MasterClass winner
Matay	"Perfeito"	Tiago Machado, AC Firmino	Invited by RTP
Mila Dores	"Debaixo do luar"	Rui Maia, Mila Dores	Invited by RTP
NBC	"Igual a ti"	NBC	Invited by RTP
Soraia Tavares	"O meu sonho"	Lura	Invited by RTP
Surma	"Pugna"	Surma, Tiago Félix	Invited by RTP

==== Semi-finals ====
The two semi-finals took place at RTP's Studio 1 in Lisbon on 16 and 23 February 2019. The first semi-final was hosted by Sónia Araújo and Tânia Ribas de Oliveira while the second semi-final was hosted by José Carlos Malato and Jorge Gabriel. In each semi-final eight entries competed and four advanced to the final based on the 50/50 combination of votes of a jury panel consisting of Júlio Isidro, Álvaro Costa, Isaura, Maria João, Pedro Penim, Rita Redshoes and Selma Uamusse, and a public televote.

In addition to the performances of the competing entries, Cais Sodré Funk Connection together with Portuguese Eurovision 1964 entrant António Calvário and Portuguese Eurovision 1967 entrant Eduardo Nascimento performed as the interval act in the first semi-final, while Kumpania Algazarra performed as the interval act in the second semi-final.

Semi-final 1 – 16 February 2019
R/O	Artist	Song	Jury	Televote	Total	Place
1	Ana Cláudia	"Inércia"	8	5	13	4
2	João Campos	"É o que é"	6	7	13	5
3	Soraia Tavares	"O meu sonho"	3	3	6	8
4	Calema	"A dois"	10	8	18	3
5	Conan Osíris	"Telemóveis"	7	12	19	2
6	Ela Limão	"Mais brilhante que mil sóis"	5	6	11	6
7	Filipe Keil	"Hoje"	4	4	8	7
8	Matay	"Perfeito"	12	10	22	1

Semi-final 2 – 23 February 2019
R/O	Artist	Song	Jury	Televote	Total	Place
1	Lara Laquiz	"O lugar"	3	3	6	8
2	Dan Riverman	"Lava"	7	8	15	5
3	Mariana Bragada	"Mar doce"	8	7	15	4
4	João Couto	"O jantar"	5	5	10	6
5	Madrepaz	"Mundo a mudar"	6	10	16	3
6	Surma	"Pugna"	12	6	18	2
7	Mila Dores	"Debaixo do luar"	4	4	8	7
8	NBC	"Igual a ti"	10	12	22	1

==== Final ====
The final took place at the Portimão Arena in Portimão on 2 March 2019, hosted by Filomena Cautela and Vasco Palmeirim. The eight entries that qualified from the two preceding semi-finals competed and the winner, "Telemóveis" performed by Conan Osíris, was selected based on the 50/50 combination of votes of seven regional juries and a public televote. Isaura, Portuguese Eurovision 1983 entrant Armando Gama, Portuguese Eurovision 1993 entrant Anabela, Portuguese Eurovision 2008 entrant Vânia Fernandes, and Portuguese Eurovision 2018 entrant Cláudia Pascoal performed as the interval acts.

Final – 2 March 2019
R/O	Artist	Song	Jury	Televote	Total	Place
1	Calema	"A dois"	4	7	11	6
2	Mariana Bragada	"Mar doce"	3	5	8	7
3	Matay	"Perfeito"	7	10	17	3
4	Surma	"Pugna"	8	4	12	5
5	NBC	"Igual a ti"	10	8	18	2
6	Madrepaz	"Mundo a mudar"	7	6	13	4
7	Conan Osíris	"Telemóveis"	12	12	24	1
8	Ana Cláudia	"Inércia"	5	3	8	8

Detailed regional jury votes
R/O	Song	North	Central	Lisbon Area	Alentejo	Azores	Madeira	Algarve	Total	Points
1	"A dois"	5	4	10	3	6	5	4	37	4
2	"Mar doce"	10	3	5	7	4	4	3	36	3
3	"Perfeito"	3	8	4	10	7	7	5	44	7
4	"Pugna"	8	6	3	5	10	6	8	46	8
5	"Igual a ti"	7	10	8	4	3	10	12	54	10
6	"Mundo a mudar"	6	5	7	8	8	3	7	44	7
7	"Telemóveis"	12	12	12	12	12	12	10	82	12
8	"Inércia"	4	7	6	6	5	8	6	42	5
Members of the jury
North: Catarina Salinas, Lia Pereira, Marta Bateira; Central: Samuel Úria, Isilda Sanchez, JP Simões; Lisbon Area: Pedro Granger, Luís, Jorge Alexandre Lopes; Alentejo: Sequin, Vítor Glaciano, Vicente Alves do Ó; Algarve: Dino D'Santiago, João Ferreira, Susana Travassos; Madeira: André Santos, Filipe Gonçalves, João Maurício; Azores: Nuno Costa Santos, Sara Cruz, Luís

== At Eurovision ==
According to Eurovision rules, all nations with the exceptions of the host country and the "Big Five" (France, Germany, Italy, Spain and the United Kingdom) are required to qualify from one of two semi-finals in order to compete for the final; the top ten countries from each semi-final progress to the final. The European Broadcasting Union (EBU) split up the competing countries into six different pots based on voting patterns from previous contests, with countries with favourable voting histories put into the same pot. On 31 January 2017, a special allocation draw was held which placed each country into one of the two semi-finals, as well as which half of the show they would perform in. Portugal was placed into the first semi-final, to be held on 14 May 2019, and was scheduled to perform in the second half of the show.

Once all the competing songs for the 2019 contest had been released, the running order for the semi-finals was decided by the shows' producers rather than through another draw, so that similar songs were not placed next to each other. Portugal was set to perform in position 15, following the entry from Estonia and before the entry from Greece.

In Portugal, the three shows were broadcast on RTP1 and RTP Internacional with commentary by José Carlos Malato and Nuno Galopim. The Portuguese spokesperson, who announced the top 12-point score awarded by the Portuguese jury during the final, was Inês Lopes Gonçalves.

=== Semi-final ===
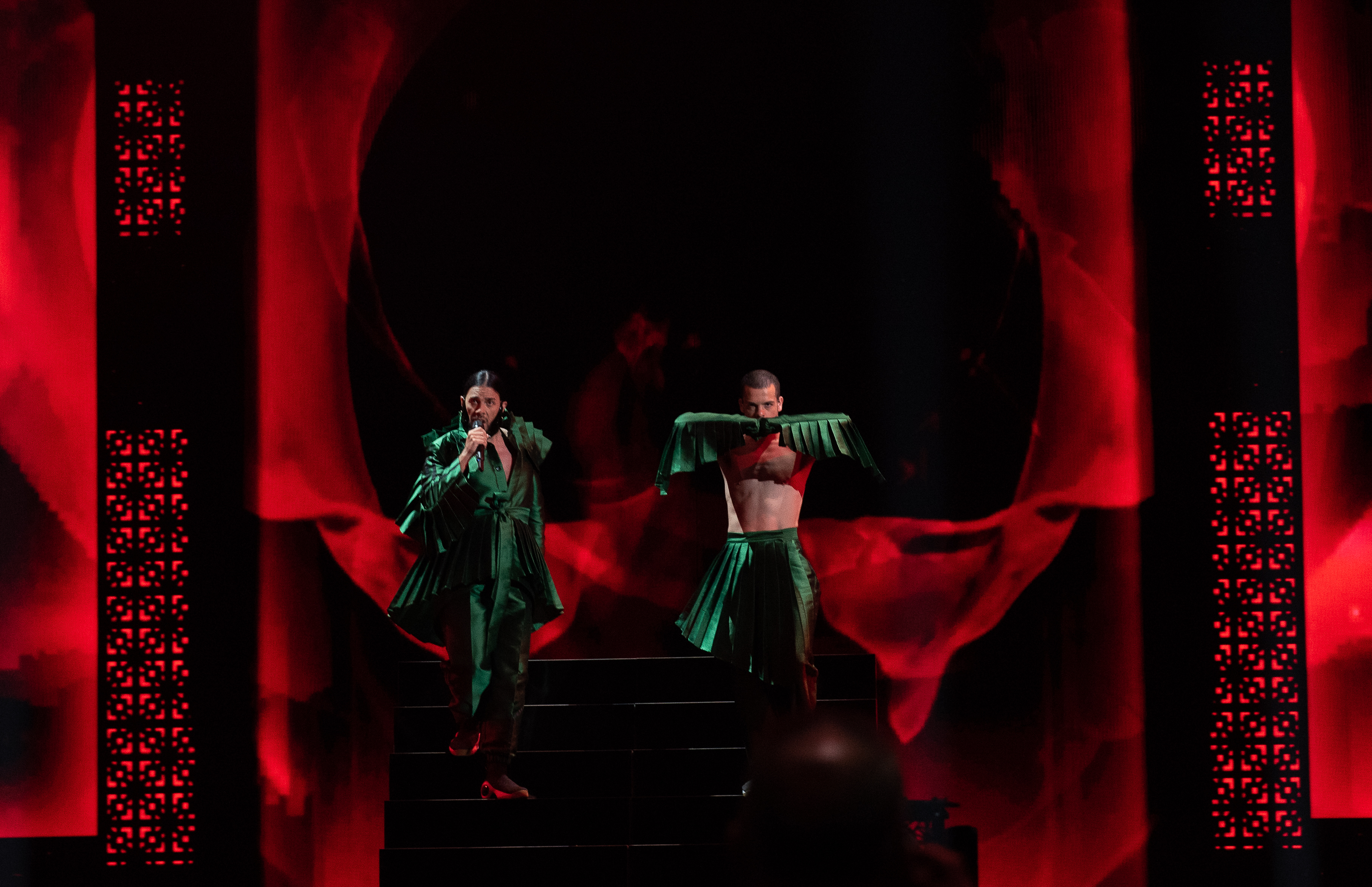
Conan Osíris during a rehearsal before the first semi-final

Conan Osíris took part in technical rehearsals on 5 and 9 May, followed by dress rehearsals on 13 and 14 May. This included the jury final on 13 May where the professional juries of each country watched and voted on the competing entries.

The Portuguese performance featured Conan Osíris wearing a green kimono robe with a large ear piece, designed by designer Ruben Osório, performing a choreographed routine on a small staircase with dancer João Reis Moreira, also dressed in green. The LED screens displayed images of red-coloured roses surrounded by black archways. Conan Osíris was joined by two off-stage backing vocalists: Patrícia Antunes and Patricia Silveira.

At the end of the show, Portugal was not announced among the top 10 entries in the first semi-final and therefore failed to qualify to compete in the final. It was later revealed that Portugal placed fifteenth in the semi-final, receiving a total of 51 points: 43 points from the televoting and 8 points from the juries.

=== Voting ===
Voting during the three shows involved each country awarding two sets of points from 1-8, 10 and 12: one from their professional jury and the other from televoting. Each nation's jury consisted of five music industry professionals who are citizens of the country they represent, with their names published before the contest to ensure transparency. This jury judged each entry based on: vocal capacity; the stage performance; the song's composition and originality; and the overall impression by the act. In addition, no member of a national jury was permitted to be related in any way to any of the competing acts in such a way that they cannot vote impartially and independently. The individual rankings of each jury member as well as the nation's televoting results were released shortly after the grand final.

Below is a breakdown of points awarded to Portugal and awarded by Portugal in the first semi-final and grand final of the contest, and the breakdown of the jury voting and televoting conducted during the two shows:

==== Points awarded to Portugal ====
Points awarded to Portugal (Semi-final 1)
Score	Televote	Jury
12 points	France; Spain	
10 points		
8 points	Belgium	
7 points		
6 points		
5 points		
4 points	Australia	
3 points	Finland	Cyprus
2 points	Belarus; Georgia	Czech Republic; Poland
1 point		Belgium

==== Points awarded by Portugal ====
Points awarded by Portugal (Semi-final 1)
Score	Televote	Jury
12 points	Estonia	Czech Republic
10 points	Australia	Belgium
8 points	Iceland	Slovenia
7 points	Slovenia	Hungary
6 points	San Marino	Belarus
5 points	Greece	Estonia
4 points	Czech Republic	Serbia
3 points	Serbia	Poland
2 points	Belgium	Australia
1 point	Cyprus	Cyprus

Points awarded by Portugal (Final)
Score	Televote	Jury
12 points	Spain	Netherlands
10 points	Russia	Czech Republic
8 points	Netherlands	Azerbaijan
7 points	Italy	Australia
6 points	Norway	Italy
5 points	Switzerland	North Macedonia
4 points	Australia	Norway
3 points	Iceland	Slovenia
2 points	France	Sweden
1 point	Denmark	Switzerland

==== Detailed voting results ====
The following members comprised the Portuguese jury:

- Ana Lúcia Fernandes Paulo (Ana Paulo; jury chairperson) – artist manager
- Hélder Renato Teixeira Coutinho Lopes da Silva (Renato Júnior) – composer, music producer
- Ana Cláudia Lopes Gonçalves (Ana Cláudia) – singer, musician
- Rúben Matay Leal de Sousa (Matay) – singer, entertainer
- Paulo Azevedo Vaz do Castelo – radio producer

Detailed voting results from Portugal (Semi-final 1)
R/O	Country	Jury							Televote	
R/O	Country	R. Júnior	A. Paulo	A. Cláudia	Matay	P. Castelo	Rank	Points	Rank	Points
01	Cyprus	6	8	9	11	8	10	1	10	1
02	Montenegro	14	12	12	9	16	16		16	
03	Finland	10	10	14	14	7	14		15	
04	Poland	16	6	3	15	9	8	3	12	
05	Slovenia	3	9	2	8	4	3	8	4	7
06	Czech Republic	1	3	1	2	3	1	12	7	4
07	Hungary	13	1	11	1	11	4	7	11	
08	Belarus	2	4	4	7	13	5	6	13	
09	Serbia	4	7	7	6	15	7	4	8	3
10	Belgium	8	2	6	13	1	2	10	9	2
11	Georgia	12	14	13	12	10	15		14	
12	Australia	9	11	5	10	6	9	2	2	10
13	Iceland	15	15	10	16	2	12		3	8
14	Estonia	5	5	15	5	5	6	5	1	12
15	Portugal									
16	Greece	11	16	8	3	14	11		6	5
17	San Marino	7	13	16	4	12	13		5	6

Detailed voting results from Portugal (Final)
R/O	Country	Jury							Televote	
R/O	Country	R. Júnior	A. Paulo	A. Cláudia	Matay	P. Castelo	Rank	Points	Rank	Points
01	Malta	23	17	9	19	17	22		17	
02	Albania	22	16	16	23	10	24		23	
03	Czech Republic	5	10	1	14	5	2	10	18	
04	Germany	6	23	11	10	16	15		24	
05	Russia	9	14	17	13	7	16		2	10
06	Denmark	18	6	8	22	6	12		10	1
07	San Marino	25	26	26	25	25	26		22	
08	North Macedonia	1	8	12	7	23	6	5	15	
09	Sweden	15	9	7	3	13	9	2	11	
10	Slovenia	20	3	4	18	12	8	3	16	
11	Cyprus	12	25	22	8	14	20		20	
12	Netherlands	2	1	2	1	22	1	12	3	8
13	Greece	24	22	18	16	21	25		25	
14	Israel	19	15	19	5	24	18		14	
15	Norway	3	21	24	12	3	7	4	5	6
16	United Kingdom	17	18	21	2	19	14		26	
17	Iceland	26	7	14	26	4	13		8	3
18	Estonia	11	11	25	21	15	21		12	
19	Belarus	8	24	10	17	20	19		21	
20	Azerbaijan	7	2	3	11	9	3	8	13	
21	France	14	13	6	4	18	11		9	2
22	Italy	13	12	5	9	2	5	6	4	7
23	Serbia	10	5	20	20	26	17		19	
24	Switzerland	16	19	15	15	1	10	1	6	5
25	Australia	4	4	13	6	11	4	7	7	4
26	Spain	21	20	23	24	8	23		1	12
