= Conan Osíris =

Portuguese singer-songwriter

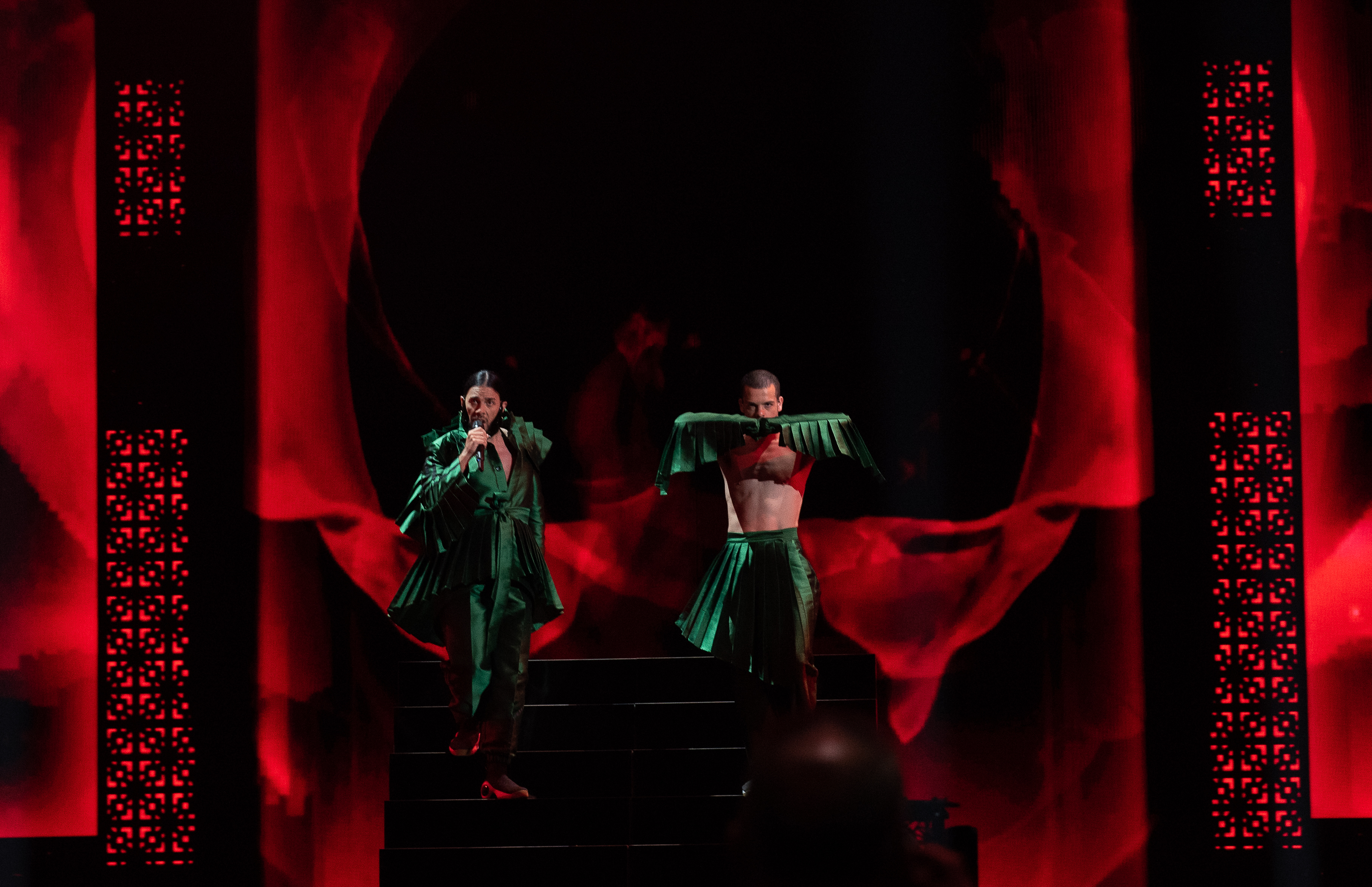
- Osíris (left) and João Reis Moreira (right) performing at the Eurovision Song Contest 2019 in Tel Aviv, Israel

Background information
- Also known as: Elfo das barracas, Powny Lamb
- Born: Tiago Emanuel da Silva Miranda; 5 January 1989 (age 37); Lisbon, Portugal
- Genres: Fado; electrofado; worldbeat; indie house; techno; art pop
- Occupation: Singer-songwriter
- Years active: 2008–present

Tiago Emanuel da Silva Miranda (born 5 January 1989), known professionally as Conan Osíris (Portuguese pronunciation: [ˈkɔnɐn ɔˈziɾiʃ]), is a Portuguese singer-songwriter. His stage name is based on the main character from Japanese series Future Boy Conan and the ancient Egyptian god Osiris. He represented Portugal in the Eurovision Song Contest 2019 with the song "Telemóveis".

== Personal life ==
He was born in Lisbon and lived in Cacém for a few years while in high school. Today, he lives in Lisbon.

In 2010, he finished his degree in graphic design at the Polytechnic Institute of Castelo Branco. In the institute, he met Rúben de Sá Osório, who is his personal designer and dresser.

In 2012, he began working at one of the stores of the well-known Portuguese sex shop chain, ContraNatura, in Lisbon.

In 2018, after the success of his second album "Adoro Bolos" he left his work at ContraNatura to work full time in his musical career.

== Career ==
He is a self-taught singer-songwriter and learnt his craft by trial and error while using the program FL Studio (Fruity Loops) on his computer.

He started his musical career in 2008 when he created the group Powny Lamb with Rita Moreira (also known professionally as Sreya). In 2011, they released their first and only EP, called "Cathedral" on SoundCloud.

He used the stage name Conan Osíris for first time on the track "Secluded" (created for Iuri's Fall/Winter 2013/2014 fashion show in ModaLisboa). He continued his work as a composer for fashion shows with "Evaporate" (Hibu, Spring/Summer 2014), "Pyres" (Gonçalo Pascoa, Spring/Summer 2014), "Triptych" (Valentim Quaresma, Fall/Winter 2014/2015) and "Selenographia" (Hibu, Fall/Winter 2014/2015). These five songs were later released in the 2014 EP, called "Silk", along with the songs "Remuneration" and "Amália", the first song where he sang in Portuguese, recorded with a SingStar microphone.

In 2016, he released his first album called "Música, Normal", about which he said: "Música normal (Normal music) is any music that can be absorbed by a living being. Normal music is the kind of music suited for whatever you want to do: to laugh, to cry, to dance, to travel, to take a shower…"

In 2017, he co-wrote and produced the album "Emocional", the first album by singer Sreya.

On 30 December 2017 he released his second album called "Adoro Bolos" on SoundCloud. This last album drew attention to him and he was invited by some Portuguese TV Shows to perform live, where he sang some of the most successful songs from the album such as "Adoro Bolos", "Celulitite", "Borrego" or "100 Paciência".

In 2018, he was invited by RTP to compose a song for Festival da Canção 2019. He wrote "Telemóveis" and decided to perform himself, On the 2nd of March, and after finishing second on the semi-final, Osíris won the show and represented Portugal in the Eurovision Song Contest 2019. However Osíris failed to qualify to the final, making it the first time since 2015 that Portugal had failed to qualify.

He performed at the Portuguese music festival Super Bock Super Rock 2019, at the Stage Somersby on 18 July,

== Awards ==
Year	Award	Category	Result
2019	PLAY - Portuguese Music Awards	Best New Artist	Won
2019	Barbara Dex Award	Worst Dressed Artist	Won
2019	Golden Globes (Portugal)	Best Individual Performer	Nominated
2019	Golden Globes (Portugal)	Best Newcomer	Nominated

== Discography ==
=== Studio albums ===
Title	Details
Música, Normal	Released: 5 August 2016 (POR); Label: AVNL Records
Adoro Bolos	Released: 30 December 2017 (POR); Label: Ao Sul do Mundo, AVNL Records
Xenonexo	Released: 28 December 2025; Label: Ao Sul do Mundo

=== Extended plays ===
Title	Details
Cathedral	Released: 2011 (POR)
Silk	Released: 24 June 2014 (POR); Label: AVNL Records

=== Singles ===
==== As lead artist ====
List of singles, with selected details and chart positions
Title	Year	Peak chart positions	Album
Title	Year	POR	Album
"Telemóveis"	2019	10	Festival da Canção 2019
"Vinte Vinte (Pranto)" (with Ana Moura & Branko)	2021	99	Non-album singles
"Barquinha" (with Expresso Transatlântico)	2022	—	Non-album singles
"—" denotes a single that did not chart or was not released.

Preceded by Cláudia Pascoal with "O jardim"	Portugal in the Eurovision Song Contest; 2019	Succeeded by Elisa Silva with "Medo de sentir"
