= ! (disambiguation) =

! is a punctuation mark, called an exclamation mark, exclamation point, ecphoneme, or bang.

! or exclamation point may also refer to:

== Mathematics and computers ==
- Factorial, a mathematical function
  - Derangement, a related mathematical function
- Negation, in logic and some programming languages
- Uniqueness quantification, in mathematics and logic
- !, a CONFIG.SYS directive in FreeDOS for unconditional execution of directives
- A dereference operator in BCPL

== Music ==
- ! (The Dismemberment Plan album), released in 1995
- ! (Donnie Vie album), released in 2016
- "! (The Song Formerly Known As)", a single on the 1997 album Unit by Regurgitator
- Exclamation Mark (album), a 2011 album by Jay Chou
- Exclamation Point, a 2010 LP by DA!
- ! (Trippie Redd album), released in 2019
  - "!" (Trippie Redd song), that album's title track
- ! (Cláudia Pascoal album), released in 2020

== Games ==
- An indicator of a good chess move in chess annotation

== See also ==
- !! (disambiguation)
- !!! (disambiguation)
- ‽, the interrobang, made of a question mark and an exclamation mark
- ḷ, not the exclamation mark, but a lower-case letter Ḷ used in Asturian
- ǃ, not the exclamation mark, but the IPA symbol for alveolar click in speech
