= João Borsch =

Portuguese singer and musician (born 2000)

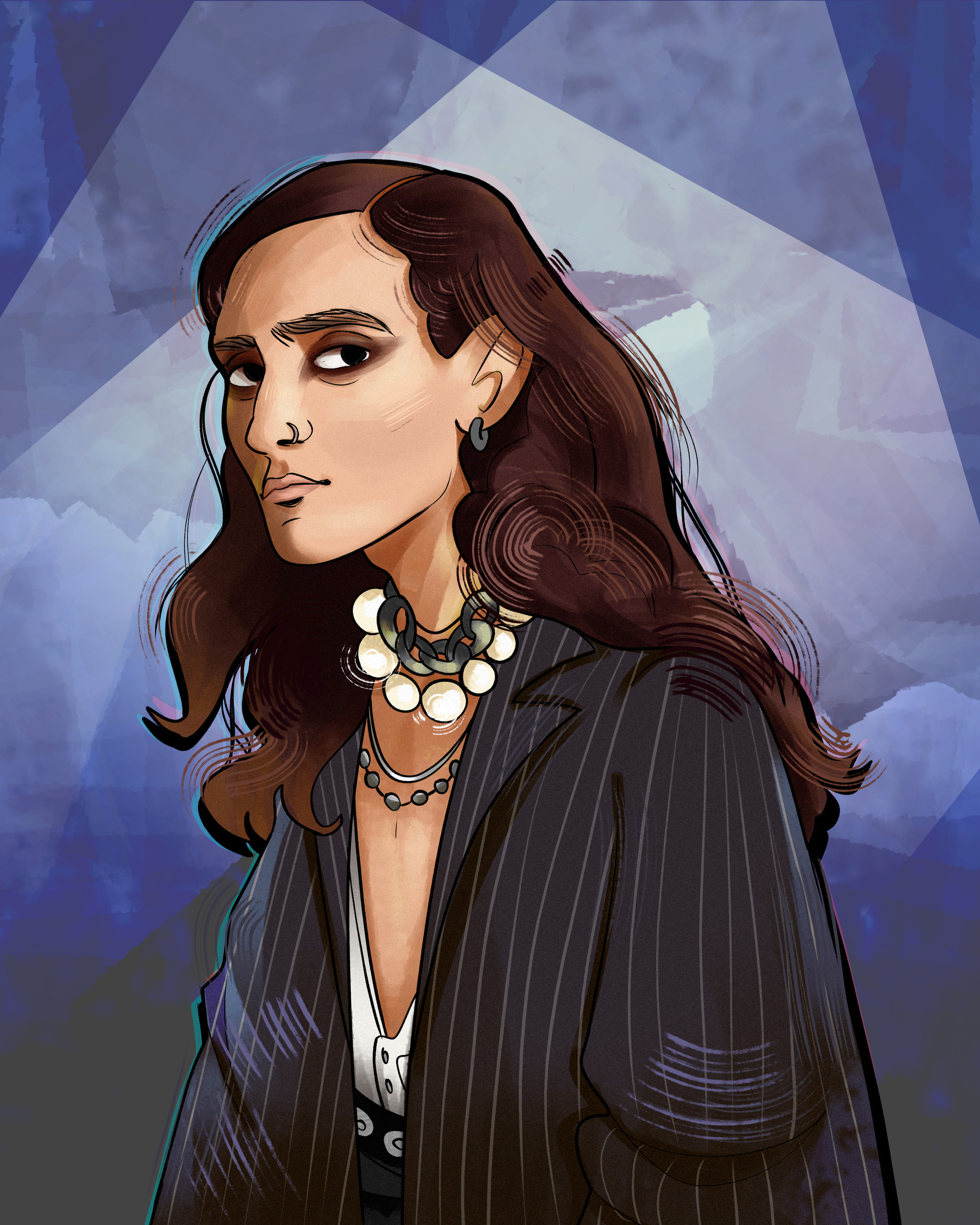
- Born: 2000 (age 25–26); Funchal, Portugal
- Occupations: Singer-songwriter; musician

João Diogo Santos Borges (European Portuguese pronunciation: [ʒuˈɐ̃w diˈoɣu ˈsɐ̃tuʒ ˈβɔɾʒɨʃ]; born 2000), known professionally as João Borsch (pronounced [ʒuˈɐ̃w ˈbɔɾʃ]), is a Portuguese singer, songwriter and musician. They competed in Festival da Canção 2024.

== Early life ==
Borges was born in Funchal, Madeira, Portugal, in 2000. They were the drummer in a local trash metal band during their childhood and became regional champion in the game Guitar Hero. In 2018, they moved to Lisbon to study Jazz and Modern Music at Lusíada University.

== Career ==
In 2021, Borges released their debut album Uma noite romântica com João Borsch under their pseudonym. Their second full-length album, É só harakiri, baby, was released in 2023.

Borsch performed at the Paredes de Coura Festival in 2022 and the NOS Alive festival in 2023, among others.

They were invited by RTP to compete in Festival da Canção 2024, the Portuguese selection for the Eurovision Song Contest 2024, entering the competition with the self-penned song "...Pelas costuras"; they performed in the first semi-final and qualified for the final, where they won the public vote but ultimately came second behind Iolanda.

== Personal life ==
João Borges has an older brother and used to work in musical projects with him since an early age. They are vegetarian. They chose the pseudonym Borsch because there was already a Brazilian singer called João Borges and they liked the sonority and visual aspect of the word to replace their surname. They identify as non-binary.
