= Elisa Silva =

Portuguese singer

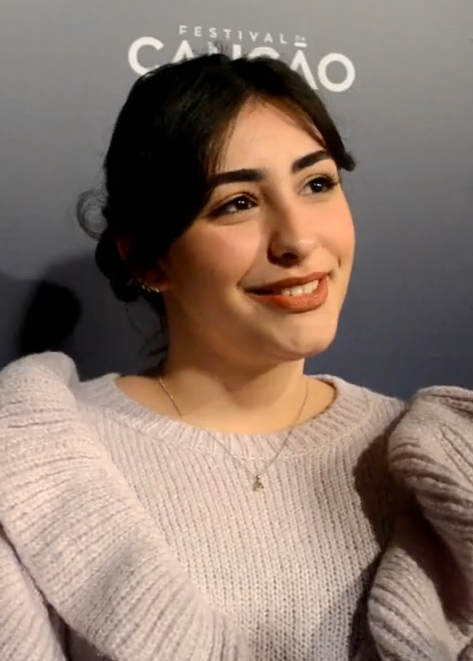
- Silva in 2020

Background information
- Born: Maria Elisa Silva; 7 May 1999 (age 27)
- Origin: Ponta do Sol, Madeira, Portugal
- Genres: Pop; Jazz
- Occupation: Singer
- Instrument: Vocals
- Years active: 2019–present
- Label: Universal Music Portugal

Maria Elisa Silva (born 7 May 1999), known simply as Elisa, is a Portuguese singer from Ponta do Sol, Madeira. She won Festival da Canção 2020 and would have represented Portugal in the Eurovision Song Contest 2020 held in Rotterdam, Netherlands with the song "Medo de sentir", but was cancelled due to the COVID-19 pandemic.

On 28 April 2021, it was announced that Elisa would be the spokesperson for Portugal announcing the countries points in the final of Eurovision Song Contest 2021.

== Discography ==
=== Studio albums ===
Title	Album details
No Meu Canto	Released: 12 November 2021; Label: Warner Music Portugal; Format: CD, digital download, streaming

=== Singles ===
Title	Year	Album
"Medo de sentir"	2020	Non-album single
"Coração"	2020	No Meu Canto
"Na Ilha"	2021	No Meu Canto
"Este Meu Jeito"	2021	No Meu Canto
"Se Não Me Amas"	2021	No Meu Canto

Preceded by Conan Osiris with "Telemóveis"	Portugal in the Eurovision Song Contest; 2020 (cancelled)	Succeeded by The Black Mamba with "Love Is on My Side"
