= !! =

‼ (a double exclamation mark, Unicode character U+203C) may refer to:

- !! (chess), a symbol in chess annotation for outstanding or particularly strong moves
- Double factorial, an operator in mathematics
- Retroflex click, a family of click consonants found only in Juu and Namibian languages, and in the Damin ritual jargon
- Double-negation translation, !!p = p

== See also ==
- ! (disambiguation)
- !!! (disambiguation)
