= Filipa Carmo da Silva =

South African singer-songwriter

Filipa
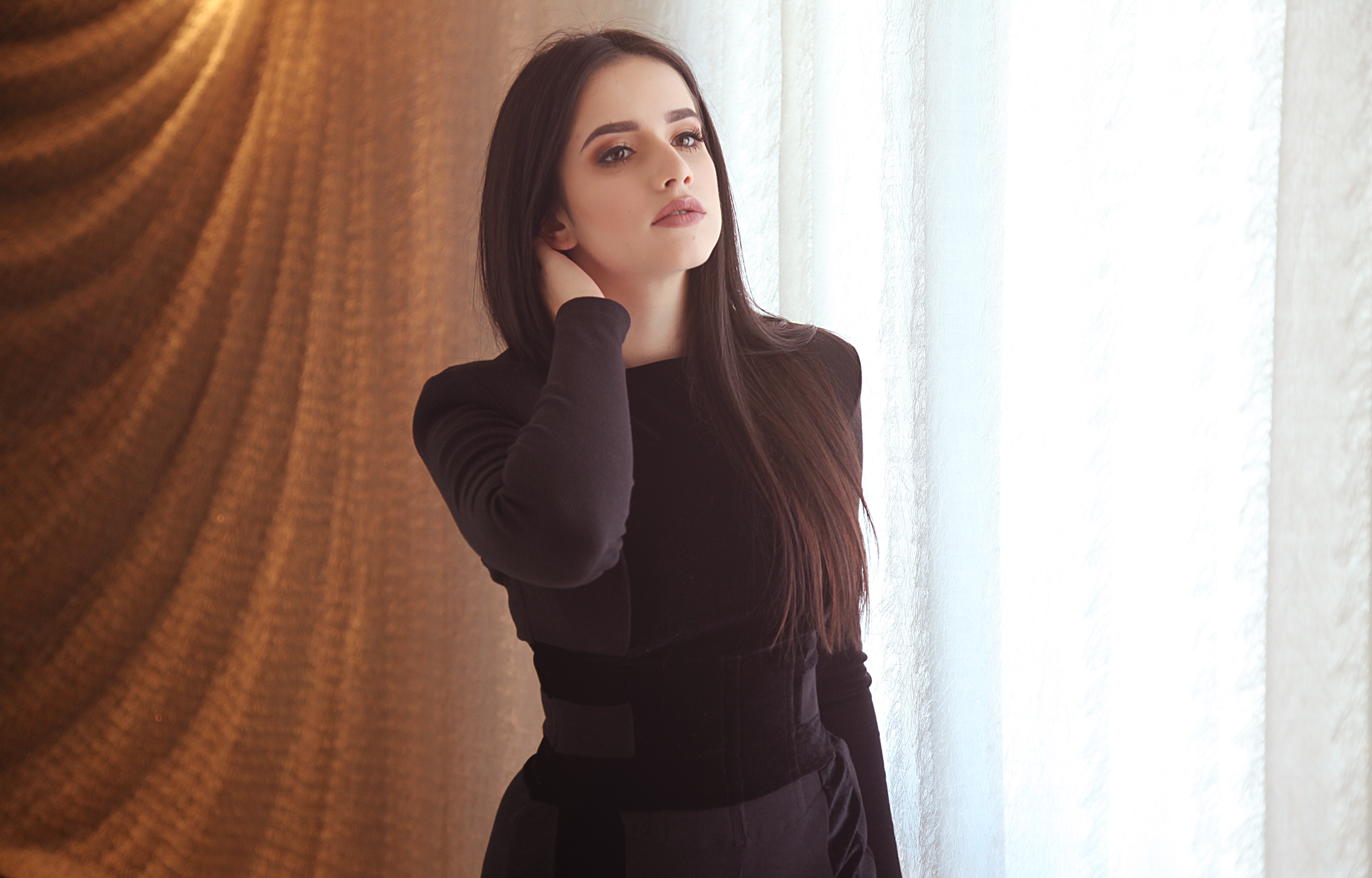
- Filipa in 2017

Background information
- Also known as: Filipa
- Born: Filipa Alexandra Carmo da Silva; 1995 (age 30–31); Johannesburg, South Africa
- Genres: Pop
- Occupation: Singer-songwriter
- Instrument: Vocals
- Years active: 2008–present
- Label: Haven Music
- Website: www.filipamusic.com

Filipa Alexandra Carmo da Silva (born 1995), also known mononymously as Filipa, is a South African singer and songwriter.

She won Ryan Seacrest's cover song competition for her rendition of One Direction's song "Story of My Life", after five rounds of the competition, with a Pearl Harbor-themed music video directed by Kyle White, finishing ahead of Jedward and Josh Levi.

She has since worked with songwriters and producers in the United States, including Pam Sheyne. She collaborated with Sheyne on the song "Little White Lie", which was released in 2016.

She received Glamour's Women of the Year Next Big Thing Award in 2014, as well as a nomination for Cosmopolitan's Awesome Women.

She was selected by RTP to compete in Festival da Canção 2024, the Portuguese selection for the Eurovision Song Contest 2024. On 18 January 2024, it was announced that her entry would be "You Can't Hide".
