= !!! (disambiguation) =

!!! is a dance-punk band formed in 1996.

!!! may also refer to:

- !!! (album), the debut album by the band !!!
- A tour cassette produced by the band !!!
- Exclamation mark emphasis form by triplication
- Est! Est!! Est!!! di Montefiascone, an Italian wine region

== See also ==
- !! (disambiguation)
- ! (disambiguation)
