= Medo de sentir =

2020 single by Elisa Silva

Single by Elisa Silva
- Released: 2020
- Length: 2:51
- Label: Universal Music Portugal
- Songwriter: Marta Carvalho

Elisa Silva singles chronology
"Medo de sentir" (2020)	"Coração" (2020)

Eurovision Song Contest 2020 entry
- Country: Portugal
- Artist: Elisa Silva
- Language: Portuguese
- Composer: Marta Carvalho
- Lyricist: Marta Carvalho

Finals performance
- Semi-final result: Contest cancelled

Entry chronology
- ◄ "Telemóveis" (2019)
- "Love Is on My Side" (2021) ►

"Medo de sentir" (Portuguese pronunciation: [ˈmeðu ðɨ sẽˈtiɾ]; English: "Afraid of feeling", literally "Fear of feeling") is a song performed by Portuguese singer Elisa Silva and written by Portuguese singer-songwriter Marta Carvalho. It would have represented Portugal in the Eurovision Song Contest 2020 in Rotterdam, Netherlands.

== Eurovision Song Contest ==
The song was selected to represent Portugal in the Eurovision Song Contest 2020, after Elisa Silva was selected through Festival da Canção 2020, the music competition that selects Portugal's entries for the Eurovision Song Contest. On 28 January 2020, a special allocation draw was held which placed each country into one of the two semi-finals, as well as which half of the show they would perform in. Portugal was placed into the second semi-final, set to be held on 14 May 2020, and was scheduled to perform in the second half of the show.
