= ! (Cláudia Pascoal album) =

Studio album by Cláudia Pascoal
- Released: 27 March 2020
- Length: 35:33
- Label: Universal Music Portugal

Singles from !
- 1. "Ter e Não Ter" Released: 29 March 2019; 2. "Viver" Released: 6 December 2019; 3. "Espalha Brasas" Released: 6 March 2020

! (pronounced "blah") is the debut studio album by Portuguese singer Cláudia Pascoal. It was released in Portugal on 27 March 2020 by Universal Music Portugal. The album peaked at number six on the Portuguese Albums Chart.

== Background and recording ==
Following her participation in the Eurovision Song Contest in 2018, Cláudia Pascoal began work on her debut studio album. The recording process took place over two years in collaboration with Portuguese singer-songwriter and producer Tiago Bettencourt. She described the album as a highly personal and expressive project, explaining she wanted it to reflect her identity outside of television formats and interpretation of the songs of other artists. Additional contributions came from musicians such as David Fonseca, Samuel Úria, and Nuno Markl, though Pascoal emphasized that she reinterpreted their work to suit her own voice. The album also tries to lighten up serious matters as a coping mechanism.

== Release and promotion ==
The album was released on 27 March 2020, during the covid pandemic by Universal Music Portugal, both digitally and in physical formats. In the lead-up to the release, Pascoal introduced the fictional character "Blá" to promote the album.

Region	Date	Format	Label
Portugal	27 March 2020	Digital download; streaming	Universal Music Portugal

== Personnel ==
The album was produced by Tiago Bettencourt, who also contributed to songwriting and arrangement. Additional songwriting and instrumental contributions came from David Fonseca, Samuel Úria, Nuno Markl, and Amarante. Despite the collaborative nature of the project, Pascoal maintained that all tracks were filtered through her own creative lens.

== Track listing ==
No.	Title	Length
1.	"PPPFFFRRR" (with Nuno Markl)	0:51
2.	"Mais Fica Pra Mim" (with Nuno Markl)	2:37
3.	"Espalha Brasas"	3:15
4.	"Quase Dança"	2:59
5.	"Ter E Não Ter"	2:40
6.	"Viver" (featuring Samuel Úria)	3:18
7.	"Já Não Somos Animais"	3:14
8.	"Vem Também"	4:10
9.	"Espero Por Ti Lá Fora"	3:03
10.	"Tanto Faz"	3:15
11.	"O Soldado"	3:28
12.	"Música De Um Acorde"	2:43

== Charts ==
Chart (2020)	Peak position
Portuguese Albums (AFP)	6
