= Portugal in the Eurovision Song Contest 2018 =

- Eurovision Song Contest 2018
- Participating broadcaster: Rádio e Televisão de Portugal (RTP)
- Country: Portugal
- Selection process: Festival da Canção 2018
- Selection date: 4 March 2018

Competing entry
- Song: "O jardim"
- Artist: Cláudia Pascoal
- Songwriters: Isaura

Placement
- Final result: 26th (last), 39 points

Participation chronology

Portugal was represented at the Eurovision Song Contest 2018 with the song "O jardim", written by Isaura and performed by Cláudia Pascoal. The Portuguese participating broadcaster, Rádio e Televisão de Portugal (RTP), organised the national final Festival da Canção 2018 in order to select its entry for the contest. In addition, RTP was also the host broadcaster and staged the event at the Lisbon Arena in Lisbon, after winning the previous edition with the song "Amar pelos dois" performed by Salvador Sobral. After two semi-finals and a final which took place in February and March 2018, "O jardim" performed by Cláudia Pascoal and featuring Isaura emerged as the winner of the Festival da Canção 2018 after achieving the highest score following the combination of votes from seven regional juries and a public televote.

As the host country, Portugal qualified to compete directly in the final of the Eurovision Song Contest. Portugal's running order position was determined by draw. Performing in position 8 during the final, Portugal placed twenty-sixth (last) out of the 26 participating countries with 39 points.

== Background ==
Prior to the 2018 contest, Radiotelevisão Portuguesa (RTP) until 2003, and Rádio e Televisão de Portugal (RTP) since 2004, have participated in the Eurovision Song Contest representing Portugal forty-nine times since their first entry in 1964. They had won the contest on one occasion: in 2017 with the song "Amar pelos dois" performed by Salvador Sobral. Following the introduction of semi-finals for 2004, They had featured in only four finals. Their least successful result has been last place, which they have achieved on three occasions, most recently in 1997 with the song "Antes do adeus" performed by Célia Lawson. They has also received nul points on two occasions; in 1964 and 1997.

As part of its duties as participating broadcaster, RTP organises the selection of its entry in the Eurovision Song Contest and broadcasts the event in the country. The broadcaster has traditionally selected its entry for the contest via the music competition Festival da Canção, with exceptions in 1988 and 2005 when the entries were internally selected. On 25 July 2017, RTP revealed details regarding its selection procedure and announced the organization of Festival da Canção 2018 in order to select its 2018 entry.

== Before Eurovision ==
=== Festival da Canção 2018 ===
The official logotype of Festival da Canção 2018.

Festival da Canção 2018 was the 52nd edition of Festival da Canção, the national final organised by RTP to select its entry for the Eurovision Song Contest 2018. Twenty-six entries competed in the competition that consisted of two semi-finals held on 18 and 25 February 2018 leading to a fourteen-song final on 4 March 2018. All three shows of the competition were broadcast on RTP1, RTP África, and RTP Internacional as well as on radio via Antena 1 and online via RTP Play with commentary by Joana Martins and Rita Correia. For the first time in the history of the competition, the shows were broadcast on RTP Acessibilidades with Sofia Figueiredo and Cláudia Dias presenting in Portuguese Sign Language.

==== Format ====
The format of the competition consisted of three shows: two semi-finals on 18 and 25 February 2018 and the final on 4 March 2018. Each semi-final featured thirteen competing entries from which seven advanced from each show to complete the fourteen song lineup in the final. Results during the semi-finals were determined by the 50/50 combination of votes from a jury panel appointed by RTP and public televoting, while results during the final were determined by the 50/50 combination of votes from seven regional juries and public televoting, which was opened following the second semi-final and closed during the final show. Both the public televote and the juries assigned points from 1-8, 10 and 12 based on the ranking developed by both streams of voting.

==== Competing entries ====
Twenty-six composers were selected by RTP through four methods: twenty-two nominated by journalist and music critic Nuno Galopim and Antena 3 presenter Henrique Amaro and invited by RTP for the competition, two selected from 346 submissions received through an open call for songs, one personally invited by the Festival da Canção 2017 winner Salvador Sobral and one selected from the Antena 1 radio show MasterClass featuring composers without any published work. The composers, who created the songs and selected the performers, were required to submit the final versions of their entries by 31 December 2017. Songs could be submitted in any language. The selected composers were revealed on 27 September 2017, while the competing artists were revealed on 18 January 2018. Among the competing artists were José Cid, who represented Portugal in 1980 and 1998 (the latter as part of the group Alma Lusa) and Anabela, who represented Portugal in 1993.

Artist	Song	Songwriter(s)	Selection
Anabela	"P'ra te dar abrigo"	Fernando Tordo, Tiago Torres da Silva	Invited by RTP
Beatriz Pessoa	"Eu te amo"	Mallu Magalhães	Invited by RTP
Bruno Vasconcelos	"Austrália"	Nuno Rafael, Samuel Úria	Invited by RTP
Catarina Miranda	"Para sorrir eu não preciso de nada"	Júlio Resende, Camila Ferraro	Invited by RTP
Cláudia Pascoal	"O jardim"	Isaura	Invited by RTP
Daniela Onís	"P'ra lá do rio"	Daniela Onís	MasterClass winner
David Pessoa	"Amor veloz"	Francisco Rebelo, Márcio Silva	Invited by RTP
Diogo Piçarra	"Canção do fim"	Diogo Piçarra	Invited by RTP
Dora Fidalgo	"Arco-íris (Assim cantou Zaratustra)"	Miguel Ângelo	Invited by RTP
Janeiro	"(Sem título)"	Janeiro	Invited by Salvador Sobral
Joana Barra Vaz	"Anda estragar-me os planos"	Francisca Cortesão, Afonso Cabral	Invited by RTP
Joana Espadinha	"Zero a zero"	Benjamim	Invited by RTP
José Cid	"O som da guitarra é a alma de um povo"	José Cid	Invited by RTP
JP Simões	"Alvoroço"	JP Simões	Invited by RTP
Lili	"O vôo das cegonhas"	Armando Teixeira	Invited by RTP
Maria Amaral	"A mesma canção"	Paulo Praça, Nuno Miguel Guedes	Invited by RTP
Maria Inês Paris	"Bandeira azul"	Tito Paris, Pierre Aderne	Invited by RTP
Minni and Rhayra	"Patati patata"	Paulo Flores	Invited by RTP
Peter Serrado	"Sunset"	Peter Serrado	Open call winner
Peu Madureira	"Só por ela"	Diogo Clemente	Invited by RTP
Rita Dias	"Com gosto amigo"	Rita Dias, Filipe Almeida	Open call winner
Rita Ruivo	"Anda daí"	João Afonso, José Moz Carrapa	Invited by RTP
Rui David	"Sem medo"	Jorge Palma	Invited by RTP
Sequin	"All Over Again"	Bruno Cardoso	Invited by RTP
Susana Travassos	"Mensageira"	Aline Frazão	Invited by RTP
Tamin	"Sobre nós"	Capicua, Luís Montenegro, João Rodrigues, Sérgio Alves	Invited by RTP

==== Semi-finals ====
The two semi-finals took place at RTP's Studio 1 in Lisbon on 18 and 25 February 2018. The first semi-final was hosted by Jorge Gabriel and José Carlos Malato while the second semi-final was hosted by Sónia Araújo and Tânia Ribas de Oliveira. In each semi-final thirteen entries competed and seven advanced to the final based on the 50/50 combination of votes from a jury panel consisting of Júlio Isidro, Ana Bacalhau, Ana Markl, António Avelar de Pinho, Carlão, Luísa Sobral, Mário Lopes, Sara Tavares and Tozé Brito, and a public televote. Following the first semi-final, a mistake with the televoting results was detected and corrected following the show. Diogo Piçarra, who qualified from the second semi-final, withdrew his song "Canção do fim" from the final on 27 February 2018 following plagiarism accusations. The entry was replaced with the song "Mensageira", performed by Susana Travassos, which placed eighth in the second semi-final.

In addition to the performances of the competing entries, João Pedro Coimbra and Nuno Figueiredo performed as the interval act in the first semi-final, while Herman José performed as the interval act in the second semi-final.

Semi-final 1 – 18 February 2018
R/O	Artist	Song	Jury	Televote	Total	Place
1	Bruno Vasconcelos	"Austrália"	0	0	0	13
2	Rui David	"Sem medo"	2	5	7	7
3	Beatriz Pessoa	"Eu te amo"	4	0	4	11
4	Anabela	"P'ra te dar abrigo"	3	10	13	4
5	Catarina Miranda	"Para sorrir eu não preciso de nada"	8	8	16	3
6	Joana Espadinha	"Zero a zero"	5	2	7	6
7	Janeiro	"(Sem título)"	12	4	16	2
8	José Cid	"O som da guitarra é a alma de um povo"	1	6	7	8
9	Joana Barra Vaz	"Anda estragar-me os planos"	7	1	8	5
10	Peu Madureira	"Só por ela"	10	12	22	1
11	Rita Dias	"Com gosto amigo"	0	3	3	12
12	JP Simões	"Alvoroço"	6	0	6	10
13	Maria Amaral	"A mesma canção"	0	7	7	9

Semi-final 2 – 25 February 2018
R/O	Artist	Song	Jury	Televote	Total	Place
1	Maria Inês Paris	"Bandeira azul"	7	5	12	3
2	Dora Fidalgo	"Arco-íris (Assim cantou Zaratustra)"	0	0	0	12
3	Sequin	"All Over Again"	0	0	0	12
4	~~Diogo Piçarra~~	~~"Canção do fim"~~	~~12~~	~~12~~	~~24~~	~~1~~
5	David Pessoa	"Amor veloz"	5	4	9	6
6	Tamin	"Sobre nós"	6	2	8	9
7	Cláudia Pascoal	"O jardim"	10	10	20	2
8	Minnie and Rhayra	"Patati patata"	4	6	10	4
9	Rita Ruivo	"Anda daí"	0	1	1	11
10	Susana Travassos	"Mensageira"	8	0	8	8
11	Lili	"O vôo das cegonhas"	3	7	10	5
12	Daniela Onís	"P'ra lá do rio"	2	3	5	10
13	Peter Serrado	"Sunset"	1	8	9	7

==== Final ====
The final took place at the Pavilhão Multiusos in Guimarães on 4 March 2018, hosted by Filomena Cautela and Pedro Fernandes. The fourteen entries that qualified from the two preceding semi-finals competed and the winner, "O jardim" performed by Cláudia Pascoal, was selected based on the 50/50 combination of votes of seven regional juries and a public televote. In addition to the performances of the competing entries, Luísa Sobral, Simone de Oliveira (who represented Portugal in 1965 and 1969), and Doce (who represented Portugal in 1982), performed as the interval acts. Catarina Miranda and Cláudia Pascoal were both tied at 22 points each but since Cláudia Pascoal received more votes from the public she was declared the winner.

Final – 4 March 2018
R/O	Artist	Song	Jury	Televote	Total	Place
1	Rui David	"Sem medo"	4	4	8	5
2	Susana Travassos	"Mensageira"	4	0	4	10
3	Peter Serrado	"Sunset"	0	3	3	11
4	Joana Espadinha	"Zero a zero"	5	0	5	9
5	Lili	"O vôo das cegonhas"	1	5	6	8
6	Catarina Miranda	"Para sorrir eu não preciso de nada"	12	10	22	2
7	Joana Barra Vaz	"Anda estragar-me os planos"	7	0	7	7
8	David Pessoa	"Amor veloz"	0	0	0	14
9	Minnie and Rhayra	"Patati patata"	0	2	2	13
10	Janeiro	"(Sem título)"	6	6	12	4
11	Maria Inês Paris	"Bandeira azul"	2	1	3	12
12	Anabela	"Para te dar abrigo"	0	7	7	6
13	Cláudia Pascoal	"O jardim"	10	12	22	1
14	Peu Madureira	"Só por ela"	8	8	16	3

Detailed regional jury votes
R/O	Song	North	Central	Lisbon Area	Alentejo	Algarve	Azores	Madeira	Total	Points
1	"Sem medo"	3	5	5	2		3	1	19	4
2	"A mensageira"	5		2	1	3	4	4	19	4
3	"Sunset"	1	6						7	0
4	"Zero a zero"	2	1	4			8	7	22	5
5	"O vôo das cegonhas"		2	7	4		2		15	1
6	"Para sorrir eu não preciso de nada"	8	12	12	12	8	7	12	71	12
7	"Anda estragar-me os planos"	6	4	8	7	6	10	10	51	7
8	"Amor veloz"			1		5			6	0
9	"Patati patata"					2			2	0
10	"(Sem título)"	7	8		6	7	12	8	48	6
11	"Bandeira azul"	4			5	4	1	2	16	2
12	"Para te dar abrigo"		3	3	3	1		3	13	0
13	"O jardim"	10	10	10	10	12	6	5	63	10
14	"Só por ela"	12	7	6	8	10	5	6	54	8
Members of the jury
North: Tiago Novo, Pedro Gonçalves, Valter Hugo Mãe; Central: Adelaide Ferreira, André Sardet, David Fonseca; Lisbon Area: João Carlos Calixto, António Manuel Ribeiro, Marta Hugon; Alentejo: Cristina Branco, Jorge Benvinda, João Adelino Faria; Algarve: Gil Silva, Nuno Guerreiro, Viviane Parra; Azores: Pedro Lucas, Herberto Quaresma, Tiago Ribeiro; Madeira: Pedro Azevedo, Vânia Fernandes, Joana Machado

=== Promotion ===
Prior to the contest, Cláudia Pascoal specifically promoted "O jardim" as the Portuguese Eurovision entry on 21 April 2018 by performing during the ESPreParty event which was held at the Sala La Riviera venue in Madrid, Spain and hosted by Soraya Arnelas.

== At Eurovision ==
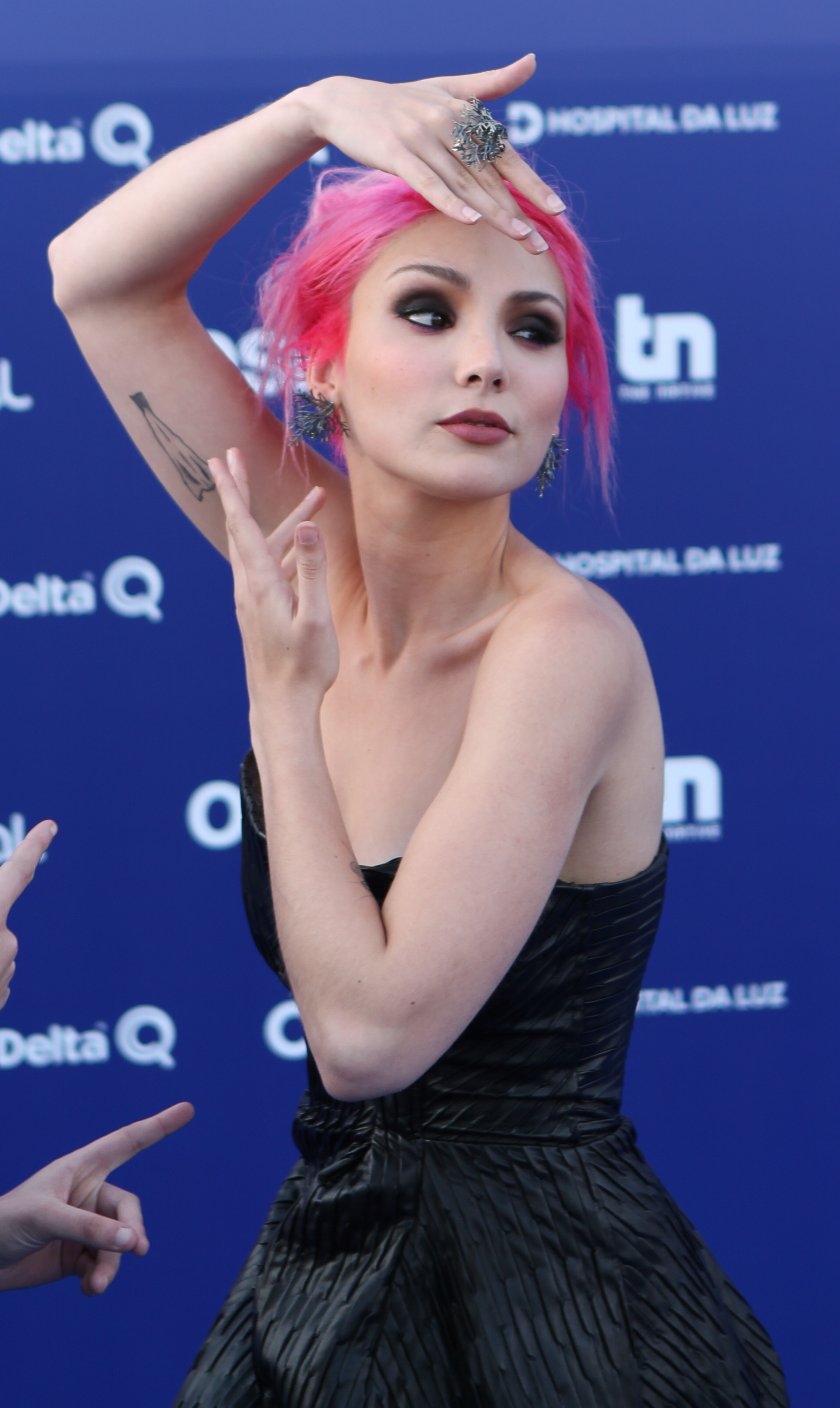
Cláudia Pascoal at the 2018 Eurovision Blue Carpet event

All countries except the "Big Five" (France, Germany, Italy, Spain, and the United Kingdom) and the host country, are required to qualify from one of two semi-finals in order to compete for the final; the top ten countries from each semi-final progress to the final. As the host country, Portugal automatically qualified to compete in the final on 12 May 2018. In addition to their participation in the final, Portugal is also required to broadcast and vote in one of the two semi-finals, which was decided via a draw held during the semi-final allocation draw on 29 January 2018. Portugal was assigned to broadcast and vote in the first semi-final, to be held on 8 May 2018.

In Portugal, the three shows were broadcast on RTP1, RTP África, and RTP Internacional with commentary by Nuno Galopim and Hélder Reis. The final was also broadcast via radio on Antena 1, RDP África, and RDP Internacional with commentary by Noémia Gonçalves, António Macedo and Tozé Brito. RTP appointed Pedro Fernandes as its spokesperson to announce the top 12-point score awarded by the Portuguese jury during the final.

=== Final ===
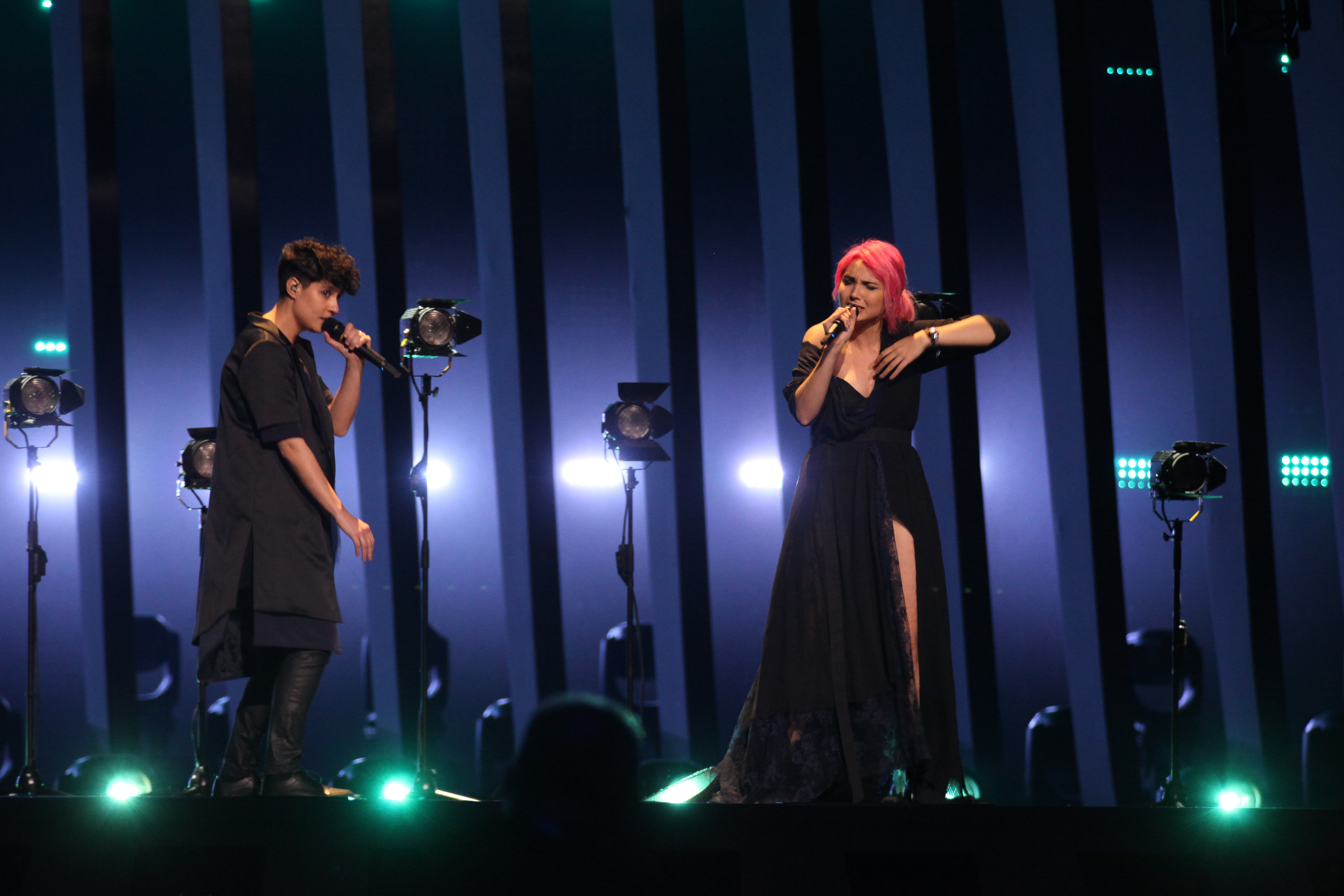
Isaura and Cláudia Pascoal during a rehearsal before the final

Cláudia Pascoal took part in technical rehearsals on 4 and 6 May, followed by dress rehearsals on 7, 11 and 12 May. This included the semi-final jury show on 7 May where an extended clip of the Portuguese performance was filmed for broadcast during the live show on 8 May and the jury final on 11 May where the professional juries of each country watched and voted on the competing entries. As the host nation, Portugal's running order position in the final was decided through a random draw that took place during the Heads of Delegation meeting in Lisbon on 12 March 2018. Portugal was drawn to perform in position 8. Following the second semi-final, the shows' producers decided upon the running order of the final rather than through another draw, so that similar songs were not placed next to each other. While Portugal had already been drawn to perform in position 8, it was determined that Portugal would perform following Norway and before the entry from United Kingdom.

The Portuguese performance featured Cláudia Pascoal wearing a black dress and surrounded by gold lights, which increase in number throughout the performance, performing together with the composer of "O jardim" Isaura who was later revealed to be standing beside Pascoal by an overhead spotlight. Portugal placed twenty-sixth (last) in the final, scoring 39 points: 18 points from the televoting and 21 points from the juries.

=== Voting ===
Voting during the three shows involved each country awarding two sets of points from 1-8, 10 and 12: one from their professional jury and the other from televoting. Each nation's jury consisted of five music industry professionals who are citizens of the country they represent, with their names published before the contest to ensure transparency. This jury judged each entry based on: vocal capacity; the stage performance; the song's composition and originality; and the overall impression by the act. In addition, no member of a national jury was permitted to be related in any way to any of the competing acts in such a way that they cannot vote impartially and independently. The individual rankings of each jury member as well as the nation's televoting results were released shortly after the grand final.

Below is a breakdown of points awarded to Portugal and awarded by Portugal in the first semi-final and grand final of the contest, and the breakdown of the jury voting and televoting conducted during the two shows:

==== Points awarded to Portugal ====
Points awarded to Portugal (Final)
Score	Televote	Jury
12 points		
10 points	Switzerland	
8 points	France	
7 points		Lithuania
6 points		Ireland
5 points		
4 points		
3 points		Estonia; Switzerland
2 points		Netherlands
1 point		

==== Points awarded by Portugal ====
Points awarded by Portugal (Semi-final 1)
Score	Televote	Jury
12 points	Estonia	Lithuania
10 points	Cyprus	Belgium
8 points	Ireland	Estonia
7 points	Azerbaijan	Bulgaria
6 points	Lithuania	Austria
5 points	Austria	Albania
4 points	Finland	Armenia
3 points	Switzerland	Czech Republic
2 points	Israel	Israel
1 point	Czech Republic	Croatia

Points awarded by Portugal (Final)
Score	Televote	Jury
12 points	Spain	Estonia
10 points	Italy	Albania
8 points	Germany	Austria
7 points	Estonia	Bulgaria
6 points	Moldova	Lithuania
5 points	Cyprus	France
4 points	Ukraine	Italy
3 points	Ireland	Slovenia
2 points	Denmark	Spain
1 point	Israel	Israel

==== Detailed voting results ====
The following members comprised the Portuguese jury:

- Armando Teixeira (jury chairperson) – composer, singer, producer
- Daniela Rute Rodrigues (Daniela Onis) – composer, singer
- Anabela Braz Pires (Anabela) – singer, actress, represented Portugal in 1993
- Luis Manuel Oliveira Nunes (Benjamim) – composer, producer
- Pedro Lopes Madureira Silva Miguel (Peu Madureira) – singer

Detailed voting results from Portugal (Semi-final 1)
R/O	Country	Jury							Televote	
R/O	Country	A. Teixeira	D. Onis	Anabela	Benjamim	P. Madureira	Rank	Points	Rank	Points
01	Azerbaijan	18	13	19	19	18	19		4	7
02	Iceland	19	19	14	13	14	16		16	
03	Albania	9	5	3	9	4	6	5	15	
04	Belgium	2	1	5	3	2	2	10	12	
05	Czech Republic	8	8	7	7	7	8	3	10	1
06	Lithuania	6	2	1	1	1	1	12	5	6
07	Israel	7	9	8	6	10	9	2	9	2
08	Belarus	14	18	15	15	13	14		13	
09	Estonia	1	3	4	2	3	3	8	1	12
10	Bulgaria	3	7	2	5	5	4	7	14	
11	Macedonia	17	16	16	17	16	17		19	
12	Croatia	13	12	13	8	9	10	1	18	
13	Austria	5	6	6	4	6	5	6	6	5
14	Greece	11	10	11	14	11	11		11	
15	Finland	16	14	18	18	19	18		7	4
16	Armenia	4	4	9	11	8	7	4	17	
17	Switzerland	15	11	10	12	12	12		8	3
18	Ireland	10	17	12	10	15	13		3	8
19	Cyprus	12	15	17	16	17	15		2	10

Detailed voting results from Portugal (Final)
R/O	Country	Jury							Televote	
R/O	Country	A. Teixeira	D. Onis	Anabela	Benjamim	P. Madureira	Rank	Points	Rank	Points
01	Ukraine	14	13	15	20	18	16		7	4
02	Spain	13	9	7	11	10	9	2	1	12
03	Slovenia	4	3	16	6	11	8	3	24	
04	Lithuania	6	6	4	2	3	5	6	13	
05	Austria	3	7	2	4	5	3	8	11	
06	Estonia	1	2	5	1	4	1	12	4	7
07	Norway	24	24	17	24	24	23		17	
08	Portugal									
09	United Kingdom	20	20	19	21	14	20		16	
10	Serbia	15	23	21	22	20	21		25	
11	Germany	16	12	18	16	8	14		3	8
12	Albania	7	1	1	10	6	2	10	23	
13	France	5	5	6	8	1	6	5	12	
14	Czech Republic	19	16	11	12	9	13		15	
15	Denmark	22	22	23	23	23	24		9	2
16	Australia	12	14	9	15	13	12		14	
17	Finland	18	18	20	18	15	18		22	
18	Bulgaria	2	4	3	5	7	4	7	21	
19	Moldova	25	25	25	25	25	25		5	6
20	Sweden	23	21	22	19	19	22		19	
21	Hungary	17	19	24	14	22	19		18	
22	Israel	9	10	13	7	16	10	1	10	1
23	Netherlands	21	17	14	13	21	17		20	
24	Ireland	10	11	12	9	12	11		8	3
25	Cyprus	11	15	10	17	17	15		6	5
26	Italy	8	8	8	3	2	7	4	2	10
