= Leo Middea =

Brazilian singer-songwriter (born 1995)

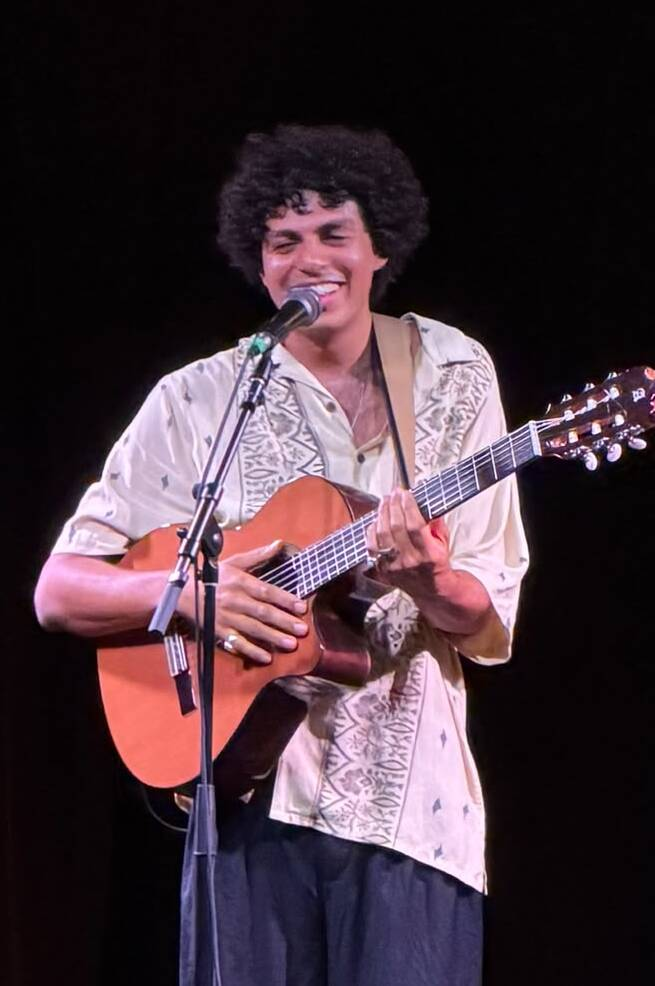
- Leo Middea in Toronto in 2026

Background information
- Born: Leonardo Middea de Jesus; 27 April 1995 (age 31); Taquara, Rio de Janeiro, Brazil
- Genres: MPB; Bossa nova; Samba; Folk
- Occupations: Singer; songwriter; instrumentalist
- Instruments: Vocals; guitar
- Years active: 2014–present
- Website: leomiddea.com

Leonardo Middea de Jesus (born 27 April 1995), known professionally as Leo Middea, is a Brazilian MPB singer-songwriter and instrumentalist from Rio de Janeiro. Known for blending traditional Brazilian rhythms such as bossa nova, samba, and folk with contemporary international influences, he has released six studio albums and performed in over 18 countries. In 2024, he became the first Brazilian artist to reach the final of Portugal's Festival da Canção.

== Early life ==
Middea was born on 27 April 1995 in Taquara, in the suburbs of Rio de Janeiro. He grew up in a musically inclined family; his maternal grandparents performed on local live radio shows, while his paternal grandparents were known for their vocal harmonies. He taught himself the violão (acoustic guitar) at the age of 14, focusing on Brazilian folk music and bossa nova. At 17, he furthered his technical development through classical guitar studies under renowned Brazilian professor Henrique Pinto, attending guitar symposiums, workshops, and masterclasses.

His early musical influences included Gilberto Gil, Caetano Veloso, and Jorge Ben Jor, as well as the broader tradition of Tropicália and samba-canção.

== Career ==
=== Early career and Dois (2014–2019) ===
Middea launched his musical career in 2014 with his debut studio album Dois, released when he was 19 years old. That same year, at the age of 18, he embarked on his first international tour with approximately 23 concerts across Argentina. His second studio album, A Dança do Mundo, was released in 2016. During this period, he built a grassroots following through extensive touring in Brazil and South America.

=== Move to Europe and Vicentina / Beleza Isolar (2019–2022) ===
In 2017, Middea relocated to Lisbon, Portugal, initially performing on the streets and in bars. In 2020, he released two studio albums: Vicentina, produced in Lisbon and named after a woman who had predicted when he was just four years old that he would become a musician, and Beleza Isolar, recorded during the COVID-19 pandemic and reflecting on the isolation and transformation of that period. The latter was produced in collaboration with Brazilian-Dutch producer Breno Virícimo, whom Middea met in Amsterdam.

In 2022, Middea was invited to open two concerts for French singer Sheila at the Salle Pleyel in Paris, performing before audiences of 2,000. He was also invited by the Prime Minister of Portugal to perform at the official concert commemorating the Bicentennial of Brazil's Independence.

=== Gente and international breakthrough (2023–2024) ===
In June 2023, Middea released his fifth studio album, Gente, produced in Amsterdam with Breno Virícimo. The album features a guest appearance by Brazilian singer Mallu Magalhães on the track "Borboleta Efeito", as well as contributions from Curandeira and Béesau. Gente reached one million streams within a month of its release. The album was described by critics as his most mature and danceable work to date, incorporating electronic elements, percussions recorded in São Paulo, and female choruses inspired by 1960s and 1970s MPB.

In 2024, Middea became the first Brazilian artist to reach the final of Portugal's Festival da Canção, finishing as runner-up. His eligibility to compete stemmed from having obtained Portuguese citizenship following several years of residency in the country. That same year, he received the Prémio Embaixadores in the Music category, recognising his role in promoting Brazilian and Portuguese culture across Europe. He also performed at the Montreux Jazz Festival and completed over 100 concerts across multiple countries in that year alone.

=== Notícias de Puglia (2025–present) ===
Middea's sixth studio album, Notícias de Puglia, was composed and recorded on the road during his extensive touring schedule. By 2026, he had performed in over 18 countries and accumulated over 20 million streams on Spotify.

== Artistry ==
Middea's music blends MPB, bossa nova, samba, samba-canção, folk music and contemporary Brazilian pop, with influences from jazz and funk. He cites Gilberto Gil, Caetano Veloso, and Jorge Ben Jor as his primary influences, particularly appreciating the latter for the apparent simplicity that conceals the depth of his lyrics. His songwriting frequently draws on themes of identity, travel, love, and the Brazilian diaspora experience in Europe.

== Personal life ==
Following the death of his father in 2015, Middea spent time in India on a silent retreat. He has lived between Lisbon and Barcelona for much of his adult life, and his experience as a Brazilian living in Europe deeply informs his music and lyrics. After several years of residency in Portugal, he obtained Portuguese citizenship.

== Discography ==
=== Studio albums ===
Title	Year	Notes
Dois	2014	Debut album; recorded in Brazil
A Dança do Mundo	2016	Recorded in Brazil
Vicentina	2020	Recorded in Lisbon
Beleza Isolar	2020	Recorded in Lisbon during the COVID-19 pandemic
Gente	2023	Produced by Breno Virícimo; recorded in Amsterdam
Notícias de Puglia	2025	Recorded on tour across multiple countries
