= JP Simões =

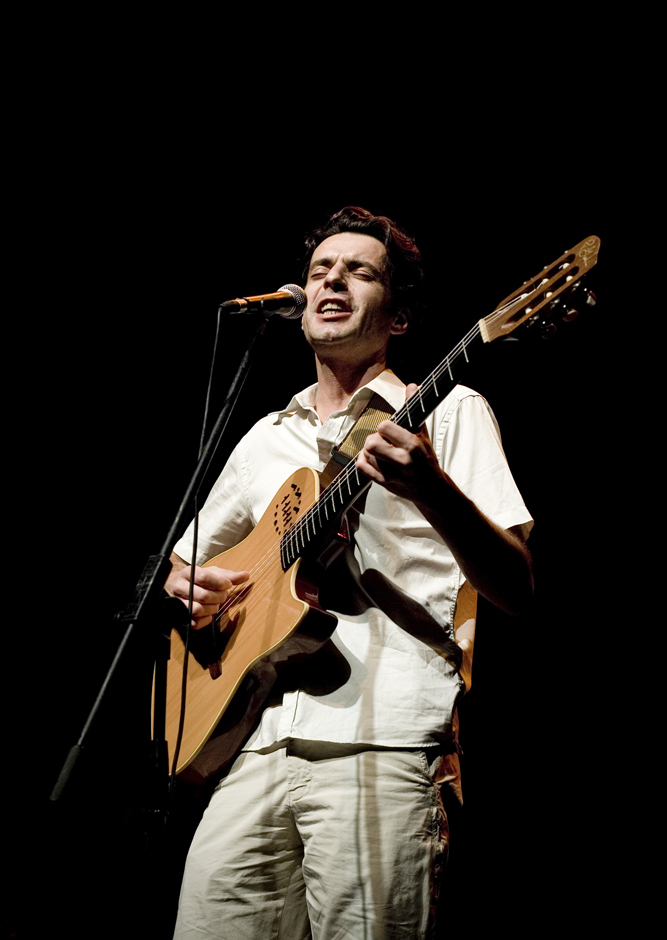
JP Simões

João Paulo Nunes Simões, better known as JP Simões, is a Portuguese singer and musician. He was born in Coimbra, Portugal, on 4 January 1970. Due to the Carnation Revolution of 1974 and subsequent turmoil, at age five he emigrated to Rio de Janeiro, Brazil, where he stayed about a year. Back to Portugal, Simões studied journalism, screenwriting, saxophone and Arabic language.

As to music, he has worked with Pop Dell'Arte, among others, and was the leading force behind the bands Belle Chase Hotel and Quinteto Tati. He wrote short stories, song lyrics, film scripts and participated as a musician and actor in films by Fernando Vendrell and Edgar Pêra, and signing some soundtracks for documentaries. In 2007, he premiered his solo album 1970. In 2009, he published his second album Boato.

In the past he has had tours solo as a one-man show, playing his solo repertoire among songs from his past bands, mostly Belle Chase Hotel, however currently he is known by the name Bloom and has tours solo, not only in Portugal but also throughout Europe.
