= Isaura (singer) =

Portuguese singer and songwriter (born 1989)

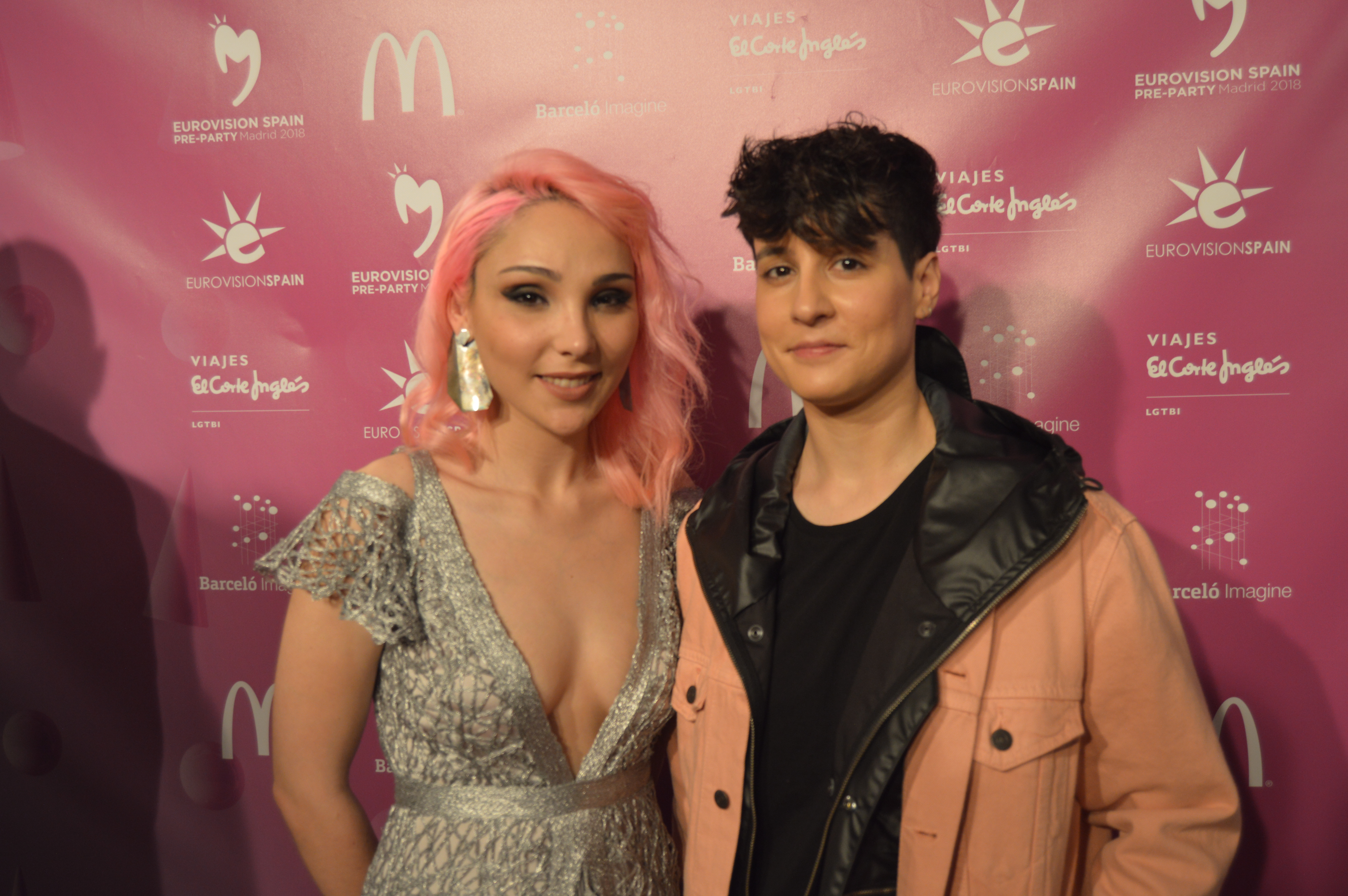
- Isaura (right) and Cláudia Pascoal at the Eurovision Spain PreParty 2018 in Madrid

Background information
- Born: Isaura Santos; 15 July 1989 (age 37); Gouveia, Portugal
- Genres: Alternative; pop; electronic; hip hop
- Occupations: Singer; songwriter
- Instrument: Vocals
- Years active: 2010–present
- Label: UMG
- Website: isaura.pt

Isaura Santos (born 15 July 1989), sometimes known mononymously as Isaura, is a Portuguese singer and songwriter. She composed the song "O jardim", performed by Cláudia Pascoal, that represented Portugal at the Eurovision Song Contest 2018 in Lisbon. Automatically qualified to the final, due to Portugal's first victory in the contest the year before, the song ended up in the last position.

== Career ==
She first came known in 2010 after she participated in the fourth season of the Portuguese edition of the music talent show Operação Triunfo where achieved 8th place overall.

== Personal life ==
Isaura identifies as lesbian.

In February 2020 Isaura announced she was fighting breast cancer and subsequently canceled all scheduled appearances.

== Discography ==
=== Studio albums ===
Title	Details	Peak chart positions
Title	Details	POR
Human	Released: 8 June 2018; Label: Universal Music Portugal; Format: CD, Digital download	5

=== Extended plays ===
Title	Details
Serendipity	Released: 18 May 2015; Label: Self-released; Format: Digital download
Agosto	Released: 13 November 2019; Label: Universal Music Portugal; Format: Digital Streaming

=== Singles ===
==== As lead artist ====
Title	Year	Album
"Useless"	2014	Serendipity
"Change It"	2015	Non-album singles
"8"	2016	Non-album singles
"I Need Ya"	2017	Human
"The Crossover (Intermission)"	2018	Human
"Busy Tone"	2018	Human
"Gone Now"	2018	Human
"Don't Shoot"	2018	Human
"Closer"	2018	Human
"Liga-Desliga"	2019	Agosto
"Uma Frase Não Faz A Canção" (feat. Luísa Sobral)	2019	Agosto
“Leve”	2022	TBC

==== As featured artist ====
Title	Year	Peak chart positions	Album
Title	Year	POR	Album
"Meu É Teu" (Diogo Piçarra featuring Isaura)	2015	—	Espelho
"O jardim" (Cláudia Pascoal featuring Isaura)	2018	21	Non-album single
"—" denotes a recording that did not chart or was not released in that territory.
