= Cláudia Pascoal =

Portuguese singer (born 1994)

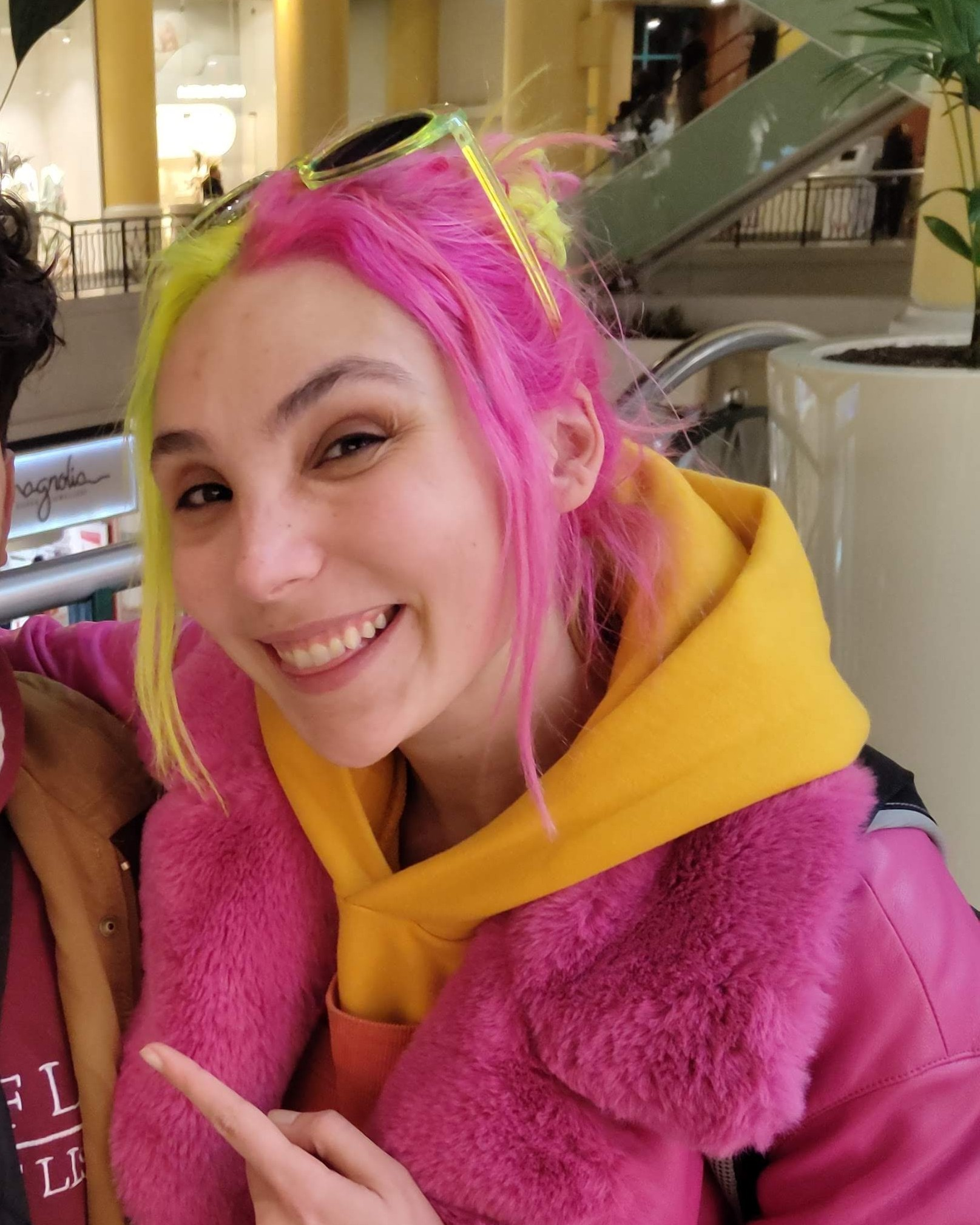
- Pascoal in March 2023

Background information
- Born: Cláudia Rafaela Teixeira Pascoal; 12 October 1994 (age 31); Gondomar, Portugal
- Genres: Soul, pop, indie pop
- Occupation: Singer
- Instruments: Vocals; ukulele; guitar
- Years active: 2015–present

Cláudia Rafaela Teixeira Pascoal (Portuguese pronunciation: [ˈklawðiɐ tɐjˈʃɐjɾɐ pɐʃˈkwal]; born 12 October 1994) is a Portuguese singer and songwriter from São Pedro da Cova, Gondomar. She represented Portugal at the Eurovision Song Contest 2018 with the song "O jardim" and she participated in several talent shows, including The Voice Portugal, where she finished sixth.

== Career ==
=== 2010–2015: Ídolos and Factor X ===
In 2010, Pascoal participated in talent show Ídolos, and in 2013 she participated in the first season of talent show Factor X. In 2014, Pascoal auditioned to present talk show Curto Circuito on SIC Radical, and ended up in third place. In 2015, she participated in Ídolos for a second time.

=== 2017–2018: The Voice Portugal and Eurovision Song Contest ===
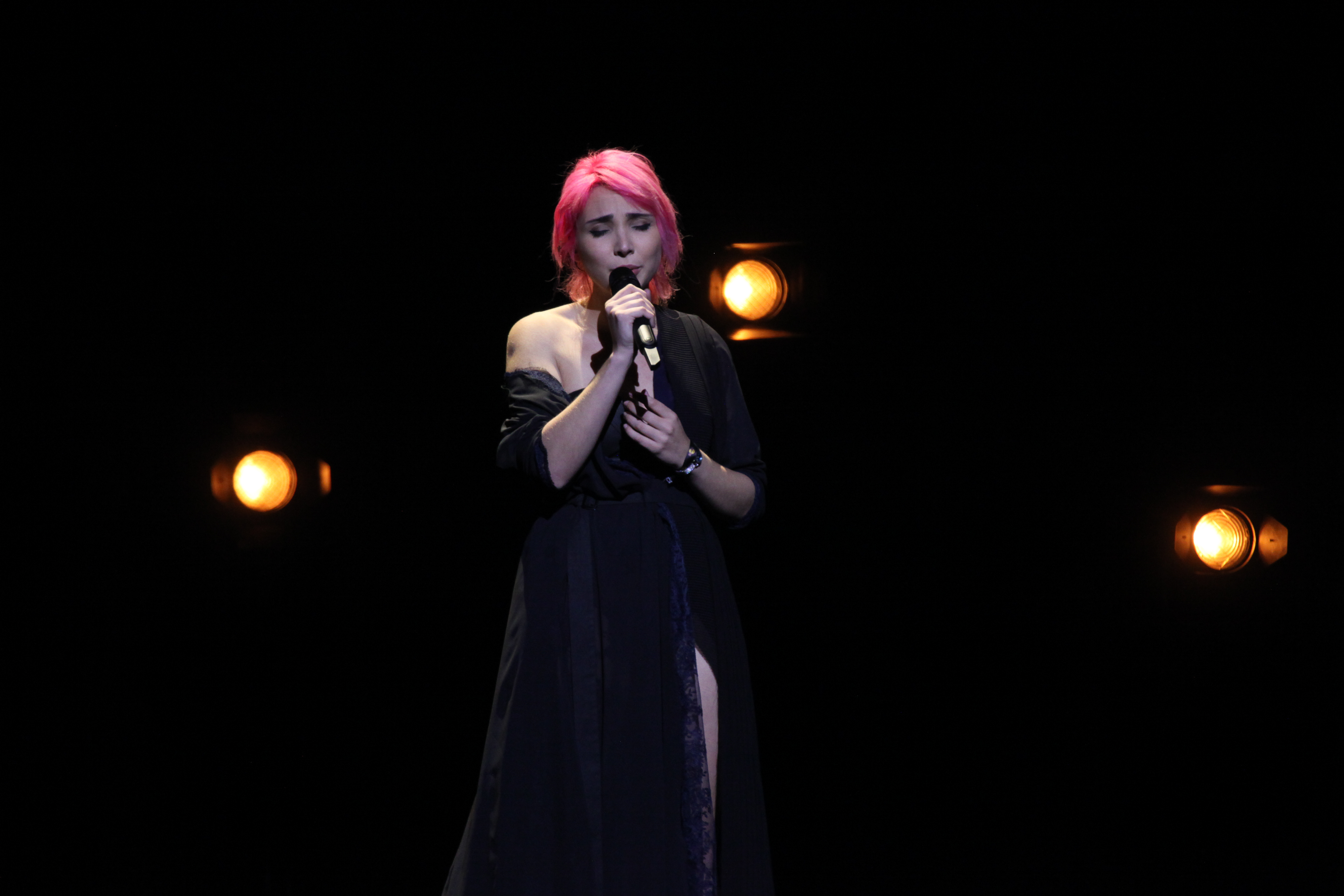
Cláudia Pascoal performing at Eurovision Song Contest in 2018

In 2017, she participated on the fifth season of talent show The Voice Portugal and was eventually eliminated in the semi-finals placing 6th overall. In 2018, Pascoal won the Festival da Canção, the national contest to select the Portuguese entry for the Eurovision Song Contest, with the song "O jardim", written by Isaura. As the host entry, she automatically qualified to the final. In the final the song received a total of 39 points and placed 26th.

=== 2019–2020: ! ===
In 2019, Pascoal released two singles, "Ter e Não Ter" in March, followed by a collaboration with Samuel Uria for "Viver" in November. In March 2020, she released her first studio album ! (Note: The title of the album ! is pronounced "blah".), as well as the third single from the album, "Espalha Brasas".

=== 2023–: !! and The Voice Portugal coach ===
On 19 May, 2023, Pascoal released her second studio album, !!. David Fonseca and Marante helped produce the album and Pascoal wrote and composed all of the songs on !!, apart from a cover of I Play Tennis by Miuda. Some of the songs made for !! will feature on a third album in the future.

In the latter half of 2026, Pascoal returned to The Voice Portugal, debuting as a coach, nine years after her appearance as a contestant.

== Discography ==
=== Studio albums ===
Title	Details	Peak chart positions
Title	Details	POR
!	Released: 27 March 2020; Label: Universal Music Portugal; Formats: Digital download, CD	6

=== Singles ===
Title	Year	Peak chart positions	Album
Title	Year	POR	Album
"O jardim" (featuring Isaura)	2018	21	Non-album single
"Ter e Não Ter"	2019	—	!
"Viver" (featuring Samuel Úria)	2019	—	!
"Espalha Brasas"	2020	—	!
"Passo A Passo" (with Tomás Adrião)	2020	—	Non-album single
"Quase Dança"	2020	—	!
"Honesty Bar" (with D'alva)	2021	—	Non-album single
"Tanto Faz"	2021	—	Non-album single
"Fado Chiclete"	2021	—	Non-album single
"—" denotes a single that did not chart or was not released.

== Notes ==
Preceded by Salvador Sobral with "Amar pelos dois"	Portugal in the Eurovision Song Contest; 2018	Succeeded by Conan Osíris with "Telemóveis"
