= Telemóveis =

2019 song by Conan Osíris

Single by Conan Osíris

from the album Xenonexo
- Language: Portuguese
- English title: "Mobile phones"
- Released: 11 February 2019
- Genre: Electrofado
- Length: 3:05
- Label: Ao Sul do Mundo
- Songwriter: Conan Osíris
- Producer: Conan Osíris

Conan Osíris singles chronology
"Telemóveis" (2019)	"Vinte Vinte (Pranto)" (2021)

Eurovision Song Contest 2019 entry
- Country: Portugal
- Artist: Conan Osíris
- Language: Portuguese
- Composer: Conan Osíris
- Lyricist: Conan Osíris

Finals performance
- Semi-final result: 15th
- Semi-final points: 51

Entry chronology
- ◄ "O jardim" (2018)
- "Medo de sentir" (2020) ►

Official performance video
- "Telemóveis" (First Semi-Final) on YouTube

"Telemóveis" ([tɛlɛˈmɔvɐjʃ]; English: Mobile phones) is a song by Portuguese singer-songwriter Conan Osíris, which represented Portugal at the Eurovision Song Contest 2019 in Tel Aviv, Israel.

== Background and release ==
Conan Osíris described the song as "people are caring about their mobile phones that they are starting to neglect their family, and they might even kill themselves if their phone breaks... Addiction to phones is dangerous."

"Telemóveis" was one of sixteen songs commissioned by RTP for Festival da Canção 2019, Portugal's national selection for the Eurovision Song Contest 2019. The composers both created the song and selected the performer for their entry. Conan Osíris decided to be both the composer and performer of "Telemóveis".

The lyric video for "Telemóveis" premiered via YouTube on 21 January 2019. The song became available through digital retailers and streaming services on 11 February 2019 via Ao Sul do Mundo.

== Composition ==
"Telemóveis" was written and produced by Conan Osíris, has a length of three minutes and five seconds (3:05) and moves at a tempo of 123 beats per minute.

About the musical style of "Telemóveis", Spanish newspaper 20 minutos stated: "[It is] a mixture of electronic rhythms with more oriental sounds". Francisco Chacón of Spanish newspaper ABC found "Arabic influences" in the song. Mari Carmen Sevilla of Spanish newspaper El Confidencial noted a "mixture of Arabic chords with techno and African rhythms".

== Eurovision Song Contest ==
=== Festival da Canção 2019 ===
Conan Osíris was announced as a participating composer in Festival da Canção 2019, Portugal's national selection for the Eurovision Song Contest 2019, on 5 December 2018. Osíris competed in the first semi-final on February 16, placing second with 19 points after winning the televote and coming fourth in the jury vote. In the final, held on 2 March 2019, Osíris won both the televote and jury vote, placing first with 24 points and thus representing Portugal at the Eurovision Song Contest 2019.

=== Eurovision Song Contest 2019 ===
The Eurovision Song Contest 2019 took place at the Expo Tel Aviv in Tel Aviv, Israel and consisted of two semi-finals on 14 and 16 May, and the final on 18 May 2019. Portugal was drawn to perform in the second half of the first semi-final. The running order for the semi-finals was decided by the producers, in order to avoid similar songs being placed next to each other. Portugal performed in position 15, following the entry from Estonia and before the entry from Greece. Portugal did not qualify for the grand final.

== Charts ==
Chart (2019)	Peak position
Portugal (AFP)	10

== Release history ==
Region	Date	Format	Label
Various	11 February 2019	Digital download, streaming	Ao Sul do Mundo
