= O jardim =

2018 song by Cláudia Pascoal

Single by Cláudia Pascoal
- Released: 9 March 2018
- Length: 2:38
- Label: Universal Music Portugal
- Songwriter: Isaura

Cláudia Pascoal singles chronology
"O jardim" (2018)	"Ter e Não Ter" (2019)

Music video
- "O jardim" on YouTube

Eurovision Song Contest 2018 entry
- Country: Portugal
- Artist: Cláudia Pascoal
- Language: Portuguese
- Composer: Isaura
- Lyricist: Isaura

Finals performance
- Final result: 26th
- Final points: 39

Entry chronology
- ◄ "Amar pelos dois" (2017)
- "Telemóveis" (2019) ►

Official performance video
- "O jardim" (First Semi-Final) on YouTube "O jardim" (Grand Final) on YouTube

"O jardim" (Portuguese pronunciation: [u ʒɐɾˈdĩ]; transl. The Garden) is a song performed by Portuguese singers Cláudia Pascoal and Isaura, which represented Portugal at the Eurovision Song Contest 2018. It premiered on 25 February 2018, when it was performed live in the second semi-final of Festival da Canção 2018, Portugal's national selection for the Eurovision Song Contest 2018. The song was released as a digital download on 9 March 2018 by Universal Music Portugal. The song features uncredited vocals from the song's lyricist, Isaura.

== Background ==
"O jardim" was one of twenty-six songs commissioned by RTP for Festival da Canção 2018, Portugal's national selection for the Eurovision Song Contest 2018. The composers both created the song and selected the performer for their entry. Isaura composed "O jardim" and chose Cláudia Pascoal as the performer.

== Composition ==
"O jardim" was written and produced by Isaura. "O jardim" is a ballad with a length of two minutes and thirty-eight seconds (2:38) that moves at a tempo of 60 beats per minute. Lyrically, the song is about loss and saudade: "São as flores o meu lugar / Agora que não estás / Rego eu o teu jardim". (Note: In English translation: "All the flowers, they're my place / Now that you're gone / I'll take care of your garden".) Isaura stated that "O jardim" is a song about "adding tension, [...] saudade, something we have on the chest, any sorrow, and basically for me this song is about preserving that tension".

== Eurovision Song Contest ==
Isaura was announced as a participating songwriter in Festival da Canção 2018, Portugal's national selection for the Eurovision Song Contest 2018, on 27 September 2017. On 18 January 2018, Cláudia Pascoal was announced to be performing her song, titled "O jardim". Pascoal competed in the second semi-final, placing second with 20 points after coming second in both the jury vote and the televote. In the final, held on March 4, she came second in the jury vote and won the televote, placing first with 22 points and thus representing Portugal at the Eurovision Song Contest 2018.

As Portugal was the host country, the song automatically advanced to the final, which was held on 12 May 2018 in Lisbon.

On 12 March 2018, it was announced that she would perform 8th in the Grand Final on 12 May 2018. The song placed 26th, and last, in the Final, receiving 39 points.

== Reception ==
=== Critical response ===
Charlotte Runcie of British newspaper The Daily Telegraph listed "O jardim" as one of the five best Eurovision entries of the year, and described it as an "electropop-tinged indie ballad, gorgeously intimate and contemporary too. Just lovely". Fabien Randanne of French newspaper 20 Minutes stated that the song "shines for its simplicity, modesty and the emotion that transcends language barriers". Hans Rollman of American online magazine PopMatters called the song a "moving tribute to Isaura's grandmother, and the garden that meant a great deal to them both".

== Music video ==
The music video for "O jardim" premiered on 30 April 2018.

== Track listings ==
- Digital download
1. "O jardim" – 2:38
- Promo CD
1. "O jardim"
2. "O jardim" (Instrumental)

== Credits and personnel ==
- Cláudia Pascoal – lead vocals
- Isaura – background vocals, production, songwriting

== Charts ==
Chart performance for "O jardim"
Chart (2018)	Peak position
Portugal (AFP)	21
Portugal Digital Songs (Billboard)	3

== Release history ==
Release history for "O jardim"
Region	Date	Format	Label
Various	9 March 2018	Digital download	Universal Music Portugal
