= Portugal in the Eurovision Song Contest 2017 =

- Eurovision Song Contest 2017
- Participating broadcaster: Rádio e Televisão de Portugal (RTP)
- Country: Portugal
- Selection process: Festival da Canção 2017
- Selection date: 5 March 2017

Competing entry
- Song: "Amar pelos dois"
- Artist: Salvador Sobral
- Songwriters: Luísa Sobral

Placement
- Semi-final result: Qualified (1st, 370 points)
- Final result: 1st, 758 points

Participation chronology

Portugal was represented at the Eurovision Song Contest 2017 with the song "Amar pelos dois", written by Luísa Sobral and performed by Salvador Sobral. The Portuguese participating broadcaster, Rádio e Televisão de Portugal (RTP), organised the national final Festival da Canção 2017 in order to select its entry for the contest. In August 2016, RTP announced that it would be returning to the contest after a one-year absence following its withdrawal in 2016 due to poor results in previous contests and the broadcaster's insufficient promotion of music-related content. After two semi-finals and a final which took place in February and March 2017, "Amar pelos dois" performed by Salvador Sobral emerged as the winner after achieving the highest score following the combination of votes from seven regional juries and a public televote.

Portugal was drawn to compete in the first semi-final of the Eurovision Song Contest which took place on 9 May 2017. Performing during the show in position 9, "Amar pelos dois" was announced among the top 10 entries of the first semi-final and therefore qualified to compete in the final on 13 May. It was later revealed that Portugal placed first out of the 18 participating countries in the semi-final with 370 points. In the final, Portugal performed in position 11 and placed first out of the 26 participating countries, winning the contest with a record total of 758 points. This was Portugal's first win in the Eurovision Song Contest since it began participating in 1964.

== Background ==
Prior to the 2017 contest, Radiotelevisão Portuguesa (RTP) until 2003, and Rádio e Televisão de Portugal (RTP) since 2004, have participated in the Eurovision Song Contest representing Portugal forty-eight times since their first entry in 1964. Their highest placing in the contest was sixth, achieved in 1996 with the song "O meu coração não tem cor" performed by Lúcia Moniz. Following the introduction of semi-finals for the 2004 contest, Portugal had featured in only three finals. Their least successful result has been last place, achieved on three occasions, most recently in 1997 with the song "Antes do adeus" performed by Célia Lawson. Portugal has also received nul points on two occasions; in 1964 and 1997. In 2015 the song "Há um mar que nos separa" performed by Leonor Andrade failed to qualify to the final.

As part of its duties as participating broadcaster, RTP organises the selection of its entry in the Eurovision Song Contest and broadcasts the event in the country. The broadcaster has traditionally selected its entry for the contest via the music competition Festival da Canção, with exceptions in 1988 and 2005 when the entries were internally selected. RTP announced in October 2015 that it would not participate in the 2016 contest due to poor results in previous contests and its insufficient promotion of music-related content, and that it was looking forward to participating in 2017 with a restructured selection process. Following their one-year absence, RTP confirmed its participation in the 2017 contest on 4 August 2016. On 5 December 2016, the broadcaster revealed details regarding their selection procedure and announced the organization of Festival da Canção 2017 in order to select the 2017 entry.

== Before Eurovision ==
=== Festival da Canção 2017 ===
The official logo of Festival da Canção 2017.

Festival da Canção 2017 was the 51st edition of Festival da Canção, the national final organised by RTP to select its entry for the Eurovision Song Contest 2017. Sixteen entries competed in the competition that consisted of two semi-finals held on 19 and 26 February 2017 leading to an eight-song final on 5 March 2017. All three shows of the competition were broadcast on RTP1 as well as online via the broadcaster's official website rtp.pt.

==== Format ====
The format of the competition consisted of three shows: two semi-finals on 19 and 26 February 2017 and the final on 5 March 2017. Each semi-final featured eight competing entries from which four advanced from each show to complete the eight song lineup in the final. Results during the semi-finals were determined by the 50/50 combination of votes from a jury panel appointed by RTP and public televoting, while results during the final were determined by the 50/50 combination of votes from seven regional juries and public televoting, which was opened following the second semi-final and closed during the final show. Both the public televote and the juries assigned points from 3-8, 10 and 12 based on the ranking developed by both streams of voting.

==== Competing entries ====
Sixteen composers were nominated by journalist and music critic Nuno Galopim and Antena 3 presenter Henrique Amaro and invited by RTP for the competition. The composers, which both created the songs and selected its performers, were required to submit the demo and final versions of their entries by 11 and 31 January 2017, respectively. For the first time in the history of the competition, songs could be submitted in any language other than Portuguese. The selected composers were revealed on 5 December 2016 and were:

- Luísa Sobral
- Márcia
- Rita Redshoes
- David Santos (Noiserv)
- Celina da Piedade
- Samuel Úria
- Nuno Gonçalves (The Gift)
- Pedro Silva Martins (Deolinda)
- Tóli César Machado (GNR)
- João Pedro Coimbra (Mesa)
- Nuno Figueiredo (Virgem Suta)
- Pedro Saraiva (Sir Aiva/D.R. Sax)
- Nuno Feist
- Jorge Fernando
- João Só
- Héber Marques

Half of the competing artists were revealed on 18 January 2017 with the remaining artists being revealed on 26 January 2017. Among the competing artists was former Eurovision Song Contest entrant Rui Drumond, who represented Portugal in 2005 as part of the duo 2B.

| Artist | Song | Songwriter(s) |
|---|---|---|
| Beea | "Ao teu olhar" | Jorge Fernando |
| Celina da Piedade | "Primavera" | Celina da Piedade, Alex Gaspar |
| David Gomes | "My Paradise" | Tóli César Machado, Joana Duarte |
| Deolinda Kinzimba | "O que eu vi nos meus sonhos" | Rita Redshoes, Senhor Vulcão |
| Fernando Daniel | "Poema a dois" | Nuno Feist, Nuno Marques da Silva |
| Golden Slumbers | "Para perto" | Samuel Úria |
| Helena Kendall | "Andamos no céu" | João Só |
| Inês Sousa | "Se o tempo não falasse" | Noiserv |
| Jorge Benvinda | "Gente bestial" | Nuno Figueiredo |
| Lena d'Água | "Nunca me fui embora" | Pedro Silva Martins |
| Lisa Garden | "Without You" | Pedro Saraiva, Lisa Garden |
| Márcia | "Agora" | Márcia |
| Pedro Gonçalves | "Don't Walk Away" | João Pedro Coimbra |
| Rui Drumond | "O teu melhor" | Héber Marques |
| Salvador Sobral | "Amar pelos dois" | Luísa Sobral |
| Viva La Diva | "Nova glória" | Nuno Gonçalves |

==== Semi-finals ====
The two semi-finals took place at RTP's studios in Lisbon on 19 and 26 February 2017. The first semi-final was hosted by Sónia Araújo and José Carlos Malato while the second semi-final was hosted by Tânia Ribas de Oliveira and Jorge Gabriel. In each semi-final eight entries competed and four advanced to the final based on the 50/50 combination of votes of a jury panel consisting of Júlio Isidro, Ramon Galarza, Nuno Markl, Tozé Brito, Inês Lopes Gonçalves, Gabriela Schaaf, João Carlos Callixto, Inês Meneses, and Dora, and a public televote. In addition to the performances of the competing entries, Real Combo Lisboense performed as the interval act in both semi-finals with a medley of songs that did not win Festival da Canção.

Semi-final 1 – 19 February 2017
| R/O | Artist | Song | Jury | Televote | Total | Place |
|---|---|---|---|---|---|---|
| 1 | Márcia | "Agora" | 5 | 3 | 8 | 8 |
| 2 | Golden Slumbers | "Para perto" | 6 | 5 | 11 | 5 |
| 3 | Fernando Daniel | "Poema a dois" | 7 | 10 | 17 | 3 |
| 4 | Deolinda Kinzimba | "O que eu vi nos meus sonhos" | 8 | 4 | 12 | 4 |
| 5 | Rui Drumond | "O teu melhor" | 3 | 6 | 9 | 7 |
| 6 | Lisa Garden | "Without You" | 4 | 7 | 11 | 6 |
| 7 | Salvador Sobral | "Amar pelos dois" | 12 | 8 | 20 | 2 |
| 8 | Viva La Diva | "Nova glória" | 10 | 12 | 22 | 1 |

Semi-final 2 – 26 February 2017
| R/O | Artist | Song | Jury | Televote | Total | Place |
|---|---|---|---|---|---|---|
| 1 | David Gomes | "My Paradise" | 6 | 6 | 12 | 7 |
| 2 | Lena d'Água | "Nunca me fui embora" | 10 | 4 | 14 | 4 |
| 3 | Beea | "Ao teu olhar" | 8 | 5 | 13 | 5 |
| 4 | Pedro Gonçalves | "Don't Walk Away" | 4 | 12 | 16 | 3 |
| 5 | Helena Kendall | "Andamos no céu" | 5 | 8 | 13 | 6 |
| 6 | Celina da Piedade | "Primavera" | 12 | 7 | 19 | 1 |
| 7 | Jorge Benvinda | "Gente bestial" | 7 | 10 | 17 | 2 |
| 8 | Inês Sousa | "Se o tempo não falasse" | 3 | 3 | 6 | 8 |

==== Final ====
The final took place at the Coliseu dos Recreios in Lisbon on 5 March 2017, hosted by Sílvia Alberto and Catarina Furtado. The eight entries that qualified from the two preceding semi-finals competed and the winner, "Amar pelos dois" performed by Salvador Sobral, was selected based on the 50/50 combination of votes of seven regional juries and a public televote. In addition to the performances of the competing entries, Marta Hugon, Miguel Ângelo, NBC, Rita Guerra (who represented Portugal in 2003), Susana Félix, and Tabanka performed a medley of songs that did not win Festival da Canção as the interval act.

Final – 5 March 2017
| R/O | Artist | Song | Jury | Televote | Total | Place |
|---|---|---|---|---|---|---|
| 1 | Jorge Benvinda | "Gente bestial" | 10 | 5 | 15 | 4 |
| 2 | Pedro Gonçalves | "Don't Walk Away" | 5 | 8 | 13 | 6 |
| 3 | Lena d'Água | "Nunca me fui embora" | 5 | 3 | 8 | 7 |
| 4 | Salvador Sobral | "Amar pelos dois" | 12 | 10 | 22 | 1 |
| 5 | Fernando Daniel | "Poema a dois" | 7 | 7 | 14 | 5 |
| 6 | Celina da Piedade | "Primavera" | 10 | 6 | 16 | 3 |
| 7 | Deolinda Kinzimba | "O que eu vi nos meus sonhos" | 3 | 4 | 7 | 8 |
| 8 | Viva La Diva | "Nova glória" | 6 | 12 | 18 | 2 |

Detailed regional jury votes
| R/O | Song | North | Central | Lisbon Area | Alentejo | Algarve | Azores | Madeira | Total | Points |
|---|---|---|---|---|---|---|---|---|---|---|
| 1 | "Gente bestial" | 8 | 8 | 5 | 7 | 8 | 10 | 7 | 53 | 10 |
| 2 | "Don't Walk Away" | 3 | 7 | 6 | 3 | 12 | 4 | 3 | 38 | 5 |
| 3 | "Nunca me fui embora" | 7 | 5 | 7 | 6 | 3 | 5 | 5 | 38 | 5 |
| 4 | "Amar pelos dois" | 12 | 12 | 10 | 12 | 10 | 12 | 12 | 80 | 12 |
| 5 | "Poema a dois" | 6 | 6 | 4 | 8 | 7 | 7 | 6 | 44 | 7 |
| 6 | "Primavera" | 10 | 3 | 8 | 10 | 6 | 8 | 8 | 53 | 10 |
| 7 | "O que eu vi nos meus sonhos" | 4 | 10 | 3 | 5 | 4 | 6 | 4 | 36 | 3 |
| 8 | "Nova glória" | 5 | 4 | 12 | 4 | 5 | 3 | 10 | 43 | 6 |
Members of the jury
North: Álvaro Costa, André Tentúgal, Hélder Gonçalves; Central: Inês Santos, Adolfo Mesquita Nunes, Nucha; Lisbon Area: Victor de Sousa, Anabela, Carlos Mendes; Alentejo: Janita Salomé, Ana Sofia Varela, Jorge Roque; Algarve: Filipa Sousa, Nuno Guerreiro, Viviane; Madeira: Vânia Fernandes, Nuno Morna, Ricardo Vasconcelos; Azores: Joel Neto, Carlos Alberto Moniz, Luís Filipe Borges

=== Incidents ===
On social media, the manager of the official Facebook page of Festival da Canção commented that "For many of the [participating] composers, Eurovision was not the goal but rather to have this opportunity to showcase more of Portuguese music". The comment was met with controversy among Portuguese Eurovision fans. RTP's programming director, Daniel Deusdado reacted to the criticism by saying "Social networks catch fire for anything. If we had said otherwise, that is, that we make a song to win Eurovision, people later would said: and why should we win Eurovision? This [Festival da Canção] should be for providing a platform for Portuguese music [...] For us, everything is fine. The aim is to push for Portuguese music [...] I can say that half of the forest didn't burn"

Following the first semi-final, jury panellist Nuno Markl publicly revealed on social media that he had given top marks to Salvador Sobral, which sparked calls for his replacement. It was also pointed out that Markl works with one of the composers competing in the second semi-final, João Só, at Rádio Comercial, which could cause conflict of interest. On 22 February 2017, Markl submitted his resignation from the jury panel, but it was not accepted by RTP.

== At Eurovision ==
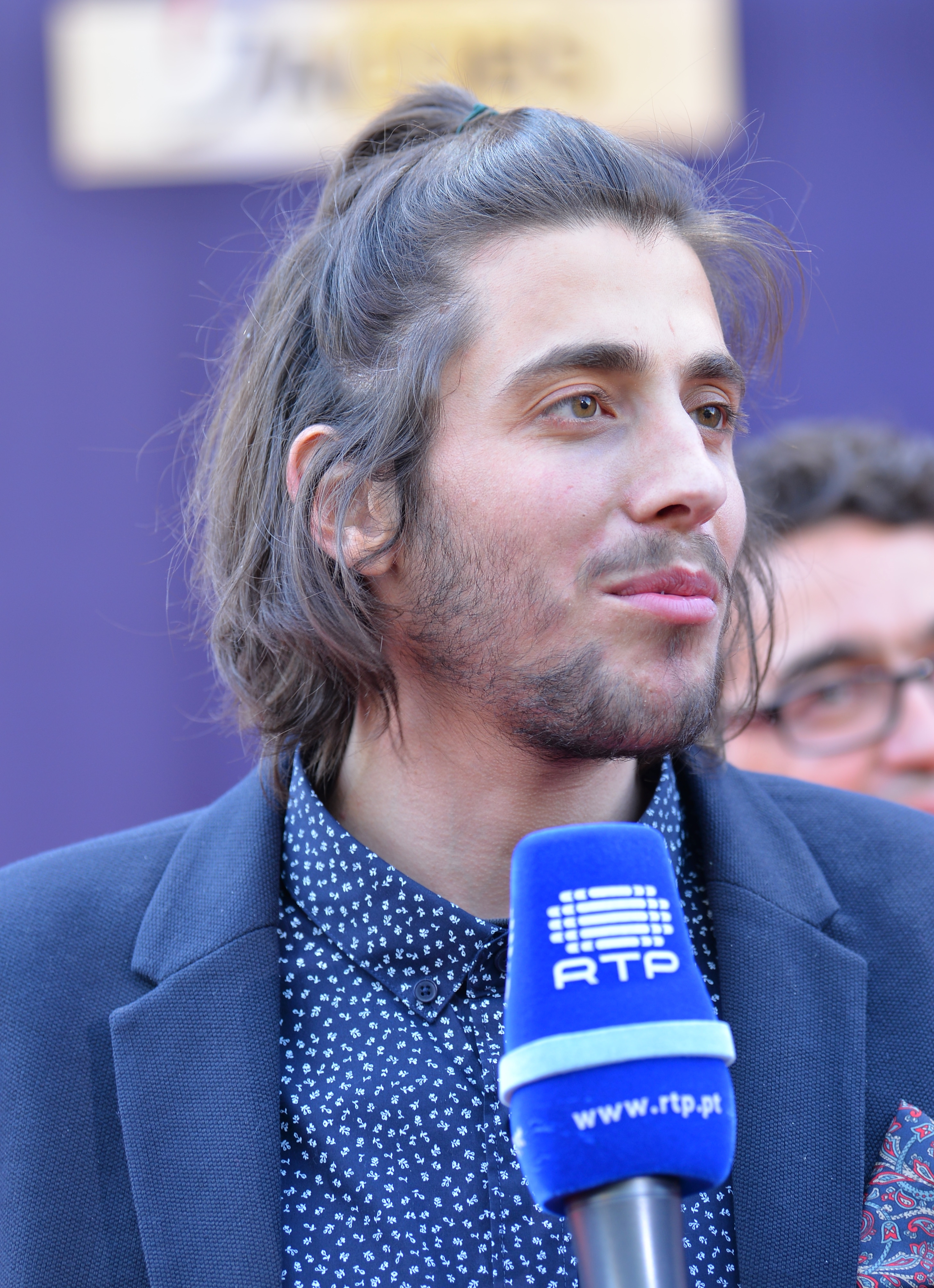
Salvador Sobral at the opening ceremony in Kyiv

According to Eurovision rules, all nations with the exceptions of the host country and the "Big Five" (France, Germany, Italy, Spain, and the United Kingdom) are required to qualify from one of two semi-finals in order to compete for the final; the top ten countries from each semi-final progress to the final. The European Broadcasting Union (EBU) split up the competing countries into six different pots based on voting patterns from previous contests, with countries with favourable voting histories put into the same pot. On 31 January 2017, a special allocation draw was held which placed each country into one of the two semi-finals, as well as which half of the show they would perform in. Portugal was placed into the first semi-final, to be held on 9 May 2017, and was scheduled to perform in the first half of the show.

Once all the competing songs for the 2017 contest had been released, the running order for the semi-finals was decided by the shows' producers rather than through another draw, so that similar songs were not placed next to each other. Portugal was set to perform in position 9, following the entry from Azerbaijan and before the entry from Greece.

In Portugal, the three shows were broadcast on RTP1 and RTP Internacional with commentary by José Carlos Malato and Nuno Galopim. RTP appointed Filomena Cautela as its spokesperson to announce the top 12-point score awarded by the Portuguese jury during the final.

=== Semi-final ===
Due to health issues, Salvador Sobral was unable to take part in technical rehearsals on 30 April and 4 May and was therefore replaced by his sister and composer of "Amar pelos dois" Luísa Sobral upon approval of the EBU. Salvador Sobral took part in dress rehearsals on 8 and 9 May, including the jury show on 8 May where the professional juries of each country watched and voted on the competing entries. The Portuguese performance featured Salvador Sobral dressed in a black suit performing on the satellite stage in the middle of the audience with a microphone stand. The LED screens displayed a forest backdrop.

At the end of the show, Portugal was announced as having finished in the top 10 and subsequently qualifying for the grand final. It was later revealed that Portugal placed first in the semi-final, receiving a total of 370 points: 197 points from the televoting and 173 points from the juries.

=== Final ===
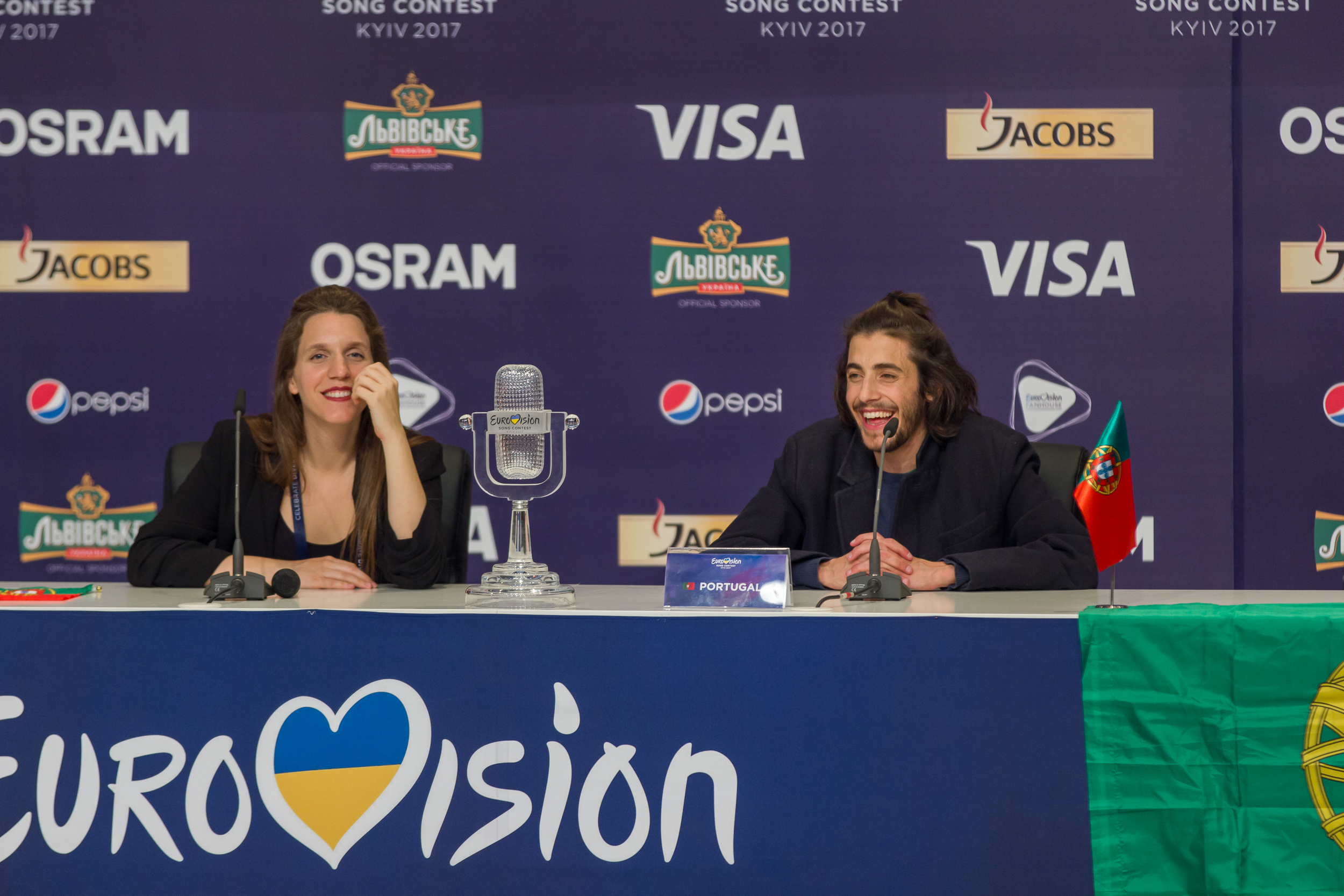
Luísa and Salvador Sobral during the winner's press conference

Shortly after the first semi-final, a winners' press conference was held for the ten qualifying countries. As part of this press conference, the qualifying artists took part in a draw to determine which half of the grand final they would subsequently participate in. This draw was done in the reverse order the countries appeared in the semi-final running order. Portugal was drawn to compete in the first half. Following this draw, the shows' producers decided upon the running order of the final, as they had done for the semi-finals. Portugal was subsequently placed to perform in position 11, following the entry from Denmark and before the entry from Azerbaijan.

Salvador Sobral once again took part in dress rehearsals on 12 and 13 May before the final, including the jury final where the professional juries cast their final votes before the live show. Salvador Sobral performed a repeat of his semi-final performance during the final on 12 May. Portugal won the contest placing first with a score of 758 points: 382 points from the juries and 376 points from the televoting. This was Portugal's first victory in the Eurovision Song Contest. Salvador performed the song together with Luísa during the winner's encore.

=== Voting ===
Points awarded to Portugal by each national televote

Points awarded to Portugal by each national jury

Voting during the three shows involved each country awarding two sets of points from 1-8, 10 and 12: one from their professional jury and the other from televoting. Each nation's jury consisted of five music industry professionals who are citizens of the country they represent, with their names published before the contest to ensure transparency. This jury judged each entry based on: vocal capacity; the stage performance; the song's composition and originality; and the overall impression by the act. In addition, no member of a national jury was permitted to be related in any way to any of the competing acts in such a way that they cannot vote impartially and independently. The individual rankings of each jury member as well as the nation's televoting results were released shortly after the grand final.

Below is a breakdown of points awarded to Portugal and awarded by Portugal in the first semi-final and grand final of the contest, and the breakdown of the jury voting and televoting conducted during the two shows:

==== Points awarded to Portugal ====
Points awarded to Portugal (Semi-final 1)
| Score | Televote | Jury |
|---|---|---|
| 12 points | Albania; Belgium; Finland; Iceland; Latvia; Poland; Slovenia; Spain; Sweden | Azerbaijan; Georgia; Iceland; Latvia; Moldova; Poland; Spain |
| 10 points | Australia; Greece; Italy; United Kingdom | Cyprus; Finland; United Kingdom |
| 8 points | Azerbaijan; Georgia | Slovenia |
| 7 points | Armenia; Czech Republic; Montenegro | Armenia; Belgium; Czech Republic |
| 6 points | Cyprus; Moldova | Albania; Australia |
| 5 points | | Greece; Sweden |
| 4 points | | Italy; Montenegro |
| 3 points | | |
| 2 points | | |
| 1 point | | |

Points awarded to Portugal (Final)
| Score | Televote | Jury |
|---|---|---|
| 12 points | Austria; Belgium; Finland; France; Germany; Iceland; Israel; Lithuania; Netherlands; Norway; Spain; Switzerland | Armenia; Czech Republic; France; Georgia; Hungary; Iceland; Israel; Latvia; Lithuania; Netherlands; Poland; San Marino; Serbia; Slovenia; Spain; Sweden; Switzerland; United Kingdom |
| 10 points | Armenia; Croatia; Estonia; Ireland; Latvia; Poland; Sweden; Ukraine | Belarus; Denmark; Germany; Macedonia; Malta; Norway; Ukraine |
| 8 points | Albania; Azerbaijan; Czech Republic; Georgia; Greece; Malta; Montenegro; Serbia; Slovenia; United Kingdom | Austria; Azerbaijan; Belgium; Cyprus; Estonia; Finland |
| 7 points | Australia; Belarus; Bulgaria; Cyprus; Hungary; Macedonia; Romania; San Marino | Australia; Croatia; Moldova |
| 6 points | Moldova | Albania; Romania |
| 5 points | Denmark; Italy | Greece; Ireland; Italy |
| 4 points | | |
| 3 points | | |
| 2 points | | |
| 1 points | | |

==== Points awarded by Portugal ====
Points awarded by Portugal (Semi-final 1)
| Score | Televote | Jury |
|---|---|---|
| 12 points | Moldova | Czech Republic |
| 10 points | Sweden | Moldova |
| 8 points | Belgium | Azerbaijan |
| 7 points | Finland | Finland |
| 6 points | Georgia | Australia |
| 5 points | Greece | Sweden |
| 4 points | Slovenia | Armenia |
| 3 points | Cyprus | Georgia |
| 2 points | Czech Republic | Greece |
| 1 point | Azerbaijan | Poland |

Points awarded by Portugal (Final)
| Score | Televote | Jury |
|---|---|---|
| 12 points | Moldova | Azerbaijan |
| 10 points | Belgium | Austria |
| 8 points | Bulgaria | Belgium |
| 7 points | Romania | Sweden |
| 6 points | France | Moldova |
| 5 points | Spain | Australia |
| 4 points | Italy | France |
| 3 points | Ukraine | Netherlands |
| 2 points | Hungary | Norway |
| 1 point | Sweden | Cyprus |

==== Detailed voting results ====
The following members comprised the Portuguese jury:

- Tozé Brito (jury chairperson) – composer, songwriter, former singer, director at Portuguese Author's Society; represented Portugal in 1978 as a member of Gemini; composer of the 1982 and 1985 Portuguese entries
- Nelson Carvalho – music producer, sound engineer
- Inês Meneses – radio personality
- Celina da Piedade – musician
- Ramón Galarza – musician, music producer

Detailed voting results from Portugal (Semi-final 1)
| R/O | Country | Jury | | | | | | | Televote | |
| R/O | Country | T. Brito | N. Carvalho | I. Meneses | C. da Piedade | R. Galarza | Rank | Points | Rank | Points |
|---|---|---|---|---|---|---|---|---|---|---|
| 01 | Sweden | 5 | 3 | 6 | 5 | 7 | 6 | 5 | 2 | 10 |
| 02 | Georgia | 12 | 4 | 14 | 11 | 4 | 8 | 3 | 5 | 6 |
| 03 | Australia | 2 | 7 | 5 | 3 | 8 | 5 | 6 | 12 | |
| 04 | Albania | 17 | 15 | 15 | 17 | 15 | 17 | | 17 | |
| 05 | Belgium | 15 | 11 | 4 | 15 | 16 | 13 | | 3 | 8 |
| 06 | Montenegro | 11 | 17 | 17 | 9 | 17 | 15 | | 16 | |
| 07 | Finland | 3 | 2 | 7 | 6 | 6 | 4 | 7 | 4 | 7 |
| 08 | Azerbaijan | 1 | 1 | 3 | 13 | 5 | 3 | 8 | 10 | 1 |
| 09 | Portugal | | | | | | | | | |
| 10 | Greece | 7 | 10 | 8 | 12 | 9 | 9 | 2 | 6 | 5 |
| 11 | Poland | 9 | 9 | 13 | 10 | 10 | 10 | 1 | 13 | |
| 12 | Moldova | 6 | 8 | 2 | 2 | 2 | 2 | 10 | 1 | 12 |
| 13 | Iceland | 8 | 12 | 10 | 8 | 14 | 11 | | 11 | |
| 14 | Czech Republic | 4 | 5 | 1 | 1 | 1 | 1 | 12 | 9 | 2 |
| 15 | Cyprus | 10 | 16 | 11 | 4 | 13 | 12 | | 8 | 3 |
| 16 | Armenia | 14 | 6 | 12 | 7 | 3 | 7 | 4 | 14 | |
| 17 | Slovenia | 16 | 14 | 16 | 14 | 12 | 16 | | 7 | 4 |
| 18 | Latvia | 13 | 13 | 9 | 16 | 11 | 14 | | 15 | |

Detailed voting results from Portugal (Final)
| R/O | Country | Jury | | | | | | | Televote | |
| R/O | Country | T. Brito | N. Carvalho | I. Meneses | C. da Piedade | R. Galarza | Rank | Points | Rank | Points |
|---|---|---|---|---|---|---|---|---|---|---|
| 01 | Israel | 17 | 22 | 25 | 22 | 15 | 25 | | 11 | |
| 02 | Poland | 15 | 17 | 20 | 18 | 9 | 19 | | 21 | |
| 03 | Belarus | 23 | 16 | 16 | 2 | 6 | 12 | | 16 | |
| 04 | Austria | 2 | 2 | 9 | 4 | 20 | 2 | 10 | 17 | |
| 05 | Armenia | 19 | 13 | 10 | 5 | 16 | 13 | | 19 | |
| 06 | Netherlands | 9 | 14 | 11 | 12 | 7 | 8 | 3 | 13 | |
| 07 | Moldova | 13 | 8 | 1 | 1 | 22 | 5 | 6 | 1 | 12 |
| 08 | Hungary | 22 | 15 | 19 | 6 | 3 | 15 | | 9 | 2 |
| 09 | Italy | 8 | 21 | 17 | 15 | 10 | 18 | | 7 | 4 |
| 10 | Denmark | 20 | 20 | 21 | 19 | 5 | 20 | | 25 | |
| 11 | Portugal | | | | | | | | | |
| 12 | Azerbaijan | 1 | 1 | 2 | 10 | 21 | 1 | 12 | 15 | |
| 13 | Croatia | 25 | 25 | 15 | 24 | 1 | 22 | | 12 | |
| 14 | Australia | 6 | 7 | 7 | 8 | 17 | 6 | 5 | 22 | |
| 15 | Greece | 12 | 9 | 14 | 23 | 12 | 17 | | 20 | |
| 16 | Spain | 11 | 18 | 8 | 14 | 19 | 16 | | 6 | 5 |
| 17 | Norway | 14 | 6 | 6 | 3 | 25 | 9 | 2 | 24 | |
| 18 | United Kingdom | 4 | 11 | 13 | 11 | 24 | 11 | | 14 | |
| 19 | Cyprus | 16 | 12 | 12 | 7 | 13 | 10 | 1 | 18 | |
| 20 | Romania | 24 | 24 | 24 | 25 | 2 | 24 | | 4 | 7 |
| 21 | Germany | 18 | 19 | 22 | 21 | 11 | 23 | | 23 | |
| 22 | Ukraine | 21 | 23 | 23 | 17 | 4 | 21 | | 8 | 3 |
| 23 | Belgium | 10 | 3 | 4 | 13 | 14 | 3 | 8 | 2 | 10 |
| 24 | Sweden | 7 | 5 | 5 | 9 | 18 | 4 | 7 | 10 | 1 |
| 25 | Bulgaria | 3 | 4 | 18 | 16 | 23 | 14 | | 3 | 8 |
| 26 | France | 5 | 10 | 3 | 20 | 8 | 7 | 4 | 5 | 6 |
