= Festival da Canção =

Portuguese Eurovision Song Contest preselection

- Logo since 2024
- Also known as: Festival RTP da Canção
- Genre: Song contest
- Presented by: List of presenters
- Country of origin: Portugal
- Original language: Portuguese
- No. of episodes: 60 editions (in 2026)

Production
- Production location: Multiple cities in Portugal (Host cities)
- Running time: 2 hours (semi-finals); 3 hours 30 minutes (final)
- Production companies: Radiotelevisão Portuguesa (RTP; 1964–2003); Rádio e Televisão de Portugal (RTP; 2004–present)

Original release
- Release: 2 February 1964 – present

Festival da Canção (Portuguese: [fɨʃtiˈval dɐ kɐ̃ˈsɐ̃w]; "Song Festival") or Festival RTP da Canção is the name given to the national festival produced and broadcast by Rádio e Televisão de Portugal (RTP) to select its entry for the Eurovision Song Contest. It was first held in 1964.

== History ==
Selection of former logos

The logo in 1980

The logo in 1989

Like most music festivals in isolated countries, the Festival da Canção was a very important event for the still-incipient Portuguese music industry of the 1960s and 1970s. Left-wing composers and writers would try to squeeze subversive lyrics in the contest, with great effect. After the 1974 revolution, incidentally code-triggered by that year's winner being played on national radio, Portugal became increasingly open to foreign culture, thus deeming the festival as a lesser musical event, dominated by below-standard pop songs with little or no impact in the industry, although remaining a popular TV show.

The 1990s saw a recovery of the contest's image, then considered a viable means for a new singer to start a career. Internationally acclaimed Portuguese singers Dulce Pontes and Sara Tavares made their debut in the 1991 and 1994 editions, respectively. Many other unknown performers like Lucia Moniz and Anabela leaped to national stardom after taking the RTP trophy.

After reaching an all-time high sixth place in the Eurovision Song Contest 1996, the festival steadily declined from then on. In 2000, the winner, "Sonhos mágicos" performed by Liana, did not participate in that year's Eurovision, as Portugal had been relegated from the contest after two consecutive poor showings in 1998 and 1999; this would be the second time in the festival's history that the winner did not participate in Eurovision. In 2002, the Festival da Canção was placed on hiatus, contradicting the tradition of staging a festival even without participating in that year's Eurovision Song Contest, as happened in 2000 and 1970. From 2001, the festival saw consecutive changes of format. 2005 saw RTP commissioning a song for Eurovision, rather than organizing some kind of competition for select a national entry.

Since 2006, RTP has settled for a traditional multi-singer, multi-composer competitive format, claiming the memory of older contests and songs. Producers have since been invited to come up with songs, lyrics and singers, and the 2007 result with Sabrina almost making it to the Eurovision final, gave RTP the necessary confidence to maintain the current format. In 2009, an open call for songs was held by RTP, abolishing the invited producers method, with online voting deciding the qualifiers to the televised final from a list of 24 songs, with 12 competing in the live contest.

More changes to the format of the contest were made in 2010. Two semi-finals and a final are now held to select the winner. Foreign composers were once again permitted to compete. Since 2017, different languages are allowed to compete.

The 2020 edition of the festival marked the third time in its history where the winner was unable to participate in Eurovision, as the contest itself was cancelled due to the COVID-19 pandemic.

For the 2026 edition, the rule obliging the winner to represent Portugal at Eurovision was replaced with a provision stating that the winner could decide to participate or not in Eurovision. Additionally, it was decided that the winner of the previous edition would have the ability to select one artist to participate in the festival.

== Winners ==
Table key
#	Winner
†	Second place
‡	Third place
◁	Last place

Year	Song	Artist	Songwriter(s)	Eurovision result			
Year	Song	Artist	Songwriter(s)	Final	Points	Semi	Points
1964	"Oração"	António Calvário	João Nobre, Francisco Nicholson, Rogério Bracinha	13th ◁	0	No semi-finals	
1965	"Sol de inverno"	Simone de Oliveira	Carlos Nóbrega e Sousa, Jerónimo Bragança	13th	1	No semi-finals	
1966	"Ele e ela"	Madalena Iglésias	Carlos Canelhas	13th	6	No semi-finals	
1967	"O vento mudou"	Eduardo Nascimento	Nuno Nazareth Fernandes, João Magalhães Pereira	12th	3	No semi-finals	
1968	"Verão"	Carlos Mendes	Pedro Vaz Osório, José Alberto Diogo	11th	5	No semi-finals	
1969	"Desfolhada portuguesa"	Simone de Oliveira	Nuno Nazareth Fernandes, José Carlos Ary dos Santos	15th	4	No semi-finals	
1970	"Onde vais rio que eu canto"	Sérgio Borges	Carlos Nóbrega e Sousa, Joaquim Pedro Gonçalves	Did not enter		No semi-finals	
1971	"Menina do alto da serra"	Tonicha	Nuno Nazareth Fernandes, José Carlos Ary dos Santos	9th	83	No semi-finals	
1972	"A festa da vida"	Carlos Mendes	José Calvário, José Niza	7th	90	No semi-finals	
1973	"Tourada"	Fernando Tordo	Fernando Tordo, José Carlos Ary dos Santos	10th	80	No semi-finals	
1974	"E depois do adeus"	Paulo de Carvalho	José Calvário, José Niza	14th ◁	3	No semi-finals	
1975	"Madrugada"	Duarte Mendes	José Luís Tinoco	16th	16	No semi-finals	
1976	"Uma flor de verde pinho"	Carlos do Carmo	José Niza, Manuel Alegre	12th	24	No semi-finals	
1977	"Portugal no coração"	Os Amigos	Fernando Tordo, José Carlos Ary dos Santos	14th	18	No semi-finals	
1978	"Dai li dou"	Gemini	Vítor Mamede, Carlos Quintas	17th	5	No semi-finals	
1979	"Sobe, sobe, balão sobe"	Manuela Bravo	Carlos Nóbrega e Sousa	9th	64	No semi-finals	
1980	"Um grande, grande amor"	José Cid	José Cid	7th	71	No semi-finals	
1981	"Playback"	Carlos Paião	Carlos Paião	18th	9	No semi-finals	
1982	"Bem bom"	Doce	Pedro Brito, Tozé Brito, António Pinho	13th	32	No semi-finals	
1983	"Esta balada que te dou"	Armando Gama	Armando Gama	13th	33	No semi-finals	
1984	"Silêncio e tanta gente"	Maria Guinot	Maria Guinot	11th	38	No semi-finals	
1985	"Penso em ti (eu sei)"	Adelaide	Tozé Brito, Adelaide Ferreira, Luís Fernando	18th	9	No semi-finals	
1986	"Não sejas mau para mim"	Dora	Guilherme Inês, Zé Da Ponte, Luís Manuel de Oliveira Fernandes	14th	28	No semi-finals	
1987	"Neste barco à vela"	Nevada	Alfredo Azinheira, Jorge Mendes	18th	15	No semi-finals	
1988	"Voltarei"	Dora	José Niza, José Calvário	18th	5	No semi-finals	
1989	"Conquistador"	Da Vinci	Ricardo, Pedro Luís	16th	39	No semi-finals	
1990	"Sempre, há sempre alguém"	Nucha	Luís Filipe, Ian van Dijck, Frederico Pereira, Francisco Pereira	20th	9	No semi-finals	
1991	"Lusitana paixão"	Dulce Pontes	Jorge Quintela, José Da Ponte, Fred Micaelo	8th	62	No semi-finals	
1992	"Amor d'água fresca"	Dina	Ondina Veloso, Rosa Lobato de Faria	17th	26	No semi-finals	
1993	"A cidade (até ser dia)"	Anabela	Paulo de Carvalho, Marco Quelhas, Pedro Abrantes	10th	60	No semi-finals	
1994	"Chamar a música"	Sara Tavares	João Mota Oliveira, Rosa Lobato de Faria	8th	73	No semi-finals	
1995	"Baunilha e chocolate"	Tó Cruz	António Vitorino d'Almeida, Rosa Lobato de Faria	21st	5	No semi-finals	
1996	"O meu coração não tem cor"	Lúcia Moniz	Pedro Osório, José Fanha	6th	92	18	32
1997	"Antes do adeus"	Célia Lawson	Rosa Lobato de Faria, Thilo Krassman	24th ◁	0	No semi-finals	
1998	"Se eu te pudesse abraçar"	Alma Lusa	José Cid	12th	36	No semi-finals	
1999	"Como tudo começou"	Rui Bandeira	Jorge do Carmo, Tó Andrade	21st	12	No semi-finals	
2000	"Sonhos mágicos"	Liana	Gerardo Rodrigues, Maria da Conceição Norte	Did not enter		No semi-finals	
2001	"Só sei ser feliz assim"	MTM	Marco Quelhas	17th	18	No semi-finals	
2003	"Deixa-me sonhar"	Rita Guerra	Paulo Martins	22nd	13	No semi-finals	
2004	"Foi magia"	Sofia Vitória	Paulo Neves	Failed to qualify		15th	38
2006	"Coisas de nada"	Nonstop	José Manuel Afonso, Elvis Veiguinha	Failed to qualify		19th	26
2007	"Dança comigo"	Sabrina	Emanuel, Tó Maria Vinhas	Failed to qualify		11th	88
2008	"Senhora do mar"	Vânia Fernandes	Andrej Babić, Carlos Coelho	13th	69	2	120
2009	"Todas as ruas do amor"	Flor-de-Lis	Paulo Pereira, Pedro Marques	15th	57	8	70
2010	"Há dias assim"	Filipa Azevedo	Augusto Madureira	18th	43	4	89
2011	"A luta é alegria"	Homens da Luta	Jel	Failed to qualify		18th	22
2012	"Vida minha"	Filipa Sousa	Andrej Babić, Carlos Coelho	Failed to qualify		13th	39
2014	"Quero ser tua"	Suzy	Emanuel	Failed to qualify		11th	39
2015	"Há um mar que nos separa"	Leonor Andrade	Miguel Gameiro	Failed to qualify		14th	19
2017	"Amar pelos dois"	Salvador Sobral	Luísa Sobral	1st	758	1st	370
2018	"O jardim"	Cláudia Pascoal	Isaura	26th ◁	39	Host country	
2019	"Telemóveis"	Conan Osíris	Conan Osíris	Failed to qualify		15th	51
2020	"Medo de sentir"	Elisa	Marta Carvalho	Contest cancelled due to COVID-19 pandemic			
2021	"Love Is on My Side"	The Black Mamba	Pedro Tatanka	12th	153	4	239
2022	"Saudade, saudade"	Maro	Maro, John Blanda	9th	207	4	208
2023	"Ai coração"	Mimicat	Marisa Mena, Luís Pereira	23rd	59	9	74
2024	"Grito"	Iolanda	Alberto Hernández, Iolanda Costa	10th	152	8	58
2025	"Deslocado"	Napa	João Lourenço Gomes, João Rodrigues, Diogo Góis, Francisco Sousa, André Santos, Guilherme Gomes	21st	50	9	56
2026	"Rosa"	Bandidos do Cante	Duarte Farias, Miguel Costa, Luís Aleixo, Francisco Pestana, Francisco Raposo, Kasha, Gui Alface, Gonçalo Narciso e Bluay	Failed to qualify		12th	74

== Hosts ==
1960s

- 1964: Henrique Mendes and Maria Helena Fialho Gouveia
- 1965: Henrique Mendes
- 1966: Henrique Mendes and Maria Fernanda
- 1967: Henrique Mendes and Isabel Wolmar
- 1968: Henrique Mendes and Maria Fernanda
- 1969: Lourdes Norberto

1970s

- 1970: Maria Fernanda and Carlos Cruz
- 1971: Henrique Mendes and Ana Maria Lucas
- 1972: Alice Cruz and Carlos Cruz
- 1973: Alice Cruz and Artur Agostinho
- 1974: Glória de Matos and Artur Agostinho
- 1975: Maria Elisa and José Nuno Martins
- 1976: Eládio Clímaco and Ana Zanatti
- 1977: Nicolau Breyner and Herman José
- 1978: Eládio Clímaco and Maria José Azevedo
- 1979: José Fialho Gouveia and Manuela Matos

1980s

- 1980: Eládio Clímaco and Ana Zanatti
- 1981: Eládio Clímaco and Rita Ribeiro
- 1982: Alice Cruz, José Fialho Gouveia, Ivone Silva and Camilo de Oliveira
- 1983: Eládio Clímaco and Valentina Torres
- 1984: Manuela Moura Guedes and José Fialho Gouveia
- 1985: Eládio Clímaco, Margarida Mercês de Melo and José Fialho Gouveia
- 1986: Eládio Clímaco, Ana Zanatti, José Fialho Gouveia, Henrique Mendes and Maria Helena
- 1987: Ana Zanatti
- 1988: Ana Paula Reis, Valentina Torres and António Sequeira
- 1989: Manuela Carlos and António Vitorino de Almeida

1990s

- 1990: Ana do Carmo and Nicolau Breyner
- 1991: Júlio Isidro and Ana Paula Reis
- 1992: Eládio Clímaco and Ana Zanatti (final); Júlio Isidro (semi-final)
- 1993: Margarida Mercês de Melo and António Sala (final); Júlio Isidro (semi-final)
- 1994: Ana Paula Reis and Nicolau Breyner (final); Ana do Carmo and Luís de Matos (semi-final)
- 1995: Carlos Mendes, Sofia Morais and Herman José
- 1996: Isabel Angelino and Carlos Cruz
- 1997: Cristina Caras Lindas and António Sala (final); Isabel Angelino (semi-final)
- 1998: Lúcia Moniz and Carlos Ribeiro
- 1999: Manuel Luís Goucha and Alexandra Lencastre

2000s

- 2000: Rita Ferro Rodrigues and Gaspar Borges
- 2001: Sónia Araújo and Cristina Möhler
- 2003: Catarina Furtado
- 2004: Catarina Furtado
- 2005: Eládio Clímaco and Tânia Ribas de Oliveira
- 2006: Isabel Angelino and Jorge Gabriel
- 2007: Isabel Angelino and Jorge Gabriel
- 2008: Sílvia Alberto
- 2009: Sílvia Alberto

2010s

- 2010: Sílvia Alberto
- 2011: Sílvia Alberto
- 2012: Sílvia Alberto and Pedro Granger
- 2014: José Carlos Malato and Sílvia Alberto
- 2015: Júlio Isidro and Catarina Furtado
- 2017:
  - José Carlos Malato and Sónia Araújo (1st semi-final)
  - Jorge Gabriel and Tânia Ribas de Oliveira (2nd semi-final)
  - Catarina Furtado, Sílvia Alberto and Filomena Cautela (final)
- 2018:
  - Jorge Gabriel and José Carlos Malato (1st semi-final)
  - Sónia Araújo and Tânia Ribas de Oliveira (2nd semi-final)
  - Filomena Cautela and Pedro Fernandes (final)
- 2019:
  - Sónia Araújo and Tânia Ribas de Oliveira (1st semi-final)
  - Jorge Gabriel and José Carlos Malato (2nd semi-final)
  - Filomena Cautela and Vasco Palmeirim (final)

2020s

- 2020:
  - Jorge Gabriel and Tânia Ribas de Oliveira (1st semi-final)
  - José Carlos Malato and Sónia Araújo (2nd semi-final)
  - Filomena Cautela and Vasco Palmeirim (final)
- 2021:
  - Jorge Gabriel and Sónia Araújo (1st semi-final)
  - José Carlos Malato and Tânia Ribas de Oliveira (2nd semi-final)
  - Filomena Cautela and Vasco Palmeirim (final)
- 2022:
  - Jorge Gabriel and Sónia Araújo (1st semi-final)
  - José Carlos Malato and Tânia Ribas de Oliveira (2nd semi-final)
  - Filomena Cautela and Vasco Palmeirim (final)
- 2023:
  - José Carlos Malato and Tânia Ribas de Oliveira (1st semi-final)
  - Jorge Gabriel and Sónia Araújo (2nd semi-final)
  - Filomena Cautela and Vasco Palmeirim (final)
- 2024:
  - José Carlos Malato and Tânia Ribas de Oliveira (1st semi-final)
  - Jorge Gabriel and Sónia Araújo (2nd semi-final)
  - Filomena Cautela and Vasco Palmeirim (final)
- 2025:
  - Jorge Gabriel and José Carlos Malato (1st semi-final)
  - Tânia Ribas de Oliveira and Sónia Araújo (2nd semi-final)
  - Filomena Cautela and Vasco Palmeirim (final)
- 2026:
  - Vasco Palmeirim, Catarina Maia and Alexandre Guimarães (1st semi-final)
  - Filomena Cautela, Catarina Maia and Alexandre Guimarães (2nd semi-final)
  - Filomena Cautela, Vasco Palmeirim, Catarina Maia and Alexandre Guimarães (final)

=== Green room presenters ===
Year	Presenter(s)
2009	Sérgio Mateus
2010	Sérgio Mateus
2011	Joana Teles
2012	Joana Teles
2014	Joana Teles
2015	Jorge Gabriel and Joana Teles (1st semi-final); José Carlos Malato and Sílvia Alberto (2nd semi-final); Júlio Isidro and Catarina Furtado (final)
2017	Filomena Cautela
2018	Inês Lopes Gonçalves
2019	Inês Lopes Gonçalves
2020	Inês Lopes Gonçalves
2021	Inês Lopes Gonçalves
2022	Inês Lopes Gonçalves
2023	Inês Lopes Gonçalves
2024	Inês Lopes Gonçalves and Wandson Lisboa
2025	Wandson Lisboa, Alexandre Guimarães and Catarina Maia
2026	Catarina Maia and Alexandre Guimarães

== Venues ==
=== Final ===
Total	City	Venues (years)
46	Lisbon	RTP Television Center (1964–1968, 1976–1977, 1986, 1988, 2005, 2012, 2015, 2021–2025)
46	Lisbon	Teatro São Luiz (1969, 1972, 1980, 1992, 1993, 1994, 1998)
46	Lisbon	Cinema Monumental (1970, 1979)
46	Lisbon	Cinema Tivoli (1971, 1995)
46	Lisbon	Teatro Maria Matos (1973–1975, 1981, 1982)
46	Lisbon	Teatro Villaret (1978)
46	Lisbon	Auditório Europa (1984)
46	Lisbon	Coliseu dos Recreios (1985, 1997, 2017)
46	Lisbon	Feira Internacional de Lisboa (1991, 2006)
46	Lisbon	Teatro Politeama (1996)
46	Lisbon	Sala Tejo do Pavilhão Atlântico (1999–2000, 2007)
46	Lisbon	Teatro Camões (2008, 2009, 2011)
46	Lisbon	Praça de Touros do Campo Pequeno (2010)
46	Lisbon	Convento do Beato (2014)
1	Porto	Coliseu do Porto (1983)
1	Funchal	Casino Park Funchal (1987)
1	Évora	Teatro Garcia de Resende (1989)
1	Estoril	Casino Estoril (1990)
1	Santa Maria da Feira	Europarque (2001)
1	Venda do Pinheiro	Endemol Studios (2003)
1	Mem Martins	Endemol Studios (2004)
1	Guimarães	Multiusos de Guimarães (2018)
1	Portimão	Portimão Arena (2019)
1	Elvas	Coliseu Comendador Rondão Almeida (2020)
1	Paço d’Arcos	Estúdios da Valentim de Carvalho (2026)

=== Semi-finals ===
Since 2017, all semi-finals have been hosted at the RTP Television Center in Lisbon.

== See also ==
- Portugal in the Eurovision Song Contest
- List of historic rock festivals
