= Portugal in the Eurovision Song Contest 2014 =

- Eurovision Song Contest 2014
- Participating broadcaster: Rádio e Televisão de Portugal (RTP)
- Country: Portugal
- Selection process: Festival da Canção 2014
- Selection date: 15 March 2014

Competing entry
- Song: "Quero ser tua"
- Artist: Suzy
- Songwriters: Emanuel

Placement
- Semi-final result: Failed to qualify (11th)

Participation chronology

Portugal was represented at the Eurovision Song Contest 2014 with the song "Quero ser tua" written by Emanuel, and performed by Suzy. In November 2013, the Portuguese participating broadcaster, Rádio e Televisão de Portugal (RTP), announced that they would be returning to the Eurovision Song Contest after a one-year absence following their withdrawal in 2013 due to financial reasons. RTP organised the national final Festival da Canção 2014 in order to select its entry for the contest. After a semi-final and a final which took place in March 2014, "Quero ser tua" performed by Suzy emerged as the winner after gaining 41.56% of the public televote.

Portugal was drawn to compete in the first semi-final of the Eurovision Song Contest which took place on 6 May 2014. Performing during the show in position 13, "Quero ser tua" was not announced among the top 10 entries of the first semi-final and therefore did not qualify to compete in the final. It was later revealed that Portugal placed eleventh out of the 16 participating countries in the semi-final with 39 points.

== Background ==
Prior to the 2014 contest, Radiotelevisão Portuguesa (RTP) until 2003, and Rádio e Televisão de Portugal (RTP) since 2004, had participated in the Eurovision Song Contest representing Portugal forty-six times since their first entry in 1964. Their highest placing in the contest was sixth, achieved in 1996 with the song "O meu coração não tem cor" performed by Lúcia Moniz. Following the introduction of semi-finals for the 2004, Portugal had featured in only three finals. Their least successful result has been last place, achieved on three occasions, most recently in 1997 with the song "Antes do adeus" performed by Célia Lawson. They have also received nul points on two occasions: in 1964 and 1997. The nation failed to qualify to the final in 2012 with the song "Vida minha" performed by Filipa Sousa.

As part of its duties as participating broadcaster, RTP organises the selection of its entry in the Eurovision Song Contest and broadcasts the event in the country. The broadcaster has traditionally selected the Portuguese entry for the contest via the music competition Festival da Canção, with exceptions in 1988 and in 2005 when the entries were internally selected. RTP announced in November 2012 that the country would not participate in 2013 for financial reasons. Following their one-year absence, RTP confirmed its participation in the 2014 contest on 7 November 2013. On 14 January 2014, the broadcaster revealed details regarding their selection procedure and announced the organization of Festival da Canção 2014 in order to select its entry.

== Before Eurovision ==
=== Festival da Canção 2014 ===
The logo of Festival da Canção 2014

Festival da Canção 2014 was the 49th edition of Festival da Canção that selected Portugal's entry for the Eurovision Song Contest 2014. Ten entries competed in the competition that consisted of a semi-final held on 8 March 2014 leading to a five-song final on 15 March 2014. Both shows of the competition took place at the Convento do Beato in Lisbon, hosted by Sílvia Alberto and José Carlos Malato with Joana Teles hosting from the green room, and were broadcast on RTP1, RTP África, RTP Internacional and RTP HD as well as online via the broadcaster's official website rtp.pt.

==== Format ====
The format of the competition consisted of two shows: a semi-final on 8 March 2014 and the final on 15 March 2014. The semi-final featured ten competing entries from which five advanced from the show to complete the five song lineup in the final. Results during the semi-final and the final were determined exclusively by public televoting. The public televote for the final was opened following the semi-final and closed during the show.

==== Competing entries ====
Ten Portuguese and foreign composers were invited by RTP for the competition. The composers both created the songs, which were required to be in Portuguese, and selected its performers with the approval of RTP. The selected composers were revealed on 28 January 2014, while the competing artists were revealed on 11 February 2014. The composers were:

- Andrej Babić
- Emanuel
- Hélder Godinho (Note: Replaced Tiago Pais Dias following his withdrawal from the competition on 6 February 2014)
- Jan Van Dijck
- João Matos
- João Só
- Luís Fernando, Rui Fingers and Ricardo Afonso
- Marc Paelinck
- Nuno Feist
- Tozé Santos

==== Semi-final ====
The semi-final took place on 8 March 2014. Ten entries competed and five advanced to the final based on the results of a public televote. In addition to the performances of the competing entries, Portuguese Eurovision 1985 entrant Adelaide Ferreira, Portuguese Eurovision 1986 and 1988 entrants Dora, Portuguese Eurovision 1995 entrant Tó Cruz and Portuguese Eurovision 2008 entrant Vânia Fernandes performed as the interval acts.

Semi-final – 8 March 2014
R/O	Artist	Song	Songwriter(s)	Place
1	Catarina Pereira	"Mea culpa"	Andrej Babić, Carlos Coelho	1
2	Ivo Lucas	"Eu vou"	João Só	9
3	Zana	"Nas asas da sorte"	Jan van Dijck, Paulo Abreu Lima	3
4	Carla Ribeiro	"Mais para dar"	Hélder Godinho, Marina Ferraz	6
5	Ricardo Afonso	"Emoção"	Ricardo Afonso, Luís Fernando, Rui Fingers	8
6	Rui Andrade	"Ao teu encontro"	Marc Paelinck, Rui Andrade	2
7	Lara Afonso	"O teu segredo"	João Matos, Miguel Ferrador	7
8	Raquel Guerra	"Sonhos roubados"	Nuno Feist, Nuno Marques da Silva	4
9	Madalena Trabuco	"Coração de filigrana"	Tozé Santos	10
10	Suzy	"Quero ser tua"	Emanuel	5

==== Final ====
The final took place on 15 March 2014. The five entries that qualified from the preceding semi-final competed and the winner, "Quero ser tua" performed by Suzy, was selected solely by a public televote. In addition to the performances of the competing entries, Henrique Feist and Portuguese Eurovision 1996 entrant Lucia Móniz performed as the interval acts.

Final – 15 March 2014
R/O	Artist	Song	Televote	Place
1	Rui Andrade	"Ao teu encontro"	14.56%	3
2	Catarina Pereira	"Mea culpa"	23.58%	2
3	Zana	"Nas asas da sorte"	11.39%	4
4	Raquel Guerra	"Sonhos roubados"	8.91%	5
5	Suzy	"Quero ser tua"	41.56%	1

=== Controversy ===
Following Suzy's victory at Festival da Canção 2014, second and third-placed acts Catarina Pereira and Rui Andrade raised concerns about the outcome of the competition, which involved suspicions that the composer of "Quero ser tua", Emanuel, had influenced the televote in favour of the victory of his entry. The composer of Pereira's song, Carlos Coelho, stated that he would request an audit due to the discrepancy of the results and violation of rules, involving the difference of the number of votes allowed per telephone in both shows, the use of stage props, and the editing and reproduction rights of the competing songs.

=== Promotion ===
Suzy made several appearances across Europe to specifically promote "Quero ser tua" as the Portuguese Eurovision entry. On 5 April, Suzy performed during the Eurovision in Concert event which was held at the Melkweg venue in Amsterdam, Netherlands and hosted by Cornald Maas and Sandra Reemer. She also performed during the London Eurovision Party on 13 April, which was held at the Café de Paris venue in London, United Kingdom and hosted by Nicki French and Paddy O'Connell.

== At Eurovision ==
Suzy presenting herself at the Eurovision Song Contest 2014

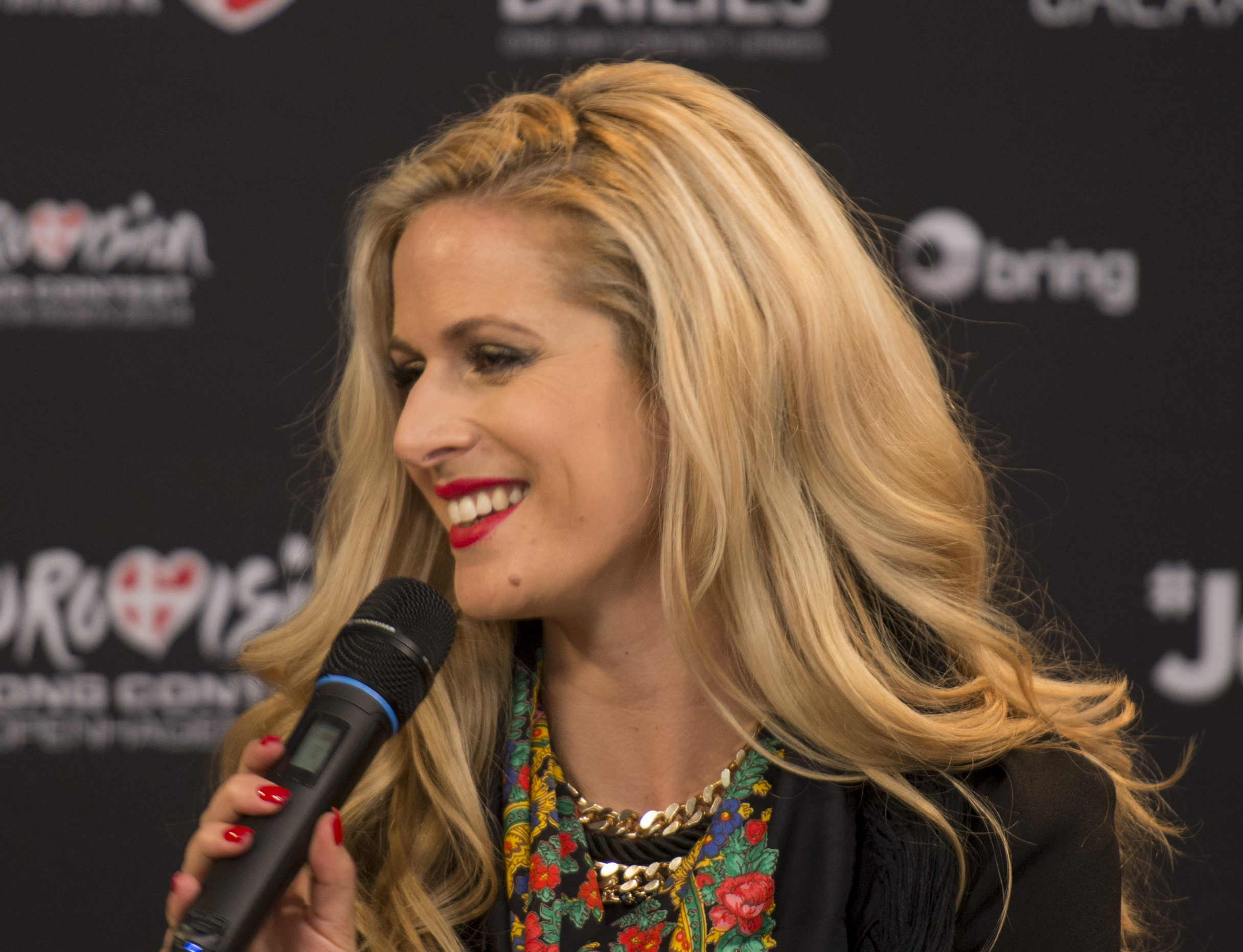
Suzy during a press meet and greet

According to Eurovision rules, all nations with the exceptions of the host country and the "Big Five" (France, Germany, Italy, Spain and the United Kingdom) are required to qualify from one of two semi-finals in order to compete for the final; the top ten countries from each semi-final progress to the final. The European Broadcasting Union (EBU) split up the competing countries into six different pots based on voting patterns from previous contests, with countries with favourable voting histories put into the same pot. On 20 January 2014, a special allocation draw was held which placed each country into one of the two semi-finals, as well as which half of the show they would perform in. Portugal was placed into the first semi-final, to be held on 6 May 2014, and was scheduled to perform in the second half of the show.

Once all the competing songs for the 2014 contest had been released, the running order for the semi-finals was decided by the shows' producers rather than through another draw, so that similar songs were not placed next to each other. Portugal was set to perform in position 13, following the entry from San Marino and before the entry from Netherlands.

In Portugal, the three shows were broadcast on RTP1, RTP1 HD and RTP Internacional with commentary by Sílvia Alberto. The first semi-final and the final were broadcast live, while the second semi-final was broadcast on delay. The Portuguese spokesperson, who announced the Portuguese votes during the final, was Joana Teles.

=== Semi-final ===
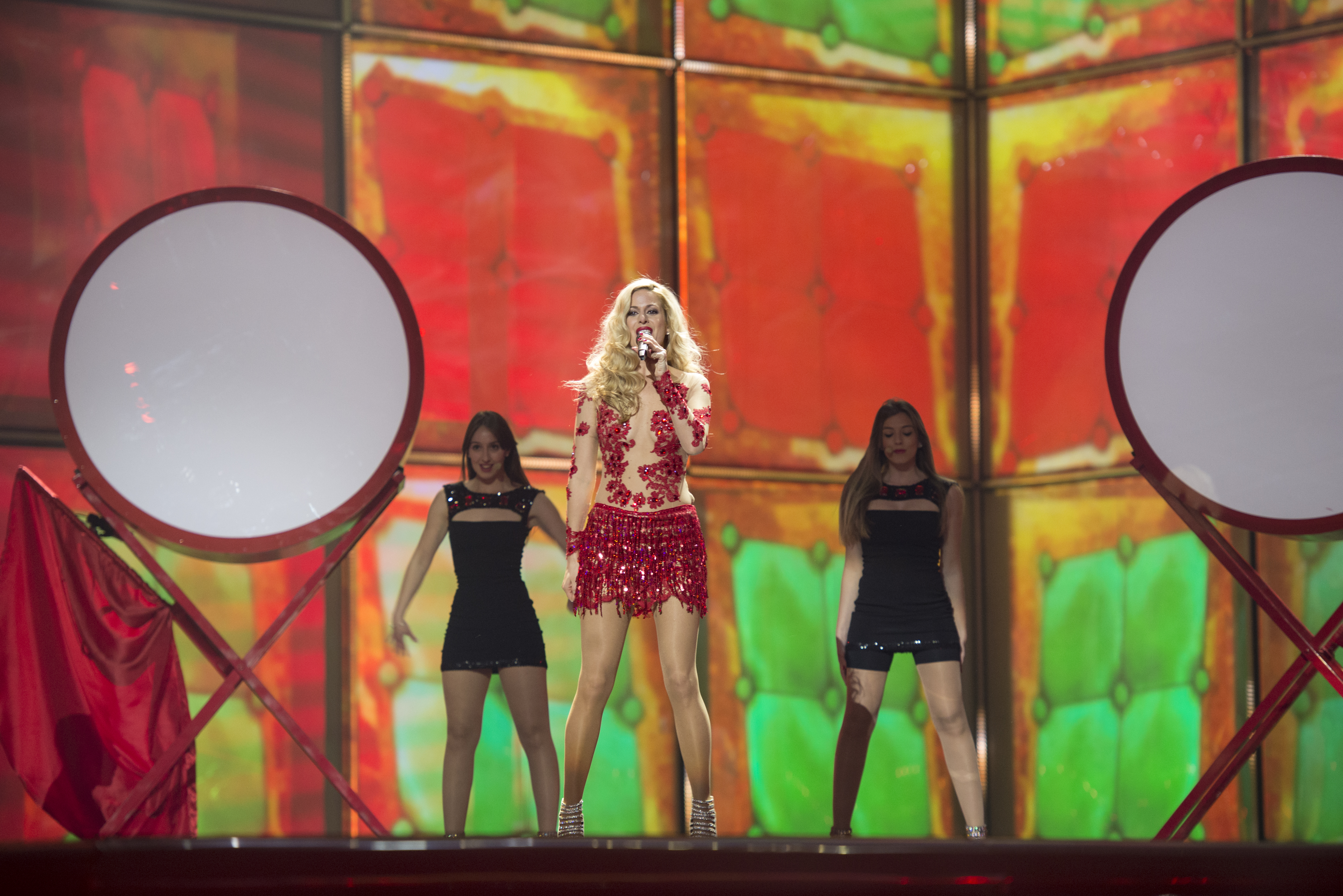
Suzy during a rehearsal before the first semi-final

Suzy took part in technical rehearsals on 29 April and 2 May, followed by dress rehearsals on 5 and 6 May. This included the jury final where professional juries of each country watched and voted on the competing entries.

The Portuguese performance featured Suzy dressed in a red short outfit, designed by designer João Rolo, performing choreography with two backing vocalists, two dancers playing two large drums that light as they were beat and waving red flags, and a percussionist performing on a hand drum. The LED screens displayed red, green and yellow colours with a wind machine special effect being used. The performance was choreographed by Paulo Magalhães. The backing vocalists were Marta Mota and Sara Campina, the dancers were Luís Filipe Pimenta and Renato Nobre, while the percussionist was Jefferson Negreiros.

At the end of the show, Portugal was not announced among the top 10 entries in the first semi-final and therefore failed to qualify to compete in the final. It was later revealed that Portugal placed eleventh in the semi-final, receiving a total of 39 points.

=== Voting ===
Voting during the three shows involved each country awarding points from 1–8, 10 and 12 as determined by a combination of 50% national jury and 50% televoting. Each nation's jury consisted of five music industry professionals who were citizens of the country they represent, with their names published before the contest to ensure transparency. This jury was asked to judge each contestant based on: vocal capacity; the stage performance; the song's composition and originality; and the overall impression by the act. In addition, no member of a national jury could be related in any way to any of the competing acts in such a way that they cannot vote impartially and independently. The individual rankings of each jury member were released shortly after the grand final.

Following the release of the full split voting by the EBU after the conclusion of the competition, it was revealed that Portugal had placed seventh with the public televote and sixteenth (last) with the jury vote in the first semi-final. In the public vote, Portugal scored 72 points, while with the jury vote, Portugal scored 17 points.

Below is a breakdown of points awarded to Portugal and awarded by Portugal in the first semi-final and grand final of the contest, and the breakdown of the jury voting and televoting conducted during the two shows:

==== Points awarded to Portugal ====
Points awarded to Portugal (Semi-final 1)
Score	Country
12 points	
10 points	
8 points	Spain
7 points	
6 points	Belgium
5 points	France
4 points	Sweden
3 points	Armenia; Denmark; Moldova; Montenegro
2 points	Netherlands
1 point	Albania; Azerbaijan

==== Points awarded by Portugal ====
Points awarded by Portugal (Semi-final 1)
Score	Country
12 points	Netherlands
10 points	Hungary
8 points	Sweden
7 points	Ukraine
6 points	Montenegro
5 points	Russia
4 points	Armenia
3 points	Latvia
2 points	Azerbaijan
1 point	Iceland

Points awarded by Portugal (Final)
Score	Country
12 points	Austria
10 points	Netherlands
8 points	Sweden
7 points	Switzerland
6 points	Hungary
5 points	Denmark
4 points	Armenia
3 points	Norway
2 points	Russia
1 point	Romania

==== Detailed voting results ====
The following members comprised the Portuguese jury:

- Paula Ferreira (jury chairperson) – event promoter
- José Cabrita – event promoter
- Jan Van Dijck – composer
- Ana Augusto – singer
- Marina Ferraz – lyricist

Detailed voting results from Portugal (Semi-final 1)
R/O	Country	P. Ferreira	J. Cabrita	J. van Dijck	A. Augusto	M. Ferraz	Jury Rank	Televote Rank	Combined Rank	Points
01	Armenia	13	7	7	1	4	7	10	7	4
02	Latvia	2	6	5	7	8	5	13	8	3
03	Estonia	10	8	12	15	7	11	11	14	
04	Sweden	1	4	3	6	3	3	4	3	8
05	Iceland	8	5	10	8	12	8	12	10	1
06	Albania	14	13	13	11	9	12	15	15	
07	Russia	5	9	11	12	11	9	5	6	5
08	Azerbaijan	6	1	4	4	5	4	14	9	2
09	Ukraine	9	12	9	9	13	10	2	4	7
10	Belgium	15	11	8	13	14	13	9	13	
11	Moldova	12	15	14	10	10	14	8	12	
12	San Marino	11	14	15	14	15	15	6	11	
13	Portugal									
14	Netherlands	3	2	2	2	6	2	1	1	12
15	Montenegro	7	10	6	5	2	6	7	5	6
16	Hungary	4	3	1	3	1	1	3	2	10

Detailed voting results from Portugal (Final)
R/O	Country	P. Ferreira	J. Cabrita	J. van Dijck	A. Augusto	M. Ferraz	Jury Rank	Televote Rank	Combined Rank	Points
01	Ukraine	19	21	15	18	19	20	4	12	
02	Belarus	17	12	18	13	23	16	23	23	
03	Azerbaijan	13	1	7	9	6	7	26	17	
04	Iceland	20	11	21	16	21	19	22	24	
05	Norway	18	7	3	10	4	8	13	8	3
06	Romania	21	24	17	23	20	22	2	10	1
07	Armenia	8	5	10	2	7	5	14	7	4
08	Montenegro	14	13	12	8	3	10	18	14	
09	Poland	24	23	25	17	26	23	16	22	
10	Greece	23	25	19	26	25	24	19	25	
11	Austria	9	4	20	1	1	6	1	1	12
12	Germany	12	14	8	7	10	11	20	15	
13	Sweden	1	10	6	6	5	3	6	3	8
14	France	26	22	24	25	24	26	24	26	
15	Russia	6	18	16	19	16	15	7	9	2
16	Italy	25	9	13	21	17	18	17	20	
17	Slovenia	11	15	14	12	9	12	25	21	
18	Finland	15	20	23	15	12	17	15	16	
19	Spain	16	19	22	20	15	21	3	11	
20	Switzerland	4	6	4	5	11	4	8	4	7
21	Hungary	3	3	2	3	2	1	12	5	6
22	Malta	7	16	11	11	18	13	21	18	
23	Denmark	5	8	9	14	13	9	9	6	5
24	Netherlands	2	2	1	4	8	2	5	2	10
25	San Marino	22	26	26	24	22	25	10	19	
26	United Kingdom	10	17	5	22	14	14	11	13	
