= Portugal in the Eurovision Song Contest 2001 =

- Eurovision Song Contest 2001
- Participating broadcaster: Radiotelevisão Portuguesa (RTP)
- Country: Portugal
- Selection process: Festival da Canção 2001
- Selection date: 7 March 2001

Competing entry
- Song: "Só sei ser feliz assim"
- Artist: MTM
- Songwriter: Marco Quelhas

Placement
- Final result: 17th, 18 points

Participation chronology

Portugal was represented at the Eurovision Song Contest 2001 with the song "Só sei ser feliz assim" written by Marco Quelhas and performed by the duo MTM. The Portuguese participating broadcaster, Radiotelevisão Portuguesa (RTP), returned to the Eurovision Song Contest after a one-year absence following their relegation in 2000 as one of the six countries with the lowest average scores over the previous five contests. RTP organised the national final Festival da Canção 2001 in order to select its entry for the contest. After five semi-finals and a final which took place between October 2000 and March 2001, "Só sei ser feliz assim" performed by MTM emerged as the winner after achieving the highest score following the combination of votes from 20 regional juries.

The song competed in the Eurovision Song Contest which took place on 12 May 2001. Performed during the show in position 11, it placed seventeenth out of the 23 participating songs from different countries, scoring 18 points.

== Background ==
Prior to the 2001 contest, Radiotelevisão Portuguesa (RTP) had participated in the Eurovision Song Contest representing Portugal thirty-five times since its first entry in 1964. Its highest placing in the contest was sixth, achieved in 1996 with the song "O meu coração não tem cor" performed by Lúcia Moniz. Its least successful result has been last place, which it has achieved on three occasions, most recently in 1997 with the song "Antes do adeus" performed by Célia Lawson. The Portuguese entry has also received nul points on two occasions; in 1964 and 1997.

RTP has traditionally selected the Portuguese entry for the Eurovision Song Contest via the music competition Festival da Canção, with an exception in 1988 when it selected its entry internally. The broadcaster organized Festival da Canção 2001 in order to select the 2001 Portuguese entry.

== Before Eurovision ==
=== Festival da Canção 2001 ===
The logo of Festival da Canção 2001

Festival da Canção 2001 was the 38th edition of Festival da Canção that selected the Portuguese entry for the Eurovision Song Contest 2001. Artists and composers were able to submit their entries for the competition between 12 June 2000 and 12 July 2000, and 50 entries were selected from 572 submissions received. Among the competing artists was former Eurovision Song Contest entrant Pedro Soares (member of the group Vudoo), who represented Portugal in the 1998 contest as a member of Alma Lusa. Marisa Mena, who competed under the moniker Izamena, would later go on to represent Portugal at the Eurovision Song Contest 2023 as Mimicat.

The format of the competition consisted of six shows taking place in different cities across Portugal: five semi-finals and a final. Each semi-final featured ten competing entries from which two as determined by a jury panel appointed by RTP advanced from each show to complete the ten song lineup in the final. Results during the final were determined by the votes from 20 regional juries. All six shows of the competition were hosted by Sónia Araújo and Cristina Möhler and broadcast on RTP1 and RTP Internacional.

Competition schedule
Show	Date	City	Venue
Semi-final 1	20 October 2000	Setúbal	Forum Municipal Luísa Todi
Semi-final 2	17 November 2000	Leiria	Teatro José Lúcio da Silva
Semi-final 3	15 December 2000	Faro	Conservatório Regional do Algarve
Semi-final 4	19 January 2001	Funchal	Teatro Municipal Baltazar Dias
Semi-final 5	16 February 2001	Ponta Delgada	Teatro Micaelense
Final	7 March 2001	Santa Maria da Feira	Europarque

Competing entries
Artist	Song	Songwriter(s)
100 Rumo	"Parei o tempo"	Vítor Santos
Almabranca	"Seja qual for a estrada"	Almabranca
Ana Laíns	"Há sempre alguém que nos quer"	Ana Laíns
Ana Sofia	"Marcados no destino"	Daniel Duarte, Ana Sofia, Jéjé
António Laranjeira	"No olhar dos teus olhos"	Pereira Pinto, António Laranjeira
Baby Jane	"O paraíso é uma onda"	Ricardo Tomás, Hugo Simões
Bruno Airaff	"Rapariga loira"	Thilo Krasmann, Rosa Lobato de Faria
Carlos Massa	"Há outro lugar"	Carlos Massa
Cidália Silva	"Morrerei por ti"	Paulo Ferraz, Cidália Silva
Eden	"Na promessa desse olhar"	Gerardo Rodrigues, Maria da Conceição Norte
Elisabete Soares	"Tu és o ser"	Rui Batista, Elisabete Soares
Euro	"Amor, My Love"	Artur Jordão, Manuela Matos Silva
Fernando de Almeida	"Agora"	Fernando de Almeida
Filipe Fonseca and Inês Soares	"Amor em tons de azul pastel e branco"	Filipe Fonseca
Hugo Rodrigues	"Chuva brilhante"	Hugo Rodrigues
Izamena	"Mundo colorido"	Nuno Junqueira
Jaime Nascimento	"Fazer uma música só para ti"	Jaime Nascimento, Manuela Matos Silva
Jaime Nascimento	"Não há nada melhor"	Jaime Nascimento
Jaime Nascimento	"Nunca te despeças de mim"	Jaime Nascimento
José Orlando Pereira	"Descalça nos trigais"	Remo
Luís Mira	"Beleza divina"	Luís Mira, Dudo Godolfim
Luís Mira	"Queria-te"	Luís Mira, Teresa Silva
Lura and Paulo	"Da terra à lua"	Paulo Abreu Lima
Mané Crestejo	"Fechar os olhos (e olhar)"	Mané Crestejo, Bruno Travassos
Marés and Luar	"Amor e mar"	Luís Miguel Rijo, Joel Lopes, João Calha
Miguel Braga	"Milagres precisam-se"	Miguel Braga
Mónica Ferraz	"Secreta passagem"	Miguel Braga
MTM	"Só sei ser feliz assim"	Marco Quelhas
Nefelibatas	"Maré Nova"	Paulo Cavadas, Mónica Gil
Nina	"Valsinha de Abril"	Thilo Krasmann, Rosa Lobato de Faria
Nuno Junqueira	"Chamar por ti"	Nuno Junqueira
Pati	"Sempre sonhei"	Marco Quelhas
Patrícia Colaço and Duo Demo	"Choro no fado"	José Manuel Martins
Paula Duque	"Ventos da mudança"	Paulinho Lemos, Paulo Duque
Psique	"Pensar assim"	Manuel Guerra
Rita Leal	"Por ti saudade"	Pedro Moreira
Rosete and Duo Demo	"Brisas de Luanda"	António Carlos Goulart, José Manuel Martins
Rui Silvã	"No azul"	Rui Silvã
Sandra Soares	"Ter uma paixão"	Rui Filipe
Seita Interdita	"Lição de saber"	Acácio Augusto Miranda
Sónia Mota	"No tom das cores"	Américo Faria
Tânia de Sousa	"Viver para amar"	Luca
Tatiana Pinto	"O beijo do gato"	Vítor Reia, Domingos Caetano
Terrie Alves	"Canta comigo (canta meu povo)"	Terrie Alves
Tribo Urbana	"Poder voar"	Luiz Carvalho
Trilhos	"Cais, imenso mar"	Luís Lapa
Trilhos	"Perfume fino"	Luís Lapa
Trilhos	"Roda de amores"	Luís Lapa
Us 2	"Assim por ti"	Miguel Noronha de Andrade
Vudoo	"Na aldeia global"	Roberto Cartaxo, José Cid

==== Semi-finals ====
The five semi-finals took place between 20 October 2000 and 16 February 2001. In each semi-final ten entries competed and two advanced to the final based on the votes of a jury panel consisting of three permanent members (Tozé Brito, Luís Pedro Fonseca and José Calvário) and two varying members: Sara Tavares and Margarida Brandão for the first semi-final, Adelaide Ferreira and Sofia Lisboa for the second semi-final, Olavo Bilac and João de Almeida for the third semi-final, Rita Guerra and Luís Filipe for the fourth semi-final, and João Gil and Luís Alberto Bettencourt for the fifth semi-final.

Semi-final 1 – 20 October 2000
R/O	Artist	Song	Points	Place
1	Vudoo	"Na aldeia global"	35	3
2	Luís Mira	"Queria-te"	22	6
3	100 Rumo	"Parei o tempo"	18	8
4	Tribo Urbana	"Poder voar"	47	2
5	Nina	"Valsinha de Abril"	31	4
6	Euro	"Amor, My Love"	48	1
7	Nefelibatas	"Maré Nova"	26	5
8	Rui Silvã	"No azul"	19	7
9	Baby Jane	"O paraíso é uma onda"	18	8
10	Psique	"Pensar assim"	11	10

Semi-final 2 – 17 November 2000
R/O	Artist	Song	Points	Place
1	Filipe Fonseca and Inês Soares	"Amor em tons de azul pastel e branco"	41	3
2	Marés and Luar	"Amor e mar"	22	7
3	Trilhos	"Perfume fino"	28	5
4	Ana Sofia	"Marcados no destino"	22	7
5	Jaime Nascimento	"Não há nada melhor"	16	9
6	Ana Laíns	"Há sempre alguém que nos quer"	31	4
7	Seita Interdita	"Lição de saber"	7	10
8	Nuno Junqueira	"Chamar por ti"	42	2
9	Pati	"Sempre sonhei"	23	6
10	Mónica Ferraz	"Secreta passagem"	43	1

Semi-final 3 – 15 December 2000
R/O	Artist	Song	Points	Place
1	Sónia Mota	"No tom das cores"	40	2
2	José Orlando Pereira	"Descalça nos trigais"	8	10
3	Hugo Rodrigues	"Chuva brilhante"	25	7
4	Patrícia Colaço and Duo Demo	"Choro no fado"	45	1
5	Lura and Paulo	"Da terra à lua"	32	5
6	Izamena	"Mundo colorido"	34	3
7	Almabranca	"Seja qual for a estrada"	30	6
8	Tatiana Pinto	"O beijo do gato"	34	3
9	Luís Mira	"Beleza divina"	10	9
10	Trilhos	"Cais, imenso mar"	17	8

Semi-final 4 – 19 January 2001
R/O	Artist	Song	Points	Place
1	Tânia de Sousa	"Viver para amar"	14	8
2	Fernando de Almeida	"Agora"	43	1
3	Elisabete Soares	"Tu és o ser"	42	2
4	Trilhos	"Roda de amores"	17	7
5	Bruno Airaff	"Rapariga loira"	27	6
6	Cidália Silva	"Morrerei por ti"	41	3
7	Sandra Soares	"Ter uma paixão"	32	5
8	Eden	"Na promessa desse olhar"	11	9
9	Mané Crestejo	"Fechar os olhos (e olhar)"	8	10
10	Paula Duque	"Ventos da mudança"	40	4

Semi-final 5 – 16 February 2001
R/O	Artist	Song	Points	Place
1	Rita Leal	"Por ti saudade"	22	6
2	Carlos Massa	"Há outro lugar"	29	5
3	Jaime Nascimento	"Nunca te despeças de mim"	20	8
4	Rosete and Duo Demo	"Brisas de Luanda"	22	6
5	António Laranjeira	"No olhar dos teus olhos"	34	3
6	Terrie Alves	"Canta comigo (canta meu povo)"	20	8
7	MTM	"Só sei ser feliz assim"	38	1
8	Us 2	"Assim por ti"	37	2
9	Miguel Braga	"Milagres precisam-se"	20	8
10	Jaime Nascimento	"Fazer uma música só para ti"	33	4

==== Final ====
The final took place on 7 March 2001, but the broadcast of the show was postponed until 11 March 2001 after two days of national mourning were declared due to the Hintze Ribeiro Bridge collapse. The ten entries that qualified from the five preceding semi-finals competed and the winner, "Só sei ser feliz assim" performed by MTM, was selected based on the votes of 20 regional juries.

Final – 7 March 2001
R/O	Artist	Song	Points	Place
1	Fernando de Almeida	"Agora"	226	4
2	Sónia Mota	"No tom das cores"	257	3
3	Euro	"Amor, My Love"	222	6
4	Us 2	"Assim por ti"	160	9
5	Elisabete Soares	"Tu és o ser"	207	7
6	Tribo Urbana	"Poder voar"	225	5
7	Patrícia Colaço and Duo Demo	"Choro no fado"	275	2
8	Nuno Junqueira	"Chamar por ti"	206	8
9	Mónica Ferraz	"Secreta passagem"	140	10
10	MTM	"Só sei ser feliz assim"	280	1

== At Eurovision ==
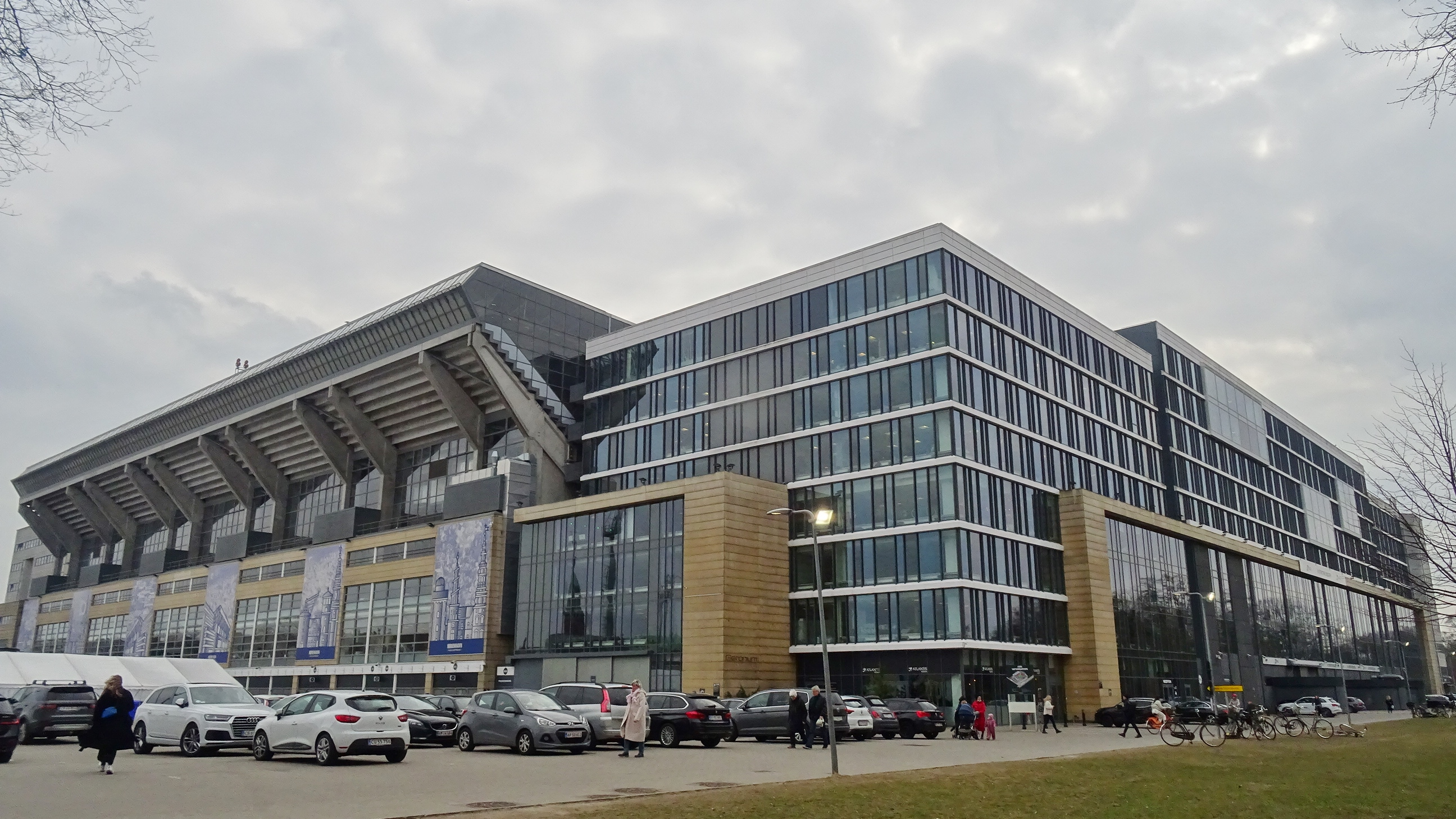
The Eurovision Song Contest 2001 took place at Parken Stadium in Copenhagen, Denmark.

The Eurovision Song Contest 2001 took place at Parken Stadium in Copenhagen, Denmark, on 12 May 2001. The relegation rules introduced for the 1997 contest were again utilised ahead of the 2001 contest, based on each country's average points total in previous contests. The 23 participants were made up of the host country, the "Big Four" countries (France, Germany, Spain and the United Kingdom), and the 12 countries with the highest average scores between the 1996 and 2000 contests competed in the final. On 9 November 2001, an allocation draw was held which determined the running order and Portugal was set to perform in position 11, following the entry from Croatia and before the entry from Ireland. Portugal finished in seventeenth place scoring 18 points.

The contest was broadcast on RTP1 and RTP Internacional, with commentary by Eládio Clímaco.

=== Voting ===
Below is a breakdown of points awarded to Portugal and awarded by Portugal in the contest. The nation awarded its 12 points to France in the contest.

RTP appointed Margarida Mercês de Melo to announce the results of the Portuguese televote during the final.

Points awarded to Portugal
Score	Country
12 points	France
10 points	
8 points	
7 points	
6 points	Spain
5 points	
4 points	
3 points	
2 points	
1 point	

Points awarded by Portugal
Score	Country
12 points	France
10 points	Germany
8 points	Denmark
7 points	Spain
6 points	Netherlands
5 points	Sweden
4 points	Greece
3 points	Norway
2 points	United Kingdom
1 point	Ireland
