= RTP1 HD =

- Country: Portugal
- Broadcast area: Portugal
- Headquarters: Lisbon

Programming
- Picture format: 1080i (16:9) (HDTV)

Ownership
- Owner: Rádio e Televisão de Portugal
- Sister channels: RTP1; RTP2; RTP3; RTP Memória; RTP Açores; RTP Madeira; RTP África; RTP Internacional

History
- Launched: 30 September 2009
- Closed: 28 November 2017

Links
- Website: www.rtp.pt

RTP1 HD was RTP's HDTV channel. In 2008 it broadcast the 2008 Summer Olympics in HD on ZON's cable and satellite platforms as a temporary service called RTP HD, with live programming from 1am to 5pm. It is also marketed as RTP1 HD, when broadcasting RTP1 programming.

The channel closed on November 28, 2017, after the test period ended and RTP1 got a proper HD simulcast. The channel reopened for a few days after technical problems arose, but was shut down after the proper HD simulcast was able to broadcast once more.

== Programming ==
=== Sports ===
- UEFA Champions League
- Portugal national football team qualifying matches
- Volta a Portugal

=== Series ===
- Bem-Vindos a Beirais

=== Soap operas ===
- Os Nossos Dias (now)

=== Other ===
- Festival RTP da Canção
- Eurovision Song Contest
