= Suzy (singer) =

Suzy Guerra
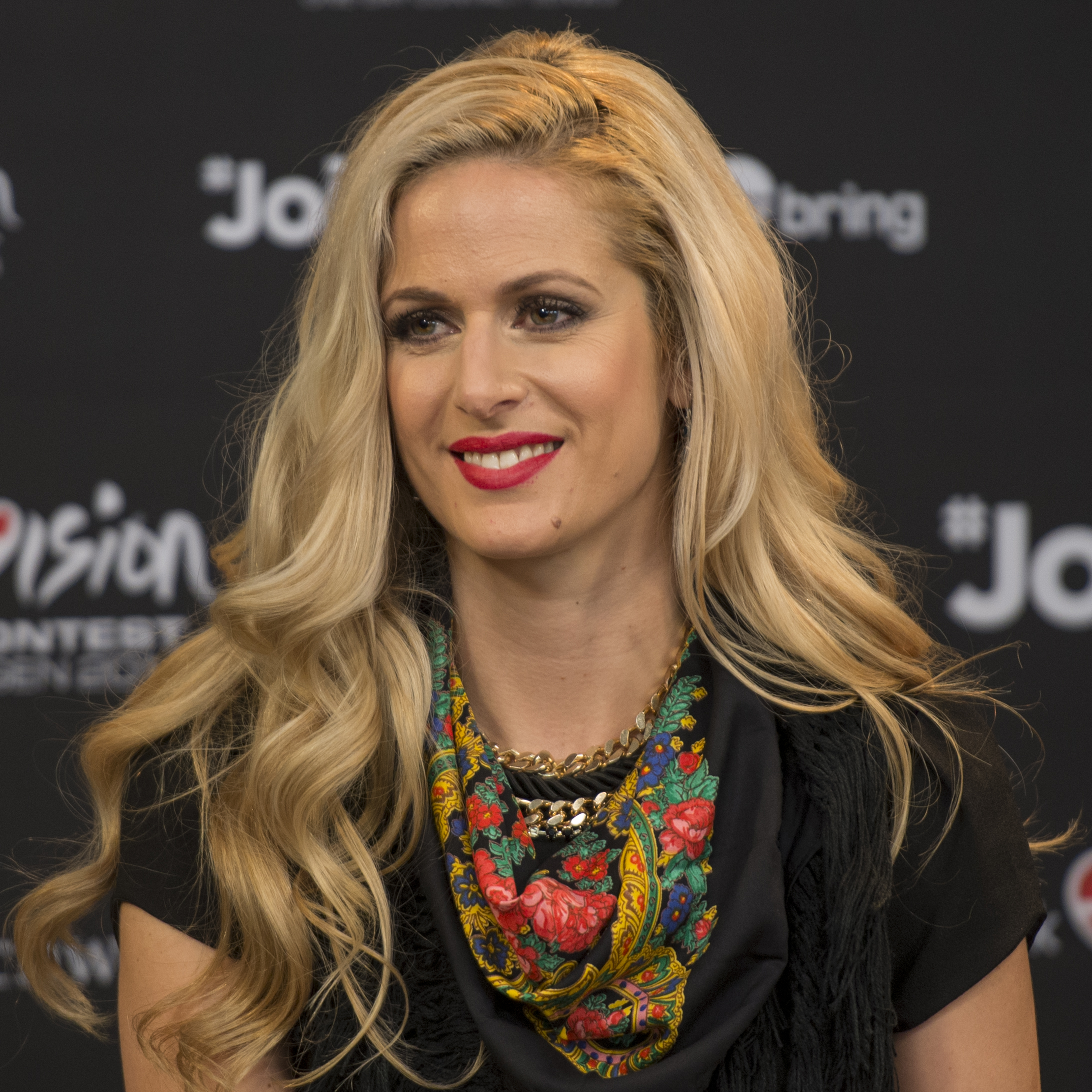
- Suzy Guerra (2014)

Background information
- Born: Susana Guerra; 24 January 1980 (age 46); Figueira da Foz, Portugal
- Genres: Pop
- Occupation: Singer
- Instrument: Vocals

Susana Guerra (born 24 January 1980), known professionally as Suzy Guerra and formerly Suzy, is a Portuguese singer. She represented Portugal in the Eurovision Song Contest 2014 in Copenhagen, Denmark with the song "Quero ser tua".

== Early life ==
Suzy was born in Figueira da Foz. From very early on she has shown great pleasure in singing, appearing for the first time on stage at only 5 years of age, at the Cineteatro Caras Direitas in Buarcos, a small village in the centre of Portugal. During her childhood, she moved to Lisbon, having joined the group Onda Choc, a kids’ band of huge success in the 90s, which allowed her to perform in numerous shows and make several appearances on TV shows. Prior to becoming a singer, Suzy worked for Emirates as a flight attendant.

== Career ==
=== 1999–2010: Early career ===
At Christmas 1999, the song which gave her greater visibility was launched: Suzy performed with the famous Portuguese duet Anjos "Nesta Noite Branca" (this white evening), a huge success and still a mandatory song in the Christmas season, playing incessantly on different Portuguese radio stations. With this song, she made countless TV shows, together with Anjos.

Suzy, still under the name Susanna, released her first solo album in 2002, where she collaborated with João Portugal. The pleasure she feels when singing led her to explore new experiences. Between 2002 and 2003, she played the role of Sally in the musical "My Fair Lady" by Filipe La Feria. After this experience, and after finishing university, she decided to travel to Canada and the United States. In December 2009 she returned to Portugal and joined the cast of the musical "Alice e a Magia do Natal" (Alice and the Magic of Christmas), produced exclusively for the "Óbidos Christmas Village" event, alongside Ricardo Soler, Helena Vieira, Luís Jardim, Bernardo Gavinha and Beatriz, Costa. In 2010, she presented the song "Candyland", in the compilation Summer Jam 2010, with which she appeared on numerous stages in several places in Portugal.

=== 2014–present: Eurovision Song Contest ===
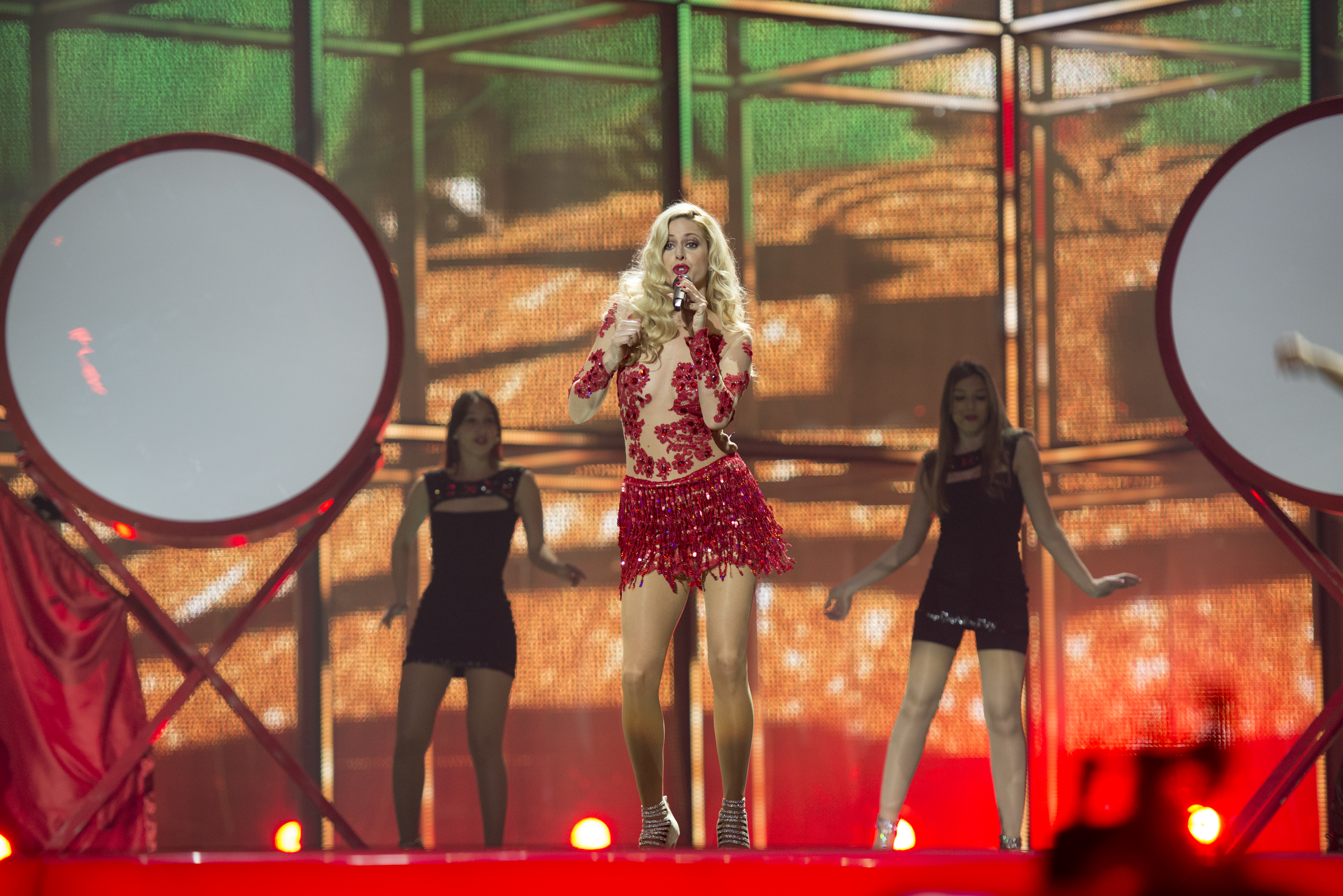
Suzy during a rehearsal before the first semi-final

In 2014, she was invited to sing at some events in Dubai, where she lived until participating in Festival da Canção 2014. Already this year she was invited by singer-songwriter and producer Emanuel to be his representative in the Festival RTP da Canção 2014, where she performed "Quero ser tua" (Lit. I want to be yours) – the show that celebrated the 50th anniversary of this event. She turned out to be winner of the night, gaining approximately 41% of the votes from the Portuguese people.

In addition to this participation, Suzy and Emanuel appeared together as "King and Queen of Carnival" in Figueira da Foz and prepared several duets, which will be included in her new CD coming out later this year. After her victory in the Festival RTP da Canção, Suzy has been approached by several television and European musical events, requesting her presence. In April she was present in the mega event in Amsterdam, "Eurovision in Concert", at the invitation of the organizers, where she performed together with other singers that were participating in Eurovision 2014.

She was the spokesperson for Portugal's votes in the Eurovision Song Contest 2015 in Vienna.

Awards and achievements
| Preceded by Filipa Sousa with Vida minha | Portugal in the Eurovision Song Contest; 2014 | Succeeded by Leonor Andrade with Há um mar que nos separa |
