= Portugal in the Eurovision Song Contest 1986 =

- Eurovision Song Contest 1986
- Participating broadcaster: Radiotelevisão Portuguesa (RTP)
- Country: Portugal
- Selection process: Festival RTP da Canção 1986
- Selection date: 22 March 1986

Competing entry
- Song: "Não sejas mau para mim"
- Artist: Dora
- Songwriters: Guilherme Inês; Zé Da Ponte; Luís Manuel de Oliveira Fernandes

Placement
- Final result: 14th, 28 points

Participation chronology

Portugal was represented at the Eurovision Song Contest 1986 with the song "Não sejas mau para mim", written by Guilherme Inês, Zé Da Ponte, and Luís Manuel de Oliveira Fernandes, and performed by Dora. The Portuguese participating broadcaster, Radiotelevisão Portuguesa (RTP), selected its entry at the Festival RTP da Canção 1986.

== Before Eurovision ==
=== Festival RTP da Canção 1986 ===
Radiotelevisão Portuguesa (RTP) held the Festival RTP da Canção 1986 at its studios in Lisbon on 22 March 1986, hosted by Henrique Mendes and Maria Helena Fialho Gouveia, who hosted the very first Portuguese national final in 1964.

Mendes and Fialho Gouveia introduced and made light commentary on the songs, which were taped in advance for the television audience. Each television region in Portugal (Ponta Delgada, Funchal, Porto, and Lisbon) submitted three songs for this year's Festival. An expert jury decided the winner, and only the placement of the top three songs were made public.

The winning entry was one of the songs from Lisbon, "Não sejas mau para mim", performed by Dora and composed by Guilherme Inês, Zé Da Ponte, and Luís Manuel de Oliveira Fernandes.

Final – 22 March 1986
R/O	Artist	Song	Place
1	Grupo Rimanço	"No vapor da madrugada"	2
2	Carlos Alberto Moniz and A Banda	"Canção para José da Lata"	—N/a
3	Luís Bettencourt	"Cais de encontro"	—N/a
4	Luís Filipe	"Tango da meia-noite"	—N/a
5	Paulo Ferraz	"Um amor, uma ilha"	—N/a
6	Sérgio Borges	"Quebrar a distância"	—N/a
7	Né Ladeiras	"Dessa juras que se fazem"	—N/a
8	Trabalhadores do Comércio	"Tigres de bengala"	2
9	Gabriela Schaaf	"Cinzas e mel"	—N/a
10	Lara Li	"Rápidamente"	—N/a
11	Dora	"Não sejas mau para mim"	1
12	Fá	"Uma balada de amor"	—N/a

== At Eurovision ==
Dora was the twentieth and last performer on the night of the contest, following Finland. At the close of the voting the song had received 28 points, placing 14th in a field of 20 competing countries. Despite its low placing, it would be the highest rank Portugal would receive in the Contest between 1985 and 1990.

=== Voting ===
Points awarded to Portugal
Score	Country
12 points	
10 points	
8 points	Spain
7 points	Israel
6 points	
5 points	
4 points	Norway; Turkey; United Kingdom
3 points	
2 points	
1 point	Denmark

Points awarded by Portugal
Score	Country
12 points	Belgium
10 points	Switzerland
8 points	Ireland
7 points	Netherlands
6 points	Luxembourg
5 points	Denmark
4 points	Germany
3 points	Spain
2 points	United Kingdom
1 point	Austria
