= Pedro Luís Neves =

Portuguese composer

Pedro Luís Neves is a Portuguese modern composer of classical music and author of several other genres.

Pedro Luís Neves works as a composer and musician within many different musical fields, some of which include theatre plays and works with fusion between contemporary classical music and other genres (so called "crossover music"), such as jazz, Rock, electronica, and more. He also has extensive experience from working as producer, and occasionally recording engineer, in many recording sessions.

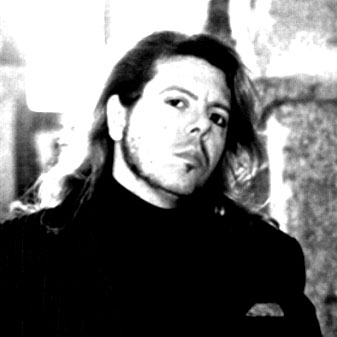

== Biography ==
Born in Lisbon, 18 May 1955, Pedro Luís Neves started his musical studies in 1965 at the Lisbon Calouste Gulbenkian Foundation. Later at the Academia dos Amadores de Música, and studied piano, harmony and composition with Maestro João de Mello Júnior. He studied biology at the University of Lisbon and formed a jazz quartet at the Hot Club of Portugal, entered the universe of improvisation and composition techniques, simultaneously collaborating in the creation of two experimental theatre shows with Lisbon's Comuna Teatro de Pesquisa and Teatro Oficina from Brazil, in Brecht's play Galileo.

He dived into Brazilian popular music with Fernando Girão, and also into the complex structures of symphonic rock with Tantra performing live at the Coliseu dos Recreios in Lisbon. He recorded in Madrid as pianist and arranger with singers Paulo de Carvalho and Carlos Mendes the albums Sheiks and some TV series. In the 80s he arranged and performed the show Ser Solidário with singer composer José Mário Branco and toured as pianist with the orchestra.

In 1982, along with female vocalist Iei-Or, he founded the pop rock band Da Vinci as composer and producer recording 15 albums and TV shows. For some years afterwards he has also produced and composed TV jingles with RTC awards.

He won the Festival RTP da Canção (RTP Song Contest) in 1989, later representing Portugal at the Eurovision Song Contest with the song Conquistador (platinum record).

Directing a band, he performed live tours in Portugal, France, Switzerland, Canada, South Africa, among other countries. He has produced and composed for artists like Brazilian singer Marisa Dwir.

Since 1995 he has essentially dedicated his time to composing modern symphonic music, creating several opus for orchestra and choir.

== Repertoire ==
- Seven Symphonic Suites (for orchestra, 1995–2005)
- The Piano Collection (10 songs for piano, 2002)
- Piano Quartets (for piano & strings, 2004)
- Spirits Octet (for violin, brass & reeds ensemble and percussion, 2005)
- Garden of Delights (3 symphonic poems for orchestra, choir and soloists, based on texts of the Vulgata, 2005–2008)

== Discography ==
With Tantra

- Holocausto (1977), EMI Valentim de Carvalho
- Humanoid Flesh (1980), EMI Valentim de Carvalho

With Sheiks

- Pintados de Fresco (1978), EMI Valentim de Carvalho
- Sheiks com Cobertura (1979), EMI Valentim de Carvalho

With José Mário Branco

- Ser Solidário (1981), EMI Valentim de Carvalho

With Da Vinci

- Lisboa Ano 10.000 (1982), PolyGram
- Hiroxima Meu Amor (1982), PolyGram – silver record
- Caminhando (1983), PolyGram/Universal
- Xau Xau de Xangai (1983), PolyGram
- Anjo Azul (1984), PolyGram
- No Meu Vídeo (1985), PolyGram
- Prince of Xanadu (1986), PolyGram
- A Jóia no Lótus (1988), Discossete – gold record
- Conquistador (1989), Discossete – 1st prize at the RTP Song Contest
- Conquistador (1989), Discossete – platinum record
- A Dança dos Planetas (1990), Discossete
- Entre o Inferno e o Paraíso (1993), PolyGram/Universal
- Oiçam (1995), Movieplay
- Momentos de Paixão (1999), CD7
