= Henrique Mendes =

Portuguese television presenter (1931–2004)

- Born: 2 January 1931; Lisbon, Portugal
- Died: 8 July 2004 (aged 73); Amadora, Portugal
- Occupation: Television Presenter
- Years active: 1950–2004
- Spouse: Glória de Matos
- Children: 1

Henrique Mendes (January 2, 1931 – July 8, 2004) was a Portuguese television presenter and actor, best known for hosting several editions of Festival da Canção.

Mendes joint Rádio Renascença in 1950 as a radio announcer and in 1958 he joint RTP and was invited to join as a television presenter by Artur Agostinho and he became known in Portugal for hosting Festival da Canção (Portuguese heats for the Eurovision Song Contest), which he hosted from 1964 until 1968, again in 1972 and again in 1986, in addition the latter also commentated on the Eurovision Song Contest for Portugal between 1965 and 1967 and again from 1969 until 1972. He also hosted a short-lived Portuguese version of Let's Make A Deal called Negócio Fechado running from 1999 to 2000 on Sociedade Independente de Comunicação.

With the success of his fame in Portugal, Mendes and his wife emigrated to Canada where he began hosting the Portuguese News in Toronto. In 1979 Mendes and his wife returned to Portugal where Raul Solnado encouraged Mendes to run as radio director of Rádio Renascença, in which Mendes was promoted to radio director and stayed in the job for almost 18 years. In 2002 he published his biography Um Homem Sorri com Palavras Leves (A Man Smiles at Light Words).

Mendes died on July 8, 2004, after suffering from bone cancer. He survived from his wife the actress Glória de Matos and his daughter from a previous marriage.
