= Júlio Isidro =

Portuguese television presenter, radio announcer and entertainer

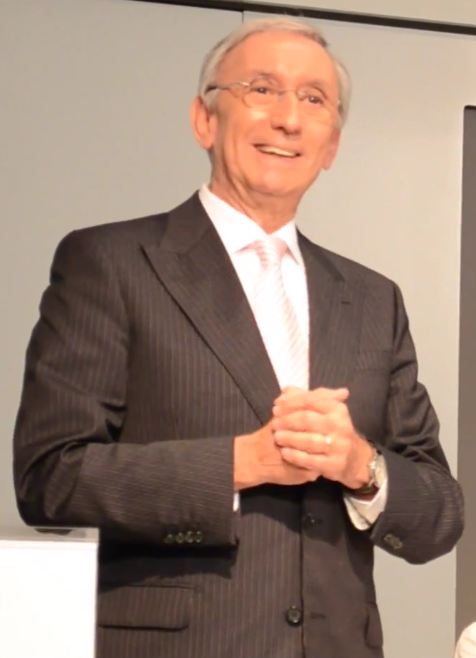
- Born: 5 January 1945 (age 81); Lisbon, Portugal
- Occupation: television presenter
- Employer: RTP
- Spouse: Sandra Barros
- Children: 3

Júlio José de Pinho Isidro do Carmo ComIH (born 5 January 1945 in Lisbon), better known as Júlio Isidro is a Portuguese television presenter, radio announcer and entertainer.

== Early career ==
When fifteen, Isidro was hired by RTP to host the daily youth programme Programa Juvenil with Lídia Franco, Isidro had appeared on the show a couple of years earlier as part of the Camões Secondary School choir. In 1968, Isidro joint Rádio Clube Português as newsreader and presenter. Together with José Barata-Moura, Isidro hosted the talent show O Fungagá da Bicharada between 1974 and 1976.

== Career ==
In 1980, Isidro hosted the Saturday Morning show Febre de Sábado de manhã which was a huge success in Portugal, he also hosted shows such as O Passeio dos Alegres, Festa é Festa e A Festa Continua. In 1985, he hosted Arroz Doce along with Eunice Muñoz and in 1986 he hosted Clube dos Amigos Disney where he inherited the nickname Uncle Júlio. Starting in 1991 he began hosting the Festival da Canção (Portuguese heats for the Eurovision Song Contest), he continued to host the semi-finals in 1992 and 1993. In 1991 he went to work for the private TV station TVI where he hosted the shows Domingo Gordo, Luzes da Ribalta and 1001 Tardes.

== Recent career ==
In 1997, he returned to RTP and began hosting the show O Amigo Público as well as being a daily presenter for RTP África. In 2000, he celebrated 40 years as a presenter for RTP. For RTP1 he hosted Tributo a e Entrada Livre, O Passeio dos Alegres - 20 Anos Depois and Praça da Alegria e Portugal no Coração. He hosted the New Year's Eve countdown along with Gato Fedorento. He is currently a host on RTP Internacional.

== Personal life ==
Isidro is married to Sandra Barros with whom he has two children; Mariana (born 1999) and Francisca (born 2002). Isidro has another daughter, Inês (born 1968), from a previous relationship.

Isidro received the Order of Prince Henry in 2000. He is a supporter of Sporting CP.
