= Nucha (singer) =

Portuguese singer

- Born: Cristina Isabel dos Santos Baldaia Trindade; 21 June 1966 (age 59)
- Origin: Águeda, Portugal
- Genres: Pop
- Occupation: Singer
- Website: Nucha

Cristina Isabel dos Santos Baldaia Trindade (born on 21 June 1966), better known as Nucha, is a Portuguese singer. She represented Portugal in the Eurovision Song Contest 1990.

== Biography ==
Nucha's first participation in Portugal's Eurovision selection, Festival da Canção, was in 1988 with the song "Se calhar", but this failed to pass the semi-final stage. She entered Festival da Canção a second time in 1990, and this time was successful with the song "Há sempre alguém" ("There's Always Someone") winning the juries' vote. "Há sempre alguém" went forward to the Eurovision Song Contest 1990, held on 5 May in Zagreb, where it did not prove popular, finishing in 20th place of the 22 entries, having received points only from the Luxembourg and United Kingdom juries. However, the song did prove to be popular in Portugal.

Nucha's first album, Tu vais ver, was released in 1992, followed two years later by the more successful Todos me querem. Four further albums followed in the 1990s; she also became a familiar face on Portuguese television with many appearances on entertainment programmes. She remained a regular on TV into the 2000s; however, her recording career was on hold for several years until the release of the album Regresso in 2007.

Nucha made a surprise return to Festival da Canção in 2009 with "Tudo está na tua mão", placing ninth.

In 2013, she entered in Big Brother VIP, where she stayed 28 days after being evicted by the public.

== Albums discography ==
- 1992: Tu vais ver
- 1994: Todos me querem
- 1996: Sedução
- 1997: Anda
- 1998: Luz
- 1999: Destino
- 2007: Regresso

Awards and achievements
| Preceded by Da Vinci with "Conquistador" | Portugal in the Eurovision Song Contest; 1990 | Succeeded by Dulce Pontes with "Lusitana paixão" |
