= Tó Cruz =

- Birth name: António José Ramos da Cruz
- Born: 9 July 1967 (age 57)
- Origin: Lisbon, Portugal
- Genres: Pop, R&B
- Occupation: Singer

Tó Cruz (born António José Ramos da Cruz; 9 July 1967 in Lisbon) is a Portuguese singer of Cape Verdean descent, best known for his participation in the 1995 Eurovision Song Contest.

== Biography ==
Cruz started out as a studio backing singer and voiceover performer for television and radio commercials. In 1995, he entered the Portuguese Eurovision selection, Festival da Canção, with the song '"Baunilha e chocolate" ("Vanilla and Chocolate"), and was the clear winner with the regional juries. "Baunilha e chocolate" went forward to the 40th Eurovision Song Contest, held on 13 May in Dublin. Cruz's performance was professional, but the song itself did not prove popular with the juries, finishing in 21st place of the 23 entries after receiving points only from France and Greece. This was Portugal's lowest Eurovision placement at the time.

Cruz provides the voice of Quasimodo in the Portuguese version of Disney's The Hunchback of Notre Dame, the singing voice of Dodger in Oliver and Company, and Garrett in Quest for Camelot. His first album, Alma nua, was released in 1998, followed two years later by Camaleão, but neither sold well. In 2001, Cruz moved to the United States, where he recorded an English-language album under the name of António TC Cruz.

Returning to Portugal, Cruz provided more voiceover work for Disney's 2007 film Enchanted and has sung with artists such as Laura Pausini, Paulo de Carvalho and Rão Kyao.

== Albums discography ==
- 1998: Alma nua
- 2000: Camaleão
- 2003: António TC Cruz

Awards and achievements
Preceded by Sara Tavares with "Chamar a música"	Portugal in the Eurovision Song Contest; 1995	Succeeded by Lúcia Moniz with "O meu coração não tem cor"
