= Tânia Ribas de Oliveira =

Portuguese television hostess (born 1976)

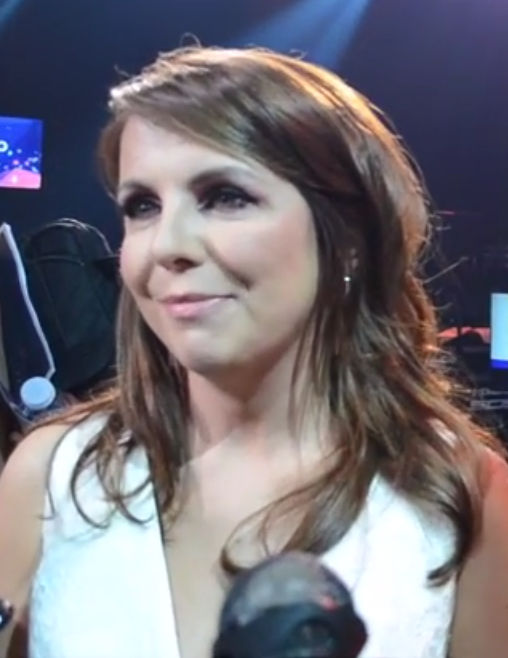
- Born: Tânia Ribas Dias de Oliveira; 18 June 1976 (age 50); São Jorge de Arroios, Lisbon, Portugal
- Education: Instituto Superior de Ciências Sociais e Políticas, Universidade Técnica de Lisboa
- Occupation: Television presenter
- Years active: 1999–present
- Employer(s): RTP (current); SportTV (former)
- Spouse: João Cardoso (m. 2009)
- Children: 2

Tânia Ribas Dias de Oliveira (born 18 June 1976) is a Portuguese television hostess.

== Early life and education ==
Tânia Ribas de Olvieira was born in the parish of São Jorge de Arroios in Lisbon on 18 June 1976, and was baptized in the Church of Our Lady of the Conception of Queluz on 16 January 1977. Her mother was a flight attendant of TAP Air Portugal.

She graduated in Labour Sociology in the Instituto Superior de Ciências Sociais e Políticas of the (then) Universidade Técnica de Lisboa.

== Career ==
Her first television work was as an outdoor reporter for Sport TV in 2000.

She was an intern in Rádio e Televisão de Portugal (RTP) in 2002 and 2003. After that she continued working for the company. Her work on RTP includes being an outdoor reporter on Bom Dia Portugal, on the broadcasts of Volta a Portugal, Operação Triunfo, Praça da Alegria and was a presenter on "Só Visto" alongside Hélder Reis, as well as other special broadcasts.

Tânia also presented the game show A Herança in the Summer of 2007. From 18 September 2006 until May 2007, she presented the daily game show Lingo being then replaced by Isabel Angelino.

She presented the daytime talk-show Portugal no Coração with João Baião from September 17, 2007 until January 2013. Then, both were moved to a role as presents of Praça da Alegria when the show's production moved to Lisbon and after João Baião moved to SIC she took on the role by herself. Oliveira also had a brief stint presenting the lottery draw show Fatura da Sorte. From September 22, 2014 until March 2019 she was one of the presenters of Agora Nós.

Since 2017, she has continuously presented one of the semi-finals of Festival da Canção.

== Personal life ==
She married João Cardoso in a Catholic religious ceremony on 25 July 2009, and the couple has two sons. She is a practising Roman Catholic. A former gymnast in the sports club, she is also a fan of Sporting Clube de Portugal.
