= Da Vinci (band) =

Portuguese band

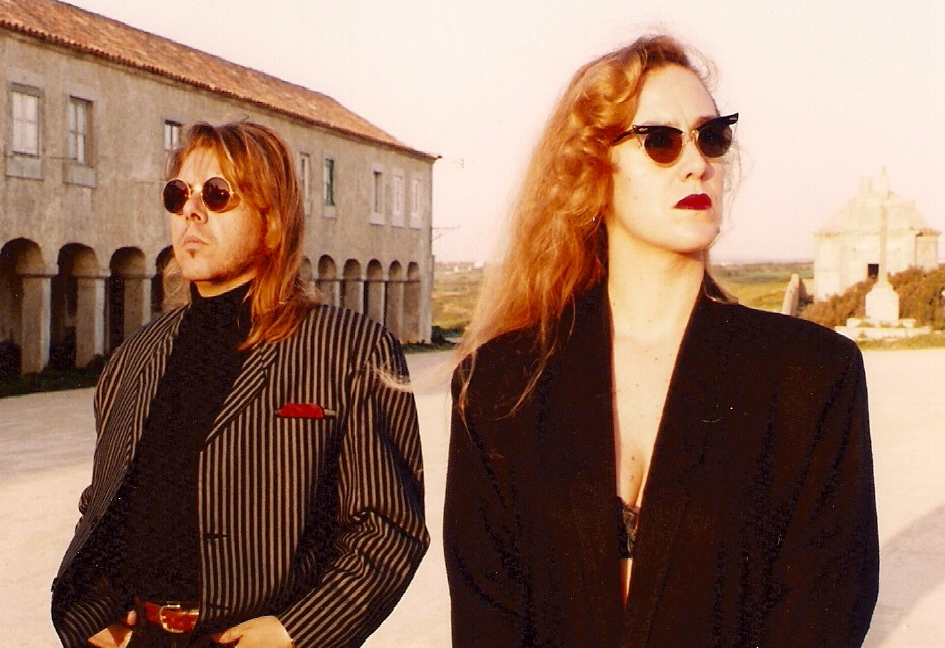
- Two members of Da Vinci at Cabo Espichel, Portugal, late 1990s

Background information
- Origin: Portugal
- Years active: 1983–present
- Members: Iei-Or and Pedro Luís
- Website: davinci.dotsi.pt

Da Vinci is a Portuguese band created by Iei-Or and Pedro Luís Neves, whose members included Ricardo, Joaquim Andrade, Dora and Sandra Fidalgo, among others throughout the years. Since Ricardo had a plane accident, he was replaced by Tó.

They represented Portugal in the Eurovision Song Contest 1989 with the song "Conquistador" and finished 16th.

Presently only the two founding members are in the band.

== History ==
2007

- Performed at the Atlântico Pavilion for 9,000 people in RTP's live broadcast of Diz que é uma espécie de Réveillon with Gato Fedorento.

1999

- Momentos de Paixão album released.

1995

- Oiçam album released.

1993

- Entre o Inferno e o Paraíso album released.

1991

- Toured Portugal and Canada.
- 1992 new year in Toronto.

1990

- Dança dos Planetas album released.
- Conquistador album goes Gold (50,000+ units sold) and Platinum (100,000+ units sold).
- Conquistador single published in several European countries.

1989

- Baby (Foi Tudo por Amor) single released.
- Conquistador album released.
- 1st prize at the 25th RTP Song Contest.
- Casa da Imprensa Mensagem TV Europa popularity prize.
- Represented Portugal with Conquistador at the Eurovision Song Contest in Lausanne, Switzerland.
- Toured mainland Portugal and islands, France, Switzerland, South Africa, and more.

1988

- A Jóia no Lótus album released.

1986

- Prince of Xanadu single released.

1985

- Momentos de Paixão single released.

1984

- Anjo Azul single released.

1983

- Caminhando album released.
- Xau Xau de Xangai single released.

1982

- Band formation.
- Fantasmas / Lisboa Ano 10.000 single released.
- Hiroxima (Meu Amor) single released, goes silver for 25,000+ units sold.

== Discography ==
- Caminhando (1983)
- A Jóia no Lótus (1988)
- Conquistador (1989)
- Dança dos Planetas (1990)
- Conquistador - Dança dos Planetas (1990)
- Entre o Inferno e o Paraíso (1993)
- Oiçam (1995)
- Momentos de Paixão (1999)

Awards and achievements
Preceded by Dora with "Voltarei"	Portugal in the Eurovision Song Contest; 1989	Succeeded by Nucha with "Há sempre alguém"
