= Mimicat =

Portuguese singer-songwriter (born 1984)

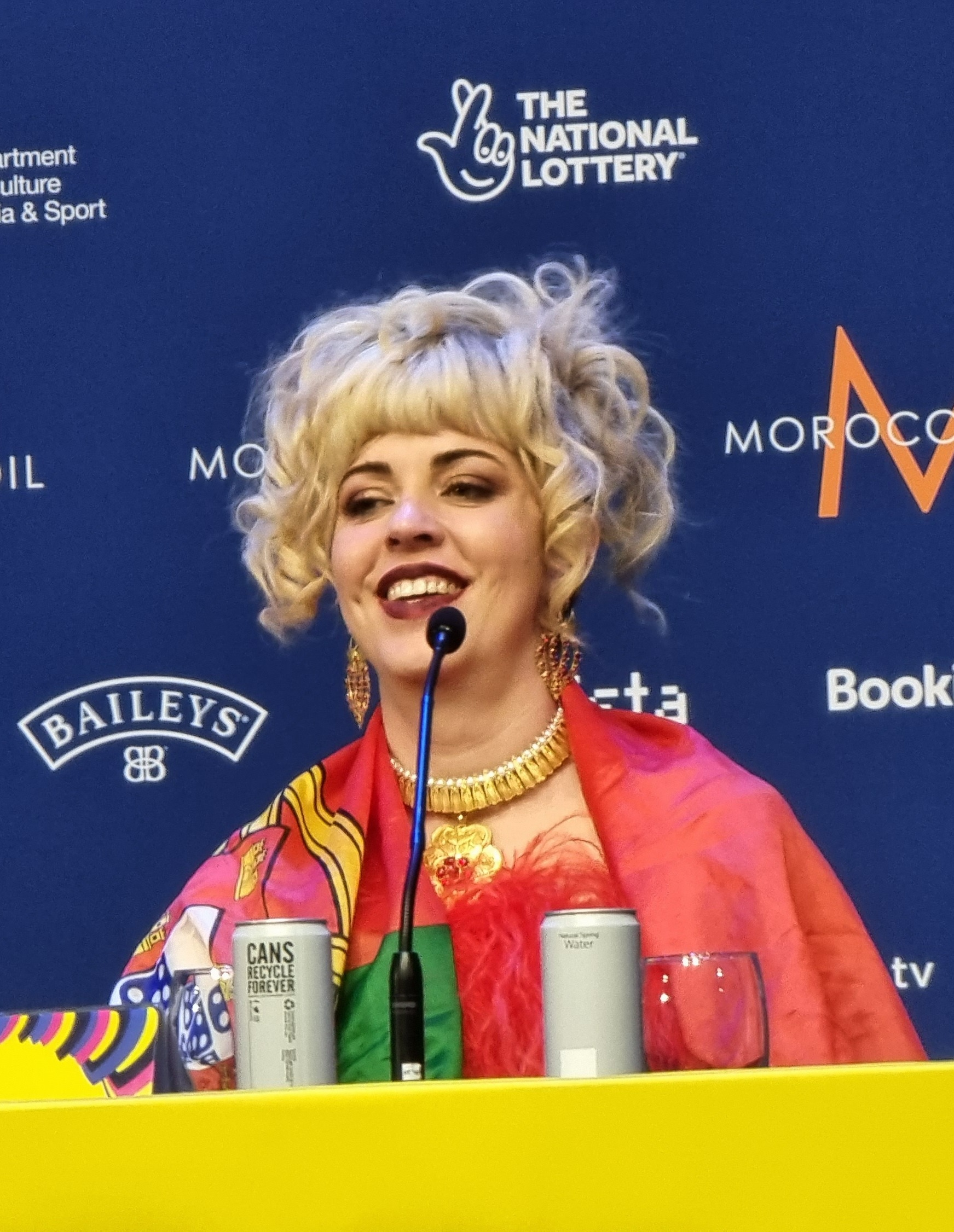
- Mimicat in 2023

Background information
- Born: Marisa Isabel Lopes Mena; 25 October 1984 (age 41); Coimbra, Portugal
- Genres: Pop; soul
- Occupations: Singer; songwriter
- Years active: 2001–present
- Label: Sony Music

Marisa Isabel Lopes Mena (Note: European Portuguese pronunciation: [mɐˈɾizɐ izɐˈβɛl ˈlɔpɨʒ ˈmenɐ]) (born 25 October 1984), known professionally as Mimicat, (Note: /ˈmiːmiːkæt/; European Portuguese pronunciation: [mimiˈkat]) is a Portuguese pop and soul singer and songwriter. She represented Portugal in the Eurovision Song Contest 2023 with the song "Ai coração". She had previously participated in Festival da Canção 2001 with the song "Mundo colorido" under the stage name Izamena, (Note: European Portuguese pronunciation: [izɐˈmenɐ]) but did not advance beyond the semi-finals.

== Music career ==
Born in Coimbra, Mimicat participated in Festival da Canção 2001 with the song "Mundo colorido" under the name Izamena, aiming to represent Portugal in the Eurovision Song Contest 2001, but did not advance beyond the semi-finals. In 2009, she graduated from Escola Superior de Artes e Design with a degree in sound and image.

In 2014, she joined the band The Casino Royal, for whom she was the lead singer and songwriter. In the same year, she released her first album as Mimicat, "For You". The lead single from the album, "Tell Me Why", was featured in the Portuguese telenovela Jardins Proibidos. Her stage name, Mimicat, is a combination of Mimi, a nickname for godmothers in her family, and Cat.

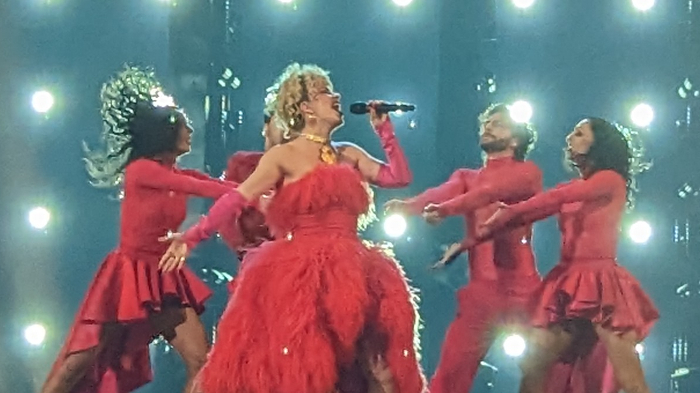
Mimicat performing at the Eurovision Song Contest 2023

She entered Festival da Canção again in 2023 with the self-composed song "Ai coração". The song won both the jury and popular vote in the contest, earning the right to represent Portugal in the Eurovision Song Contest 2023. She qualified from the first semi final for the final, in which she placed 23rd. She returned as Portugal's jury spokesperson the following year.

Mimicat has described her musical influences as including soul music, but also "pop hits on the radio". She has named Ella Fitzgerald, Ray Charles and Jill Scott as influences.

== Personal life ==
Outside of her musical career, Mimicat has worked as a real estate agent. She is married and has two children.

== Discography ==
=== Studio albums ===
Title	Details	Peak chart positions
Title	Details	POR
For You	Released: 20 October 2014; Label: Sony Music; Formats: Digital download, streaming	—
Back in Town	Released: 22 September 2017; Label: Sony Music; Formats: Digital download, streaming	43
Peito	Released: 18 September 2024; Label: Sony Music; Formats: Digital download, streaming	—
"—" denotes an album that did not chart or was not released in that territory.

=== Extended plays ===
Title	Details
25 de abril (Através de dois clássicos revisitados) (with José Calvário and Ângela Silva)	Released: 22 March 2024; Label: Rossio Music; Formats: Digital download, streaming

=== Singles ===
==== As lead artist ====
Title	Year	Peak chart positions		Album or EP
Title	Year	POR	LTU	Album or EP
"Tell Me Why"	2014	—	*	For You
"Saviour"	2015	—	*	For You
"Stay Strong"	2016	—	*	Back in Town
"Gave Me Love"	2016	—	*	Back in Town
"Fire"	2017	—	*	Back in Town
"Going Down"	2017	—	*	Back in Town
"Feels So Good"	2018	—	—	Back in Town
"Going Down"	2018	—	—	Back in Town
"Tudo ao ar"	2021	—	—	Non-album singles
"Mundo ao contrário" (with Filipe Gonçalves)	2022	—	—	Non-album singles
"Ai coração"	2023	24	34	Peito
"Vais ter saudades"	2023	—	—	Peito
"Peito"	2024	—	—	Peito
"Dança comigo"	2024	—	—	Peito
"Agora é hora" (with André Viamonte)	2024	—	—	Non-album singles
"Agostinho"	2025	—	—	Non-album singles
"Perfume de mulher" (with Ágata)	2025	—	—	50 Anos De Carreira. Ao Vivo No Casino; Do Estoril
"Santa"	2025	—	—	Non-album singles
"A minha gente"	2026	—	—	Non-album singles
"Tipicamente casados" (with Ana Bacalhau)	2026	—	—	Non-album singles
"—" denotes a recording that did not chart or was not released in that territory. " * " denotes that the chart did not exist at that time.

==== As featured artist ====
Title	Year	Album or EP
"No More" (Naked Affair featuring Mimicat)	2015	Non-album single
"Generation" (Joana Alegre featuring Mimicat)	2016	Joan & The White Harts
"Minha vida" (Lūsy featuring Mimicat)	2019	Non-album single
"Golden Days" (Zinko featuring Mimicat)	2023	Fullist
"Quase nos 40" (Gandim featuring Mimicat)	2024	Non-album singles
"Acércate" (Salvadorico featuring Mimicat)	2025	Non-album singles

=== Other appearances ===
Title	Year	Album or EP
"Aqui pintamos todos"	2024	Non-album single

== Awards and nominations ==
Year	Award	Category	Work	Result	Ref.
2023	Eurovision Awards	Style Icon	Herself	Nominated	
2026	International Portuguese Music Awards	Music Video of the Year	"Santa"	Nominated	
2026	International Portuguese Music Awards	Pop Performance	"Santa"	Nominated	

== Notes ==
Awards and achievements
Preceded by Maro with "Saudade, saudade"	Portugal in the Eurovision Song Contest; 2023	Succeeded by Iolanda with "Grito"
