= Rita Guerra =

Portuguese singer (born 1967)

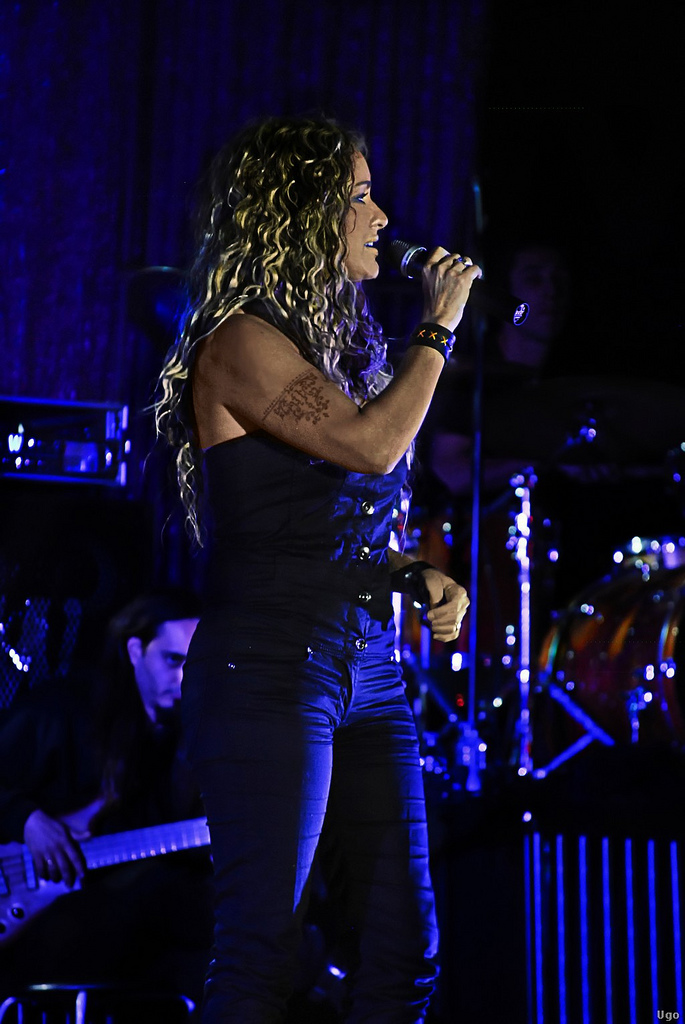

Background information
- Born: Rita Maria de Azevedo Mafra Guerra; 22 October 1967 (age 58)
- Origin: Lisbon, Portugal
- Genres: Pop, Pop rock
- Occupations: Singer, songwriter
- Years active: 1989–present

Rita Maria de Azevedo Mafra Guerra, commonly known as Rita Guerra (born 22 October 1967) is a Portuguese singer-songwriter. She represented Portugal in the Eurovision Song Contest 2003 where she sang "Deixa-me sonhar" and finished 22nd. In 2020, she won the Portuguese version of Masked Singer as the crow.

== Biography ==
Guerra was born and raised in Lisbon, Portugal. She has long competed in the Portuguese national pre-selection for the Eurovision Song Contest. She first participated in 1992, making it to the national finals with the song "Meu amor inventado em mim," reaching second place. She sang in the Eurovision Song Contest 2003, in Riga, Latvia, where she finished 22nd with 13 points. Guerra's brother died of cancer the day previous to the contest, which she found out immediately after her performance. Guerra married the lyricist and composer of the song, Paulo Martins. He was also responsible for the production of her latest album called Rita, released on 20 June 2005.

Since 1989, Guerro is a regular feature on the shows of Casino do Estoril. She was on the casino's stage for the first time with Adamo, a well known Belgian singer. "Pormenores sem a mínima importância" was her debut album, featuring Rui Veloso, a famous rock singer and composer, and the group Taxi. "Independence Day" was her second album, a CD released in 1995 sang only in English. Approaching ethnic music in the album "Da Gama", Rita Guerra got the help of maestro Pedro Osório and Paulo de Carvalho, Portuguese representative at ESC 1974. In 2000, Rita and Beto, one of the backing singers in Riga, released an album called "Desencontros".

Rita has also regularly worked in the Portuguese soundtrack of animated films such as "Hercules", "The Lion King", "Prince of Egypt", "The Little Mermaid" and others.

On 24 February 2020, she won the first ever "A Máscara", the Portuguese version of Masked Singer, as the crow.

== Discography ==
Album information
Pormenores sem a minima importância (Details without the minimum importance)
- Released:, 1992
Independence Days
- Released: 1995
Desencontros (Disagreements)
- Released: 2000
- Other: Beto
- Singles: "Brincando com o Fogo"
Canções do Século (Songs of the century)
- Released:
- Other: Helena Vieira and Lena D'Agua
Rita
- Released: 2005
- Chart positions: #1 PT
- RIAA certification: 2× Platinum
- Singles: "Chegar a Ti", "À Espera do Sol"
Rita (Special Edition)
- Released: 2006
- Singles: "Chegar a ti", "À Espera do Sol" "All Over Again (ft Ronan Keating)"

Awards and achievements
Preceded by MTM with "Só sei ser feliz assim"	Portugal in the Eurovision Song Contest; 2003	Succeeded by Sofia Vitória with "Foi magia"
