= Jorge Gabriel =

Portuguese television presenter

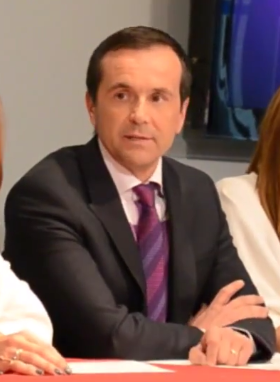
- Gabriel in 2015
- Born: Jorge Gabriel Mendes Fialho; 29 May 1968 (age 57); Lisbon, Portugal
- Occupation: Television presenter
- Years active: 1984–present
- Website: www.jorgegabriel.com.pt

Jorge Gabriel Mendes Fialho, simply referred to as Jorge Gabriel, (born 29 May 1968 in Lisbon) is a Portuguese television presenter.

The TV shows presented by him include Quem Quer Ser Milionário? (the Portuguese version of Who Wants to Be a Millionaire), Praça da Alegria, O Preço Certo em Euros (the Portuguese version of The Price Is Right), O Cofre (the Portuguese version of The Vault) and Sabe Mais do que um Miúdo de 10 Anos? (the Portuguese version of Are You Smarter Than a 5th Grader?).

He is also an occasional actor, having been on several TV series.

== Early life and career ==
Born in Lisbon, he would become known on television. However, he had begun his career in radio, with 16 years old, in RDP Antena 1, where he participated in "Musicomania," a program of Raul Durão for the youngsters. At the same time, he collaborated in Rádio Regional da Amadora. He then moved to Rádio Mais and left the Antena 1. Later he worked to the sports section of the Rádio Comercial, where he stayed more than three years, returned to Rádio Mais and collaborated in the TSF sports programs. He began his work in Sociedade Independente de Comunicação (SIC) television channel in December 1992, two months after that private television channel has started its regular broadcasts. Jorge Gabriel was accepted in the sports department of SIC after being approved in some tests. On the same year, he started to attend the Portuguese Catholic University in Lisbon, enrolling in the 1st year of the philosophy program. However, Jorge Gabriel did not graduate and pursued a career in television. He began by making a lunchtime program called "Owners of the Game" contest with questions about football that lasted one year. He also sometimes presented the "scoreboard" and the sports program "Owners of the Ball." Then in the summer of 1996, he was in charge of a contest broadcast by SIC on Sundays and named "Yes or No," through which he met great success. At the end of the summer Jorge Gabriel was highlighted by SIC to follow the 1996 Summer Olympics, in Atlanta, United States of America, where he was airing two times per day in live interventions. Jorge Gabriel became more known to the general public through the contest "Now or Never", which commanded over 39 emissions. Then became the host of "The Wheel of Millions," another popular contest of SIC. In late 2000, Jorge Gabriel also became the host of one of the highest rated shows of the TV station, the "Big Show SIC", a task previously performed by João Baião, which had left SIC to work in the Rádio e Televisão de Portugal (RTP). However, he had little time ahead of the show and, as like João Baião, Jorge Gabriel eventually moved to the RTP in early 2002, where his new task was to present "The Price is Right" and, later, the morning show "Square Joy "and" Who Wants to Be a Millionaire." In 2004, he was writing for Record, and was also the host of Soccerstars on RTP1's prime time.

As soon as he was awarded the Level 2 Football Coaching Certificate, in June 2006, Gabriel became assistant manager in a non-professional lower division of Aveiro District. As a member of the coaching staff, he then won the Portuguese 3rd Division Championship with FC Arouca in the 2007-08 football season.

== Personal life ==
Gabriel has a son from his first marriage named Duarte. He and Filipa Gameiro, his second wife, are parents of two girls, Mariana and Madalena, as well as of a boy, Pedro. In August 2023, Jorge Gabriel announced he was divorcing after 20 years of marriage with Filipa Gameiro. He is a supporter of Sporting CP, a major Portuguese sports club.
