= José Carlos Malato =

Portuguese television presenter (born 1964)

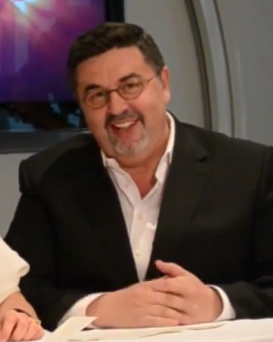
- Malato in 2015
- Born: José Carlos Malato; 7 March 1964 (age 62); Monforte, Portugal
- Occupation: Television presenter
- Years active: 1984–present

José Carlos Malato (born 7 March 1964) is a Portuguese TV presenter, radio broadcaster, copywriter and college teacher. In 2018, Malato publicly came out as gay. In 2022, they came out as non-binary.

== Television programs hosted ==
- Top+, on RTP1 with Ana Lamy.
- Portugal no Coração, on RTP1, with Merche Romero, Marta Leite de Castro and Cristina Alves.
- Um Contra Todos, on RTP1.
- A Herança, on RTP1.
- Sexta À Noite, on RTP1.
- Jogo Duplo, on RTP1.
- Decisão Final, on RTP1.
- Festival da Canção (semi-finals), on RTP1 (since 2017).
