= Sónia Araújo =

Portuguese TV hostess (born 1970)

Sónia Araujo
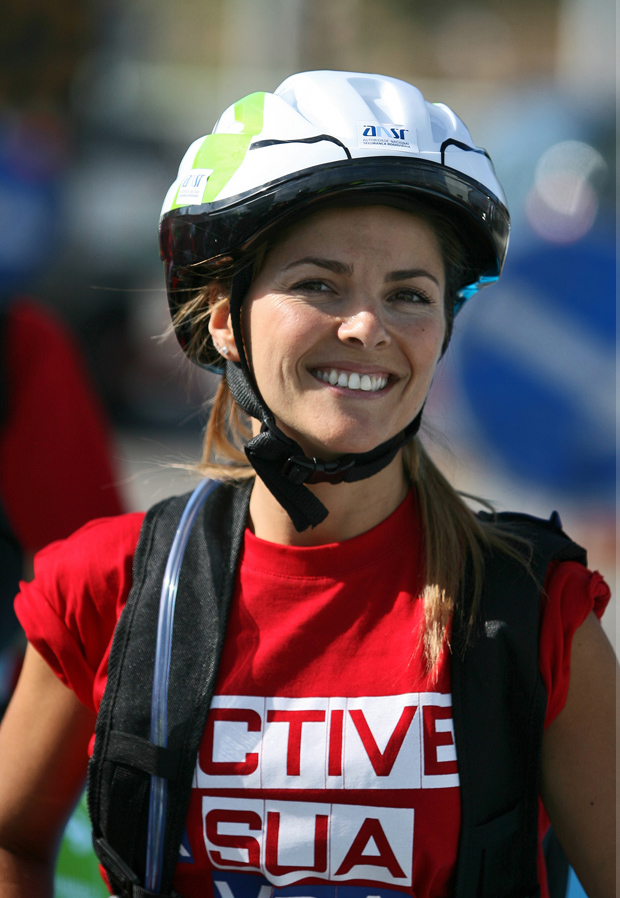
- Born: 24 November 1970 (age 55); Porto, Portugal
- Occupations: TV hostess, television presenter. dancer, actress and lawyer
- Years active: 1993-present

Sónia Araújo (born 24 November 1970) is a Portuguese TV hostess and television presenter who is known for her work in the Portuguese talk show Praça da Alegria. She participated in the 2007 edition of the Eurovision Dance Contest, in which she won the fifth place.

== Career ==
Her career in broadcasting began in 1993, when she first appeared in the magic show Isto é Magia (Portuguese for This is Magic) by the magician Luis de Matos. She participated in several other programs (1,2,3, Chuva de Estrelas, Avós e Netos, to name a few) until she achieved recognition in Portugal by co-presenting Praça da Alegria in 1996, which she still hosts to this date, despite a short interruption while participating in the Eurovision Dance Show in 2007. A year later, she graduated in law at the Lusíada University of Porto and has stated that even if she doesn't become a lawyer, her knowledge might be of use to her.
