= Dora (singer) =

Portuguese singer

Dora Maria Reis Dias de Jesus (born 20 May 1966 in Lisbon) is a Portuguese singer.

She represented Portugal twice at the Eurovision Song Contest. In 1986 she placed 14th with the song "Não sejas mau para mim" and in 1988, she placed 18th with "Voltarei". She later represented Portugal in the OTI Festival 1990 with the song "Quero acordar".

In February 2013 at the age of 46 she posed nude for Playboy Portugal in a photoshoot by Ana Dias.

Awards and achievements
Preceded by Adelaide Ferreira with "Penso em ti, eu sei"	Portugal in the Eurovision Song Contest; 1986	Succeeded by Nevada with "Neste barco à vela"
Preceded by Nevada with "Neste barco à vela"	Portugal in the Eurovision Song Contest; 1988	Succeeded by Da Vinci with "Conquistador"
Preceded by Marco Paulo with "Rosa morena"	Portugal in the OTI Festival; 1990	Succeeded by Dulce Pontes with "Ao sul da América"
