= Filipa Sousa =

- Born: March 2, 1985 (age 41); Albufeira, Portugal
- Genres: Pop
- Occupation: Singer
- Years active: 2003–present
- Formerly of: Al-Mouraria
- Website: www.filipasousa.com

Filipa Sousa (born 2 March 1985) is a Portuguese singer. She represented Portugal at the Eurovision Song Contest 2012 in Baku, Azerbaijan with the song "Vida minha".

Sousa debuted in 2003, as a member of the Portuguese group, Al-Mouraria. In the same year, she auditioned for the second edition of Operação Triunfo, reaching the 30 finalist but not qualifying for the last 15. It was in 2007, that she once again auditioned for Operação Triunfo reaching the final 15, and received recognition for the public. In 2008 she won the 'Grande Noite de Fado' held in Algarve.
