= Banda Calypso discography =

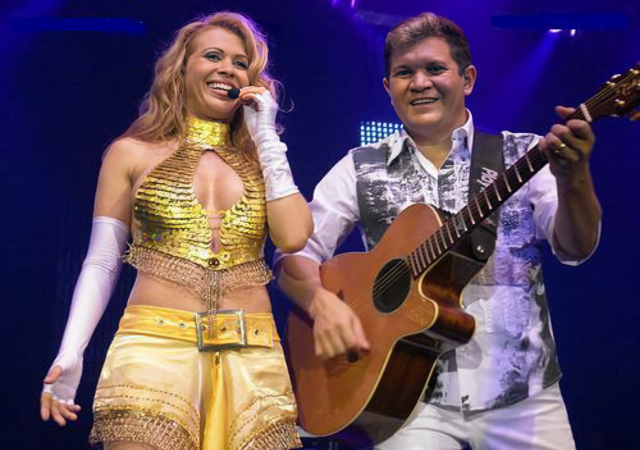
- Joelma and Chimbinha in a concert in 2006.
- Studio albums: 13
- Soundtrack albums: 7
- Live albums: 10
- Compilation albums: 8
- Singles: 23
- Video albums: 8
- Music videos: 10

The discography of Banda Calypso comprises twenty albums in a fifteen-year career, divided into twelve studio albums, eight live albums and four promotional albums with five collections. Even without the presence of a major label the band has remained among the biggest sellers in the country, selling more than 16 million CDs and more than 5 million DVDs. In all, the band's CDs have received 14 gold, 10 diamonds, 13 platinum and 13 double platinum. In addition, the band has had two Latin Grammy nominations. They have sold more CDs in the 2000s than any other Brazilian band and are currently the largest sellers of DVDs in Brazil.

Among the highlights of the band's discography are albums Banda Calypso, Volume 8 which sold over 1.8 Million copies, becoming the best-selling album in Brazilian music history, the album Banda Calypso, Live in Brazil which won the Diamond Quintuple certificate, the only band to have won this award, and the album Banda Calypso, Live in Angola. The latter contains the track The Sound of Africa , a duet in honor of Angola with the participation of Angolan singer Anselmo Ralph. The DVD Calypso by Brazil was 24 weeks on the bestseller list of Brazil.

== Albums ==
Year	Album details	Sales
1999	Volume 1: Release: 1999; Label(s): Calypso Produções; Format(s): CD, digital download, LP	750,000+
2002	Ao Vivo: Release: 2001; Label(s):Sony, Calypso Produções; Format(s): CD, digital download	1,200,000+
2002	O Ritmo Que Conquistou o Brasil!: Release: 2002; Label(s): Calypso Produções; Format(s): CD, digital download	1,000,000+
2003	Volume 4: Release: 2003; Label(s): Calypso Produções; Format(s): CD, digital download	1,000,000+
2004	Ao Vivo São Paulo: Release: 2004; Label(s): Calypso Produções; Format(s): CD, DVD, digital download	CD: 500,000+ DVD: 700,000+
2004	Volume 6: Release: 2004; Label(s): Calypso Produções; Format(s): CD, digital download	1,000,000+
2005	Na Amazônia: Release: 2005; Label(s): Calypso Produções; Format(s): CD, DVD, digital download	CD:500,000+ DVD:1,000,000+
2005	Volume 8: Release: 2005; Label(s): Calypso Produções; Format(s): CD, digital download	1. 800.000+
2006	Pelo Brasil: Release: 2006; Label(s): Calypso Produções; Format(s): CD, DVD, digital download	CD: 1.000.000+ DVD: 2.500.000+
2007	10: Release: 2007; Label(s): Calypso Produções; Format(s): CD, digital download	1,000,000+
2007	Live in Goiânia: Release: 2007; Label(s): Calypso Produções; Format(s): CD, DVD, digital download	CD: 200.000+ DVD: 500.000+
2008	Acústico: Release: 2008; Label(s): Som Livre; Format(s): CD, digital download	250,000+
2009	Amor Sem Fim: Release: 2009; Label(s): Calypso Produções; Format(s): CD, digital download	500,000
2010	10 Anos: Release: 2010; Label(s): Som Livre; Format(s): CD, DVD, digital download	CD1:60.000 CD2:80.000 DVD:250.000
2010	Vem Balançar!: Release: 2010; Label(s): Calypso Produções; Format(s): CD, digital download	300,000+
2010	Ao Vivo em Recife: Release: 2010; Label(s): Calypso Produções; Format(s): CD, digital download	150,000+
2011	Meu Encanto: Release: 2011; Label(s): som Livre; Format(s): CD, digital download	95,000+
2012	Ao Vivo em Angola: Release: 2012; Label(s): Radar Records; Format(s): CD, DVD, digital download	CD: 20.000+ DVD: 60.000+
2012	Eternos Namorados: Release: 2012; Label(s): Radar Records; Format(s): CD, digital download	50,000+
2013	Eu Me Rendo: Release: 2013; Label(s): Radar Records; Format(s): CD, digital download	20,000+
2013	Ao Vivo no Distrito Federal: Release: 2013; Label(s): Radar Records; Format(s): CD, DVD, digital download	CD: 30.000+ DVD: 60.000+
2014	Vibrações: Release: 2014; Label(s): Calypso Produções; Format(s): CD, digital download	10,000+
2015	15 Years: Release: 2015; Label(s): Radar Records; Format(s): CD, DVD, digital download	CD1: 25.000+ CD2: 25.000+ DVD: 50.000+

== Collections ==
Year	Album details	Sales
2003	Os Maiores Sucessos: Release: 2003; Label(s): Calypso Produções; Format(s): CD	
2005	20 Super Sucessos: Release: 2005; Label(s): Calypso Produções; Format(s): CD	
2006	As 20 +: Release: 2006; Label(s): Calypso Produções; Format(s): CD,	
2007	100% Calypso: Release: 2007; Label(s): Som Livre; Format(s): CD, DVD	
2013	O Melhor da Banda Calypso: Release: 2013; Label(s): Radar Records; Format(s): CD, DVD	

== Promotional albums ==
Year	Album details	Sales
2009	Banda Calypso Hipercard: Release: 2009; Label(s): Calypso Produções; Format(s): CD	
2009	Ao Vivo em Caruaru: Release: 2009; Label(s): Calypso Produções; Format(s): CD, DVD	
2012	Folia: Release: 2012; Label(s): Calypso Produções; Format(s): CD	

== Tours ==
- 1999: Tour Live
- 2003: Tour Live in São Paulo
- 2004: Tour in Amazônia
- 2006: Tour at Brazil
- 2007: Tour Accelerated!
- 2009: Tour 10 Years
- 2010: Tour Vem Balançar!
- 2011: Tour Angola
- 2014: Tour A Festa Começou
- 2015: Tour 15 Years

== Appearances ==
Year	Music	Artist	Album
2005	Por Que Choras?	Bruno & Marrone	Meu Presente é Você
2005	Refém da Solidão	Amor Perfeito	Amor Perfeito Vol. 02
2005	Conte a Verdade	Amor Perfeito	Amor Perfeito Vol. 02
2005	De Coração para Coração	As Leoas	Marcas de Batom
2007	Pássaros Noturnos	Zé ramalho	Parcerias de Viajantes
2008	Venha Arrochando	Nara Costa	Pensando em Você
2008	Agora Chora	Aviões do Forró	Aviões do Forró volume 6
2008	Propostas Indecentes	Latino	Junto e Misturado
2008	Vida(Ao Vivo)	Amor Perfeito	Amor Perfeito Ao Vivo em Belém
2009	Beija Flor	Kim Marques	
2010	Tudo Bem	Labatida	
2010	Chorando se Foi (llorando se fue)	Nando Reis	Bailão do Ruivão
2007	Corpo, Alma e Coração	Adilson Ramos	

In addition to these holdings, Banda Calypso also invited several artists to do duets, like: Another Chance (Leonardo), gum with Calypso (Gum with Banana), Sweet Honey (Edu & Maraial), Sunday to Sunday (Maraial), No Direction (Fagner), a New Being (Voice of Truth), nor Yes, No no (Bruno e Marrone), I can not deny that Te Amo (Reginaldo Rossi), who loves does not stop loving (Amado Batista).

=== Soundtracks ===
Ano	Music	Film/Series/Novel/Program
2007	Tô Carente	Filme: Ó Paí, Ó
2009	Accelerated My Heart Pra me conquistar	Filme: Cupid's Arrow; Filme Jean Charles
2011 – presente	Entre Tapas e Beijos	Série: Tapas & Beijos
2011 – presente	Príncipe Encantado	Série: Tapas & Beijos
2012	Balancê	Programa: O Melhor do Brasil
2012	Sem Direção	Novela: Cheias de Charme
2012	Lelezinha	Reality Show: A Fazenda
2012	Quem Ama Não Deixa De Amar	Novela: Balacobaco
2012	Me Beija Agora	Novela: Guerra dos Sexos
2012 – presente	Me Beija Agora	Série: Tapas & Beijos

=== Videoclips ===
Year	Music	Direction
2004	Imagino	Flávio Goldemberg
2002	Dançando Calypso	Joelma, Chimbinha
2002	Cúmbia do Amor	Joelma, Chimbinha
2003	Anjo	Joelma, Chimbinha
2005	Isso é Calypso	Flávio Goldemberg, Andrea Rebelo
2006	Pará Belém	Nelson Mendes, Cassiano Ricardo
2006	Pelo Brasil	Christian Valente
2007	Nessa Balada	Christian Valente
2010	Com Você Onde Sua Vida For	Chimbinha, Joelma e Hipercard
2011	Agradeço Esse Amor	Chimbinha, Joelma e Ricardo Santos
2011	Meu Encanto	Ricardo Cassiano e Ricardo Santos
2011	Não Posso Negar Que Te Amo	Ricardo Cassiano e Ricardo Santos
2012	O Que é Que Adianta?	Ricardo Cassiano e Ricardo Santos
2013	Me Beija Agora	Caco Souza
2013	Perdiste el Trono	Caco Souza
