= Banda Calypso na Amazônia =

Na Amazônia

Live album by Banda Calypso
- Released: February 2005
- Recorded: November 14, 2004
- Venues: Centro de Convenções, Manaus, Amazonas
- Genres: brega pop; cumbia; carimbó; merengue; lambada
- Length: 58:30 min
- Language: Portuguese
- Label: Calypso Produções
- Directors: Chimbinha; Dedê
- Producer: Chimbinha

Banda Calypso chronology
Volume 6 (2004)	Na Amazônia (2005)	Volume 8 (2005)

Na Amazônia (In the Amazon in English) is the third live album by Brazilian group Banda Calypso, which was released on February 2005, by Calypso Produções. The concert was recorded on November 14, 2004, in Sambódromo of Manaus, in Manaus, Amazonas. The album selling over 500,000 units in the Brazil.

== Track listing ==
No.	Title	Writer(s)	Length
1.	"Abertura "Calypso na Amazônia""	Joelma; Tovinho	02:13
2.	"Pra Te Esquecer"	Batista Lima	04:15
3.	"Nenê"	Edú Luppa	03:23
4.	"Anjo"	Louro Santos	03:32
5.	"Primeiro Amor"	Kim Marques	03:42
6.	"Disse Adeus"	Chimbinha; Tonny Brasil	04:11
7.	"Tic Tac"	Edú Luppa	03:32
8.	"Dois Corações"	Tonny Brasil	03:26
9.	"Imagino"	Chrystian Lima; Ivo Lima	03:57
10.	"Lágrimas de Sangue"	Tonny Brasil	02:27
11.	"Love You Mon Amour"	Tonny Brasil	03:44
12.	"Lambada Complicada"	Aldo Sena	02:59
13.	"Homem Perfeito"	Carla Maués; Gaitan Ricardo Alberto; Gaitan Ricardo Alfredo; Tovar Nicolas R.	04:21
14.	"Pot-Pourri de Carimbó: Canto de Carimbó / Lua Luar / Canto de Atravessar"	Vital Lima; Nilson Chaves; Manoel Cordeiro; Mestre Lucindo; Márcio Montoril; Pimentel	04:50
15.	"Fala Pra Mim"	Louro Santos; Tinho	03:41
16.	"Brincou Comigo"	Kim Marques; Chimbinha	02:48
17.	"Paquera"	Marquinhos Maraial; Beto Cajú	03:44
18.	"Solos do Chimbinha"	Chimbinha	01:48

== Charts ==
Chart	Peak position
Brazil (PMB)	1
