= Os Maiores Sucessos =

Compilation album by Banda Calypso
- Released: July 2003
- Genres: brega pop; cumbia; lambada; zouk
- Producer: Chimbinha

Banda Calypso chronology
Os Maiores Sucessos	Os 20 Super Sucessos

Os Maiores Sucessos (English: The Greatest Hits) is the first greatest hits album by Brazilian group Banda Calypso, released in July 2003. The album contains all of the group's hits from their first three albums, Banda Calypso (1999), Ao Vivo (2002), and O Ritmo Que Conquistou o Brasil! (2002), as well as two newly recorded songs, "Mil e Uma Noites" and "Sem Medo de Falar". The album sold over 400,000 units in the Brazil.

== Tracks ==
1. "Dançando Calypso"
2. "Príncipe Encantando"
3. "Estrela Dourada"
4. "Odalisca"
5. "Vendaval"
6. "Cúmbia do Amor"
7. "Esperando por Você"
8. "Dudu"
9. "Só Vai Dar Eu e Você"
10. "Senhorita"
11. "Sem Medo de Falar"
12. "Mil e Uma Noites"
13. "Fórmula Mágica"
14. "Maridos e Esposas"
15. "Como Uma Virgem"
16. "Disse Adeus"
