= Vendaval (song) =

Single by Banda Calypso

from the album Volume 1
- Released: 1999
- Recorded: 1998–1999
- Genre: Brega
- Length: 2:59
- Label: Calypso Produções
- Songwriter(s): Adilson Ribeiro; Bruno Rafael
- Producer(s): Chimbinha

Banda Calypso singles chronology
"First"	"Vendaval"	"Disse Adeus"

"Vendaval" (Gale in English) is a song by Brazilian brega pop band Banda Calypso, recorded for their 1999 debut album Volume 1. It was their first single.

== Commercial performance ==
The song did not have a national impact; however, it had a large impact in Belém and cities in the Northeast of Brazil.

The music was present in the top 3 compilations of the band, Os 20 Super Sucessos, Os Maiores Sucessos, and As 20+. It also achieved considerable success in 2001 when it was re-recorded by the band Calcinha Preta in their CD volume 7, Seu Coração vai A´render o que é Paixão.

According to band members Joelma and Chimbinha, fans request many old songs, such as Vendaval, for new shows. On tour, in Sweden, the band did not take the music repertoire and made a simple presentation without choreography or effects, simply Joelma and the public.
