= Rock doido =

- Stylistic origins: Tecnobrega; brega; funk; axé; forró; reggaeton; carimbó
- Cultural origins: Late 2000s, Belém, Pará, Brazil
- Typical instruments: Synthesizer; sequencer; sampler; mixer; large-scale sound systems (aparelhagem)

Rock doido (lit. 'crazy rock') is a Brazilian musical genre that emerged in the outskirts of Belém, Pará, as a sped-up offshoot of tecnobrega in the late 2000s. It is characterized by fast electronic beats, usually close to 180 beats per minute, achieved by speeding up songs from genres such as funk, axé, forró, and reggaeton, combined with original compositions produced at the same tempo. The name, which bears no relation to rock music, also refers to the peak moment of aparelhagem parties — traditional popular events in Pará that bring together large sound systems, stage structures, light panels, and pyrotechnics — and, by extension, to the events themselves held in this format.

== History ==
Rock doido has its roots in tecnobrega, an electronic genre that emerged in Belém in the late 1990s from the fusion of traditional brega, carimbó, lambada, and calypso, driven by the use of synthesizers, sequencers, and samplers to reduce production costs. This genre organized itself around the aparelhagens — large sound-system crews — and in the 2000s became nationally popular through artists such as Gaby Amarantos.

In the late 2000s, traditional brega bands — whose structure consisted of two vocalists and two dancing couples, playing mostly love songs — shifted to a structure centered on just one DJ and one singer, with a repertoire aimed at the equipes, groups of fans from the outskirts organized to attend parties together. This transition is associated with the creation of eletromelody by producers Maderito and Joe Benassi. Around that time, tecnofunk also emerged, a mix of tecnobrega and funk carioca. These two musical genres paved the way for the emergence of rock doido, when producers began incorporating forró, axé, and reggaeton as well, all sped up to around 180 beats per minute.

Throughout the 2010s and early 2020s, rock doido ceased to be confined to neighborhood parties and began to occupy more high-profile venues in Belém, such as the Mangueirão stadium, in addition to being incorporated into the repertoire of nationally famous artists such as Alok, Nattan, and Wesley Safadão. The genre's popularization intensified in 2025 with the holding of the 2025 United Nations Climate Change Conference and the release of the album Rock Doido, by Gaby Amarantos, which was voted Best Album of the Year by the 2025 APCA Award.
