= Volume 8 (Banda Calypso album) =

Studio album by Banda Calypso
- Released: October 2005
- Recorded: June 2005
- Genres: brega pop; cumbia; lambada; merengue; forró
- Length: 54:04 min
- Language: Portuguese
- Labels: Calypso Produções; MD Music
- Producer: Chimbinha

Banda Calypso chronology
Na Amazônia (2005)	Volume 8 (2005)	Pelo Brasil (2006)

Singles from Volume 8
- 1. "Isso é Calypso" Released: October 2005; 2. "Tchau Pra Você" Released: January 2006; 3. "Pra Me Conquistar" Released: May 2006; 4. "Esqueça Meu Coração" Released: July 23, 2006; 5. "No Bate Papo" Released: August 5, 2006

Volume 8 is the eighth studio album by Brazilian group Banda Calypso, released in October 2005 through the record label independet Calypso Productions. It was the biggest-selling album of the band to date and has many successes. Its impact on the media was very strong. The album features songs from hits like "Isso é Calypso", "Tchau Pra Você" and "Pra Me Conquistar". The album was named Best Portuguese Language Roots Album at the 7th Latin Grammy Awards. The album reached number one in Brazil and selling over 1,000,000 units.

== Track listing ==
No.	Title	Length
1.	"Tchau Pra Você"	03:20
2.	"Tô Carente"	03:14
3.	"Passe de Mágica"	03:34
4.	"No Bate Papo"	02:59
5.	"Ouvindo o Rádio"	03:13
6.	"Pra Me Conquistar"	02:57
7.	"Nem Sim, Nem Não"	04:00
8.	"Mistura de Amor"	03:29
9.	"Não, Não"	03:34
10.	"Isso é Calypso"	02:54
11.	"Luz Do Coração (Deixa Vibrar)"	02:56
12.	"Esqueça Meu Coração"	03:24
13.	"Faço Tudo Por Você"	04:15
14.	"Perdeu o Trono"	03:56
15.	"Sua Fantasia"	03:23
16.	"No Coração de Uma Mulher"	03:14
17.	"Um Novo Ser"	03:51

== Charts ==
Chart	Peak position
Brazil (PMB)	1
