= 20 Supersucessos =

20 Super Sucessos
- Cover 20 Super Sucessos (20 Super Hits)

Compilation album by Banda Calypso
- Released: January 4, 2005
- Genres: brega pop; cumbia; lambada; zouk; carimbó
- Language: Portuguese
- Label: Calypso Produções
- Producer: Chimbinha

Banda Calypso chronology
Os Maiores Sucessos	20 Super Sucessos	As 20 +

20 Supersucessos (English: 20 Super Hits) is a compilation album from Banda Calypso released in 2005, recalling the achievements of his first 3 albums.

== Track listing ==
1. Príncipe Encantado
2. Chamo Por Você
3. Me Telefona
4. Love You Mon'Amour
5. Fórmula Mágica
6. Desfaz As Malas
7. Estrela Dourada
8. Odalisca
9. Como Uma Virgem
10. Senhorita
11. Solidão
12. Amor Nas Estrelas
13. Dois Corações
14. Disse Adeus
15. Sem Você
16. Zouk Love
17. Tia Mariquinha / Vai Buscar A Flor
18. Só Vai Dar Eu E Você
19. Dudu
20. Cúmbia do Amor
