= O Ritmo Que Conquistou o Brasil! =

O Ritmo Que Conquistou O Brasil!

Studio album by Banda Calypso
- Released: December 2002
- Recorded: January 2002
- Genres: brega pop; cumbia; lambada; zouk; carimbó
- Length: 55 min
- Language: Portuguese
- Label: Calypso Produções
- Producers: Chimbinha; Dedê

Banda Calypso chronology
Ao Vivo (2002)	O Ritmo Que Conquistou O Brasil! (2002)	Volume 4 (2003)

Singles from O Ritmo Que Conquistou o Brasil!
- 1. "Chamo Por Você" Released: 2002; 2. "Temporal" Released: 2003; 3. "Me Telefona" Released: 2002; 4. "Príncipe Encantado" Released: 2003

O Ritmo Que Conquistou o Brasil! (English: The Rhythm That Captivated Brazil!) is the second studio album by Brazilian group Banda Calypso, released in December 2002, through the record label independet Calypso Productions. The album selling over 700,000 units in the Brazil.

== Track listing ==
No.	Title	Writer(s)	Producer(s)	Length
1.	"Chamo Por Você"	Alberto Moreno	Chimbinha; Dedê	03:45
2.	"Temporal"	Chrystian Lima	Chimbinha; Dedê	03:28
3.	"Príncipe Encantado"	Marquinhos Maraial	Chimbinha; Dedê	03:46
4.	"Me Telefona"	Márcio Flay	Chimbinha; Dedê	03:18
5.	"Cheiro do Pará"	Flávio Santana Correia Lima Neto	Chimbinha; Dedê	02:39
6.	"Esperando Por Você"	Tonny Brasil	Chimbinha; Dedê	04:13
7.	"Só vai Dar Eu e Você"	Beto Barbosa	Chimbinha; Dedê	03:04
8.	"Pot-pourri: Warilow / Te Quero / Feitiço"	Ronery, Manoel Cordeiro	Chimbinha; Dedê	03:51
9.	"Love You Mon Amour"	Tonny Brasil	Chimbinha; Dedê	02:09
10.	"Fórmula Mágica"	Tonny Brasil	Chimbinha; Dedê	03:46
11.	"Maridos e Esposas"	Christian Lima; Ivo Lima	Chimbinha; Dedê	04:17
12.	"Não faz Sentido"	Tonny Brasil	Chimbinha; Dedê	03:19
13.	"Zouk Love"	Beto Barbosa	Chimbinha; Dedê	03:46
14.	"Pot-Pourri de Carimbó: Tia Mariquinha / Vai Buscar a Flor"	Kim Marques	Chimbinha; Dedê	03:49
15.	"Desfaz as Malas"	Brizola	Chimbinha; Dedê	02:59
16.	"Conto de Fadas"	Gino Liver	Chimbinha; Dedê	02:56
