= Ao Vivo (Banda Calypso album) =

Ao Vivo Live

Live album by Banda Calypso
- Released: March 2002
- Recorded: October 18, 2000
- Venues: in the Lamb's Exhibition Park, Recife, Pernambuco
- Genres: brega pop; cumbia; lambada; zouk; carimbó
- Length: 57:28
- Label: Calypso Produções
- Producer: Chimbinha

Banda Calypso chronology
Banda Calypso (1999)	Ao Vivo; Live (2002)	O Ritmo Que Conquistou o Brasil! (2002)

Singles from Ao Vivo
- 1. "Dançando Calypso" Released: 2001; 2. "Cúmbia do Amor" Released: 2001; 3. "Dudu" Released: 2001; 4. "Estrela Dourada" Released: 2001; 5. "Odalisca" Released: 2001; 6. "Gringo Lindo" Released: 2001; 7. "Choro Por Você" Released: 2001; 8. "Como Uma Virgem" Released: 2001

Ao Vivo (Live in English) is first live album by Brazilian group Banda Calypso, which was released in March 2002, by Sony Music Brazil. The album was recorded during a concert at the on October 18, 2000, in the Lamb's Exhibition Park in Recife. On this album are hits from his debut album, like "Dançando Calypso", "Anjo do Prazer", "Disse Adeus" (which was the first song of the disclosed band in town ), among others. This album marks the exit of the band Belém, Pará to Brazilian Northeast. Ao Vivo was certified Gold by the Pro-Música Brasil (PMB) and selling over 750,000 copies and established the band on the national music scene.

== Track listing ==
1st edition

No.	Title	Length
1.	"Abertura"	01:52
2.	"Dançando Calypso"	03:09
3.	"Deusa da Paixão"	03:47
4.	"Solidão"	03:36
5.	"Cúmbia do Amor"	04:00
6.	"Loirinha"	03:40
7.	"Senhorita"	04:09
8.	"Lambada Complicada"	02:10
9.	"Dudu"	03:59
10.	"Amor nas Estrelas"	03:47
11.	"Anjo do Prazer"	03:51
12.	"Estrela Dourada"	04:06
13.	"Odalisca"	03:18
14.	"Gringo Lindo"	04:04
15.	"Pot-pourri de Carimbó I"	03:01
16.	"Pot-pourri de Carimbó II"	03:55
17.	"Choro Por Você"	03:05
18.	"Dois Corações"	03:21
19.	"Disse Adeus"	04:08
20.	"Como Uma Virgem"	04:10

2nd edition

No.	Title	Length
1.	"Abertura"	01:52
2.	"Dançando Calypso"	03:09
3.	"Deusa da Paixão"	03:47
4.	"Solidão"	03:36
5.	"Cúmbia do Amor"	04:00
6.	"Senhorita"	04:09
7.	"Lambada Complicada"	02:10
8.	"Dudu"	03:59
9.	"Amor nas Estrelas"	03:47
10.	"Anjo do Prazer"	03:51
11.	"Estrela Dourada"	04:06
12.	"Odalisca"	03:18
13.	"Gringo Lindo"	04:04
14.	"Choro Por Você"	03:05
15.	"Dois Corações"	03:21
16.	"Disse Adeus"	04:08
17.	"Como Uma Virgem"	04:10

== Certifications ==
Region	Certification	Certified units/sales
Brazil (Pro-Música Brasil)	Gold	750,000
