= Pinduca =

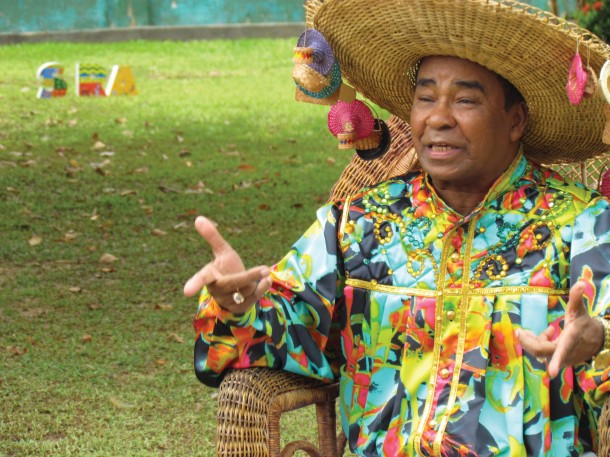

Background information
- Born: Aurino Quirino Gonçalves; June 4, 1937 (age 89); Igarapé-Miri, Pará, Brazil
- Genres: Carimbó
- Occupation: Singer · songwriter · instrumentalist

Aurino Quirino Gonçalves (born June 4, 1937), better known by the stage name Pinduca, is a Brazilian singer and songwriter, one of the main representatives of the carimbó genre, typical of Pará. His music is distinct from the traditional carimbó pau e corda, and is marked by influences from other rhythms from the Caribbean, Central America and the Guianas, countries bordering or close to the North of Brazil. These influences are reflected both in his compositions and in his "Caribbean" attire, with Pinduca often performing with a large hat, similar to a sombrero, adorned with small tropical ornaments.

== Biography, career and style ==
Pinduca was born in Igarapé-Miri, in the state of Pará. He comes from a family of musicians. He began his career at the age of 14 as a pandeiro player. At the age of 16, he moved to Abaetetuba where he joined the Orquestra Brasil. He then went to Belém, where he joined the Orlando Pereira Orchestra as a drummer, at that time considered one of the best drummers in Pará. He enlisted in the Army and pursued a career in the Military Police of Pará until he became Lieutenant Master of the Military Police Music Band. Pinduca formed his own band in 1957 and his first album was recorded in 1973 and sold 15,000 copies.

One of his inspirations is Luiz Gonzaga, the artist who made baião a national success. Influenced by Jovem Guarda and Caribbean music, Pinduca introduces electric instruments (electric guitar, bass guitar and keyboard) and drums into carimbó, leading to his style being called carimbó estilizado ("stylized carimbó"). On his fifth album, No Embalo do Carimbó e Sirimbó Vol. 5 (1976), the song "Lambada" became the first phonographic recording of the lambada genre. He also creates a musical rhythm mixing carimbó and siriá, called sirimbó.

In 2014, he was promoted to Commander of the Order of Cultural Merit, due to his contributions to Brazilian culture. In 2017, his album No Embalo do Pinduca was nominated for the 2017 Latin Grammy Awards for Best Brazilian Roots Album. In 2025, his works were declared as Intangible Cultural Heritage of the State of Pará.

== Discography ==
=== Studio albums ===
- 1973 – Carimbó e sirimbó do Pinduca
- 1974 – Carimbó e sirimbó no embalo do Pinduca v.2
- 1974 – Carimbó e sirimbó no embalo do Pinduca v.3
- 1975 – Carimbó e sirimbó no embalo do Pinduca v.4
- 1976 – Pinduca no embalo do carimbó e sirimbó v.5
- 1977 – Pinduca no embalo do carimbó e sirimbó v.6
- 1978 – Pinduca no embalo do carimbó e sirimbó v.7
- 1979 – Pinduca no embalo do carimbó e sirimbó v.8
- 1980 – Pinduca no embalo do carimbó e sirimbó v.9
- 1981 – Pinduca no embalo do carimbó e sirimbó v.10
- 1982 – Pinduca v.11
- 1983 – Pinduca O Rei do Carimbó v.12
- 1984 – Pinduca o Rei do Carimbó v.13
- 1985 – Pinduca o Rei do Carimbó, Eu Faço o Show
- 1986 – Pinduca v.15
- 1987 – Pinduca O Criador da Lambada
- 1988 – Pinduca Apresenta Kizomba
- 1989 – Pinduca Na Onda do Surubá
- 1993 – Pinduca Na Explosão Do Carimbó (BMG)
- 1997 – Pinduca Na base do Xengo Xengo
- 2003 – Pinduca Sempre
- 2005 – Pinduca: ao Vivo
- 2007 – Pinduca 40 anos de Sucesso
- 2009 – Pinduca Vol.33
