= Banda Calypso Ao Vivo em São Paulo =

Ao vivo em São Paulo Live in São Paulo

Live album by Banda Calypso
- Released: November 29, 2003
- Recorded: August 27, 2003
- Venues: in the Shows House Patativa, São Paulo, Brazil
- Genres: brega pop; cumbia; lambada; zouk
- Length: 1:23:03 (DVD)
- Language: Portuguese
- Label: Calypso Produções
- Producer: Chimbinha

Banda Calypso chronology
Volume 4 (2003)	Ao vivo em São Paulo; Live in São Paulo (2003)	Volume 6 (2004)

Ao Vivo em São Paulo (Live in São Paulo in English) is the second live album by Brazilian group Banda Calypso, which was released on November 2003, by Calypso Produções. It was recorded in São Paulo on August 27, 2003, in the shows house Patativa, to an audience of over 30,000 people, this meets the hits of the first 3 albums the band. The album selling over 500,000 units in the Brazil.

== Track listing ==
=== CD ===
No.	Title	Length
1.	"Abertura"	02:02
2.	"Temporal"	02:49
3.	"Chamo Por Você"	03:51
4.	"Me Telefona"	03:10
5.	"Príncipe Encantado"	03:47
6.	"Dançando Calypso"	03:08
7.	"Deusa da Paixão"	03:44
8.	"Solidão"	03:34
9.	"Não Faz Sentido"	03:43
10.	"Desfaz as Malas"	03:29
11.	"Maridos e Esposas"	04:19
12.	"Como Uma Virgem"	05:08
13.	"Fórmula Mágica"	03:51
14.	"Choro Por Você"	03:10
15.	"Esperando Por Você"	03:50
16.	"Cúmbia do Amor"	02:48
17.	"Dudu"	03:52
18.	"Cheiro do Pará"	02:39
19.	"Sem Medo de Falar"	02:58
20.	"Odalisca / Gringo Lindo / Vendaval"	07:54

=== DVD ===
No.	Title	Length
1.	"Abertura"	02:02
2.	"Temporal"	02:49
3.	"Chamo Por Você"	03:51
4.	"Me Telefona"	03:10
5.	"Príncipe Encantado"	03:47
6.	"Dançando Calypso"	03:08
7.	"Deusa da Paixão"	03:44
8.	"Solidão"	03:34
9.	"Não Faz Sentido"	03:43
10.	"Amor Nas Estrelas / Anjo do Prazer / Estrela Dourada"	6:18
11.	"Mil e Uma Noites"	03:16
12.	"Desfaz as Malas"	03:29
13.	"Maridos e Esposas"	04:19
14.	"Como Uma Virgem"	05:08
15.	"Fórmula Mágica"	03:51
16.	"Choro Por Você"	03:10
17.	"Esperando Por Você"	03:50
18.	"Cúmbia do Amor"	02:48
19.	"Dudu"	03:52
20.	"Cheiro do Pará"	02:39
21.	"Sem Medo de Falar"	02:58
22.	"Odalisca / Gringo Lindo / Vendaval"	07:54
Total length:		1:23:03
