= Lambadão cuiabano =

Brazilian style of music and dance

- Stylistic origins: Lambada; Rasqueado
- Cultural origins: Early 1990s, Cuiabá, Mato Grosso, Brazil

Lambadão cuiabano (Portuguese pronunciation: [lɐ̃ˈbadɐ̃w kujɐˈbɐnu]) or simply lambadão, is a style of music and dance characteristic of the Mato Grosso region of Baixada Cuiabana, especially in the municipalities of Cuiabá and Várzea Grande, in Brazil. It is a fast rhythm, characteristic of the periphery, which suffers from prejudice, especially against the more sexualized versions of the dance. Swinging and fast-paced, the rhythm is usually accompanied by romantic or playful lyrics. Despite still being blocked outside the periphery, it has already been incorporated into the local culture.

The lambadão arrived in Mato Grosso through the prospectors from Pará who brought the lambada. According to Brazilian music researcher Dewis Caldas, it is a synthesis of lambada from Pará with the heritage of rasqueado. The genre had its first "boom" in the 90s, when rasqueado bands began to dedicate themselves to it almost exclusively and created a busy market for concerts in the peripheral neighborhoods. In 2009, the First Festival of Lambadão of Cuiabá was promoted.
