= Volume 6 (Banda Calypso album) =

Studio album by Banda Calypso
- Released: October 16, 2004
- Recorded: August 2004
- Genre: Brega pop
- Language: Portuguese
- Label: Calypso Produções
- Producer: Chimbinha

Banda Calypso chronology
Ao Vivo em São Paulo (2004)	Volume 6 (2004)	Na Amazônia (2005)

Singles from Volume 6
- 1. "A Lua Me Traiu" Released: 2004; 2. "Pra Todo Mundo Ver" Released: 2004; 3. "Se Quebrou" Released: 2005; 4. "Tudo de Novo" Released: 2005; 5. "Ainda Te Amo" Released: 2005

Volume 6 is the sixth studio album by the Brazilian group of the same name, released in 2004 through the record label independet Calypso Productions. The album features a very sentimental content with many romantic ballads and does not have danceable rhythms like Cumbia or Merengue, but it does not miss the dance musicality ever brought. The album is one of the classics of the band until today that is "A Lua Me Traiu", and some highlights like the songs "Ainda Te Amo", "Pra Todo Mundo Ver", and the song "Minha Princesa" which was dedicated to Yasmin who was born shortly before the signal for album burning music brings her crying before the last chorus. The album selling over 1 million in the Brazil.

== Track listing ==
1. "A Lua Me Traiu" - 3:55
2. "Se Quebrou" - 3:31
3. "Pra Todo Mundo Ver" - 3:38
4. "Você Me Enganou" - 3:21
5. "Lágrimas de Amor" - 3:12
6. "Ainda Te Amo" - 3:28
7. "Beija-Flor" - 3:22
8. "Anjo Bandido" - 3:39
9. "Tudo de Novo" - 3:25
10. "Fora de Controle" - 4:07
11. "Minha Princesa" - 4:13
12. "Deixa Eu Sonhar" - 3:47
13. "Bye, Bye, My Love" - 4:21

== Charts ==
Chart (2006)	Peak position
Associação Brasileira dos Produtores de Discos	5
