= Banda Calypso =

Brazilian brega pop band

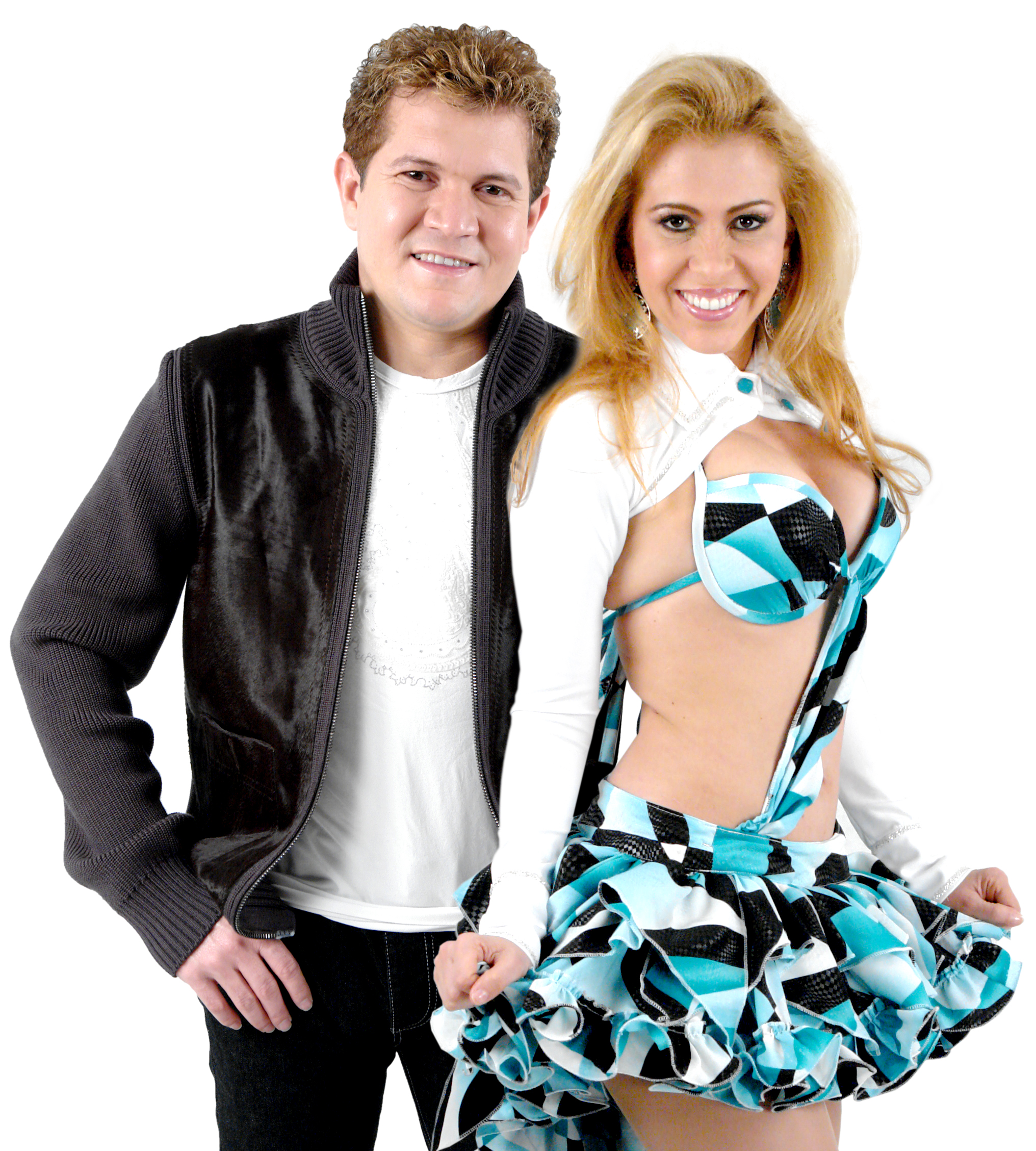
- Joelma and Ximbinha, leaders of Banda Calypso

Background information
- Also known as: Calypso
- Origin: Belém, Pará, Brazil
- Genres: Brega; cumbia; lambada; zouk; merengtheue; carimbó
- Years active: 1999–2015
- Labels: Calypso Produções; Sony Music; Som Livre; Radar Records
- Past members: Joelma Mendes; Ximbinha
- Website: www.bandacalypso.com.br

Banda Calypso was a Brazilian brega pop band, with influences of regional rhythms of the state of Pará. The band was formed in Belém, the state capital, in 1999 by singer/dancer Joelma da Silva Mendes and guitarist/producer Cledivan Almeida Farias, better known as Mestre Ximbinha. Early exposure of their work was restricted to only the North and Northeast regions of Brazil. The band now enjoys success throughout Brazil and has begun to establish its career abroad with tours to the United States, Europe and Angola.

Despite initial resistance by music distributors because of its genre and origins, the band became a leader in CD and DVD sales in the 2000s, with over 10 million albums, and over 5 million DVDs distributed in Brazil, making it one of the record-breaking bands of the country in sales. The band plays an engaging rhythm known as Brega pop and Calypso. Banda Calypso also plays a mixture of several Pará rhythms as well as Cumbia, Merengtheue and Carimbó.

In 2011, development began on the feature film This is Calypso – The Movie, which will recount how Joelma and Ximbinha met, the band's formation in 1999 and its recognition in Brazil and abroad. The film is being directed by Caco Souza and will star Deborah Secco as Joelma; the actor who will play Ximbinha has not yet been named.

On 19 August 2015 the couple announced their separation. The announcement stated that the band would honor its current commitments until the end of its performance calendar in December 2015.

== Biographies ==
Cledivan Almeida Farias, better known as Chimbinha and today as Ximbinha, was born in Pará. He began playing the flute at age 12. He reinvented the rhythm 'Brega pop'. At just 18 he was already among the best known of Belém music producers.

Joelma da Silva Mendes was born in Almeirim in Pará. She began singing at the age of 19 in local nightclubs. She became well-known after singing at the Art and Culture Fair of the city. She sang for six years in the band Fazendo Arte, until she decided to record her first solo CD. At a dinner at the home of Pará singer Kim Marques, Joelma met Ximbinha. Known for his arrangements, he agreed to produce her solo album under the stage name Joelma Lins.

The singer and the guitarist began dating and decided to come together to form the band. Initially, they expected to sell ten thousand disks, which was then considered a success. Thirteen years after the release of their first album, Banda Calypso had surpassed 14 million albums sold.

== History of the band ==
=== 1999–2001: First years ===
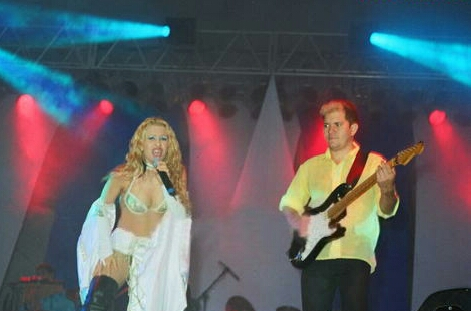
The Banda Calypso performing in 2003

The band was created in 1999 with the transformation of the solo album Joelma into Banda Calypso, Volume 1. The beginning of the band was difficult because, even with many contacts and the influence that Ximbinha exerted in the Pará music scene, music producers were reluctant to sponsor the CD of this new band. Therefore, Ximbinha put together a partnership that cut a limited edition of 1000 discs, which sold out within one week. Today many fans consider it a collector's item. With this result, Ximbinha obtained contracts for concerts and the band played throughout Pará.

Though limited in exposure to the Northern and Northeast regions of Brazil, the re-released disc surpassed 750,000 in sales. The only change made in the re-release was the introduction of three bonus tracks: 'Loirinha', 'Rubi' and 'Brega Fo'. In the song 'Loirinha', there is another singer, Dinho. Nowadays, this is the version found for sales and to download the album. With the success of the single 'Vendaval' in Belém, the band's songs became known throughout the Northeast. When they played concerts in the region they were very successful, especially with the songs 'Dois Corações' and 'Disse Adeus'.

After the single 'Vendaval' along with other songs were published in an album and distributed in the Northeast, the band played several concerts in the region that featured the singer, Dinho, in addition to starring Joelma. Among many shows, a special in Recife, capital of the State of Pernambuco, gave rise to a second album, Banda Calypso Live that was recorded in the Lamb's Exhibition Park in Recife in 2000 and released in 2001. With this recording there was a great increase in the band's exposure in the Northeast and in other Brazilian regions. The album sold over 1.2 million copies and established Banda Calypso on the national scene.

The disc was released without edits and included the tracks 'Loirinha' and two sets of carimbó, both sung by Dinho. The singer was on stage when Joelma was changing dance costumes, thus lending continuity to the show. The concert was hosted by Gilberto Barros, better known as Lion, who presented the program. In this show, and with the release of the album, the band displayed their work to a wider audience and earned a reputation in parts of the country where they had not yet had the opportunity to play in concert.

After the release of the album Live, in 2002 the band recorded its third album titled The Rhythm That Won Brazil!. The songs that were most prominent in this collection, where they played with several bands, were the ballads Maridos e Esposas and Desfaz as Malas. But the dancing hits were of greatest importance, among them Temporal, Só Vai Dar Eu e Você and Zouk Love (these songs were performed by singer Dinho and composed by singer Beto Barbosa), Príncipe Encantado and Chamo Por Você. In 2003 the band went back to Recife to attend the 1ª Festa do São João da Capitá, which was broadcast by TV network Rede Globo. With songs from all three albums having been released, the audience participated by dancing and singing in the show from beginning to end.

The band recorded their fourth album: Banda Calypso, Volume 4, which was completed in less than a week, with lead single Pra Te Esquecer, and the ballads Imagino and Tic Tac, among others. This album also contained a variety of rhythms that the band always uses, but now with more experimentation, better sound quality and a wider audience. Unlike previous albums, singing with Joelma was not Dinho but Edu Luppa, a songwriter partner who sang tracks Uma Rosa and Maria.

When the album was released it was pirated by a group in Pará, so Joelma and Ximbinha filed a lawsuit; but despite this problem they still released the disc which surpassed 900,000 copies in sales.

Also in 2003 they recorded and released their first DVD of a show in São Paulo at the venue Patativa, with an audience of more than 30,000. The show was released on CD and DVD with the title Banda Calypso Ao Vivo em São Paulo (Banda Calypso Live in São Paulo). This project received considerable attention nationally, and though recorded as a single house show the disk had sales of over 700,000 and DVD sales of over 600,000.

=== 2004–2005: Volume 6 and Na Amazônia ===
In November 2004 the band released the CD Banda Calypso, Volume 6. This album featured sentimental content with many ballads, and did not have rhythms like Cumbia or Merengue but did not lose the danceable rhythms that had been the hallmark of the band previously. The disk is considered one of the classics of the band and features the song highlights: A Lua Me Traiu, Ainda Te Amo, Pra Todo Mundo Ver and Minha Princesa. The latter was dedicated to Yasmin, the daughter of Joelma and Ximbinha, who was born shortly before the recording and who cries just before the last refrain. While promoting the album, at a show in Goiânia the heel of Joelma's shoe broke during a dance routine and she fell heavily to the stage floor, hit her head and became unconscious.

Even though two previous albums had been recently released, Volume 6 was among the 10 best selling albums for several weeks in various regions of the country, with more than 950,000 copies sold at the end of 2005, thus receiving Gold, Platinum, Diamond and Double Diamond status.

Continuing to tour under contracts arranged in 2004, the band recorded their second DVD called Calypso na Amazônia (Calypso in the Amazon [Region]). The show was held on November 14, 2004 at the Convention Center of the Amazon in Manaus with more than 50,000 in attendance. One show was a tribute to singer Gilberto Barros who had helped the band when he presented them as a preview in his live show where, when he saw the audience reaction, he could not contain his tears.

The show was also a reminder of Joelma's time in the band 'Fazendo Arte' (Making Art) reprising Brincou Comigo, a song she had sung alongside Kim Marques. The show ended with the song Paquera, which gave the presentation a simple but emotional ending. The DVD became the best seller of the year, even before being released nationwide, and earned the Triple Diamond. Its lead single was Pra Te Esquecer, which was an even greater success than its original release. But the entire disc was an extraordinary success, with highlights from dance songs to romantic ballads.

The band began its first international tour at the beginning of 2005, playing in the USA, Italy, Portugal and Sweden. When they returned to Brazil they were invited for the first time to be the guests of the TV show Domingão do Faustão on the TV network Rede Globo. Later in the year The band had four albums in the top 50 bestseller list in Brazil, and two DVDs in the top 20 list.

=== 2005–2006: Volume 8 and Pelo Brasil ===
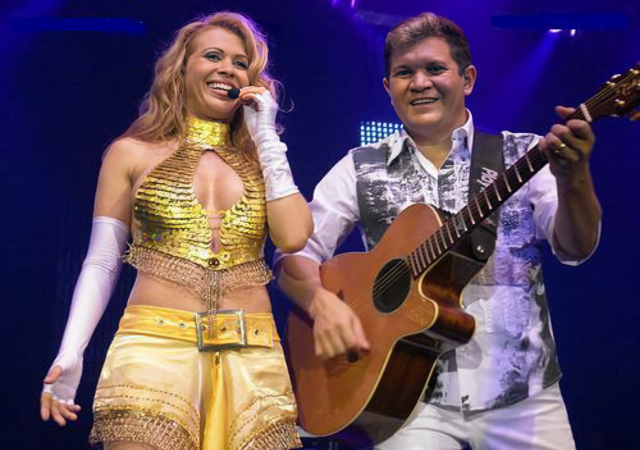
The Banda Calypso performing on March 2006

The band launched Banda Calypso, Volume 8 in October, 2005, with 17 new songs. It was the best selling album of the band to date with a total of 1,800,000 copies in Brazil alone, and its impact on the Brazilian music media was very strong. Entered in the Latin Grammy Awards, Volume 8 competed in the category, 'Best Album of Brazilian Regional Music' which singer Elba Ramalho won. One song from this album, Tô Carente, was included on the soundtrack of the film Ó Paí, O (Father, Oh Father) (2007) starring Lázaro Ramos.

In 2006 the band returned with several new projects, after the release of Banda Calypso, Volume 8 and they produced their third DVD. This DVD was a compilation of a tour of five Brazilian cities: Brasília, Rio de Janeiro, Recife, Salvador and Belém. The band then issued another CD collection, The 20+4, which was a reissue of their previous compilation, Greatest Hits, with four additional songs, Pra Te Esquecer, Imagino, Fala Pra Mim and Paquera.

On August 5, 2006 the band closed the show's fifth and final show of the tour, Calypso Pelo Brasil (Brazil by Calypso) in Belém. The next day the band played the State Gym Geraldo José de Almeida (Ibirapuera Gymnasium) with a charity show 'Child Hope' and there introduced the song This is Calypso. In September 2006 they launched the DVD Calypso Pelo Brasil (Brazil by Calypso), which has sold more than 1 million copies, the best selling DVD in the history of Brazilian music. After the release of this DVD the band played in New York City on Brazilian Day, along with other leading names of Brazilian music like Sandy and Junior, Leonardo and Babado Novo, in a street presentation to more than 1.2 million people.

=== 2007–2008: Volume 10, Ao Vivo em Goiânia and Acústico ===
After 6 months of the release of Pelo Brasil, in 2007 the band released their tenth album Volume 10 with the participation of Leonardo and Bell Marques, vocalist Ciclete com Banana, the disc is also a composite by Paulo Ricardo song called Eclipse Total.

The band continued bringing their musical diversity, among them the mixture of Axe and Calipso the song Chiclete com Calypso which includes the participation of Bell Marques vocalist Chiclete com Banana, a light mixture of country in the song Mais uma Chance which includes the participation of the singer Leonardo, and one taken from Tecnobrega in the song Nessa Balada.

In less than two weeks in the shop windows the album had already sold 500 000 copies and many times the album was among the top 10 best-selling albums. After a year and a half of the release of Volume 10, by December 2008 the album was among the top sellers in Japan 10 albums, where the band is a success to date, in the same list had names like Nelly Furtado, Madonna, Rihanna and Leona Lewis. In total the album sold over 900 000 copies. The band was invited to participate in the song Pássaros Noturnos on the album Encontro de Viajantes Zé Ramalho.

At the end of 2007 was recorded and released the CD / DVD Ao Vivo em Goiânia. The show consisted of 16 new songs and only 4 hits album Volume 10 were placed in the repertory show. The album was highlighted by the most romantic songs stood out among them 'Muito Além do Prazer' and 'Doce Mel' with the participation of the duo of composers, Maraial & Edu (Edu Luppa and Marquinhos Maraial).

In the show the band back a different way than they had done before, a show with 80% of its original content, with only four songs from the album Volume 10 thing the band managed to make a danceable and romantic to show the public Goiás. The first single Arrepiou was not as successful as expected, its most prominent were the ballads, Muito Além do Prazer, Doce Mel who had good repercussion in radios, but their dance songs as Balanço do Norte and Feita Pra Te Amar performed well also. The bandage disc was not high as the previous albums, but went great yielding bandages.

In 2007, the Calypso band and the double Zeze di Camargo & Luciano were cited as the most listened artists in the country. In 2008 Calypso Band participated Studio Coke Zero, with the band Paralamas do Sucesso, presenting a show that mixed the styles calypso and rock.

In 2008 is released an acoustic album where the band wanted to explore new audiences and start a new phase, this album was titled Acústico, which featured new songs and re-recordings of hits. This album brings together the biggest hits of the band until 2009 and rewrites them in rhythm ballads, besides having 6 totally unreleased songs: 'Paixão Machucada'; 'Máquina do Tempo'; 'As Horas Teiman'; 'Eu Sonhei'; 'Lembro de Você' and 'Gritar de Amor'. The album also comes with special price with personalized cover and disc. Was certified as a gold record in 2008.

In addition to the projects in the Brazil had international projects, touring the USA the band recorded the song Acelerou in English which was entitled 'Accelerated My Heart'. The band was chosen by the Angolan public to participate in the project of Friendship Day Angola Brazil, in partnership with Rede Globo the band played a show in Luanda, City of Angola for 40 000 people, where Angolans showed performers and had the band headlining the show had social and political intentions of signing the friendship between both countries.

On 23 November 2008 the band was flying from Teresina to Recife on a private Beechcraft Super King Air registration PT-OSR. The aircraft crashed 5 km (3.1 mi) N on final approach to Recife when both engines quit possibly because of fuel starvation and carried out a forced landing in a residential area. Two occupants, the pilot and the producer, out of 10 on board died.

=== 2009–2010: Amor Sem Fim, 10 Years and Vem Balançar! ===
In February the band was invited to participate in the Pernambuco Carnival, dragging about 2 million people in the largest carnival group in the world, Galo da Madrugada.

In 2009, on Mother's Hipercard becomes the official sponsor of the band. Joelma and Ximbinha received on October 26, 2009, in a ceremony at Legislative Assembly of the State of Pernambuco Title Citizens Pernambucans granted by State Representative Nelson Pereira PCdoB.

In 2009, the band released Amor Sem Fim, which was full of musical influences, and with the participation of Edu & Maraial, David Assayag & Edilson Santana and Yasmin, daughter of Joelma and Ximbinha, the disc back music gospel, 'Jesus Me Abraçou', a song in honor of the Amazon, Chama Guerreira 'with the participation of David Assayag & Edilson Santana, and a song that recounts the dialogue between mother and daughter Luz de Deus 'in which the couple's daughter duets, including their first single Vida Minha, which was present in several state, regional and national charts. On this album the band moves away from the beat calypso and going to other rhythms like cumbia, carimbó, Lambada, and also their romantic ballads that are never out your disks.

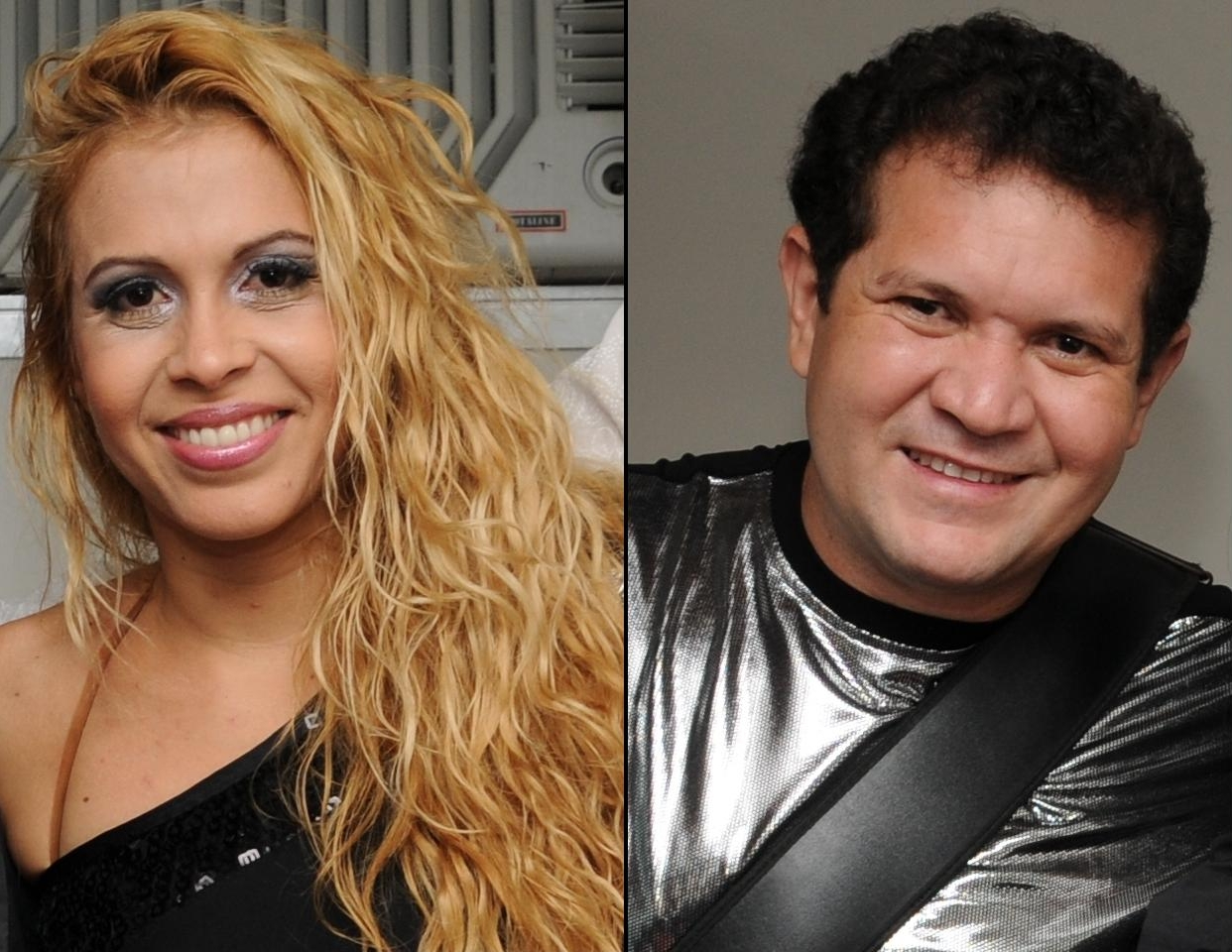
Joelma and Chimbinha in 2009

The bandage debut was 100 000 copies, and soon they released the album's single Vida Minha was present at several stops, including the Hot 100 Brazil. The band continued with their musical diversity, the song 'Sunday to Saturday' that has participation of composers Edu & Maraial have one taken from Sertanejo and Baiao, the song 'Flame Warrior' with the participation of David Assayag & Edilson Santana with an Amazonian and taken to Carimbó, Cumbia subject and Boi Bumba, besides this one also has the Calipso, Lambada and Forró.

In return for Title Citizens Pernambucanos the band recorded their DVD celebrating 10 years on November 6, 2009, in the area outside of the Chevrolet Hall in Recife. The show featured appearances from artists like Maestro Spok, Bruno & Marrone, Fagner and Voz da Verdade. The DVD was launched symbolically on March 14, 2010 in Domingão Faustão. It was released on DVD with all 27 tracks, and two CDs sold separately.

In February 2010, the band participated again in the Galo da Madrugada of Recife and in March released the album ! Come Swing who has hits like Come Swing and Perdoa . In August 2010, was releasing live album Live in Recife which contains songs from the previous album, but the songs on the Live version and three previously unreleased songs like the Cure' ',' 'Just for Me' '(which is the Portuguese version of the song' 'Stand by Me' ') and "Tá Mentindo.

Despite the release of this album was soon followed by the CD / DVD 10 years recorded in Recife, this had a great response and acceptance from the public and is considered one of the best albums of his career today. The album is released on the first edition and has sold over 100 000 copies. The first single was the song Come Swing they played in various Brazilian radio stations and ranked among the 100 most played country. In a short time the CD was already in the mouth of fans, that in all concerts asked the band to play the new songs, making the same change of improvised repertoire, taking requests from fans.

At the end of 2010 the band toured Europe.

=== 2011–2015: Last Years ===
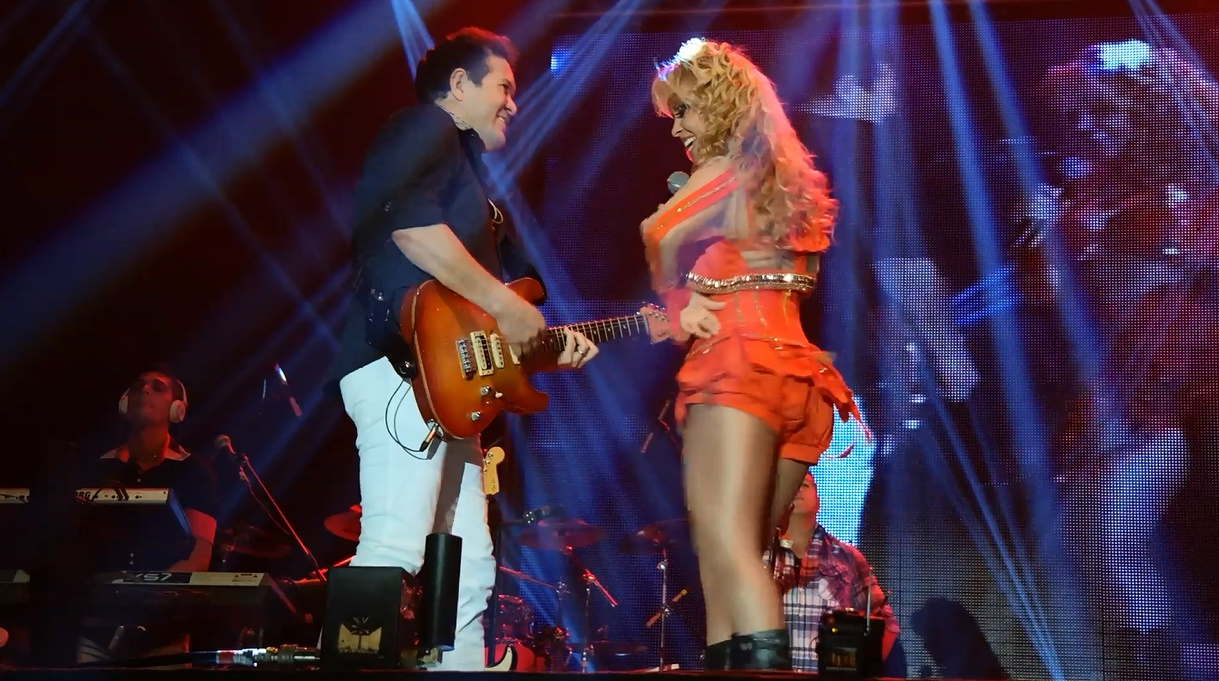
The Banda Calypso performing in 2015

In May 2011, the CD is released Meu Encanto. The album features quite daring in terms of variety of rhythms, mixed by the band quite as African Zouk rhythms, the tracks Isso Não é Amor and Sinônimo de Amor , and brought the Calipso arrangements with accordion, an instrument is best known for forró, on the track "Ataque de Leão and also a mix of backcountry with romantic ballad "Meus Medos" and Noite Fria Cama Vazia . Highlights for the tracks "Meu Encanto track that gives name to the project, Se Pedir um Beijo eu Dou", Doa em Quem Doer, Entre Tapas and Beijos, rewriting Leandro & Leonardo that opens the miniseries Tapas & Beijos, the Rede Globo and Não Posso Negar que Te Amo, which features the participation of the king of Brega, Reginaldo Rossi.

The album was officially released on May 16, 2011 in stores. On television, the band released the album on June 5, 2011, in the program Tudo é Possivel, the Rede Record, on the same day, they released the single Meu Encanto and there was a first performance of the song Não Posso Negar que Te Amo with Reginaldo Rossi this in a TV show.

Banda Calypso Ao Vivo in Angola was recorded during the International Music Festival of Sumbe in Angola. Despite logistical difficulties, the band wanted to record the DVD during presentations at the Festival as a way to pay tribute to the people of that country.

There are 18 songs that show different stages of their career. Among the successes are Meu Encanto , Homem Perfeito (El Hombre Perfecto), Ardendo de Amor, Entre Tapas and Beijos (one of the most performed songs of the band, rereading the success Leandro & Leonardo, a super version "up" with the guitar Ximbinha punctuating vocals by Joelma Mendes), Doa em Quem Doer, Te Encontrei, Potpourri: Principe Encantado / Me Telefona / Você me Enganou, a track that pays homage Angola:"O Som da Africa", with the participation of the African drum "djembe" and vocal Anselmo Ralph, Angolan idol singing with Joelma, Meus Medos, Perdoa, A Cura, Blackout , Imagino , Ataque de um Leão, De Joelhos, Pot-pourri of Carimbó: Pra Dançar Carimbó / Rebola and Vai Pegar Fogo.

Eternos Namorados is the eleventh studio album and eighteenth in total the band released on 3 November 2012. The album contains 12 tracks, and 2 remakes, O Que é Que Adianta?, which came remixed and El Perdiste Trono, the Spanish version of the song Perdeu o Trono. The album features several tracks featured as: Quem Ama não Deixa de Amar which contains the participation of the singer Amado Batista and is part of the soundtrack of the novel Balacobaco Rede Record, Me Beija Agora which is part of the soundtrack of the novel Guerra dos Sexos Rede Globo, The End that plays with your letter variations in Portuguese and English and O Poder de Deus which is the first composition Joelma vocalist.

On June 15, 2013 the day they released the thirteenth studio album and the nineteenth career, titled Eu Me Rendo. Most of the songs on this disc are the Bachata rhythm, a rhythm from the Dominican Republic. The album contains such hits as "Eu Me Rendo", "A Festa Começou", "Malhando com Calypso " among others. There are also some remakes like "Abandonada" the Fafa de Belém, "Pressentimento" singer Fagner and "Onde Anda Meu Amor" the backcountry Léo Magalhães. And some other hit singles.

On August 8, 2013, in Ceilândia during O maior São João do cerrado in the city of Brasília, they recorded the 7th DVD band. The songs Eu Me Rendo, "Me beija Agora", "The End", "Paris", "A Festa Começou", "Se Joga" and "Quem Ama não Deixa de Amar" were part of the repertoire that also included other major successes of this band.

On July 31, 2014, they released the internet's fourteenth studio album and twenty-first of his career, titled Vibrations. Contains only 10 tracks. The official first single from the CD is "Vibrations", and the non-official singles are "The pat of Calypso" and "Let's Stay Well", since both were played on television programs.

To celebrate the 15-year career, the Banda Calypso recorded on 23 November at the Clock Square, in Belém, a commemorative DVD. . The show featured the participation of fans who came from all parts of Brazil, with a total audience of more than 80,000 people in the center of Bethlehem Several friends made appearances: Lia Sophia, the singer Daniel (with a new song "my Life is not Life Without You, "the group Calcinha Preta, pastor Ludmila Ferber and several local artists. the DVD is set to be released in April 2015.

Joelma and Ximbinha traveled to Miami to start recording of a new CD, now in Spanish, with the help of producer Cesar Lemos. Recording took place at Circle House Studios. The album was never released due to separation of the couple and the end of the band. After being announced the separation of the leaders, Joelma resigned from the Banda Calypso in December and continues his solo career, with the same rhythm that gave prominence to it. The advisory services confirmed the words of Joelma and that it came to be called, artistically, Joelma Calypso and Ximbinha as Ximbinha, now follows with his new band, the XCalypso. The end of the band was marked by several episodes conturbadores affecting the activities of the same. The band ended its activities on December 31, 2015 with a New Year's Eve show in Macapá only with the presence of Joelma the front of the band.

== Discography ==
Studio albums

- 1999: Volume 1
- 2002: O Ritmo que Conquistou o Brasil!
- 2003: Volume 4
- 2004: Volume 6
- 2005: Volume 8
- 2007: Volume 10
- 2008: Acústico
- 2009: Amor Sem Fim
- 2010: Vem Valançar!
- 2011: Meu Encanto
- 2012: Eternos Namorados
- 2013: Eu Me Rendo
- 2014: Vibrações

Live albums

- 2001: Ao Vivo
- 2004: Ao Vivo em São Paulo
- 2005: Na Amazônia
- 2006: Pelo Brazil
- 2007: Ao Vivo em Goiânia
- 2009: 10 Anos
- 2010: Ao Vivo em Recife
- 2012: Ao Vivo em Angola
- 2013: Ao Vivo no Distrito Federal
- 2015: 15 Anos

== Tours ==
- 1999: Turnê Dançando Calypso
- 2003: Turnê Ao Vivo em São Paulo
- 2004: Turnê Na Amazônia
- 2005: Turnê Isso é Calypso
- 2006: Turnê Calypso Pelo Brasil
- 2007: Turnê Acelerou
- 2008: Turnê Ao Vivo em Goiânia
- 2009: Turnê Amor Sem Fim
- 2009: Turnê 10 Anos
- 2010: Turnê Vem Balançar
- 2011: Turnê Meu Encanto
- 2011: Turnê Angola
- 2012:Turnê 2012
- 2012:Turnê Me Beija Agora
- 2013:Turnê Eternos Namorados
- 2014:Turnê A Festa Começou
- 2015:Turnê 15 Anos

== See also ==
- List of best-selling Latin music artists
