= Volume 4 (Banda Calypso album) =

Studio album by Banda Calypso
- Released: October 2003
- Recorded: June 2003
- Genres: brega pop; cumbia; merengue; flamenco; carimbó
- Language: Portuguese
- Label: Calypso Produções
- Producer: Chimbinha

Banda Calypso chronology
O Ritmo Que Conquistou o Brasil! (2002)	Volume 4 (2003)	Ao Vivo em São Paulo (2004)

Singles from Volume 4
- 1. "Pra Te Esquecer" Released: 2003; 2. "Nenê" Released: 2003; 3. "Imagino" Released: 2003

Volume 4 is the fourth album by Brazilian group Banda Calypso, released in October 2003 on the band's independent label, Calypso Produções. It was recorded in São Paulo. The album sold more than 600,000 copies and received platinum and double diamond certifications.

== Track listing ==
No.	Title	Length
1.	"Pra Te Esquecer"	04:17
2.	"Nenê"	03:26
3.	"Primeiro Amor"	03:36
4.	"Anjo"	03:38
5.	"Paquera"	03:48
6.	"Fala Pra Mim"	03:44
7.	"Homem Perfeito"	04:15
8.	"Complicado Coração"	02:57
9.	"Lágrimas de Sangue"	02:36
10.	"Imagino"	03:44
11.	"Tic-Tac"	03:33
12.	"Você Também Errou"	02:59
13.	"Uma Rosa"	03:35
14.	"Maria"	02:45
15.	"Pot-pourri de Carimbó: Canto De Carimbó / Lua Luar / Canto De Atravessar"	04:11
