= Amado Batista =

Brazilian musician and singer

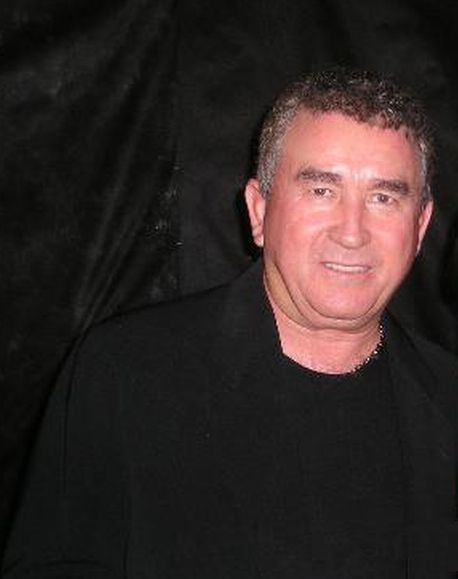

Background information
- Born: Amado Rodrigues Batista; 17 February 1951 (age 75); Catalão, Goiás, Brazil
- Genres: Brega; MPB; Sertanejo
- Occupations: Singer, musician, composer, producer, businessman
- Years active: 1975–present

Amado Batista (Catalão, 17 February 1951) is a Brazilian singer. He also acted in some Brazilian films of the 1980s. He placed 86 in the poll O Maior Brasileiro de Todos os Tempos. During his more than 40 years of career, he recorded 38 albums and sold more than 13 million records, received hundreds of awards, including 28 gold, 28 platinum and one diamond records, consecrating himself as one of the artists best selling in the history of Brazilian music.

== Discography ==
- Amado Batista (1975)
- Canta o Amor (1977)
- Sementes de Amor (1978)
- O Amor não é só de Rosas (1979)
- Um Pouco de Esperança (1981)
- Sol Vermelho (1982)
- Pensando em Você (1983)
- Casamento Forçado (1984)
- Seresteiro das Noites (1985)
- Vitamina e Cura (1986)
- Hospício (1987)
- Dinamite De Amor (1988)
- Escuta... (1989)
- Eu Sou Seu Fã (1991)
- Um Pedaço de Mim (1992)
- Meu Jeitinho (1994)
- Tum Tum de Saudade (1995)
- 24 Horas no Ar (1996)
- Amar, Amar (1997)
- Amado Batista Ao Vivo (1998)
- O Pobretão (1999)
- Estou Só (2000)
- Amor (2001)
- Eu Te Amo (2002)
- Eu Quero é Namorar (2003)
- Especial Vol. 1 (2003)
- É o Show (2004)
- 30 Anos... de Carreira (2005)
- Perdido de Amor (2006)
- Em Foco (2007)
- Amado Batista Acústico (2008)
- Meu Louco Amor (2010)
- Amor Perfeito: Os Maiores Sucessos de Amado Batista (2012)
- Amado Batista: Duetos (2013)
- O Negócio da China (2014)
- Amado Batista - 40 Anos (2016)
- Amado Batista - 44 Anos (2019)
- Amado Batista - Em Casa (2022)

== See also ==
- List of best-selling Latin music artists
