= Brega (music) =

Brazilian popular music genre

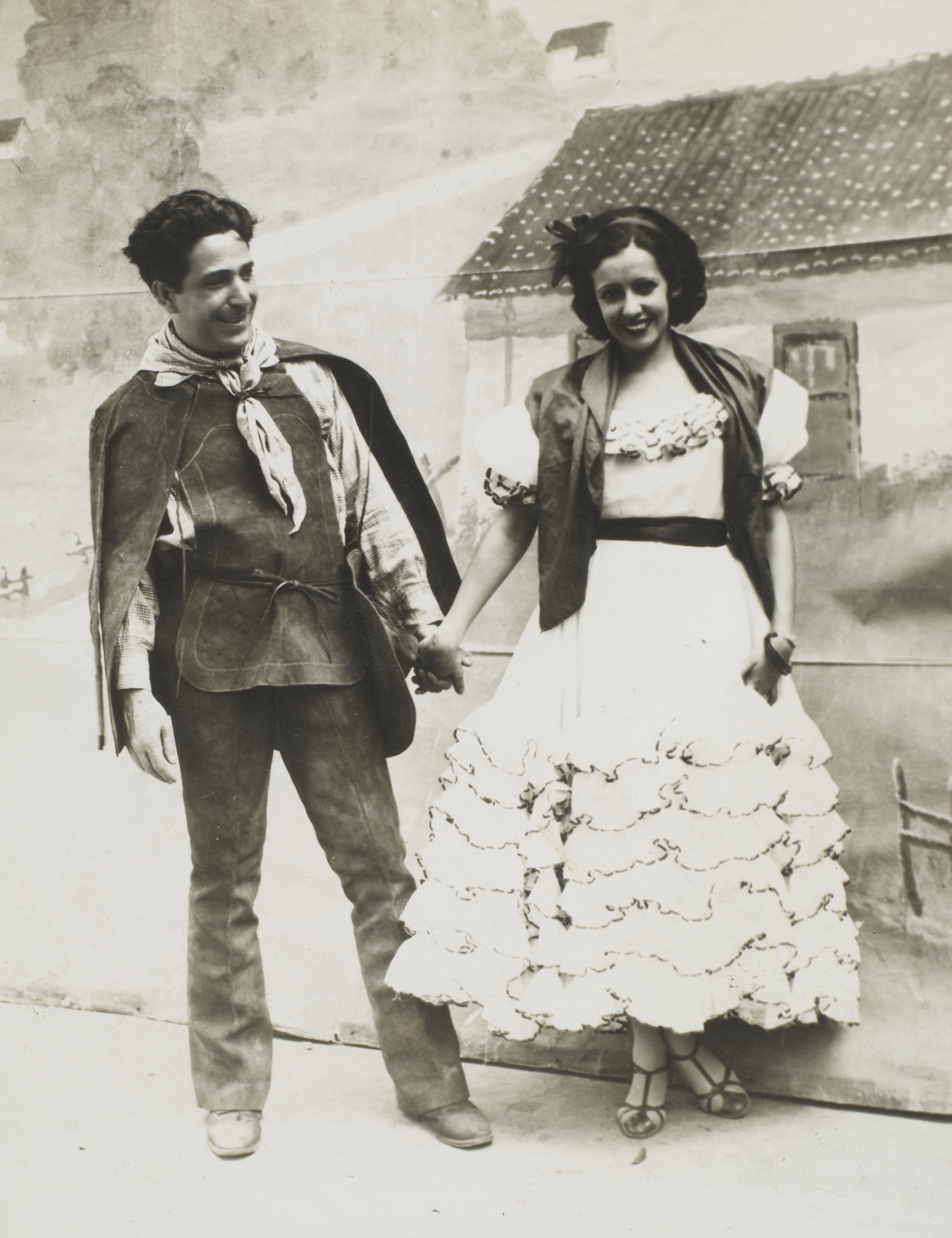
- The singer and composer Vicente Celestino with Gilda de Abreu in 1933. The singer is considered one of the pioneers of dramatic brega music.
- Stylistic origins: Samba-canção; bolero; Jovem Guarda; pop rock; beat music; soul music
- Cultural origins: 1970s, Brazil

Subgenres
- Brega pop; tecnobrega; brega funk

Brega is a Brazilian musical style and genre that encompasses a variety of rhythms, making it difficult to define a single musical aesthetic. The term emerged pejoratively, used to characterize the romantic and dramatic music of the 1940s and 1950s, considered low-quality or "tacky." Its musical origins are linked to samba-canção, bolero, and Jovem Guarda, and its evolution has been marked by the assimilation of influences and resistance to the hegemonic standards of the recording industry.

Regarding its etymology, the word brega has multiple interpretations. One hypothesis traces it back to terms like esbregue, used in Rio de Janeiro to describe something poorly made, and xumbrega, associated with drunkenness and later with brothels. This semantic load contributed to the term being used in a stigmatizing manner, especially to refer to cultural productions linked to working-class and peripheral regions. However, from the 1980s onward, the label gradually began to be reclaimed as a distinct musical category, particularly in the North and Northeast regions of Brazil, where it consolidated as a relevant cultural expression.

In recent decades, brega has branched out into various subgenres, such as brega pop, tecnobrega, and brega funk, demonstrating its ability to adapt to new contexts and influences. Recognized as intangible cultural heritage in Recife and Pará, the genre maintains a strong presence in the regional and national music scene. Its trajectory reflects dynamics of aesthetic and cultural transformation, as well as tensions related to artistic valuation criteria and class-based prejudices, establishing itself as a significant manifestation of Brazilian popular music.

== Etymology ==
There are several hypotheses regarding the origin of the word brega as a synonym for brothel and, later, for a musical style. According to Houaiss Dictionary of the Portuguese Language, the term means "bad taste," "tacky," or "inferior," possibly derived from esbregue, an expression used in Rio de Janeiro between the 1920s and 1950s to refer to something poorly made, mediocre, or ordinary.

Another theory, defended by etymologists such as Sérgio Nogueira and Amaro Quintas, links brega to xumbrega. This word is believed to have originated in Pernambuco in 1666, stemming from the nickname "Xumbergas" given to the Portuguese colonial administrator Jerônimo de Mendonça Furtado, in reference to the German general Schomberg. As he was fond of alcoholic beverages, the term came to mean "drunkenness," giving rise to the verbs xumbregar (to get drunk or to bother) and the adjective xumbrega (of bad quality). From this meaning, the term is thought to have evolved in the 20th century to designate brothels, as recorded in dictionaries such as those by Aurélio Ferreira, Houaiss, and Michaelis. An alternative hypothesis, proposed by Altair J. Aranha, suggests that brega derives from Nóbrega, the name of a street in Salvador known for housing red-light districts.

The term "brega" was historically used pejoratively by the middle and upper classes, associating it with low-income individuals and the brothels of the Northeast, where romantic and dramatic music was common. It was only from the 1980s onward that brega came to designate a specific strand of popular music, previously simply called cafona (tacky). It is important to distinguish between the term's use as an adjective (pejorative) and as a noun (referring to a musical genre with its own characteristics), although these two dimensions are interconnected.

The Rio-born singer Vicente Celestino, in the 1930s, is considered one of the precursors of brega as a dramatic musical genre. In the North and Northeast regions, the style remained alive and consolidated as a significant musical force, even though it was ignored by major radio stations and record labels. Local artists continued to produce, often with limited resources, maintaining a loyal audience in urban peripheries. According to UN Tourism, Belém do Pará became the main hub for the consolidation of brega as a style. Initially restricted to dances (called bregões) in peripheral nightclubs, the genre gained regional dimension with aparelhagem parties, which emerged in the outskirts of Belém in the 1940s, using powerful sound systems to animate large dance gatherings.

== History ==
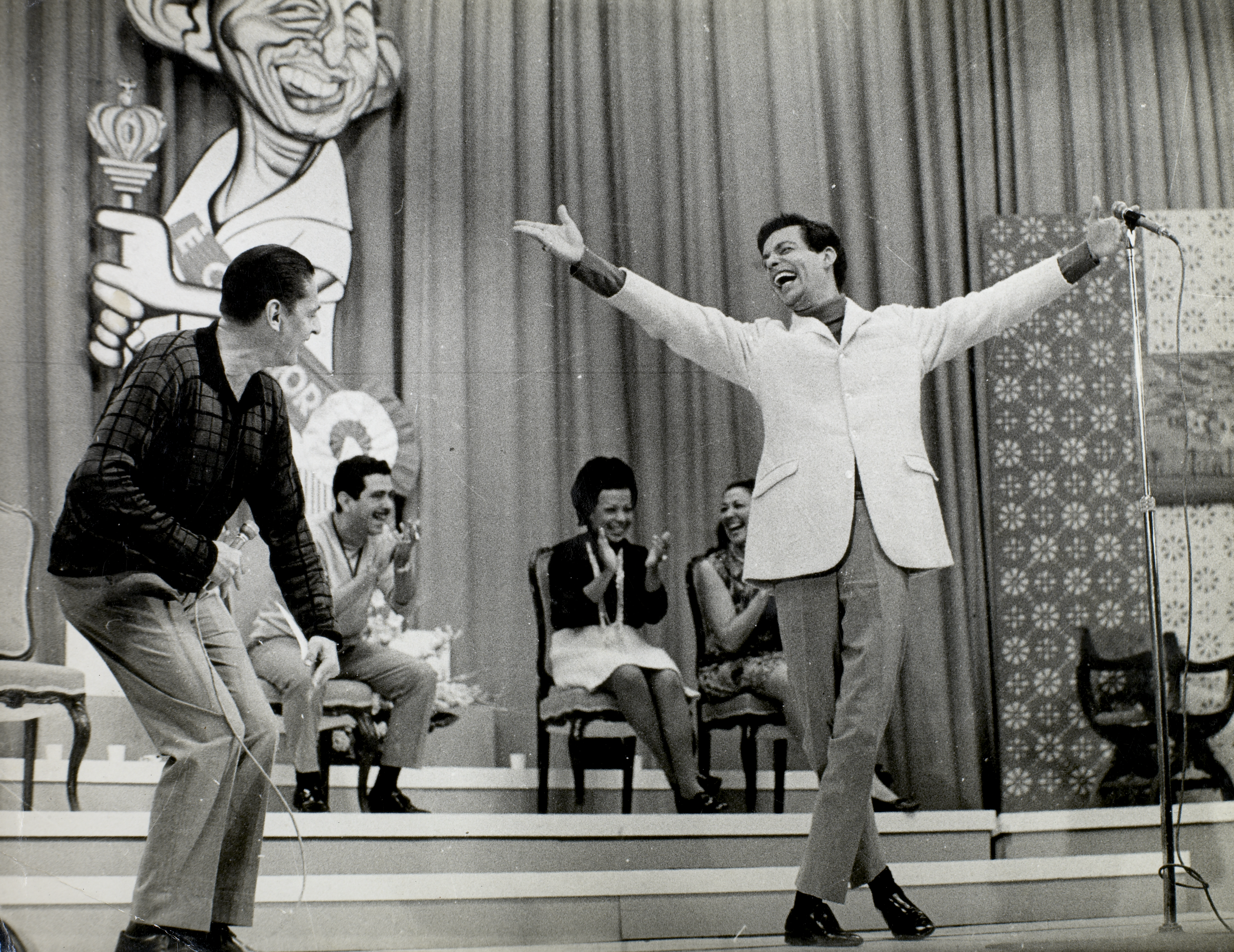
Cauby Peixoto, one of the precursors of brega music

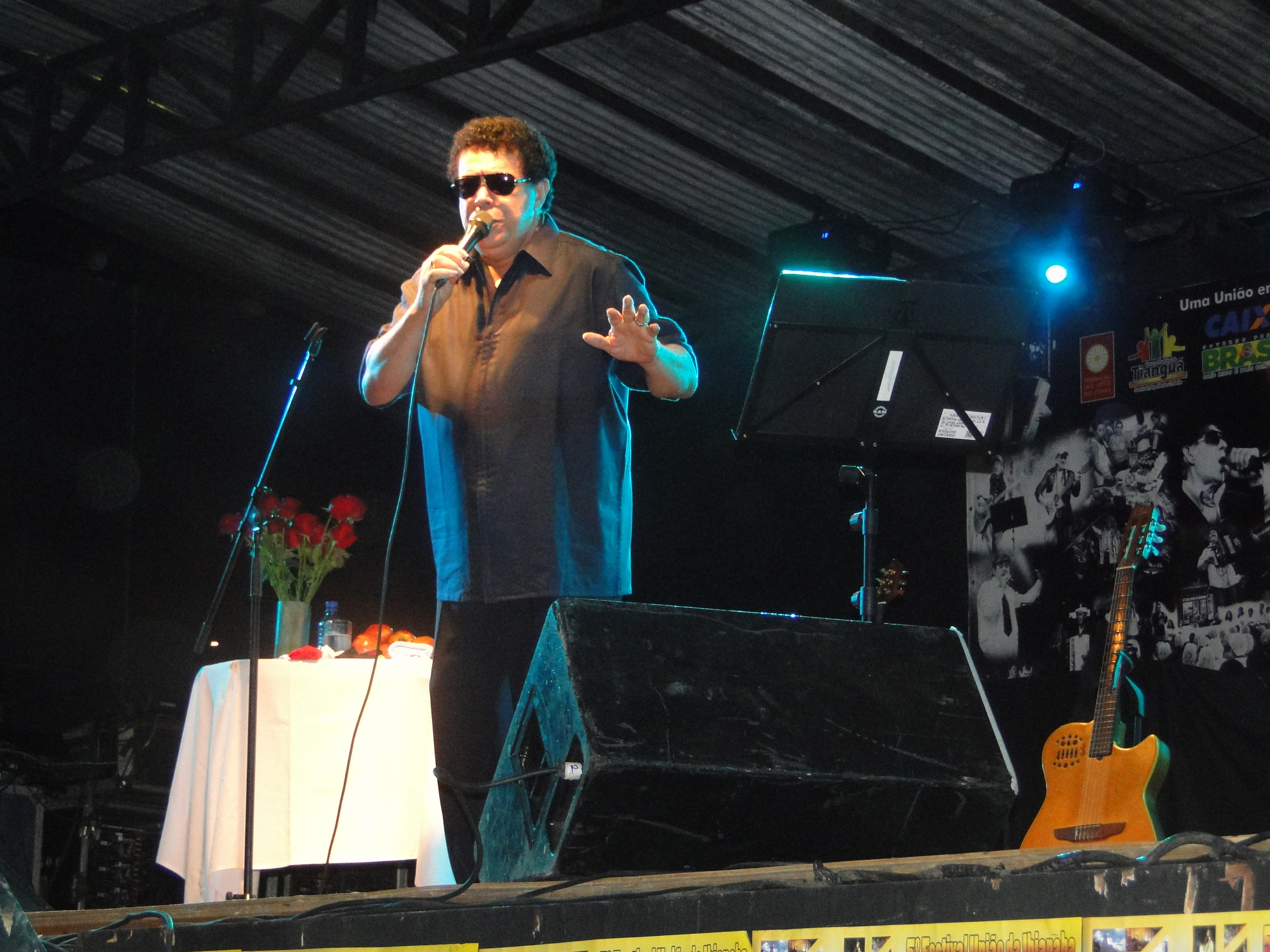
Wando singing in 2011

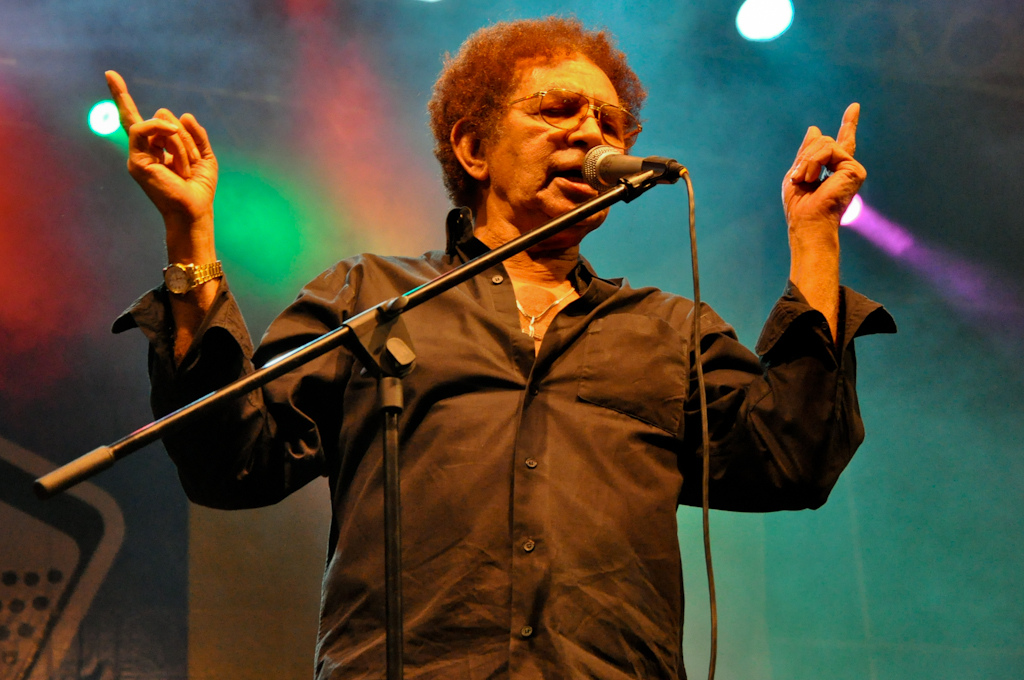
Reginaldo Rossi proclaimed himself as "The King of Brega".

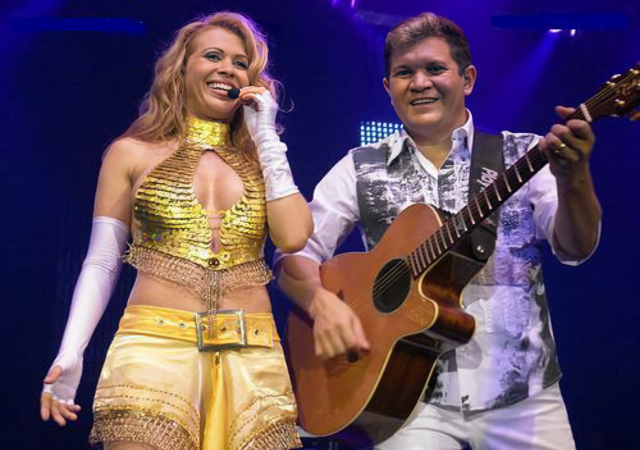
Banda Calypso was the leading exponent of brega pop in the 2000s.

Although there is no single, precise musical origin for the genre, critics and researchers point out that in the 1940s and 1950s, singers such as Cauby Peixoto, Orlando Dias, Carlos Alberto, and Alcides Gerardi were already cultivating a romantic and sentimental theme based mainly on bolero and samba-canção – rhythms that would later be considered stylistic seeds of what would come to be called "brega." These artists, however, did not yet carry this label, which would only emerge decades later with a pejorative connotation.

In the 1960s, romantic music produced by and for the popular classes began to be seen as "tacky" and inelegant by urban elites and specialized critics. This judgment was accentuated by the emergence of innovative musical movements that won over urban youth and the middle class: MPB (Brazilian Popular Music), with a more politicized and sophisticated discourse; Tropicalismo, of an avant-garde and experimental character; and Jovem Guarda, which adapted foreign rock 'n' roll to national taste. It was precisely Jovem Guarda that opened space for artists who would later be associated with brega, such as Reginaldo Rossi – who started in the rock band The Silver Jets before becoming one of the genre's biggest names.

In the 1970s, while MPB solidified itself as the canon of "good taste" in music, artists who achieved commercial success with romantic and accessible songs – many from the peripheries – began to be stigmatized with the term cafona (tacky). Names like Paulo Sérgio, Altemar Dutra, Odair José, Reginaldo Rossi, and Waldick Soriano, although they sold many records, were scorned by hegemonic critics. In the late 1970s, a bolder and more danceable version of cafona emerged, influenced by disco and international pop, led by Sidney Magal and Gretchen, who mixed romance with sensual choreography and lyrics considered bold for the time.

Starting in the 1980s, the press began using the term brega broadly and pejoratively to refer to music considered in bad taste, overly dramatic, or naive, aimed at the working-class public. Artists such as Amado Batista and Wando became symbols of this label. However, the definition of what constituted "brega music" became increasingly imprecise, as the term began to be applied also to performers from other established genres, such as Alcione (samba) and Chitãozinho & Xororó (sertanejo), and even to MPB singers like Gal Costa when they recorded more popular-sounding songs. The same decade saw the emergence of other styles marginalized by critics, such as axé music and funk carioca, and the appearance of artists who consciously and often ironically incorporated brega elements into their work, such as Eduardo Dusek (with the LP Brega-chique, 1984) and the band Língua de Trapo.

In the 1990s, brega began to undergo a process of re-evaluation and greater acceptance, even among intellectual circles and the musical mainstream. Reginaldo Rossi proclaimed himself the "King of Brega" and, with the national success of "Garçom", became an icon, even receiving cover versions by established artists like Caetano Veloso. Bands like Vexame and Os Copacabanas satirized the cafona repertoire with success among university audiences, while groups like Mamonas Assassinas achieved enormous popularity with an "over-the-top," humorous, and pop-oriented brega style.

Simultaneously, in the North and Northeast regions, brega developed as an independent and vibrant cultural force, especially in Belém do Pará. There, far from the Rio-São Paulo axis, artists created an alternative circuit of production (often homemade) and distribution (carried out by street vendors and hawkers), consolidating a parallel record market. The famous aparelhagem parties – with powerful sound systems – became the genre's main stage, mixing romantic brega, international pop, and Caribbean rhythms. From this cultural melting pot emerged two important subgenres: "brega pop," with lyrics ranging from romantic to eroticized, an upbeat tempo, and emphasis on guitars (with Banda Calypso as its biggest national exponent); and "tecnobrega," which fused the melodic base of brega with electronic beats and technological production resources, creating a highly danceable and innovative sound.

The brega scene in Pará is marked by a distinct stylistic evolution. The genre began with "flash-brega" or "brega-saudade," slower and danced closely, represented by artists like Frankito Lopes (with hits like "Eu te amo meu amor"). Next emerged brega pop, faster and more guitar-driven. Finally, "tecnobrega" (also called "melody") became established, incorporating elements of electronic music and samples, creating an intense sonic experience at aparelhagem parties. The choreography at these events is also unique, with terms like caquiado – a quick foot flourish, especially performed to the sound of merengue – being part of the local culture. In 2021, brega was officially recognized as an intangible cultural heritage of the state of Pará, attesting to its historical and social importance.

== Conceptualization ==
In the 1960s, the term brega became established as a designation for a specific type of romantic music, characterized by simple musical arrangements, unpolished production, and sentimental or dramatic lyrics. Originating mainly from the popular classes, this music was often labeled as "tacky" or "inelegant" by specialized critics and by the middle and upper sectors of society. Despite the stigma, this style maintained great popularity in peripheral dances, regional radio stations, and variety shows, where artists such as Altemar Dutra, Waldick Soriano, and Paulo Sérgio achieved significant record sales. Over time, brega became systematized in a less rigid way, absorbing influences from diverse genres and broadening its musical scope.

Over the following decades, the brega sound incorporated elements from other rhythms, generating hybrid subgenres. In 2008, in the city of Recife, brega-funk emerged, resulting from the fusion of Angolan kizomba, French Antillean zouk, and traditional romantic ballads. This subgenre retains the sentimental appeal and dramatic lyrics but features an electronic beat and more modern production. The conceptual imprecision of the term brega—a legacy of its pejorative and classist origins—allows it to be applied to a variety of artists and styles, contributing to the lack of consensus regarding its boundaries.

Starting in the 1990s, brega branched out into new subgenres that distanced themselves from the original romantic model. Among them, brega pop and tecnobrega stand out, introducing the modernization of instruments, the use of synthesizers, and a faster, more danceable beat. These variations became especially popular in the North and Northeast regions of Brazil, gaining space at aparelhagem parties and regional radio stations. Bands such as Calypso and Dejavu, along with the consolidation of Reginaldo Rossi as the "King of Brega," contributed to the spread of the genre even in the South of the country. Meanwhile, part of the "old guard" continued to reject the label, preferring to associate themselves with styles such as American twist, from Paul Anka and Jerry Lee Lewis.

Although some artists resisted the classification, others embraced it with pride. Reginaldo Rossi, who began his career in rock with the band The Silver Jets, saw his sentimental songs ironically nicknamed brega by elite circles. However, he embraced the title and built a public image around the moniker "King of Brega," remaining faithful to romantic ballads until the end of his career. Today, brega continues to enjoy broad acceptance among popular segments, remaining an important part of the regional music market and themed parties throughout Brazil.

The definition of what constitutes the "brega style" remains a subject of debate among researchers, critics, and the public. This difficulty stems from the hybrid and plural nature of contemporary music, which promotes constant appropriation and reinterpretation of references, making rigid categorization impossible. Moreover, the term carries a pejorative burden linked to hierarchies of taste and class prejudice, which complicates its acceptance by artists and listeners. In practice, genres such as romantic sertanejo, pagode, axé, and funk carioca are often associated with brega by portions of the public, varying according to the social context and cultural repertoire of those classifying them. Among artists, there are those who vehemently reject the label, such as Wando and Waldick Soriano, and those who assume it as an identity, like Reginaldo Rossi and representatives of Pará's tecnobrega. The very existence of subgenres such as brega pop and tecnobrega indicates a resignification of the term, which evolves from a simple pejorative adjective to a musical category with its own characteristics and cultural legitimacy.

== Critics ==
In the Enciclopédia da Música Brasileira by Marcos Antonio Marcondes, brega is described as "the most banal, obvious, direct, sentimental, and routine music possible", marked by the uncreative use of musical clichés. Researcher Lúcia José adds that its sound structures would be standardized, lacking contrast, resulting in uniform and unoriginal arrangements.

In contrast, some specialists question this label, arguing that the marginalization of brega in official historiography reflects the dominance of privileged groups who act as arbiters of taste, excluding artists and trends that do not align with their identity perspectives. Although there are criticisms about an alleged political apathy of the genre, songs such as "O Caminhante" (Dom and Ravel) and "O Camburão" (Paulo Sérgio) show socially critical content. Moreover, in contexts such as the military dictatorship, the skepticism and melancholy present in the "tacky" repertoire acquired, even if unintentionally, a transgressive and resistant character.

Historian Paulo Cesar de Araújo places brega "in historical limbo," explaining that the pejorative classification arises when the middle class identifies neither tradition (such as the roots of samba) nor modernity (starting with Bossa Nova) in these productions. For him, the popular devotion to artists such as Paulo Sérgio – visible in visits to his tomb – constitutes a "phenomenon" that reveals the gap between the memory of marginalized groups and the dominant national memory, functioning as an act of cultural resistance. Complementing this view, Fernando Fontanella associates the relationship between "brega music" and "bad taste" with a class-structuring process, in which cultural hierarchies are defined by hegemonic institutions to benefit and legitimize dominant groups.

== See also ==
- Tecno brega
- Music of Brazil
- Kitsch
- Brega pop
