= Banda Calypso (album) =

Volume 1

Studio album by Banda Calypso
- Released: November 1999
- Recorded: 1998–1999
- Genres: brega pop; forró; zouk
- Length: 50 min
- Label: Calypso Produções
- Producer: Chimbinha

Banda Calypso chronology
| Volume 1 (1999) | Ao Vivo (2002) |

Singles from Volume 01
- 1. "Vendaval" Released: 1999; 2. "Disse Adeus" Released: 2000; 3. "Amor Nas Estrelas" Released: 2000; 4. "Solidão" Released: 2000; 5. "Deusa da Paixão" Released: 2000; 6. "Dois Corações" Released: 2000; 7. "Dançando Calypso" Released: 2001

Banda Calypso is the debut studio album of the Brazilian group of the same name released on November by 1999, through the record label independet Calypso Productions. The album was produced by guitarist and husband of vocalist Joelma, Chimbinha. The album, it was a sleeper hit, It was certified platinum and selling over 500,000 units in the Brazil. Banda Calypso is a brega pop record incorporating an array of genres, such as zouk, Latin, forró. It explores lyrical themes such as relationships.

== Track listing ==
| No. | Title | Writer(s) | Producer(s) | Length |
|---|---|---|---|---|
| 1. | "Vendaval" | Adilson Ribeiro; Bruno Rafael | Chimbinha | 02:49 |
| 2. | "Dançando Calypso" | Josiel; Carla Maués | Chimbinha | 03:11 |
| 3. | "Anjo do Prazer" | Nick Oliveira; Geovanio Lucena | Chimbinha | 03:50 |
| 4. | "Solidão" | Tonny Brasil; Tarciso França | Chimbinha | 03:18 |
| 5. | "Solos da Paixão" | Nick Oliveira; Zilmarc Paulino | Chimbinha | 03:39 |
| 6. | "Sem Você" | Chimbinha; Tonny Brasil | Chimbinha | 02:41 |
| 7. | "Amor nas Estrelas" | Edilson Moreno; Ronildo Júnior | Chimbinha | 03:37 |
| 8. | "Dois Corações" | Tonny Brasil; Matheus Fernandes | Chimbinha | 03:06 |
| 9. | "Disse Adeus" | Chimbinha; Tonny Brasil | Chimbinha | 03:44 |
| 10. | "Amor Bandido" | Tonny Brasil | Chimbinha | 02:55 |
| 11. | "Deusa da Paixão" | Nick Oliveira | Chimbinha | 03:25 |
| 12. | "Feito Tatuagem" | Adilson Ribeiro | Chimbinha | 03:22 |

=== Bonus Tracks Second Edition ===
| No. | Title | Writer(s) | Producer(s) | Length |
|---|---|---|---|---|
| 13. | "Loirinha" | Ronaldo Bahia | Chimbinha | 04:06 |
| 14. | "Rubi" | Junior Neves | Chimbinha | 03:33 |
| 15. | "Brega Fò" | Chimbinha; Edilson Moreno; Tonny Brasil | Chimbinha | 03:13 |
