= Tecno brega =

Genre of music

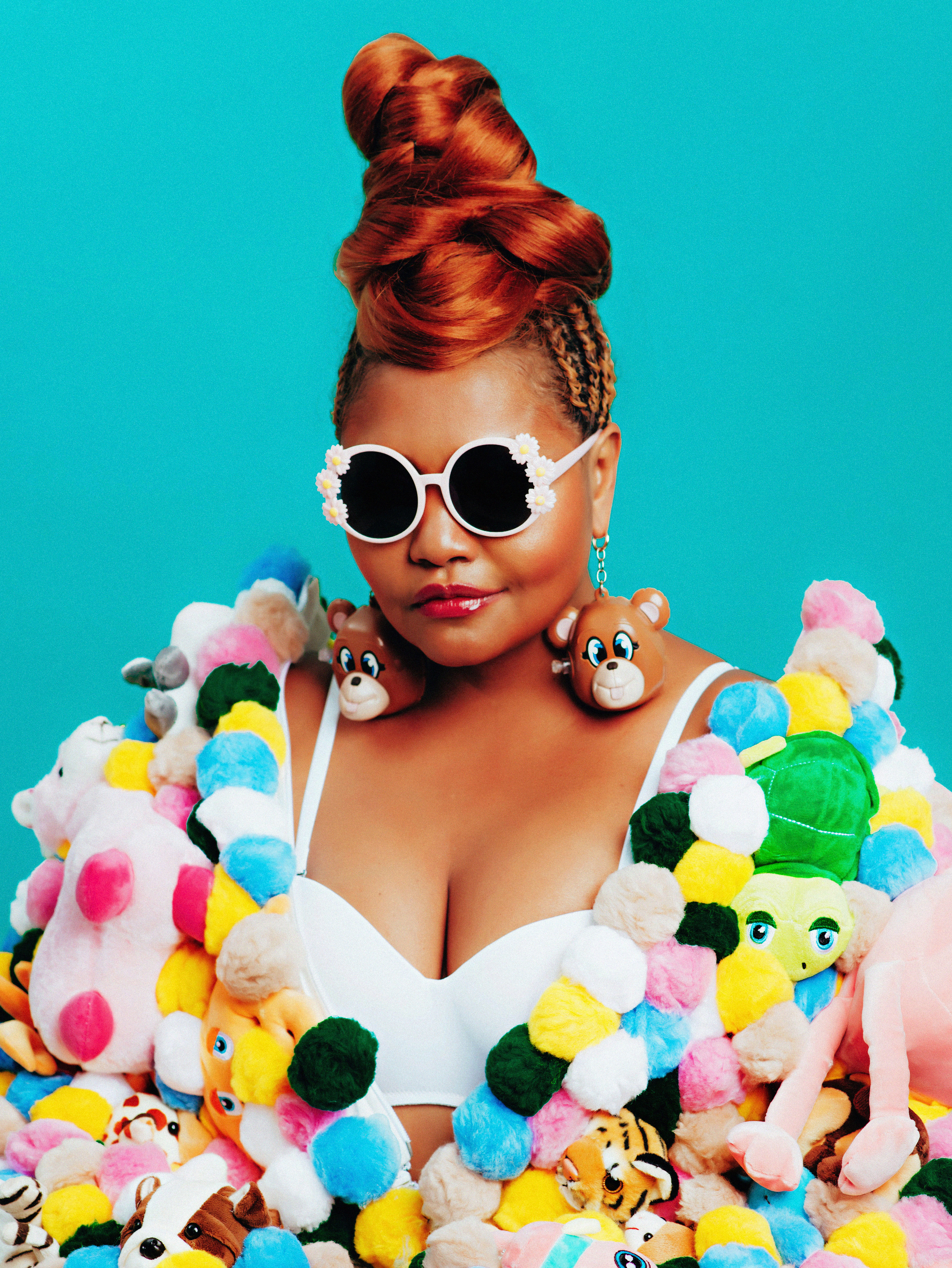
- Stylistic origins: Brega; forró; calypso; techno; synthpop
- Cultural origins: Early 2000s, North Brazil (particularly Belém, Pará)
- Typical instruments: Synthesizer, sequencer, keyboard, sampler

Tecno brega or technobrega (technotacky) is a form of music from northern Brazil, particularly Belém, Pará. Music of the genre is created primarily through remixing and reworking songs from popular music and music from the eighties. While there is a large amount of famous music used in tecno brega, the majority of it is original material (80%). Several DJs and music producers from the tecno brega movement were featured in the peer-to-peer filesharing documentary Good Copy Bad Copy.

== Production and distribution ==
The music is created by producers in makeshift studios, whether in bedrooms or other unused spaces. Rather than being sold in a traditional CD format, techno brega is characterized by new distribution methods. Rather than selling a CD in a store, tecno brega CDs are sold for a minimal price (averaging US$1.50) by street vendors, who often make the actual CDs themselves. Often producing their music with little concern for copyright, the music is "born free". The street vendor is then in charge of making more copies and using the CDs as advertisements. These advertisements are for large reggae sound systems style parties, very similar to a rave. It is at these concerts that producers will make money, whether by entrance fees or by selling CDs produced that night from live music.

== Sound system parties ==
The sound systems themselves become a competitive point, encouraging producers to have the most up to date electronic equipment. They may attract as many as 12,000–15, 000 people to a show. With typical attendance, they may sell an average of 77 CDs and 53 DVDs after a performance. At these shows a performer may also do "shout outs" to friends, family, or neighborhoods, making the CDs more valuable to the audience. Shout outs can also be bought by pre-purchasing a CD of the concert prior to the beginning of the show. A performance can earn the performer on average R$2,200 (approx. US$1250 as of March 2012) a show.

== Notable artists ==
- Gaby Amarantos
- Banda Uó
- DJ Cremoso
- Gang do Eletro
- Pabllo Vittar

== See also ==
- Brega pop
