= Reginaldo Rossi =

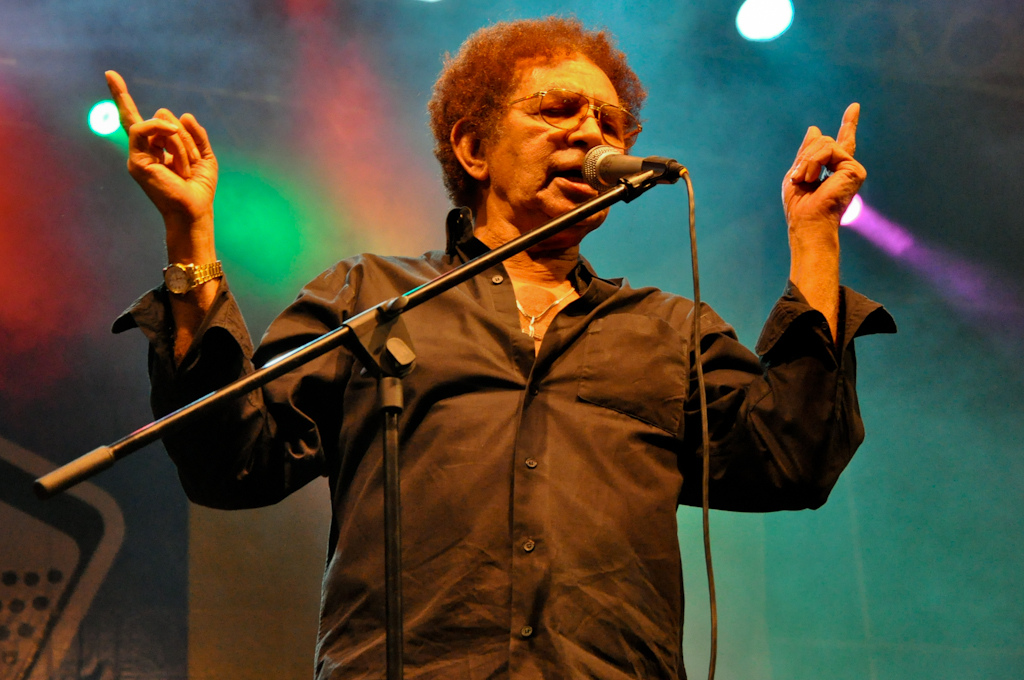
- Reginaldo Rossi on 26 June 2010 on the Castro Alves Square

Background information
- Born: Reginaldo Rodrigues dos Santos; 14 February 1944; Recife, Brazil
- Origin: Recife
- Died: 20 December 2013 (aged 69) Recife
- Genres: Brega, brazilian rock
- Occupations: Singer, songwriter
- Years active: 1964–2013
- Label: EMI

Reginaldo Rodrigues dos Santos (14 February 1944 – 20 December 2013), better known by his stage name Reginaldo Rossi, was a Brazilian musician and singer-songwriter. He was known as the "King of Brega" (Portuguese: "Rei do brega").

== Discography ==
LPs

- 1966 – O pão; Chantecler
- O rei leão
- 1967 – Festa dos pães; Chantecler
- 1968 – O Quente (1968); Chantecler
- 1970 – À procura de você; CBS
- 1971 – Reginaldo Rossi; CBS
- 1972 – Nos teus braços; CBS
- 1973 – Reginaldo Rossi; CBS
- 1974 – Reginaldo Rossi; CBS
- 1976 – Reginaldo Rossi; Beverly
- 1977 – Chega de promessas; CBS
- 1980 – A volta; EMI
- 1981 – Cheio de amor; EMI
- 1982 – A raposa e as uvas; EMI
- 1983 – Sonha comigo; EMI
- 1984– Não consigo te esquecer; EMI
- 1985 – Só sei que te quero bem; EMI
- 1986 – Com todo coração; EMI
- 1987 – Teu melhor amigo; EMI
- 1989 – Momentos de amor; EMI
- 1990 – O rei; EMI
- 1992 – Reginaldo Rossi; Celim

Albums

- 1997 – Reginaldo Rossi – Tão Sofrido; Polydisc
- 1998 – Reginaldo Rossi-ao vivo; Polydisc
- 1999 – Reginaldo Rossi the king; Sony Music
- 1999 – Popularidade-Reginaldo Rossi; Continental
- 2000 – Reginaldo Rossi; Sony Music
- 2001 – Reginaldo Rossi ao vivo; Sony Music
- 2001 – Para Sempre -Reginaldo Rossi; EMI
- 2003 – Reginaldo Rossi; EMI
- 2003 – Ao Vivo, O melhor do brega; Indie Records
- 2010 – Cabaret do Rossi

=== Greatest hits ===
- Se Meu Amor Não Chegar
- Garçom (Reginaldo Rossi)
- A raposa e as uvas (Reginaldo Rossi)
- O pão (Reginaldo Rossi, Orácio Faustino e Namyr Cury)
- Deixa de banca (Borogodá version, of Pocker, made by Eduardo Araújo and Ferrer)
- Tô doidão (Picket e F. Thomas)
- Mon amour, meu bem, ma femme (Cleide)
- Era Domingo (Reginaldo Rossi)
- Ai, Amor (Reginaldo Rossi)
- Em Plena Lua de Mel (Reginaldo Rossi)
- Tenta Esquecer (Reginaldo Rossi)

== Cancer and death ==
On 9 November 2013, Rossi a very heavy smoker went through a surgical procedure called thoracentesis removing 2 liters of accumulated fluids between the pleura and the lung. The biopsy revealed on the 11th of the same month the confirmation of lung cancer. Reginaldo Rossi died on 20 December 2013, aged 69, in his hometown of Recife, Pernambuco.
