= Brega pop =

Brazilian music genre

Calypso
- Stylistic origins: Brega; Calipso; Siriá; Lambada; Carimbó; Guitarrada; Ska; Reggae
- Cultural origins: 1990s Belém do Pará, Brazil
- Typical instruments: Guitar; vocals; bass guitar; Keys; Sax; Drums; Trumpet; Percussion instrument; Brass instrument

Subgenres
- Tecnobrega

Calypso, Brega Calypso or just Brega-pop is a musical genre that emerged in the Brazilian city of Belém (state of Pará), by mixing elements of Pará's regional genres such as lambada, carimbó, guitarrada, siriá, with international music from Caribbean countries, such as calypso, ska, reggae. It developed in the 1990s at concerts and dances in nightclubs on the outskirts of town and through street vendors promoting the production of small local/independent musicians.

It was created by musicians from the state of Pará in the city of Belém, who decided to combine the traditional regional brega with other rhythms from Caribbean music such as calypso, from which point the name of this fusion also became calypso.

== History ==
=== Background ===
Brega was a term used pejoratively to designate popular romantic music of low quality and with dramatic exaggerations (love disappointments) or naivety; with samba-canção, bolero and jovem-guarda linked to it.

The musical origin of "brega" is not known for sure, but singer Vicente Celestino (1894-1968) in the 1930s is considered to be one of the precursors of brega as a dramatic musical genre, followed by: Orlando Dias, Carlos Alberto and Cauby Peixoto.

During the 1960s, the romantic music of artists was basically from the lower classes and came to be considered tacky and inelegant. This was especially reinforced by the transformations experienced by the country's popular music in that period, with the emergence of stylistic innovations on the music scene that appealed mainly to young people in urban areas. On the one hand, a generation emerged from the university-educated middle classes that would consolidate, in the following decade, under the acronym MPB, no less than "Brazilian popular music". On the other, the Tropicália movement - inspired by avant-garde artistic currents and national and foreign pop culture and by traditional manifestations of Brazilian culture and radical aesthetic innovations - and the Iê-iê-iê movement - which led the way for foreign rock'n'roll, giving it a national dressing, and became a major behavioral and fashion phenomenon.

And it was the Jovem Guarda that paved the way for new artists who challenged the standards of good taste of the Brazilian middle class in the following decade, since some of the artists who had a connection with the movement would become popular "tacky" singers in the following decade. This was the case, for example, with Reginaldo Rossi, from Pernambuco, who led the band The Silver Jets.

But it was in the North and Northeast that "brega" resisted and consolidated itself as a major musical force. Although radio stations and major record labels began to ignore its existence, "brega" artists continued to produce and assimilate new influences. Even with limited investment capital and technical support, these musicians maintained a significant audience in the urban peripheries of these regions, outside the cultural coverage of the hegemonic media." Belém do Pará became the main reference in the consolidation of "brega" as a musical style in the country. Initially restricted to circuits of dances and concerts - called "bregões" - in nightclubs on the outskirts of Belém, the scene acquired great regional proportions with the "aparelhagens" (large, powerful professional sound systems) of the big popular parties, attended by thousands of people, usually characterized by music typical of the northern region.

=== 1990's ===
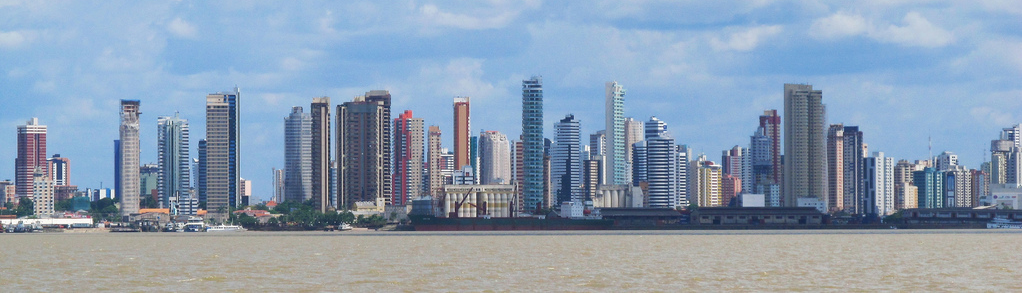
Calypso from Pará originated in the city of Belém.

With the rise of brega in the state of Pará in the 1990s, the rhythm began to increase on the outskirts of Pará. As a result, Pará musicians quickly came up with the idea of fusing brega with the state's traditional rhythms such as lambada, carimbó, guitarrada, and siriá, as well as Caribbean rhythms such as calypso from Trinidad and Tobago and ska and reggae from Jamaica, as well as Caribbean rhythms such as calypso from Trinidad and Tobago and ska and reggae from Jamaica, which contained lyrics that criticized the colonialism of the time. These Caribbean styles arrived in Pará across the state border with the Guianas. The mixture of these new sounds with Pará's brega influenced a new strand called "brega pop" or "brega Calypso", which also came to be called Calypso, just like Caribbean's original. The name "brega pop" was coined by broadcasters Jorge Reis, Rosenildo Franco, and Marquinho Pinheiro, who noticed a more pop feel to this new genre compared to the old brega. With lyrics that still generally dealt with disillusionment, abusive relationships, and love betrayals, typical of brega lyrics - although often veering into explicit eroticization, Pará's "calypso" distanced itself from its main strand, as it was characterized by a faster rhythm, with an emphasis on the chord of the guitars, brass instruments and a strong sonic weight in the drums. Various music producers, such as Dedê Borges, Hélio Silva, Manoel Cordeiro, Cléo Pinheiro, Tonny Brasil and Cláudio Lemos, produced countless artists who were very successful, expanding "Brega Pop" throughout the North and Northeast!

In Pará, brega pop or brega Calypso soon began to be included in new songs by singers such as Wanderley Andrade, Banda Sayonara, Edílson Moreno, Adilson Ribeiro, Banda Quero Mais, Mário Senna, Alberto Moreno, Nelsinho Rodrigues, Bruce Waldo, Kim Marques, and others. In the 1990s, the crisis in the record industry and technological advances transformed the brega music market. Outside the scope of the national recording industry, the musical production of "calypso" from Pará was distributed directly by street vendors and camelôs, consolidating an alternative market. The rhythm quickly spread to other states in the north of Brazil. At the end of the decade, music producer and guitarist Cledivan Almeida Farias, known as Ximbinha, became one of the main producers of the calypso style in the whole of Pará, featuring his guitar on most of the CDs by artists on the Pará scene at the time. In 1999, together with his wife at the time, the singer Joelma Mendes, Ximbinha formed the greatest national exponent of the movement that become Banda Calypso.

=== 2000's ===
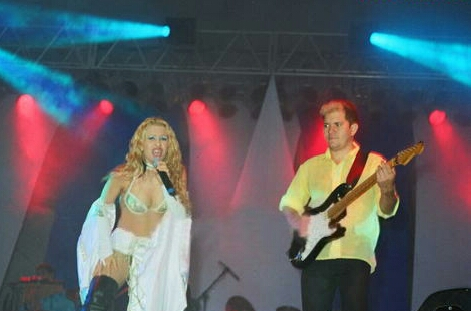
Banda Calypso was the biggest exponent of the style in the decade.

The 2000s were marked by the popularization of calypso throughout Brazil. With the creation of Banda Calypso - the band mainly responsible for spreading the style - the rhythm began to spread to other Brazilian states in the early 2000s.In the north-east of Brazil, Banda Calypso was quickly accepted for its musicality. Their songs with a romantic and dance appeal soon became a real fever throughout the country. Although it developed in the parallel market of the peripheries, in this decade "brega pop" has become an extremely lucrative business and has regained space in local media throughout the country, with a presence on the programming of the big commercial radio stations. With the success of Banda Calypso, in 2001 onwards, several bands with the same sound and/or the same name calypso began to appear, which soon also began to become popular throughout Brazil, such as - Companhia do Calypso, Planeta Calypso, Furacão do Calypso, Banda da Loirinha and Banda Kassikó.

These bands still had lyrics that were generally romantic, although often sensual, most of them were accompanied by a group of vocalists with more than one singer, almost always a blonde, who sang and danced on a stage surrounded by dancers who reproduced marked choreographies, which generally portrayed in a dancing way what was sung in the lyrics. These groups have gained national prominence in all regions of Brazil, with bands of this style appearing on the main national television programs, recording DVDs with large structures, and their managers making a lot of money.

=== 2010's ===
With the popularization of the tecnobrega style (techno + brega), the result of the fusion of brega with electronic music styles, during the 2010s, calypso ceased to be preferred by the state's bands, singers and artists, who preferred to record what was hot at the time, with calypso losing many of its representatives and losing much of the popularity it had enjoyed in the previous decade.

With the end of Banda Calypso and the dissolution of many other calypso bands, the singer Joelma Mendes continued to record calypso songs in her solo career. Her ex-husband, the musician Ximbinha, formed a new calypso band called XCalypso.

== See also ==
- Calypso music
- Brega (music)
- Tecno brega
