= Carimbó =

Brazilian dance

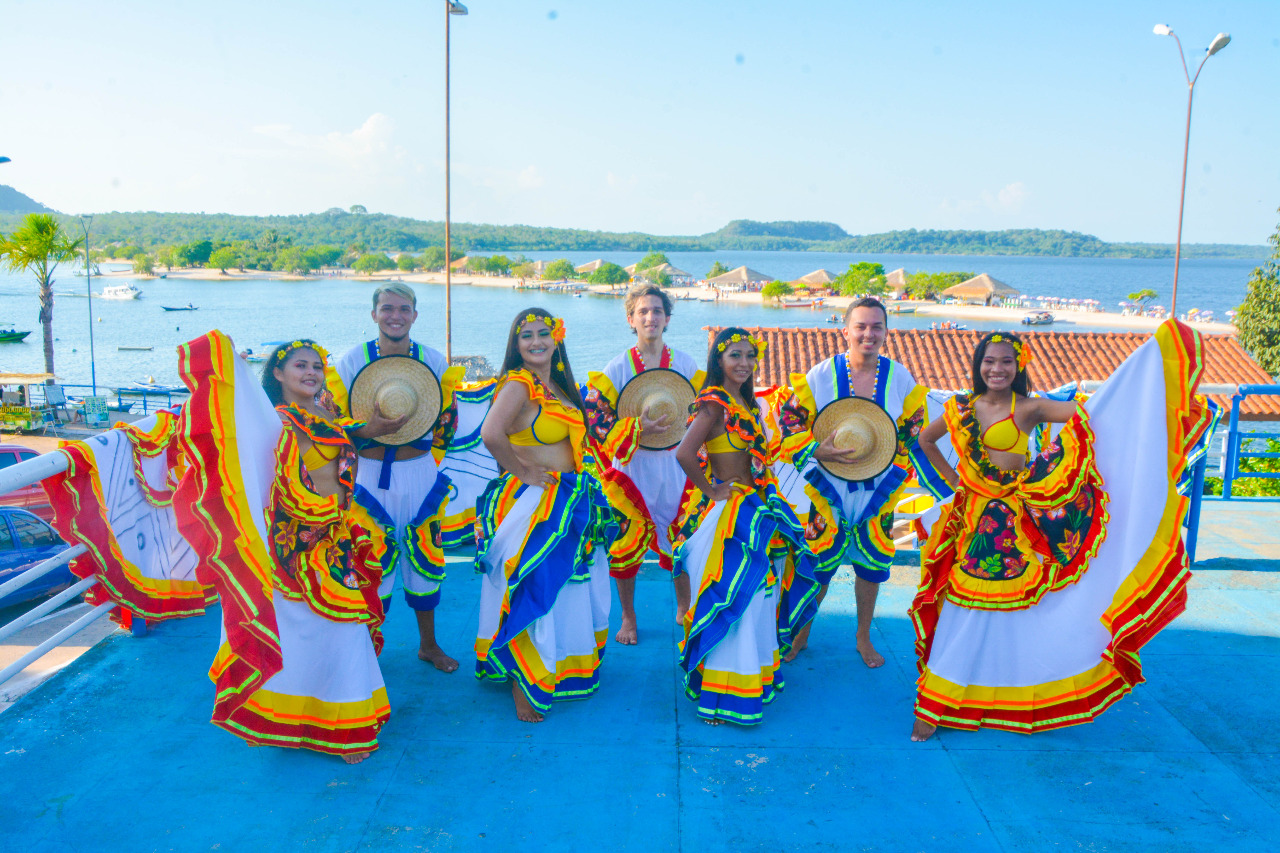
Group of Carimbó dancers.

Carimbó is a Brazilian dance, a type of percussion instrument, and a genre of music. It originated in the 17th century in the northern region of Brazil. The cultural hub of the dance is in the state of Pará, around the island of Marajó, in the capital city of Belém. The dance is named after the drum that accompanies it, which is derived from the Tupi word Korimbó, translating to "wood that produces sound".

== History ==
It was born of Afro-Brazilians, who were brought to Pará by the Portuguese as early as 1682, and influenced by Portuguese and native Amazonian traditions. Each culture affected an aspect of the dance and its music:

- African syncopated rhythms, acceleration of rhythm, and the molejo, or sway, of the dance.
- Indigenous Amazonians circular dancing and use of maracas.
- Portuguese/Iberian finger snapping gestures, melodic patterns, and the use of suits and ties for men.

The dance is performed during saint feast days, and is heavily associated with Saint Benedict, who is sometimes called the "saint of Carimbó". It is also a centerpiece of entrudo, festivities held at the end of a harvest or a day of field work.

It is historically classified into three geographical types:

- praieiro: coastal region.
- pastoril: Marajó ranching fields.
- agrícola: agricultural and Amazonas.

In 2014, after years of campaigns, Carimbó was officially registered as an "Intangible Cultural Heritage of Brazil" by IPHAN, due to its national and regional importance in Brazil and Pará.

== Dance ==
Carimbó, the dance, is loose and sensual, involving only side-to-side movements and many spins and hip movements by the female dancer, who typically wears a rounded skirt. The music is mainly to the beat of Carimbó drums. In this dance, a woman throws her handkerchief on the floor, and her male partner attempts to retrieve it using his mouth alone. Over time, the dance changed, as did the music itself. It was influenced by the Caribbean (for example, Zouk and Merengue styles) and French/Spanish dance styles of the Caribbean, especially Cumbia from Colombia.

== Carimbó Drum ==
The Carimbó drum was originally only the primary percussion instrument used in batuques, meaning drumming, a traditional form of Afro-Brazilian percussion. The drummer, or batedor, sits on the body of the drum, which is often fitted with a wooden support, and strikes it with both hands.

It is crafted by artisans called armadores, and is approximately 1m tall and 30 cm wide, and made of a hollow trunk of wood, thinned by fire, and covered with an animal hide. The shell of the drum is usually crafted from endemic trees such as siriubeira (mangrove), ipê, copiúba, or ingazeiro. Armadores learn the craft through self-study or dreams, and the wood is cut during the waning moon and low-tide to avoid cracking. The hide for the head of the drum is typically crafted from a bull, deer, or capybara. In Marajó, historical accounts indicate that some people used anaconda skin.

== In popular culture ==
The dance and its music were woven into daily life, and with the advent of the radio, became increasingly popularized. Two distinct forms of Carimbó emerged: Carimbó de Raiz (Carimbó of the Root), or Pau e Corda (Stick and String), which relies on traditional, artisanal instruments. Carimbó Estilizado (Stylized Carimbó) makes use of modern instruments, influenced by North American jazz. Pinduca, known as the "King of Carimbó", is a central figure in the modernization of Carimbó.

The style survives today, with Caribbean radio stations in the northern states of Brazil, such as Amapá, playing the music. The Carimbó style has formed the basis of some new rhythms like the Sirimbó, the Lari Lari, and the Lambada. The Lambada, which became an international phenomenon around 1989 and 1990, specifically arose from an appropriation of a popular rhythm that was played in Belém. Fafá de Belém, a singer from the 1970s, is associated with the popular style.

In the 21st century, Carimbó has been reclaimed as a tool of social activism and community outreach. Groups like Sereia do Mar (Mermaid of the Sea) use the dance to promote matriarchal authority and knowledge among women. Other groups like Cobra Venenosa (Venonomous Snake) use the genre to fight for LGBTQ+ rights.
