= Lambada (dance) =

Brazilian dance

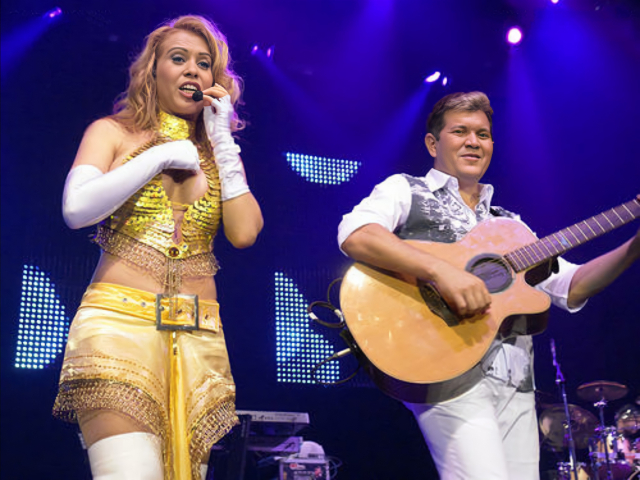
The Banda Calypso in 2006

Lambada (Brazilian Portuguese pronunciation) is a dance from the state of Pará in Brazil. The dance briefly became internationally popular in the 1980s, especially in the Philippines, Latin America and Caribbean countries. It has adopted aspects of dances such as maxixe, carimbó, forró, salsa, merengue, and samba.

Lambada is generally a partner dance. The dancers generally dance with arched legs, with the steps being from side to side, turning or even swaying, and in its original form never front to back, with a pronounced movement of the hips. At the time when the dance became popular, short skirts for women were in fashion and men wore long trousers, and the dance has become associated with such clothing, especially for women wearing short skirts that swirl up when the woman spins around, typically revealing 90s-style thong underwear.

== Origins ==
=== Maxixe ===
The association of Lambada and the idea of 'dirty dancing' became quite extensive. The appellative "forbidden dance" was and is often ascribed to the Lambada. This was largely due to its links to Maxixe, a dance of the early 1920s, because of its spicy lyrics and close contact with the dance partner. This idea was further perpetuated by the 1990 movies Lambada and The Forbidden Dance, and the short skirts, typical for the Lambada dance, that were in fashion around 1988.

Lambada has many links with Maxixe and also with Forro. They have many figures in common. For example:

- Balão apagado, a figure in which the lady rotates her head while it hangs loose.
- Peão (also called boneca or toy doll), a figure in which the lady swings her head from side to side.

=== Carimbó ===
From the time that Brazil was a Portuguese colony, Carimbó was a common dance in the northern part of the country. Carimbó was a loose and very sensual dance which involved many spins by the female dancer, who typically wore a rounded skirt. The music was mainly to the beat of drums made of trunks of wood, thinned by fire.

Carimbó involved only side to side movements and many spins and hip movement, which has influenced lambada movements.

=== Etymology ===
After a while, a local radio station from Belém (Pará's capital city) started to call this new type of music "the strong-beated rhythm" and "the rhythms of lambada". The term "lambada" had a strong appeal and began to be associated with the new emerging face of an old dancing style.

The word lambada means "strong slap" or "hit" in Portuguese. However, as a dance form, lambada is of obscure etymology. In Portuguese it may refer to the wave-like motion of a whip. This flowing wave motion is reproduced by the dancers' bodies, and is one of the main elements that distinguish Lambada from other Latin dances.

=== Two-beat dance style ===
Around 1983, the Carimbó dance started again to be danced in couples, in a 2-beat style, something very close to Merengue, but with more spins.

=== Music ===
Aurino Quirino Gonçalves, or simply Pinduca, is a Brazilian musician and singer in the state of Pará, Brazil, where it is strongly believed he is the true father of the lambada music.

Pinduca is a musician and composer of mainly Carimbó. He is the singer and composer of the "King of Carimbó" (as it is affectionately known) and he created rhythms, such as: Sirimbó, Lári-Lári, Lambada and Lamgode. In 1976, he launched a song entitled Lambada (Sambão), track number 6 of the LP No embalo of carimbó and sirimbó vol. 5. It is the first Brazilian recording of a song under the label of Lambada.

Some support the version that the guitarist and composer Master Vieira, the inventor of the guitarrada, would also be the creator of the Lambada music. His first official disc, Lambada of Quebradas, was recorded in 1976 but officially launched two years later, in 1978.

In the late 1980s, the fusion between the metallic and electronic music from Caribbean brought again a new face to the Carimbó. This style started to be played throughout north-eastern Brazil (a place well known for its tourist approach), although this new Carimbó went with the name of Lambada.

== Bahia ==
=== Four-beat dance style ===
The Lambada spread along the coast until it reached Bahia (the elder Brazilian state) where it was influenced by the Forró, an old Brazilian style of dance which also had a strong beat. It became a four-beat dancing style, which was distinctive from the original Carimbó.

Although the music of lambada began in Pará, the dance of Lambada did not gain a recognizable form until the music reached Porto Seguro in Bahia. In Pará, people moved to what was then a new beat by adapting dance styles that were familiar at that time such as forró, cumbia, carimbó, maxixe and merengue. But it was in the Boca da Barra beach cabana that the dance of lambada began to acquire a specific form - first as a very simple stepping in place in a close partner embrace, and quickly becoming more and more complex. Leaders in that community included the brothers Braz and Didi Dos Santos and Rebeca Lang, who won many lambada competitions and created steps that are still danced today in all Lambada styles.

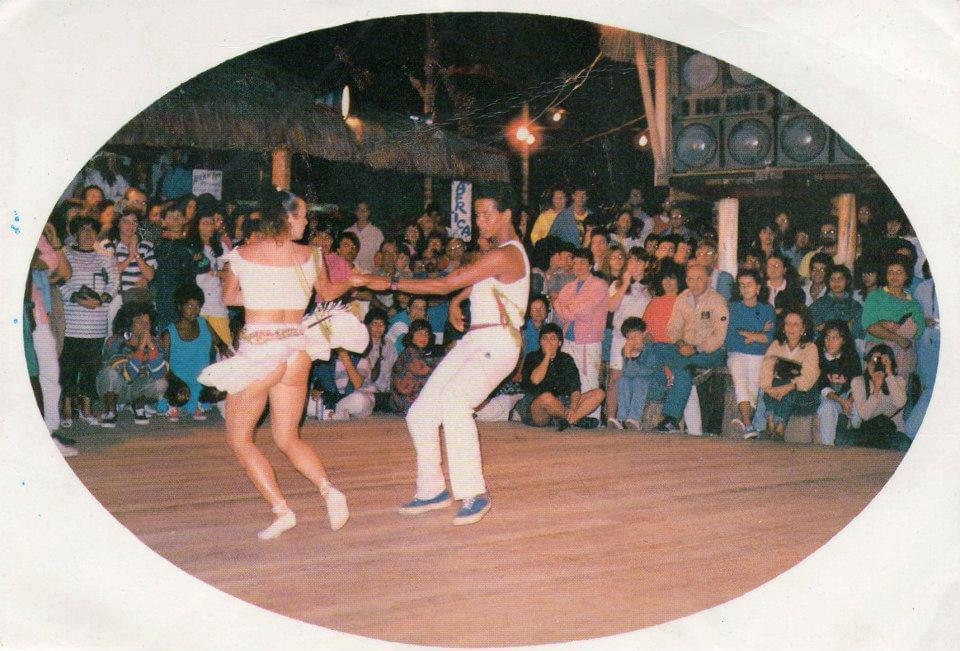
Braz Dos Santos and partner Isabel winning the ‘campeão dos campeões’ (Champion of Champions) competition at Boca da Barra

This form of Lambada was danced with arched legs, with the steps being from one side to the other, and never from front to back. At the time short skirts for girls were in fashion and men wore long trousers, and the dance became especially associated with girls wearing short skirts. This association has continued until today, and the tradition is common in some places, such as the Lambar night club of São Paulo.

=== Carnival ===
During the 1980s, the Carnival in Bahia was growing in popularity, and every summer a new kind of dance arose, only to disappear during the year after the tourists had left, with another dancing style and rhythm arising the following summer. A few years before the Lambada, there was the Fricote and the Ti-Ti-Ti among others dances, all of which disappeared never to be remembered again.

Among with the "Trio-eletricos" (big movable trucks covered with speakers, on top of which musicians would play during the Carnival in Bahia), in 1988 the Lambada started to become popular in Bahia, and established itself in the city of Porto Seguro. Still, in this first boom of the Lambada, the economically developed south-east region of Brazil despised the various rhythms which came from Bahia on a regular basis, and which were believed to be only summer hits.

Although it was recognized as a summer hit, the Lambada was not yet a true worldwide success. Many of the first lambaterias (a place to dance Lambada) which opened in 1988 couldn't survive the low tourism of the winter season, and closed a few months later.

== Musicians ==
Prior to Kaoma's 1989 cover of the Los Kjarkas song "Llorando se fue", dozens of groups and several singers had already performed the song using a dance rhythm, such as in 1984 with Cuarteto Continental, Sexteto Internacional, and Puerto Rican singer Wilkins. Argentine singer Juan "Corazón" Ramón in 1985 and Brazilian singer-songwriter Márcia Ferreira, who wrote the translation in Portuguese as "Chorando se foi", in 1986 were also widely successful with their covers. Other popular dance music groups, Tropicalisimo Apache from Mexico and Los Hermanos Rosario from the Dominican Republic covered the song in 1988. The song continues to be covered to this day; for example: Pastor López, Beto Barbosa, Manezinho do Sax, while others were increasing their careers, as was the case with Sidney Magal, Sandy e Júnior, Fafá de Belém, Gretchen and the group Trem da Alegria.

=== Kaoma's song "Lambada" ===
In 1988, French entrepreneur, Olivier Lamotte d'Incamps (aka Olivier Lorsac), visited Porto Seguro, Brazil and discovered locals dancing the tightly syncopated lambada to a melody that turned out to be Bolivian. D'Incamps became involved in the lambada dance craze, largely by promoting a European tour of Kaoma, a band formed with several musicians from the Senegalese group Touré Kunda. To display the dance in Europe, he chose a team of the best dancers at the Boca Da Barra (a dance cabana on the beach in Porto Seguro where lambada dancers refined and developed the style and form of the dance). Most notable among these young dancers chosen for the Kaoma company was Braz Dos Santos, who has become the most celebrated lambada dancer in the world today (recipient of the 2015 Lifetime Achievement Award's "World’s Best LambaZouk Performer" at the Los Angeles Zouk Festival), and his brother Didi Dos Santos. After Olivier Lamotte d'Incamps bought the musical rights to over 400 lambada songs with Jean Georgakarakos, he took the dancers back to France and created the Kaoma band. They were part of lambada's worldwide known style, reaching all the way to Japan and Vietnam, where the dance is still popular.

The French group Kaoma recorded a number one worldwide summer hit "Lambada", sung in Portuguese by the brazilian singer Loalwa Braz, which sold 5 million singles in 1989. The song peaked at #46 in the United States in 1990 on the Billboard Hot 100 chart. In Portuguese, the "Lambada" song is called "Chorando se foi", meaning In tears they went.

In the music video, there were two young children, named Chico and Roberta, performing the lambada dance. They shortly thereafter started their own musical career. Other music videos featured Loalwa Braz, Braz Dos Santos, Didi Dos Santos, and other dancers from the Kaoma European Tour. These videos were broadcast extensively worldwide and, capturing the imagination of audiences who were attracted to the sight of beautiful young people dancing sensuously in the sun, greatly boosted music sales.

The "Lambada" song was actually an unauthorized translation of the 1981 song "Llorando se fue" (meaning: In tears he/she left), by the Bolivian group Los Kjarkas. Also, the dance arrangements were an identical cover from the version of "Llorando se fue" recorded by the Peruvian group Cuarteto Continental and produced by Alberto Maravi. Kaoma's "Lambada" was also a direct cover of Márcia Ferreira's legally authorized Portuguese-translated version of "Llorando se fue". Márcia Ferreira and José Ari wrote and adapted Los Kjarkas' song into Portuguese using an upbeat lambada rhythm as "Chorando se foi", which was released on Ferreira's third album in 1986. Due to Kaoma's clear act of plagiarism and release of their single without Los Kjarkas' permission, Los Kjarkas successfully sued Kaoma. Now Kaoma's "Lambada" song is credited to the Hermosa brothers (authors), Márcia Ferreira (translation), José Ari (translation), and Alberto Maraví (original producer).

== Evolution ==
=== Early interpretations ===
With world repercussion, the dance reached far distortions. Due to a lack of fine Lambada dancers to make films and shows, most professional dancers started changing the way it was danced. Rock spins and steps were added, like those from Jive and East Coast Swing. Also some acrobatic movements became more commonplace.

In contrast, Lambada contests at "Lambateria UM" (a place of Lambada) eliminated contestants if ever they became separated during the dance.

=== Different styles of music ===
After 1994 the Brazilian music style (also called Lambada), which gave birth to the dance, started to fade away, and the dancers began to use other musical sources to continue practicing the Lambada dance. Among these rhythms were the Flamenco Rumba (such as from the Gipsy Kings) and some Arabian music. Some very resistant dancers started to use other music styles to keep on dancing Lambada. Many of the Caribbean music like Soca, Merengue, Salsa, and Zouk were used to dance the Lambada, and so were traditional Brazilian music styles like samba and forró. Finally the dance recovered most of its original way and style, with less acrobatic moves, smoother, intimate and closer contact. Some people like Adílio Porto, Israel Szerman and Luís Florião (Brazilian teachers) regret that nowadays the dance changed its name to Zouk-Lambada in most parts of Brazil. This is mainly because of its musical orphanage.

=== Brazilian Zouk ===
Brazilian Zouk is a group of closely related dance styles based on or evolved from the lambada dance style and is typically danced to zouk music or other music containing the zouk beat. The name Brazilian Zouk is used to distinguish the dance from the Caribbean Zouk dance style, which is historically related to, but very different from the Lambada dance style. The three lines of Brazilian Zouk are LambaZouk, traditional (or Rio) Zouk and Zouk of different styles.

== Films ==
- Lambada (1990) (Lambada: Set the Night on Fire)
- The Forbidden Dance (1990) (Lambada - The Forbidden Dance/The Forbidden Dance is Lambada)
- Lambada (Brazilian/Italian film) (1990) (Rhythm and Passion)
