= Spain in the Eurovision Song Contest 2017 =

- Eurovision Song Contest 2017
- Participating broadcaster: Radiotelevisión Española (RTVE)
- Country: Spain
- Selection process: Objetivo Eurovisión 2017
- Selection date: 11 February 2017

Competing entry
- Song: "Do It for Your Lover"
- Artist: Manel Navarro
- Songwriters: Manel Navarro; Antonio Rayo "Rayito"

Placement
- Final result: 26th, 5 points

Participation chronology

Spain was represented at the Eurovision Song Contest 2017 with the song "Do It for Your Lover", written by Manel Navarro and Antonio Rayo "Rayito", and performed by Manel Navarro himself. The Spanish participating broadcaster, Radiotelevisión Española (RTVE), organised the national final Objetivo Eurovisión 2017 in order to select its entry for the contest. Six artists and songs, one of which was selected through the wildcard round Eurocasting, competed in the televised show where an in-studio jury and a public vote selected "Do It for Your Lover" performed by Manel Navarro as the winner.

As a member of the "Big Five", Spain automatically qualified to compete in the final of the Eurovision Song Contest. Performing in position 16, Spain placed twenty-sixth (last) out of the 26 participating countries with 5 points.

== Background ==
Prior to the 2017 contest, Televisión Española (TVE) until 2006, and Radiotelevisión Española (RTVE) since 2007, had participated in the Eurovision Song Contest representing Spain fifty-six times since TVE's first entry in 1961. They have won the contest on two occasions: in 1968 with the song "La, la, la" performed by Massiel and in 1969 with the song "Vivo cantando" performed by Salomé, the latter having won in a four-way tie with France, the Netherlands, and the United Kingdom. They have also finished second four times, with "En un mundo nuevo" by Karina in 1971, "Eres tú" by Mocedades in 1973, "Su canción" by Betty Missiego in 1979, and "Vuelve conmigo" by Anabel Conde in 1995. In 2016, RTVE placed twenty-second with the song "Say Yay!" performed by Barei.

As part of its duties as participating broadcaster, RTVE organises the selection of its entry in the Eurovision Song Contest and broadcasts the event in the country. RTVE confirmed its intentions to participate at the 2017 contest on 14 September 2016. In 2016, RTVE organised the national final Objetivo Eurovisión featuring a competition among several artists and songs to select both the artist and song that would represent Spain, a procedure which was continued for its 2017 entry.

== Before Eurovision ==
=== Eurocasting ===
Eurocasting was the wildcard round of the national final organised by RTVE that selected its entry for the Eurovision Song Contest 2017. A submission period was open from 27 October 2016 until 27 November 2016, and 392 entries were received at the conclusion of the submission period. Professionals at RTVE Digital, the digital branch of the broadcaster, evaluated the entries received and selected thirty entries. The selected entries were revealed via RTVE's official website on 1 December 2016 and among the competing artists was Javi Soleil who represented Spain in 2007 as part of D'Nash.

Artist	Song	Songwriter(s)
Alicia Nurho Band	"Under the Light"	Alicia García Garcés
Ander and Rossi	"Ahora soy yo"	Andersón José Peña; Rosendo Sánchez
Brequette	"No Enemy"	Brequette Shana; Bárbara Reyzábal; Rubén Villanueva
Carmel	"Waiting for a Better End"	Carmen Senra; Roel García Serrano
Dani J	"Sin ti"	Daniel Retamosa Jaenes; David Carmona
Detergente Líquido	"131 bpm"	Alberto Rodway Chamorro
E-Twins	"Chica del vestido rojo"	David Espinosa García; Víctor Espinosa García
Ektor Pan	"Perfect Storm"	Héctor Panedas; Florin Boncutiu
Fruela	"Live It Up"	Ander Pérez; Javi Reina; Albert Rousseau; Jeremy Warder; Fruela Fuente
Gio	"Vuelve a mí"	Sergio Bermejo Romero
Íñigo	"Hoy es por mí"	Íñigo Etayo; Tomás Virgós
Iranzo Iranzinix	"Bye te digo"	Iranzo Iranzinix
Ivet Vidal	"Do You Want Me"	Ivet Vidal; Melissa Erpen; Christian Gulino; Igor Fejzula
Javi Soleil	"Alas mojadas"	Javi Soleil; Juan Guevara
Javián	"No somos héroes"	Javián; José Abraham; Juanma Leal
Jon Josdi	"Dónde estabas tú"	Jon Josdi
LeKlein	"Ouch!!"	David Ascanio; Vanesa Cortés; Albert Neve; Abel Ramos
Lem Baquero	"Hard to Love You"	Jake Boncuitiu
Milena Brody	"Momento"	Milena Brody
Nicky Triphook	"Daddy's Little Girl"	Nicolás González Triphook
Nieves Hidalgo	"Esclava"	Rafael Artesero
Nito	"Luna"	Nito Solsona; Chus Santana
Padre Damián	"Thousand Suns"	Andreas Öhrn; Sebastian Thoth
Paradise Phantoms	"Madrifornia"	Marcos Miranda
Pedro Elipe	"Del dolor"	Pedro Elipe
Rebeca Moss	"Volveré por ti"	Rebeca Moss; Luis Rodríguez
Romy Low	"In Love"	Romy Low; Xasqui Ten
Shannel	"Bailando"	David Villas
Stvrkid feat. Silence of the Wolves	"Sparkling Lights"	Jose Coll; Angela Carpio; Julio Marqués Emés
Wildback	"Noches de verano"	Pol Sancho; Edu Brun; Eudald Reixach

==== Selection ====
In the first stage, Internet users had between 2 and 12 December 2016 to vote for their favourite song on RTVE's official website. Votes from 55,264 users were received at the conclusion of the voting, and the top ten entries that qualified for the next stage were announced on 15 December 2016 on the special webcast show Spain Calling, presented by Irene Mahía and Paloma G. Quirós and broadcast on RTVE's official website. In the second stage, a seven-member jury evaluated the ten entries and selected three entries for the final stage which were announced on 20 December 2016 on Spain Calling. The members of the jury were Juan Magán (jury chairperson, singer-songwriter and music producer), Sheila Blanco (singer-songwriter and vocal coach), Sebas E. Alonso (journalist and co-director of Jenesaispop), David Feito (singer-songwriter and musician, represented Spain in 2013 as part of El Sueño de Morfeo), Pepe Herrero (composer and conductor), Guille Milkyway (singer-songwriter and producer, creator and frontman of La Casa Azul) and Pascual Osa (composer and conductor).

First stage – 15 December 2016
Artist	Song	Percentage	Place	Result
Alicia Nurho Band	"Under the Light"	3.25%	15	—N/a
Brequette	"No Enemy"	4.59%	3	Advanced
Dani J	"Sin ti"	3.37%	13	—N/a
E-Twins	"Chica del vestido rojo"	2.86%	25	—N/a
Fruela	"Live It Up"	3.72%	6	Advanced
Íñigo	"Hoy es por mí"	2.91%	23	—N/a
Ivet Vidal	"Do You Want Me"	3.07%	20	—N/a
Javián	"No somos héroes"	4.67%	2	Advanced
LeKlein	"Ouch!!"	4.11%	4	Advanced
Milena Brody	"Momento"	2.89%	24	—N/a
Nieves Hidalgo	"Esclava"	3.66%	8	Advanced
Padre Damián	"Thousand Suns"	2.66%	26	—N/a
Pedro Elipe	"Del dolor"	3.87%	5	Advanced
Romy Low	"In Love"	3.72%	7	Advanced
Stvrkid feat. Silence of the Wolves	"Sparkling Lights"	3.42%	12	—N/a
Ander and Rossi	"Ahora soy yo"	2.98%	22	—N/a
Carmel	"Waiting for a Better End"	3.19%	18	—N/a
Detergente Líquido	"131 bpm"	2.53%	28	—N/a
Ektor Pan	"Perfect Storm"	3.01%	21	—N/a
Gio	"Vuelve a mí"	3.37%	14	—N/a
Iranzo Iranzinix	"Bye te digo"	2.32%	30	—N/a
Javi Soleil	"Alas mojadas"	3.43%	11	—N/a
Jon Josdi	"Dónde estabas tú"	2.41%	29	—N/a
Lem Baquero	"Hard to Love You"	3.10%	19	—N/a
Nicky Triphook	"Daddy's Little Girl"	3.59%	9	Advanced
Nito	"Luna"	4.81%	1	Advanced
Paradise Phantoms	"Madrifornia"	3.20%	17	—N/a
Rebeca Moss	"Volveré por ti"	3.46%	10	Advanced
Shannel	"Bailando"	3.24%	16	—N/a
Wildback	"Noches de verano"	2.62%	27	—N/a

Second stage – 20 December 2016
Artist	Song	Jurors							Total	Place	Result
Artist	Song	1	2	3	4	5	6	7	Total	Place	Result
Brequette	"No Enemy"	2	1	1	2				6	4	—N/a
Fruela	"Live It Up"	3	2		3				8	2	Advanced
Javián	"No somos héroes"			3	1			3	7	3	Advanced
LeKlein	"Ouch!!"	1	3			2	3		9	1	Advanced
Nieves Hidalgo	"Esclava"			2					2	6	—N/a
Pedro Elipe	"Del dolor"							2	2	6	—N/a
Romy Low	"In Love"					1			1	8	—N/a
Nicky Triphook	"Daddy's Little Girl"					3	2	1	6	4	—N/a
Nito	"Luna"								0	10	—N/a
Rebeca Moss	"Volveré por ti"						1		1	8	—N/a

==== Concert show ====
The final stage took place in the form of a webcast concert show on 12 January 2017 at the Ciudad de la Imagen in Pozuelo de Alarcón (Madrid), hosted by Irene Mahía and Paloma G. Quirós and broadcast on RTVE's official website. The three entries that qualified from the second stage competed and "Ouch!!" performed by LeKlein qualified for the national final exclusively through a public vote via RTVE's official website and Eurovision app. More than 7,000 votes were received, with a majority coming from the app. In addition to the performances of the competing entries, guest performers included David Rees and former Eurovision contestant Azúcar Moreno which represented Spain in 1990. The concert show was watched by more than 20,000 unique users, with the hashtag #Eurocastingfinal becoming the #1 worldwide trending topic on social media.

Concert show – 12 January 2017
R/O	Artist	Song	Percentage	Place	Result
1	Javián	"No somos héroes"	21.7%	2	—N/a
2	Fruela	"Live It Up"	15.0%	3	—N/a
3	LeKlein	"Ouch!!"	63.3%	1	Qualified

=== Objetivo Eurovisión 2017 ===
Objetivo Eurovisión 2017 was the national final organised by RTVE that took place on 11 February 2017 at the VAV studios in Leganés (Madrid), hosted by Jaime Cantizano. The show was broadcast on La 1 as well as online via RTVE's official website rtve.es. Six artists and songs competed with the winner being decided upon through a combination of public televoting and an in-studio expert jury. The national final was watched by 1.449 million viewers in Spain with a market share of 8.9%.

The three members of the in-studio jury that evaluated the entries during the final were:

- Xavi Martínez – Radio program director and presenter at Los 40
- Javier Cárdenas – Radio program director and presenter at Europa FM, television program director and host at La 1
- Virginia Díaz – Radio program director and presenter at Radio 3, television program director and presenter at La 2

==== Competing entries ====
The six competing acts were announced on 12 January 2017 during the concert show of Eurocasting. One of the artists, LeKlein, was selected through Eurocasting, while the remaining five artists were professional and established acts invited by RTVE for the national final.

Artist	Song	Songwriter(s)
LeKlein	"Ouch!!"	David Ascanio, Vanesa Cortés, Albert Neve, Abel Ramos
Maika	"Momento crítico"	Rafael Artesero, José Juan Santana
Manel Navarro	"Do It for Your Lover"	Manel Navarro, Antonio Rayo "Rayito"
Mario Jefferson	"Spin My Head"	Chris Wahle
Mirela	"Contigo"	Tony Sánchez-Ohlsson, Isaac Luke, Ander Pérez
Paula Rojo	"Lo que nunca fue"	Paula Rojo, Álvaro Bárcena

==== Final ====
The televised final took place on 11 February 2017. The running order for the six participating entries was announced on 2 February 2017. In addition to the performances of the competing entries, guest performers included Roko, Edu Soto and former Eurovision contestants Karina, David Civera, and Barei which represented Spain in 1971, 2001, and 2016, respectively. The winner, "Do It for Your Lover" performed by Manel Navarro, was selected through the combination of the votes of an in-studio jury (50%) and a public vote via telephone, SMS and RTVE's official Eurovision app (50%). Since Manel Navarro and Mirela were tied at 58 points, a jury tie-break was held which declared Navarro as the winner.

Final – 11 February 2017
R/O	Artist	Song	Jury	Televote					Total	Place
R/O	Artist	Song	Jury	Phone	SMS	App	Total	Points	Total	Place
1	Manel Navarro	"Do It for Your Lover"	34	890	1,095	124	2,109	24	58	1
2	LeKlein	"Ouch!!"	22	1,471	1,105	136	2,712	30	52	3
3	Paula Rojo	"Lo que nunca fue"	21	653	262	20	935	18	39	6
4	Mario Jefferson	"Spin My Head"	25	291	240	4	535	15	40	5
5	Maika	"Momento crítico"	20	932	844	41	1,817	21	41	4
6	Mirela	"Contigo"	22	2,523	1,731	225	4,479	36	58	2

Detailed Jury Votes
R/O	Song	X. Martínez	J. Cárdenas	V. Díaz	Total
1	"Do It for Your Lover"	12	10	12	34
2	"Ouch!!"	7	7	8	22
3	"Lo que nunca fue"	8	6	7	21
4	"Spin My Head"	10	5	10	25
5	"Momento crítico"	6	8	6	20
6	"Contigo"	5	12	5	22

Detailed Jury Votes (Tie-break)
Song	X. Martínez	J. Cárdenas	V. Díaz	Total
"Contigo"		X		1
"Do It for Your Lover"	X		X	2

==== Controversy ====
During the tie-break voting round of Objetivo Eurovisión 2017, when the jury selected Manel Navarro over the public vote's favourite Mirela, and before his reprise performance, loud boos and accusations of rigging could be heard, which resulted in uneasy moments: Manel Navarro responded with a bras d'honneur as he was being booed while on stage. He would apologise for the gesture two days later during a RTVE press conference. The selection of Xavi Martínez as a jury member, who voted for Navarro during the tie-break voting round, was later challenged over potential conflict of interest since he had promoted Navarro and his song on his radio program on Los 40. In February 2017, members of the Spanish Parliament José Miguel Camacho and Ricardo Sixto placed motions to request RTVE for clarification on the details of the selection process for Eurovision and on the possibility of nullifying the results of the national final. On 22 February 2017, TVE's Head of Entertainment and organiser of the national final Toñi Prieto was summoned to appear before RTVE's Audit Committee to clarify allegations of mishandling.

RTVE issued a statement on 26 February 2017, stating that the selection process had been conducted following the regulations set by the European Broadcasting Union and that all candidates had accepted the rules at every stage of the process. The statement also defended the criteria of the jury members, stating that, as music radio hosts from the three main media groups in the country, it is "evident" that they "usually have contact with artists, singers and music producers for professional reasons".

=== Preparation ===
The official video of the song, directed by Mauri D. Galiano, was filmed in February 2017 on the north coast of Tenerife, Canary Islands. The video premiered on 9 March 2017, which served as the official preview video for the Spanish entry.

=== Promotion ===
Manel Navarro made appearances across Europe to specifically promote "Do It for Your Lover" as the Spanish Eurovision entry. On 18 February and 5 March, Manel Navarro performed "Do It for Your Lover" during the third semi-final of the Ukrainian Eurovision national final and the final of the Romanian Eurovision national final, respectively. On 2 April, he performed during the London Eurovision Party, which was held at the Café de Paris venue in London, United Kingdom and hosted by Nicki French and Paddy O'Connell. Between 3 and 6 April, Navarro took part in promotional activities in Tel Aviv, Israel and performed during the Israel Calling event held at the Ha'teatron venue. On 8 April, he performed during the Eurovision in Concert event which was held at the Melkweg venue in Amsterdam, Netherlands and hosted by Cornald Maas and Selma Björnsdóttir. Navarro also took part in promotional activities in Portugal on 26 and 27 April where he appeared during the RTP1 talk show 5 Para A Meia-Noite.

In addition to his international appearances, he performed the song on the talk show ¡Qué tiempo tan feliz! on Telecinco on 25 February. On 15 April, Navarro performed during the Eurovision Spain Pre-Party, which was held at the Sala La Riviera venue in Madrid. On 25 April, a farewell party was held for Navarro before he travelled to Kyiv for the contest, which took place at the Ukrainian Embassy in Madrid, hosted by Ambassador Anatoly Scherba.

== At Eurovision ==
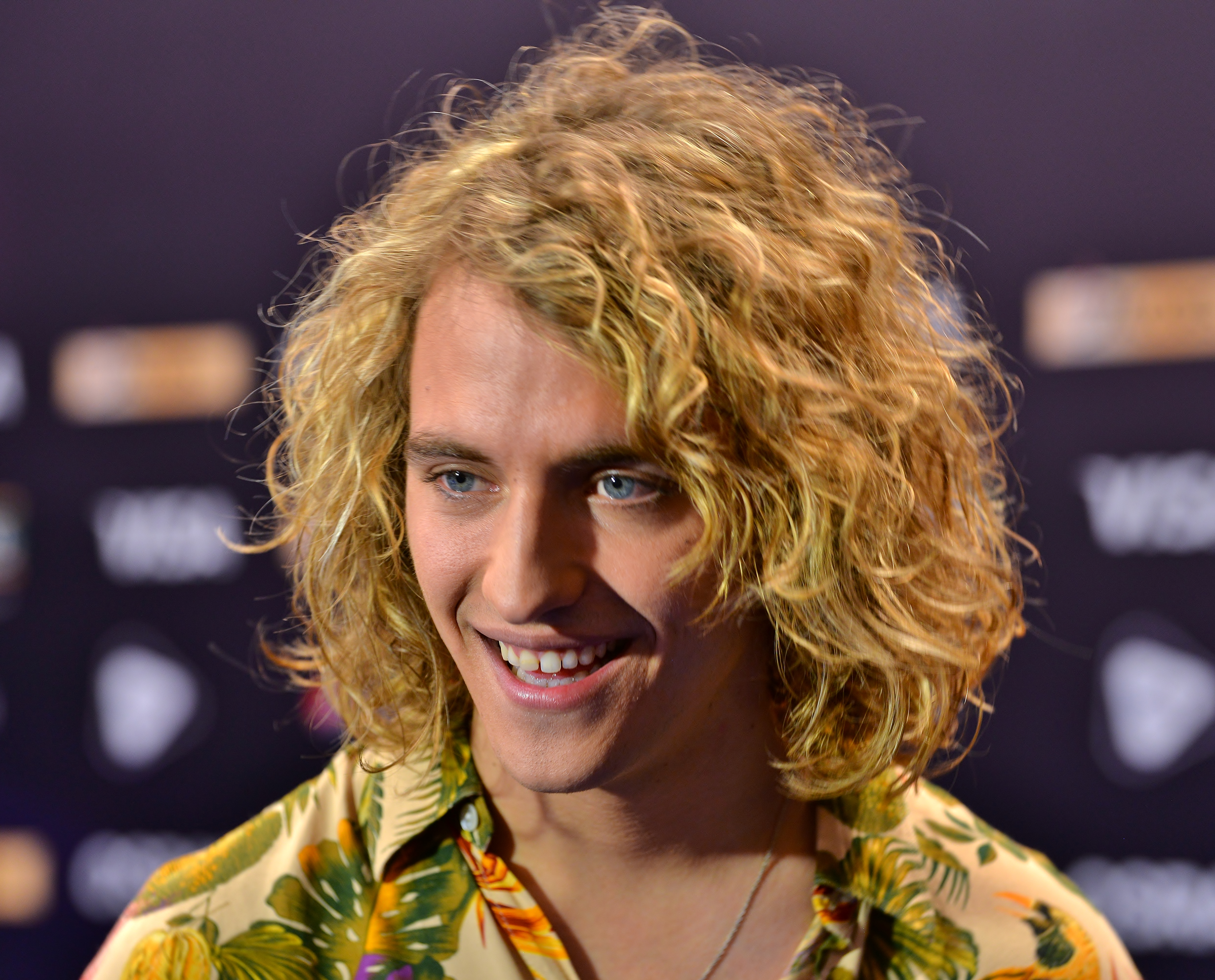
Manel Navarro during a press meet and greet

According to Eurovision rules, all nations with the exceptions of the host country and the "Big Five" (France, Germany, Italy, Spain and the United Kingdom) are required to qualify from one of two semi-finals in order to compete for the final; the top ten countries from each semi-final progress to the final. As a member of the "Big Five", Spain automatically qualified to compete in the final on 13 May 2017. In addition to their participation in the final, Spain is also required to broadcast and vote in one of the two semi-finals. During the semi-final allocation draw on 31 January 2017, Spain was assigned to broadcast and vote in the first semi-final on 9 May 2017.

In Spain, the semi-finals were broadcast on La 2 and the final was broadcast on La 1 with commentary by José María Íñigo and Julia Varela. RTVE appointed Nieves Álvarez as its spokesperson to announce during the final the top 12-point score awarded by the Spanish jury.

=== Final ===
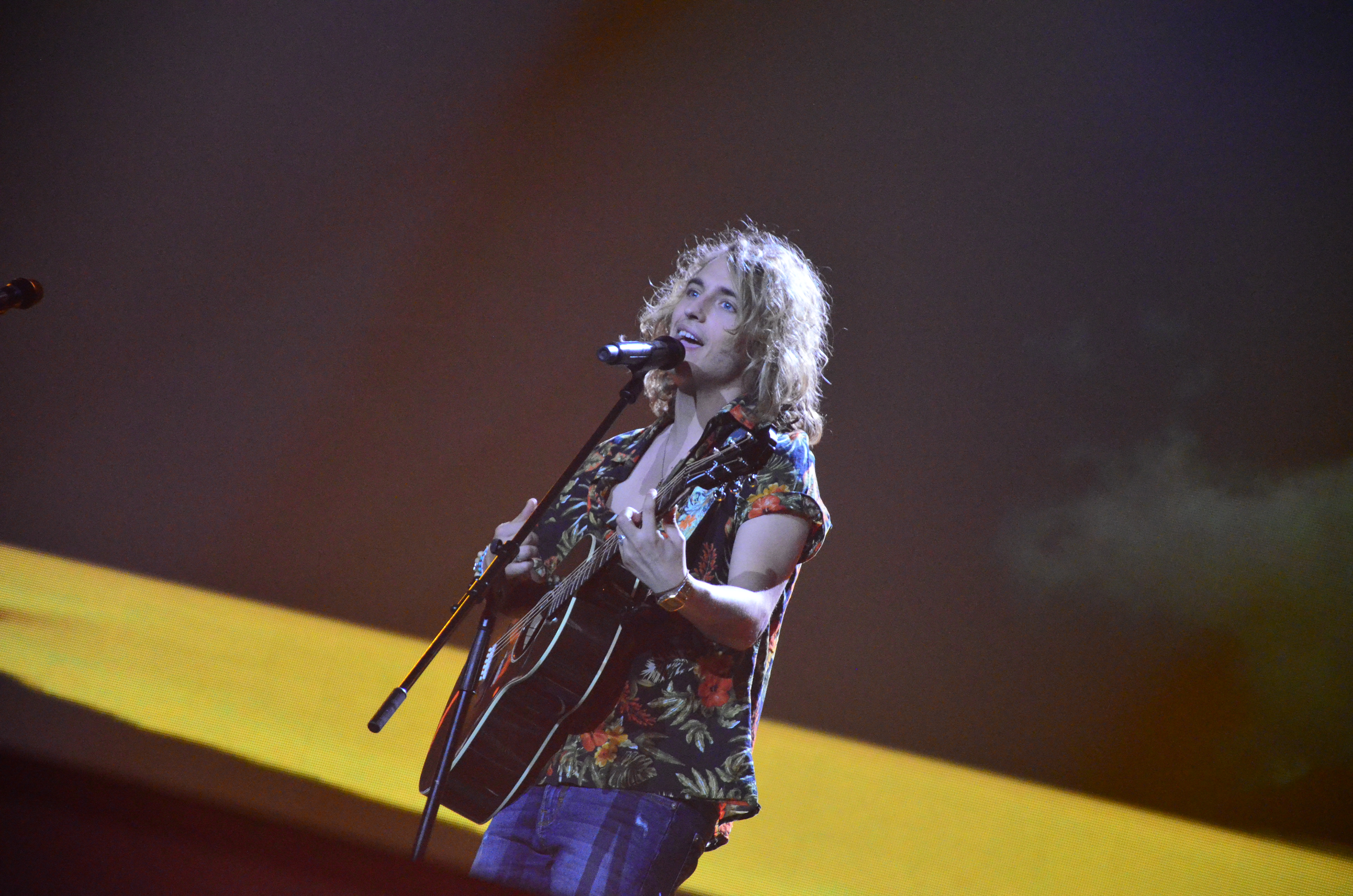
Manel Navarro during a rehearsal before the final

Manel Navarro took part in technical rehearsals on 5 and 7 May, followed by dress rehearsals on 8, 12 and 13 May. This included the semi-final jury show on 8 May where an extended clip of the Spanish performance was filmed for broadcast during the live show on 9 May and the jury final on 12 May where the professional juries of each country watched and voted on the competing entries. After technical rehearsals were held on 7 May, the "Big Five" countries and host country Ukraine held a press conference. As part of this press conference, the artists took part in a draw to determine which half of the grand final they would subsequently participate in. Spain was drawn to compete in the second half. Following the conclusion of the second semi-final, the shows' producers decided upon the running order of the final. The running order for the semi-finals and final was decided by the shows' producers rather than through another draw, so that similar songs were not placed next to each other. Spain was subsequently placed to perform in position 16, following the entry from Greece and before the entry from Norway.

The Spanish performance featured Manel Navarro on stage wearing a Hawaiian shirt, joined by two backing vocalists, two guitarists and a drummer dressed in surfer outfits. The background LED screens displayed a red and white recreational vehicle, surf boards, palm trees, and yellow and red beach umbrellas. The stage director for the performance was Hans Pannecoucke. The two backing vocalists that joined Manel Navarro were Álex González and Alejandro de los Santos, while the musicians were Edgar Regincos, Marc Montserrat and Pol Niubó. Spain placed twenty-sixth (last) in the final, scoring 5 points, 5 points from the televoting and 0 points from the juries. RTVE indirectly blamed Navarro's voice crack during the performance as the reason for the nation's last place, which was criticized by Spanish media.

=== Voting ===
Voting during the three shows involved each country awarding two sets of points from 1-8, 10 and 12: one from their professional jury and the other from televoting. Each participating broadcaster assembles a five-member jury panel consisting of music industry professionals who are citizens of the country they represent, with their names published before the contest to ensure transparency. This jury judged each entry based on: vocal capacity; the stage performance; the song's composition and originality; and the overall impression by the act. In addition, no member of a national jury was permitted to be related in any way to any of the competing acts in such a way that they cannot vote impartially and independently. The individual rankings of each jury member as well as the nation's televoting results were released shortly after the grand final.

Below is a breakdown of points awarded to Spain and awarded by Spain in the first semi-final and grand final of the contest, and the breakdown of the jury voting and televoting conducted during the two shows:

==== Points awarded to Spain ====
In the final, Spain received five points in the televote from Portugal; they received no points from the jury.

==== Points awarded by Spain ====
Points awarded by Spain (Semi-final 1)
Score	Televote	Jury
12 points	Portugal	Portugal
10 points	Moldova	Czech Republic
8 points	Belgium	Australia
7 points	Iceland	Moldova
6 points	Sweden	Greece
5 points	Finland	Azerbaijan
4 points	Armenia	Slovenia
3 points	Poland	Sweden
2 points	Latvia	Belgium
1 point	Montenegro	Iceland

Points awarded by Spain (Final)
Score	Televote	Jury
12 points	Portugal	Portugal
10 points	Bulgaria	Italy
8 points	Italy	Australia
7 points	Romania	Moldova
6 points	Moldova	Bulgaria
5 points	Sweden	Sweden
4 points	Belgium	Belgium
3 points	France	Austria
2 points	Netherlands	Greece
1 point	United Kingdom	Netherlands

==== Detailed voting results ====
The following members comprised the Spanish jury:

- David Civera (jury chairperson) – singer, represented Spain in 2001
- Paula Fernández Vázquez (Paula Rojo) – singer
- Rubén Villanueva – composer, producer
- Antonio Hueso – radio DJ
- Natalia Rodríguez Gallego (Natalia) – singer

Detailed voting results from Spain (Semi-final 1)
R/O	Country	Jury							Televote	
R/O	Country	D. Civera	P. Rojo	R. Villanueva	A. Hueso	Natalia	Rank	Points	Rank	Points
01	Sweden	13	10	6	4	7	8	3	5	6
02	Georgia	8	8	14	11	13	11		18	
03	Australia	6	5	3	3	3	3	8	17	
04	Albania	16	16	15	12	15	16		16	
05	Belgium	15	13	4	10	10	9	2	3	8
06	Montenegro	18	18	18	17	18	18		10	1
07	Finland	14	17	10	14	14	14		6	5
08	Azerbaijan	7	4	7	7	5	6	5	15	
09	Portugal	3	2	1	1	2	1	12	1	12
10	Greece	4	6	12	6	1	5	6	11	
11	Poland	11	11	9	13	11	12		8	3
12	Moldova	2	7	5	5	4	4	7	2	10
13	Iceland	10	9	13	9	12	10	1	4	7
14	Czech Republic	1	1	2	2	8	2	10	14	
15	Cyprus	12	12	16	15	16	15		12	
16	Armenia	9	14	8	16	9	13		7	4
17	Slovenia	5	3	11	8	6	7	4	13	
18	Latvia	17	15	17	18	17	17		9	2

Detailed voting results from Spain (Final)
R/O	Country	Jury							Televote	
R/O	Country	D. Civera	P. Rojo	R. Villanueva	A. Hueso	Natalia	Rank	Points	Rank	Points
01	Israel	20	19	23	19	19	22		14	
02	Poland	19	21	20	17	21	21		18	
03	Belarus	23	17	17	15	22	19		20	
04	Austria	8	7	8	7	10	8	3	22	
05	Armenia	13	24	19	21	9	17		15	
06	Netherlands	10	3	13	13	11	10	1	9	2
07	Moldova	2	12	5	6	6	4	7	5	6
08	Hungary	25	25	24	14	25	24		17	
09	Italy	3	1	2	2	1	2	10	3	8
10	Denmark	11	10	14	12	12	12		24	
11	Portugal	1	2	1	1	3	1	12	1	12
12	Azerbaijan	12	15	11	11	13	13		25	
13	Croatia	9	18	12	23	17	15		11	
14	Australia	7	8	4	4	4	3	8	23	
15	Greece	5	13	18	10	2	9	2	21	
16	Spain									
17	Norway	22	22	21	25	24	25		19	
18	United Kingdom	14	9	22	18	14	14		10	1
19	Cyprus	17	20	25	16	20	20		16	
20	Romania	24	14	9	20	16	16		4	7
21	Germany	18	16	16	22	18	18		12	
22	Ukraine	21	23	15	24	23	23		13	
23	Belgium	15	5	3	9	8	7	4	7	4
24	Sweden	4	11	7	3	7	6	5	6	5
25	Bulgaria	6	6	6	8	5	5	6	2	10
26	France	16	4	10	5	15	11		8	3
