= Javier Cárdenas =

Javier Cárdenas may refer to:

- Javier Cárdenas (footballer) (1952–2022), Mexican footballer
- Javier Cárdenas (presenter) (born 1970), Spanish singer and television and radio presenter
- Javier Cárdenas (journalist) (born 1988), Venezuelan journalist and activist
- Javier Valdez Cárdenas (1967–2017), Mexican journalist and founder of Ríodoce, a newspaper based in Sinaloa
