= Montenegro in the Eurovision Song Contest 2017 =

- Eurovision Song Contest 2017
- Participating broadcaster: Radio i Televizija Crne Gore (RTCG)
- Country: Montenegro
- Selection process: Internal selection
- Announcement date: Artist: 29 December 2016; Song: 10 March 2017

Competing entry
- Song: "Space"
- Artist: Slavko Kalezić
- Songwriters: Adis Eminić; Iva Boršić; Momčilo Zeković

Placement
- Semi-final result: Failed to qualify (16th)

Participation chronology

Montenegro was represented at the Eurovision Song Contest 2017 with the song "Space" written by Adis Eminić, Iva Boršić and Momčilo Zeković. The song was performed by Slavko Kalezić, who was internally selected by the Montenegrin broadcaster Radio i televizija Crne Gore (RTCG) to represent the nation at the 2017 contest in Kyiv, Ukraine. Slavko Kalezić was announced as the Montenegrin representative on 29 December 2016, while his song, "Space", was presented to the public on 10 March 2017.

Montenegro was drawn to compete in the first semi-final of the Eurovision Song Contest which took place on 9 May 2017. Performing during the show in position 6, "Space" was not announced among the top 10 entries of the second semi-final and therefore did not qualify to compete in the final. It was later revealed that Montenegro placed sixteenth out of the 18 participating countries in the semi-final with 56 points.

== Background ==
Prior to the 2017 contest, Montenegro had participated in the Eurovision Song Contest as an independent nation eight times since its first entry in its own right in 2007. The nation's best placing in the contest was thirteenth, which they achieved in 2015 with the song "Adio" performed by Knez. In 2016, Montenegro failed to qualify with the song "The Real Thing" performed by Highway. The nation briefly withdrew from the competition between 2010 and 2011 citing financial difficulties as the reason for their absence.

The Montenegrin national broadcaster, Radio i televizija Crne Gore (RTCG), broadcasts the event within Montenegro and organises the selection process for the nation's entry. RTCG confirmed that Montenegro would participate at the Eurovision Song Contest 2017 on 23 September 2016. Montenegro has used various methods to select the Montenegrin entry in the past, such as internal selections and televised national finals to choose the performer, song or both to compete at Eurovision. Since 2009, the broadcaster has opted to internally select both the artist and song that would represent Montenegro, a procedure that continued for the selection of the 2017 entry.

== Before Eurovision ==
=== Internal selection ===
On 18 October 2016, RTCG opened a submission period where artists and songwriters were able to submit their entries until 20 November 2016. Songwriters were required to be citizens of Montenegro or have permanent residence in Montenegro for at least two years. RTCG received 27 entries at the closing of the deadline. A selection jury that consisted of Radio Montenegro music editors Nada Vučinić and Vladimir Maraš, TVCG music editor Slaven Knezović, Head of the RTCG programme promotion department Sabrija Vulić, TVCG entertainment editor Ivan Maksimović and director Danijela Popović evaluated the received submissions and shortlisted two entries, and an alternate jury consisting of Radio Montenegro music editor Biljana Papović, set designer and musician Pjetar Dedivanović and sound engineer and producer Dalibor Nedović selected the Montenegrin representative and song from the two entries.

On 29 December 2016, "Space" performed by Slavko Kalezić was announced as the Montenegrin entry in the contest. Kalezić gained notability in Montenegro for his participation in the first season of the reality singing competition X Factor Adria. The song was presented at a press conference on 10 March 2017, which was held at Imanje Knjaz in Podgorica. "Space" was written by Adis Eminić, Iva Boršić and Momčilo Zeković, while production and mixing was carried out by Stefan Örn, Jovan Radomir and Johan Kronlund. Slavko Kalezić recorded the music video for the song in March 2017, which was filmed in Bjelopavlići and at the Budo Tomović Cultural Center in Podgorica and directed by Dejan Milićević.

=== Promotion ===
Slavko Kalezić made several appearances across Europe to specifically promote "Space" as the Montenegrin Eurovision entry. On 2 April, Slavko Kalezić performed during the London Eurovision Party, which was held at the Café de Paris venue in London, United Kingdom and hosted by Nicki French and Paddy O'Connell. On 8 April, Kalezić performed during the Eurovision in Concert event which was held at the Melkweg venue in Amsterdam, Netherlands and hosted by Cornald Maas and Selma Björnsdóttir. On 15 April, Kalezić performed during the Eurovision Spain Pre-Party, which was held at the Sala La Riviera venue in Madrid, Spain.

== At Eurovision ==
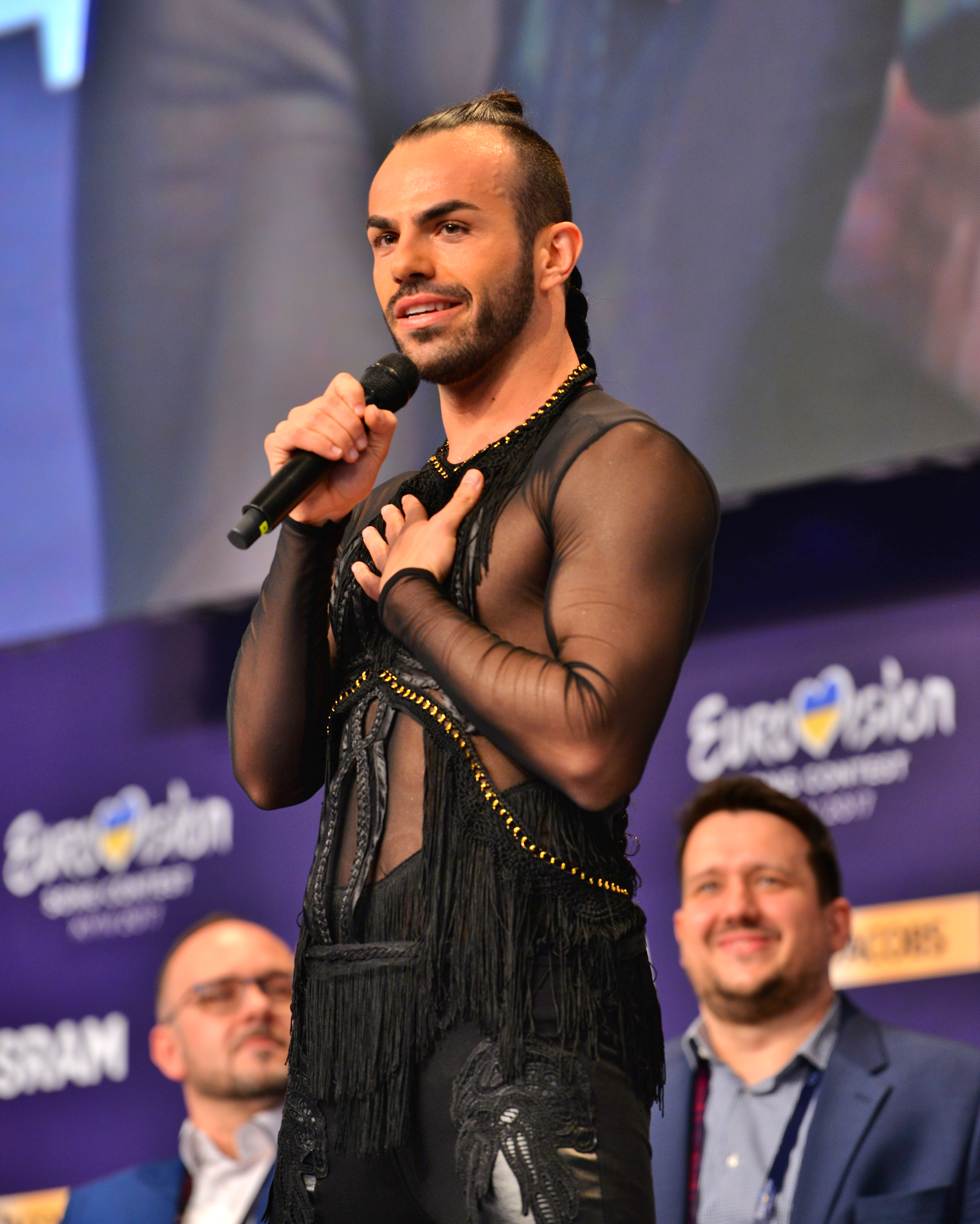
Slavko Kalezić during a press meet and greet

According to Eurovision rules, all nations with the exceptions of the host country and the "Big Five" (France, Germany, Italy, Spain and the United Kingdom) are required to qualify from one of two semi-finals in order to compete for the final; the top ten countries from each semi-final progress to the final. The European Broadcasting Union (EBU) split up the competing countries into six different pots based on voting patterns from previous contests, with countries with favourable voting histories put into the same pot. On 31 January 2017, a special allocation draw was held which placed each country into one of the two semi-finals, as well as which half of the show they would perform in. Montenegro was placed into the first semi-final, to be held on 9 May 2017, and was scheduled to perform in the first half of the show.

Once all the competing songs for the 2017 contest had been released, the running order for the semi-finals was decided by the shows' producers rather than through another draw, so that similar songs were not placed next to each other. Montenegro was set to perform in position 6, following the entry from Belgium and before the entry from Finland.

The two semi-finals and the final were broadcast in Montenegro on TVCG 1 and TVCG SAT with commentary by Dražen Bauković and Tijana Mišković. Mišković was also the Montenegrin spokesperson who announced the top 12-point score awarded by the Montenegrin jury during the final.

=== Semi-final ===
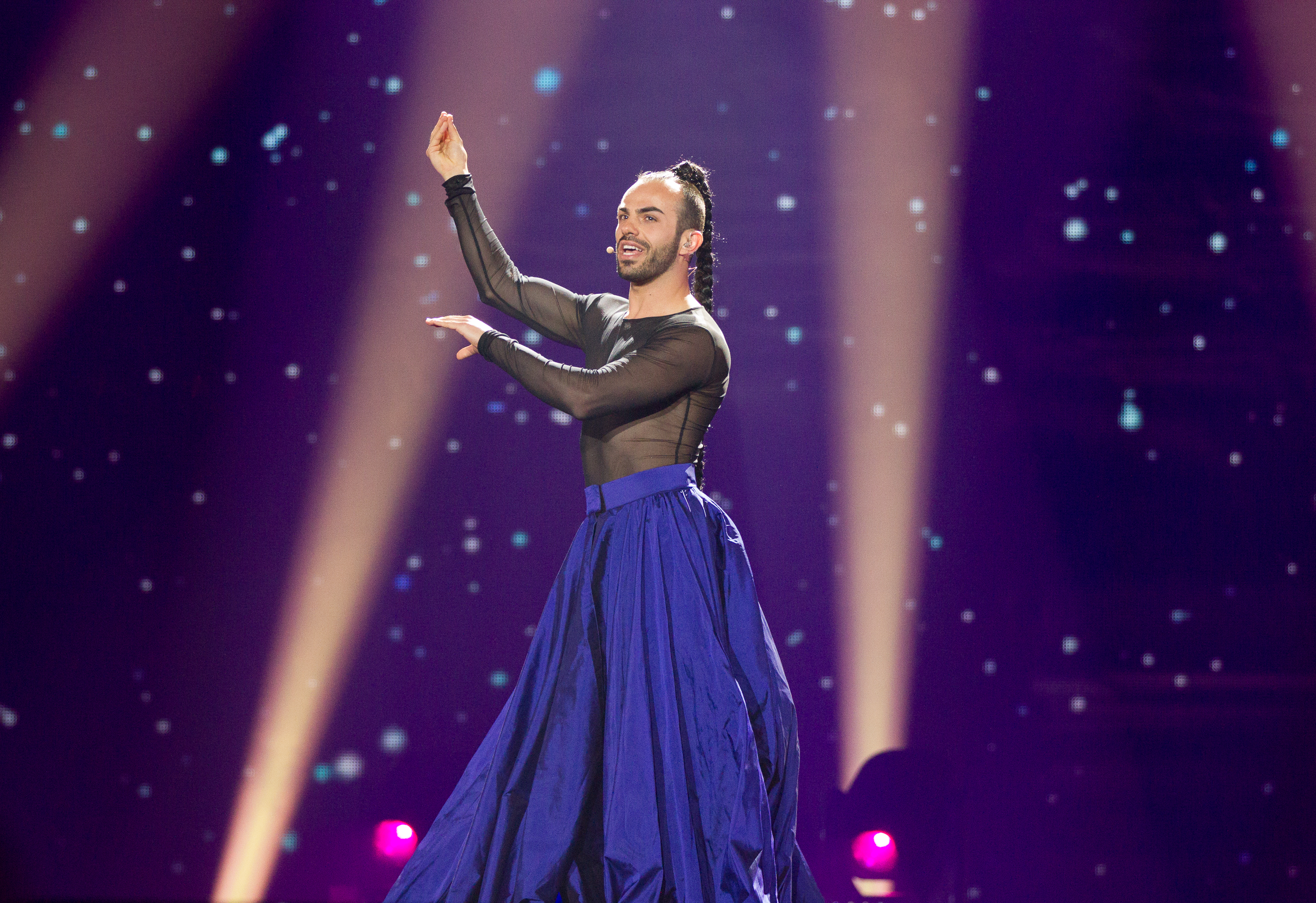
Slavko Kalezić during a rehearsal before the first semi-final

Slavko Kalezić took part in technical rehearsals on 30 April and 4 May, followed by dress rehearsals on 8 and 9 May. This included the jury show on 8 May where the professional juries of each country watched and voted on the competing entries.

The Montenegrin performance featured Slavko Kalezić performing a choreographed routine on stage in a black translucent top and a blue skirt that was later removed to reveal a spray-on black leggings with crystals. The LED screens displayed bright colours and various images of Kalezić dancing. The stage director for the performance was Dejan Milićević who also directed the music video of "Space" and the choreographer was Milica Cerović. Slavko Kalezić's outfit was created by designer Marina Banović Džuver. Three off-stage backing vocalists, Igor Stanojević, Marko Nikolić and Oliver Katić, were also part of the performance.

At the end of the show, Montenegro was not announced among the top 10 entries in the first semi-final and therefore failed to qualify to compete in the final. It was later revealed that Montenegro placed sixteenth in the semi-final, receiving a total of 56 points: 39 points from the televoting and 17 points from the juries.

=== Voting ===
Voting during the three shows involved each country awarding two sets of points from 1-8, 10 and 12: one from their professional jury and the other from televoting. Each nation's jury consisted of five music industry professionals who are citizens of the country they represent, with their names published before the contest to ensure transparency. This jury judged each entry based on: vocal capacity; the stage performance; the song's composition and originality; and the overall impression by the act. In addition, no member of a national jury was permitted to be related in any way to any of the competing acts in such a way that they cannot vote impartially and independently. The individual rankings of each jury member as well as the nation's televoting results were released shortly after the grand final.

Below is a breakdown of points awarded to Montenegro and awarded by Montenegro in the first semi-final and grand final of the contest, and the breakdown of the jury voting and televoting conducted during the two shows:

==== Points awarded to Montenegro ====
Points awarded to Montenegro (Semi-final 1)
Score	Televote	Jury
12 points		
10 points		
8 points	Moldova	Azerbaijan
7 points	Australia	Greece
6 points	Slovenia	
5 points	Azerbaijan; Italy	
4 points		
3 points	Finland	
2 points	Iceland	Czech Republic
1 point	Armenia; Spain; Sweden	

==== Points awarded by Montenegro ====
Points awarded by Montenegro (Semi-final 1)
Score	Televote	Jury
12 points	Albania	Greece
10 points	Moldova	Albania
8 points	Slovenia	Armenia
7 points	Portugal	Azerbaijan
6 points	Azerbaijan	Sweden
5 points	Cyprus	Moldova
4 points	Greece	Portugal
3 points	Sweden	Australia
2 points	Belgium	Czech Republic
1 point	Australia	Slovenia

Points awarded by Montenegro (Final)
Score	Televote	Jury
12 points	Croatia	Greece
10 points	Italy	Romania
8 points	Portugal	Italy
7 points	Hungary	Sweden
6 points	Bulgaria	Belgium
5 points	Azerbaijan	Croatia
4 points	Belgium	Armenia
3 points	Moldova	France
2 points	France	Bulgaria
1 point	Cyprus	Austria

==== Detailed voting results ====
The following members will comprise the Montenegrin jury:

- Božo Bulatović – musician, radio DJ
- Branislav Nedović – singer, musician
- Ivana Pekić – solo singing professor
- Draško Đurović – TV and movie director
- Anita Popović – musician (jury member in semi-final 1)
- Dragan Bulajić – music manager (jury member in the final)

Detailed voting results from Montenegro (Semi-final 1)
R/O	Country	Jury							Televote	
R/O	Country	B. Bulatović	B. Nedović	I. Pekić	D. Đurović	A. Popović	Rank	Points	Rank	Points
01	Sweden	2	14	13	2	6	5	6	8	3
02	Georgia	14	3	15	10	8	12		16	
03	Australia	17	10	10	1	2	8	3	10	1
04	Albania	1	7	1	8	10	2	10	1	12
05	Belgium	7	4	14	14	15	13		9	2
06	Montenegro									
07	Finland	5	17	16	15	16	17		17	
08	Azerbaijan	11	5	4	11	5	4	7	5	6
09	Portugal	15	9	2	6	7	7	4	4	7
10	Greece	8	1	8	5	1	1	12	7	4
11	Poland	13	13	17	9	9	16		13	
12	Moldova	9	6	12	7	4	6	5	2	10
13	Iceland	10	2	7	17	13	11		11	
14	Czech Republic	3	15	5	13	11	9	2	15	
15	Cyprus	12	11	3	16	14	14		6	5
16	Armenia	4	12	11	4	3	3	8	14	
17	Slovenia	16	8	9	3	12	10	1	3	8
18	Latvia	6	16	6	12	17	15		12	

Detailed voting results from Montenegro (Final)
R/O	Country	Jury							Televote	
R/O	Country	B. Bulatović	B. Nedović	I. Pekić	D. Đurović	D. Bulajić	Rank	Points	Rank	Points
01	Israel	26	24	25	6	26	26		16	
02	Poland	13	11	20	18	12	16		23	
03	Belarus	21	25	16	23	19	25		13	
04	Austria	12	12	6	26	7	10	1	21	
05	Armenia	8	26	4	12	6	7	4	20	
06	Netherlands	24	23	5	25	14	21		26	
07	Moldova	19	9	10	19	8	12		8	3
08	Hungary	20	17	17	11	25	20		4	7
09	Italy	2	5	2	4	4	3	8	2	10
10	Denmark	17	16	26	21	13	22		18	
11	Portugal	18	3	9	14	20	11		3	8
12	Azerbaijan	22	20	8	20	10	17		6	5
13	Croatia	5	8	11	7	24	6	5	1	12
14	Australia	23	18	12	10	11	15		14	
15	Greece	4	4	1	2	1	1	12	19	
16	Spain	15	21	14	22	23	24		25	
17	Norway	14	19	18	17	17	19		24	
18	United Kingdom	1	10	19	13	22	13		17	
19	Cyprus	16	15	21	24	18	23		10	1
20	Romania	3	1	3	3	3	2	10	11	
21	Germany	9	22	22	15	16	18		22	
22	Ukraine	25	14	24	9	2	14		15	
23	Belgium	7	7	15	8	5	5	6	7	4
24	Sweden	6	6	7	5	15	4	7	12	
25	Bulgaria	11	2	23	16	9	9	2	5	6
26	France	10	13	13	1	21	8	3	9	2
