= Paula Rojo =

- Born: Paula Fernández Vázquez; 16 July 1990 (age 36); Mieres, Asturias, Spain
- Genres: Pop; Country
- Occupations: Singer; songwriter
- Instruments: Vocals; Guitar; Ukulele; Banjo; Piano
- Years active: 2012-present

Paula Fernández Vázquez (Spanish pronunciation: [ˈpawla feɾˈnandeθ ˈβaθkeθ]; (Note: In isolation, Vázquez is pronounced [ˈbaθkeθ].) born 16 July 1990), better known as Paula Rojo (Spanish pronunciation: [ˈpawla ˈroxo]), is a Spanish singer and songwriter.

== Life and career ==
Paula grew up in Mieres, Asturias and started training in music and piano and singing in school choirs from an early age. At 18, she relocated to Galicia to study Translation and Interpretation at the University of Vigo and began to write her own songs. At the same time, she created the band Érase Un Verano together with guitarist Tristán Armas and began giving concerts in Asturias. In early 2012, Érase Un Verano participated in the television talent competition Tú sí que vales.

In September 2012, Paula entered season one of talent show La Voz, the Spanish version of The Voice. In the Blind Auditions she performed Zac Brown Band's "Chicken Fried", with the four coaches turning for her. She eventually chose to join team Melendi. During the Duels, Paula battled Yhadira García singing Avril Lavigne's "Complicated" and Paula won the duel to make it through to the live shows. During the first live show she performed Natalie Imbruglia's "Torn", she was saved by the coach and progressed to the next round. In the next round she performed Taylor Swift's "Our Song", she was not saved by her coach and was eliminated from the show.

Performances on La Voz
Performed	Song	Original artist	Result
Blind Auditions	"Chicken Fried"	Zac Brown Band	Joined Team Melendi
Battles	"Complicated" (against Yhadira García)	Avril Lavigne	Winner
Live Shows – 1st Round	"Torn"	Natalie Imbruglia	Saved by coach
Live Shows – 2nd Round	"Our Song"	Taylor Swift	Eliminated

Despite not reaching the finale of La Voz, Paula was signed to Universal Music Spain. Her first album Érase un sueño was released on 16 April 2013. Her debut single "Solo tú" obtained commercial success, peaking at number five on the Spanish Singles Chart.

On 30 June 2015, she released her second album, Creer para ver.

On 12 January 2017, Paula was announced as one of the six candidates to represent Spain in the Eurovision Song Contest 2017. She participated in the national final Objetivo Eurovisión 2017 organised by TVE with "Lo que nunca fue", a song written by herself and Álvaro Bárcena. She finished fifth.

== Discography ==
=== Studio albums ===
Title	Details	Peak chart positions
Title	Details	SPA
Érase un sueño	Released: 16 April 2013; Re-released: 29 October 2013; Formats: CD, digital download; Label: Universal Music Spain	6
Creer para ver	Released: 30 June 2015; Formats: CD, digital download; Label: Universal Music Spain	6
Un viaje en el tiempo	Released: 12 May 2017; Formats: CD, digital download; Label: Universal Music Spain	30

=== Singles ===
Title	Year	Peak position SPA	Album
"Solo tú"	2013	5	Érase un sueño
"Miedo a querer"	2015	–	Creer para ver
"Lo que nunca fue"	2017	–	Un viaje en el tiempo
