= Iceland in the Eurovision Song Contest 2017 =

- Eurovision Song Contest 2017
- Participating broadcaster: Ríkisútvarpið (RÚV)
- Country: Iceland
- Selection process: Söngvakeppnin 2017
- Selection date: 11 March 2017

Competing entry
- Song: "Paper"
- Artist: Svala
- Songwriters: Svala Björgvinsdóttir; Einar Egilsson; Lester Mendez; Lily Elise

Placement
- Semi-final result: Failed to qualify (15th)

Participation chronology

Iceland was represented at the Eurovision Song Contest 2017 with the song "Paper" written by Svala Björgvinsdóttir, Einar Egilsson, Lester Mendez and Lily Elise. The song was performed by Svala. The Icelandic entry for the 2017 contest in Kyiv, Ukraine was selected through the national final Söngvakeppnin 2017, organised by the Icelandic broadcaster Ríkisútvarpið (RÚV). The selection consisted of two semi-finals and a final, held on 25 February, 4 March and 11 March 2017 respectively. Six songs competed in each semi-final with the top three as selected by a public televote alongside a jury wildcard advancing to the final. In the final, the winner was selected over two rounds of voting: the first involved a 50/50 combination of jury voting and public televoting, which reduced the seven competing entries to two superfinalists and the second round selected the winner exclusively through public televoting. "Paper" performed by Svala emerged as the winner after gaining 62.51% of the public vote.

Iceland was drawn to compete in the first semi-final of the Eurovision Song Contest which took place on 9 May 2017. Performing during the show in position 13, "Paper" was not announced among the top 10 entries of the first semi-final and therefore did not qualify to compete in the final. It was later revealed that Iceland placed fifteenth out of the 18 participating countries in the semi-final with 60 points.

== Background ==
Prior to the 2017 contest, Iceland had participated in the Eurovision Song Contest twenty-nine times since its first entry in 1986. Iceland's best placing in the contest to this point was second, which it achieved on two occasions: in 1999 with the song "All Out of Luck" performed by Selma and in 2009 with the song "Is It True?" performed by Yohanna. Since the introduction of a semi-final to the format of the Eurovision Song Contest in 2004, Iceland has, to this point, only failed to qualify to the final five times. In 2016, Iceland failed to qualify to the final with the song "Hear Them Calling" performed by Greta Salóme.

The Icelandic national broadcaster, Ríkisútvarpið (RÚV), broadcasts the event within Iceland and organises the selection process for the nation's entry. RÚV confirmed their intentions to participate at the 2017 Eurovision Song Contest on 22 August 2016. Since 2006, Iceland has used a national final to select their entry for the Eurovision Song Contest, a method that continued for their 2017 participation.

== Before Eurovision ==
=== Söngvakeppnin 2017 ===
Söngvakeppnin 2017 was the national final format developed by RÚV in order to select Iceland's entry for the Eurovision Song Contest 2017. The three shows in the competition were hosted by Ragnhildur Steinunn Jónsdóttir and all took place in Reykjavík: the two semi-finals were held at the Háskólabíó venue and the final took place at the Laugardalshöll. The semi-finals and final were broadcast on RÚV and online at the broadcaster's official website ruv.is.

==== Format ====
Twelve songs in total competed in Söngvakeppnin 2017 where the winner was determined after two semi-finals and a final. Six songs competed in each semi-final on 25 February and 4 March 2017. The top three songs from each semi-final, as determined by public televoting qualified to the final which took place on 11 March 2017. A jury also selected a wildcard act for the final out of the remaining non-qualifying acts from both semi-finals. The winning entry in the final was determined over two rounds of voting: the first to select the top two via 50/50 public televoting and jury voting and the second to determine the winner with 100% televoting. All songs were required to be performed in Icelandic during the semi-final portion of the competition. In the final, the song was required to be performed in the language that the artist intended to perform in at the Eurovision Song Contest in Kyiv. In addition to selecting the Icelandic entry for Eurovision, a monetary prize of 1 million Icelandic króna was awarded to the songwriters responsible for the winning entry.

==== Competing entries ====
On 20 September 2016, RÚV opened the submission period for interested songwriters to submit their entries until the deadline on 28 October 2016. Songwriters were required to be Icelandic, possess Icelandic citizenship or have permanent residency in Iceland between 1 September 2016 and 14 May 2017. However, exceptions would be made for minor collaborations with foreign songwriters as long as two-thirds of the composition and half of the lyrics are by Icelandic composers/lyricists. Composers had the right to submit up to two entries, while lyricists could contribute to an unlimited amount of entries. At the close of the submission deadline, over 200 entries were received. A seven-member selection committee was formed under consultation with the Association of Composers (FTT) and the Icelandic Musicians' Union (FÍH) in order to select the top twelve entries. The twelve competing artists and songs were revealed and presented by the broadcaster during the television programme Kynningarþáttur Söngvakeppninnar on 20 January 2017. All of the competing entries that later qualified to the final entered English versions of their songs for the competition.

Artist	Song		Songwriter(s)
Artist	Icelandic Title	English Title	Songwriter(s)
Arnar Jónsson and Rakel Pálsdóttir	"Til mín"	"Again"	Hólmfríður Ósk Samúelsdóttir
Aron Brink	"Þú hefur dáleitt mig"	"Hypnotised"	Þórunn Erna Clausen, Michael James Down, Will Taylor, Aron Brink
Aron Hannes Emilsson	"Nótt"	"Tonight"	Sveinn Rúnar Sigurðsson, Ágúst Ibsen
Daði Freyr Pétursson	"Hvað með það?"	"Is This Love?"	Daði Freyr Pétursson
Erna Mist Pétursdóttir	"Skuggamynd"	"I'll Be Gone"	Erna Mist Pétursdóttir, Guðbjörg Magnúsdóttir
Hildur	"Bammbaramm"		Hildur Kristín Stefánsdóttir
Júlí Heiðar Halldórsson and Þórdís Birna Borgarsdóttir	"Heim til þín"	"Get Back Home"	Júlí Heiðar Halldórsson, Guðmundur Snorri Sigurðsson
Linda Hartmanns	"Ástfangin"	"Obvious Love"	Linda Hartmanns, Erla Bolladóttir
Páll Rósinkranz and Kristina Bærendsen	"Þú og ég"	"You and I"	Mark Brink
Rúnar Eff Rúnarsson	"Mér við hlið"	"Make Your Way Back Home"	Rúnar Eff Rúnarsson
Sólveig Ásgeirsdóttir	"Treystu á mig"	"Trust In Me"	Iðunn Ásgeirsdóttir, Ragnheiður Bjarnadóttir
Svala Björgvinsdóttir	"Ég veit það"	"Paper"	Svala Björgvinsdóttir, Einar Egilsson, Lester Mendez, Lily Elise

==== Shows ====
===== Semi-finals =====
The two semi-finals took place on 25 February and 4 March 2017. In each semi-final six acts presented their entries, and the top three entries voted upon solely by public televoting proceeded to the final. "Bammbaramm" performed by Hildur was awarded the jury wildcard and also proceeded to the final.

The shows also featured guest performances by Emmsjé Gauti in the first semi-final, and Sycamore Tree (which included 2006 Icelandic Eurovision entrant Ágústa Eva Erlendsdóttir) in the second semi-final. Gauti performed a remix of the 1997 Icelandic Eurovision entry "Minn hinsti dans", while Sycamore Tree covered the 1976 Eurovision winning entry "Save Your Kisses for Me".

Semi-final 1 – 25 February 2017
R/O	Artist	Song	Televote	Place	Result
1	Hildur	"Bammbaramm"	3,287	4	Wildcard
2	Erna Mist Pétursdóttir	"Skuggamynd"	1,681	6	—N/a
3	Arnar Jónsson and Rakel Pálsdótir	"Til mín"	3,319	3	Advanced
4	Júlí Heiðar Halldórsson and Þórdís Birna Borgarsdóttir	"Heim til þín"	3,150	5	—N/a
5	Rúnar Eff Rúnarsson	"Mér við hlið"	4,096	2	Advanced
6	Aron Hannes Emilsson	"Nótt"	11,399	1	Advanced

Semi-final 2 – 4 March 2017
R/O	Artist	Song	Televote	Place	Result
1	Linda Hartmanns	"Ástfangin"	1,408	6	—N/a
2	Daði Freyr Pétursson	"Hvað með það?"	5,005	3	Advanced
3	Svala Björgvinsdóttir	"Ég veit það"	12,789	1	Advanced
4	Páll Rósinkranz and Kristina Bærendsen	"Þú og ég"	3,954	4	—N/a
5	Sólveig Ásgeirsdóttir	"Treystu á mig"	2,588	5	—N/a
6	Aron Brink	"Þú hefur dáleitt mig"	10,315	2	Advanced

===== Final =====
The final took place on 11 March 2017 where the seven entries that qualified from the preceding two semi-finals competed. In the semi-finals, all competing entries were required to be performed in Icelandic; however, entries competing in the final were required to be presented in the language they would compete with in the Eurovision Song Contest. All entries competed in English. In the first round of voting, votes from a seven-member international and Icelandic jury panel (50%) and public televoting (50%) determined the top two entries. The top two entries advanced to a second round of voting, the superfinal, where the winner, "Paper" performed by Svala Björgvinsdóttir, was determined solely by televoting.

The jury panel that voted in the first round consisted of:

- Andrea Gylfadóttir (Iceland) – singer
- Bruno Berberes (France) – television producer
- Julia Zemiro (Australia) – singer, television presenter
- Måns Zelmerlöw (Sweden) – singer-songwriter, television presenter, won Eurovision for Sweden in 2015
- Milica Fajgelj (Serbia) – music manager
- Snorri Helgason (Iceland) – singer
- Þórður Helgi Þórðarson (Iceland) – radio programmer

In addition to the performances of the competing artists, the interval acts featured guest performances by Alexander Rybak, who won Eurovision for Norway in 2009 with the song "Fairytale", and Måns Zelmerlöw.

Final – 11 March 2017
R/O	Artist	Song	Jury	Televote	Total	Place
1	Aron Hannes Emilsson	"Tonight"	14,604	17,552	32,156	3
2	Arnar Jónsson and Rakel Pálsdóttir	"Again"	18,095	4,816	22,911	5
3	Aron Brink	"Hypnotised"	11,111	14,205	25,316	4
4	Hildur Kristin Stefánsdóttir	"Bammbaramm"	11,111	2,977	14,088	7
5	Rúnar Eff Rúnarsson	"Make Your Way Back Home"	13,650	5,545	19,195	6
6	Svala Björgvinsdóttir	"Paper"	24,759	45,258	70,017	1
7	Daði Freyr Pétursson	"Is This Love?"	22,219	25,195	47,414	2

Detailed jury votes
R/O	Song	Juror							Total
R/O	Song	1	2	3	4	5	6	7	Total
1	"Tonight"	1,905	1,587	2,540	2,222	2,540	1,270	2,540	14,604
2	"Again"	2,540	3,809	1,905	3,174	1,905	2,540	2,222	18,095
3	"Hypnotised"	1,587	1,905	1,270	1,587	1,587	1,905	1,270	11,111
4	"Bammbaramm"	1,270	1,270	2,222	1,270	1,270	2,222	1,587	11,111
5	"Make Your Way Back Home"	2,222	2,222	1,587	1,905	2,222	1,587	1,905	13,650
6	"Paper"	3,809	2,540	3,174	3,809	3,809	3,809	3,809	24,759
7	"Is This Love"	3,174	3,174	3,809	2,540	3,174	3,174	3,174	22,219

Superfinal – 11 March 2017
R/O	Artist	Song	Televote	Place
1	Svala Björgvinsdóttir	"Paper"	79,570	1
2	Daði Freyr Pétursson	"Is This Love?"	47,722	2

== At Eurovision ==
According to Eurovision rules, all nations with the exceptions of the host country and the "Big Five" (France, Germany, Italy, Spain and the United Kingdom) are required to qualify from one of two semi-finals in order to compete for the final; the top ten countries from each semi-final progress to the final. The European Broadcasting Union (EBU) split up the competing countries into six different pots based on voting patterns from previous contests, with countries with favourable voting histories put into the same pot. On 31 January 2017, a special allocation draw was held which placed each country into one of the two semi-finals, as well as which half of the show they would perform in. Iceland was placed into the first semi-final, to be held on 9 May 2017, and was scheduled to perform in the second half of the show.

Once all the competing songs for the 2017 contest had been released, the running order for the semi-finals was decided by the shows' producers rather than through another draw, so that similar songs were not placed next to each other. Iceland was set to perform in position 13, following the entry from Moldova and before the entry from the Czech Republic.

The two semi-finals and the final were broadcast in Iceland on RÚV and Rás 2 with commentary by Gísli Marteinn Baldursson. The Icelandic spokesperson, who announced the top 12-point score awarded by the Icelandic jury during the final, was Bo Halldórsson who previously represented Iceland in 1995.

=== Semi-final ===
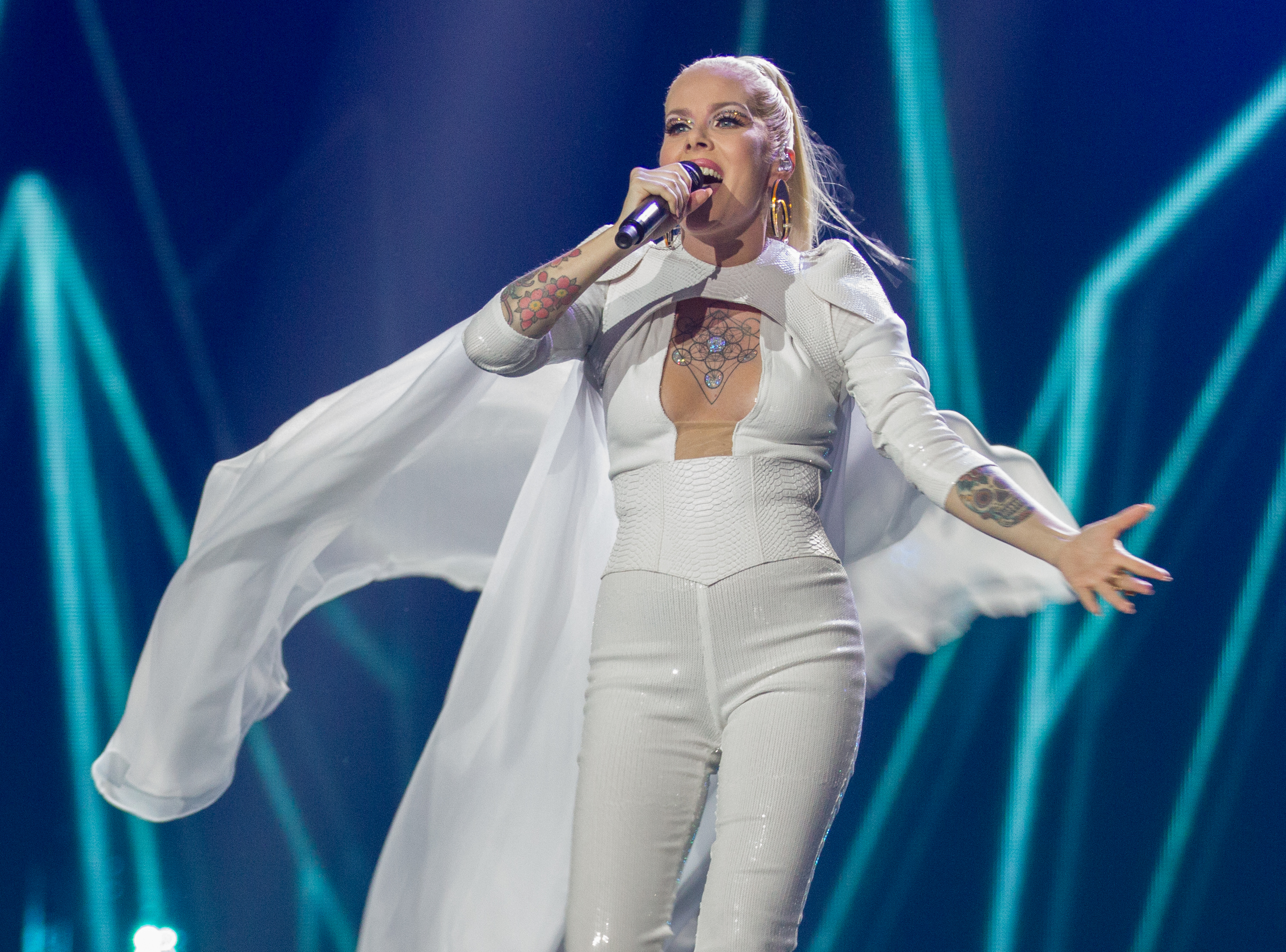
Svala during a rehearsal before the first semi-final

Svala took part in technical rehearsals on 1 and 4 May, followed by dress rehearsals on 8 and 9 May. This included the jury show on 8 May where the professional juries of each country watched and voted on the competing entries.

The Icelandic performance featured Svala dressed in a white outfit with a floor-length cape. The LED screens displayed white, blue and green lines and shapes with strobe lighting used during the performance, which also featured the use of a wind machine. Svala was joined by five off-stage backing vocalists: Anna Sigríður Snorradóttir, Fanny Kristín Tryggvadóttir, Hrönn Svansdóttir, Íris Guðmundsdóttir and Óskar Einarsson. All of them are members of the Reykjavík Gospel Company.

At the end of the show, Iceland was not announced among the top 10 entries in the first semi-final and therefore failed to qualify to compete in the final. It was later revealed that Iceland placed fourteenth in the semi-final, receiving a total of 60 points: 31 points from the televoting and 29 points from the juries.

=== Voting ===
Voting during the three shows involved each country awarding two sets of points from 1–8, 10 and 12: one from their professional jury and the other from televoting. Each nation's jury consisted of five music industry professionals who are citizens of the country they represent, with their names published before the contest to ensure transparency. This jury judged each entry based on: vocal capacity; the stage performance; the song's composition and originality; and the overall impression by the act. In addition, no member of a national jury was permitted to be related in any way to any of the competing acts in such a way that they cannot vote impartially and independently. The individual rankings of each jury member as well as the nation's televoting results were released shortly after the grand final.

Below is a breakdown of points awarded to Iceland and awarded by Iceland in the first semi-final and grand final of the contest, and the breakdown of the jury voting and televoting conducted during the two shows:

==== Points awarded to Iceland ====
Points awarded to Iceland (Semi-final 1)
Score	Televote	Jury
12 points		
10 points		
8 points		Latvia
7 points	Spain; Sweden	
6 points		
5 points	Finland	Finland
4 points	Albania; Latvia	
3 points		Armenia
2 points	United Kingdom	Australia; Azerbaijan; Belgium; Georgia; Moldova; Sweden
1 point	Georgia; Poland	Spain

==== Points awarded by Iceland ====
Points awarded by Iceland (Semi-final 1)
Score	Televote	Jury
12 points	Portugal	Portugal
10 points	Sweden	Australia
8 points	Moldova	Sweden
7 points	Belgium	Georgia
6 points	Australia	Azerbaijan
5 points	Poland	Czech Republic
4 points	Cyprus	Cyprus
3 points	Finland	Finland
2 points	Montenegro	Belgium
1 point	Latvia	Greece

Points awarded by Iceland (Final)
Score	Televote	Jury
12 points	Portugal	Portugal
10 points	Belgium	Australia
8 points	Sweden	Sweden
7 points	Italy	United Kingdom
6 points	Moldova	Bulgaria
5 points	Romania	Italy
4 points	Bulgaria	Hungary
3 points	Poland	Denmark
2 points	Hungary	Belgium
1 point	Norway	Norway

==== Detailed voting results ====
The following members comprised the Icelandic jury:

- Hildur Guðný (jury chairperson) – musician, music teacher
- Helga Möller – singer, represented Iceland in the 1986 contest as member of ICY
- Kristján Viðar Haraldsson (Viddi) – musician
- Pétur Örn Guðmundsson (Pétur Örn) – musician; writer of the 2013 Icelandic contest entry "Ég á líf"
- Stefanía Svavarsdóttir (Stefanía) – musician

Detailed voting results from Iceland (Semi-final 1)
R/O	Country	Jury							Televote	
R/O	Country	H. Möller	H. Guðný	Viddi	P. Örn	Stefanía	Rank	Points	Rank	Points
01	Sweden	5	3	4	8	5	3	8	2	10
02	Georgia	3	4	5	10	6	4	7	16	
03	Australia	7	5	2	3	2	2	10	5	6
04	Albania	13	8	15	11	16	14		15	
05	Belgium	6	9	12	4	12	9	2	4	7
06	Montenegro	16	16	17	17	13	16		9	2
07	Finland	8	11	11	2	11	8	3	8	3
08	Azerbaijan	2	6	10	5	10	5	6	14	
09	Portugal	1	1	1	1	1	1	12	1	12
10	Greece	9	13	8	7	8	10	1	11	
11	Poland	11	14	9	14	3	12		6	5
12	Moldova	12	10	6	13	9	11		3	8
13	Iceland									
14	Czech Republic	4	2	3	12	14	6	5	13	
15	Cyprus	10	7	7	6	7	7	4	7	4
16	Armenia	14	15	14	9	4	13		12	
17	Slovenia	15	12	13	15	17	15		17	
18	Latvia	17	17	16	16	15	17		10	1

Detailed voting results from Iceland (Final)
R/O	Country	Jury							Televote	
R/O	Country	H. Möller	H. Guðný	Viddi	P. Örn	Stefanía	Rank	Points	Rank	Points
01	Israel	20	21	10	24	5	18		21	
02	Poland	16	16	12	11	15	13		8	3
03	Belarus	17	12	11	19	19	17		15	
04	Austria	9	9	19	7	16	11		18	
05	Armenia	14	23	20	14	10	19		22	
06	Netherlands	8	11	21	17	17	16		17	
07	Moldova	19	13	7	12	13	12		5	6
08	Hungary	11	7	5	18	4	7	4	9	2
09	Italy	4	2	8	3	14	6	5	4	7
10	Denmark	3	15	9	16	7	8	3	12	
11	Portugal	1	1	1	1	1	1	12	1	12
12	Azerbaijan	12	14	22	15	11	15		20	
13	Croatia	26	26	17	26	23	25		19	
14	Australia	6	4	2	4	3	2	10	11	
15	Greece	18	19	15	13	18	20		24	
16	Spain	22	17	25	22	26	23		23	
17	Norway	7	18	14	9	12	10	1	10	1
18	United Kingdom	10	5	3	2	6	4	7	16	
19	Cyprus	21	8	16	6	20	14		13	
20	Romania	15	24	13	25	21	21		6	5
21	Germany	24	20	23	21	24	22		25	
22	Ukraine	25	22	26	23	25	26		26	
23	Belgium	13	10	18	8	9	9	2	2	10
24	Sweden	5	3	4	10	2	3	8	3	8
25	Bulgaria	2	6	6	5	8	5	6	7	4
26	France	23	25	24	20	22	24		14	
