= Greece in the Eurovision Song Contest 2017 =

- Eurovision Song Contest 2017
- Participating broadcaster: Hellenic Broadcasting Corporation (ERT)
- Country: Greece
- Selection process: Artist: Internal selection Song: Ellinikós Telikós 2017
- Selection date: Artist: 13 January 2017; Song: 6 March 2017

Competing entry
- Song: "This Is Love"
- Artist: Demy
- Songwriters: Dimitris Kontopoulos; Romy Papadea; John Ballard

Placement
- Semi-final result: Qualified (10th, 115 points)
- Final result: 19th, 77 points

Participation chronology

Greece was represented at the Eurovision Song Contest 2017 with the song "This Is Love", written by Dimitris Kontopoulos, Romy Papadea, and John Ballard, and performed by Demy. The Greek participating broadcaster, the Hellenic Broadcasting Corporation (ERT), selected its entry through a national final, after having previously selected the performer internally. Demy was announced at the Greek representative on 13 January 2017. Three songs competed in the national final on 6 March 2017 and a combination of international jury voting and public voting selected "This Is Love" as the winning song.

Greece was drawn to compete in the first semi-final of the Eurovision Song Contest, which took place on 9 May 2017. Performing 10th during the show, "This Is Love" was announced among the top 10 entries of the first semi-final and therefore qualified to compete in the final on 13 May. It was later revealed that Greece placed tenth out of the 18 participating countries in the semi-final with 115 points. In the final, Greece performed 15th and placed 19th out of the 26 participating countries, scoring 77 points.

== Background ==
Prior to the 2017 contest, Greece had participated in the Eurovision Song Contest 37 times since their debut in 1974. To this point, they won the contest once, in 2005 with the song "My Number One" performed by Helena Paparizou. Following the introduction of semi-finals for the 2004 contest, Greece managed to qualify for the final with each of their entries for several years. Between 2004 and 2013, the nation achieved nine top ten placements in the final. "Utopian Land" by Argo in 2016 failed to qualify the nation to the final for the first time ever, marking Greece's worst result at the contest and leading to their absence from the final for the first time since 2000, a contest they did not take part in.

As part of its duties as participating broadcaster, the Hellenic Broadcasting Corporation (ERT) organises the selection of its entry in the Eurovision Song Contest and broadcasts the event in the country. ERT's predecessor, the National Radio Television Foundation (EIRT), debuted in the contest in 1974 and then ERT participated from 1975 until 2013, when it was shut down by a government directive and replaced firstly with the interim Dimosia Tileorasi (DT) and then later by the New Hellenic Radio, Internet and Television (NERIT) broadcaster. Following the victory of the Syriza party at the January 2015 Greek legislative election, the Hellenic Parliament re-instated ERT as the public Greek broadcaster by renaming NERIT to ERT, which began broadcasting in June 2015. ERT confirmed its intentions to participate at the 2017 contest on 7 October 2016. The Greek broadcaster has used various methods to select its entry in the past, such as internal selections and televised national finals to choose the performer, song or both to compete at Eurovision. For the first time since 2009, ERT opted to internally select their entrant with the song determined through a public process.

== Before Eurovision ==
=== Artist selection ===
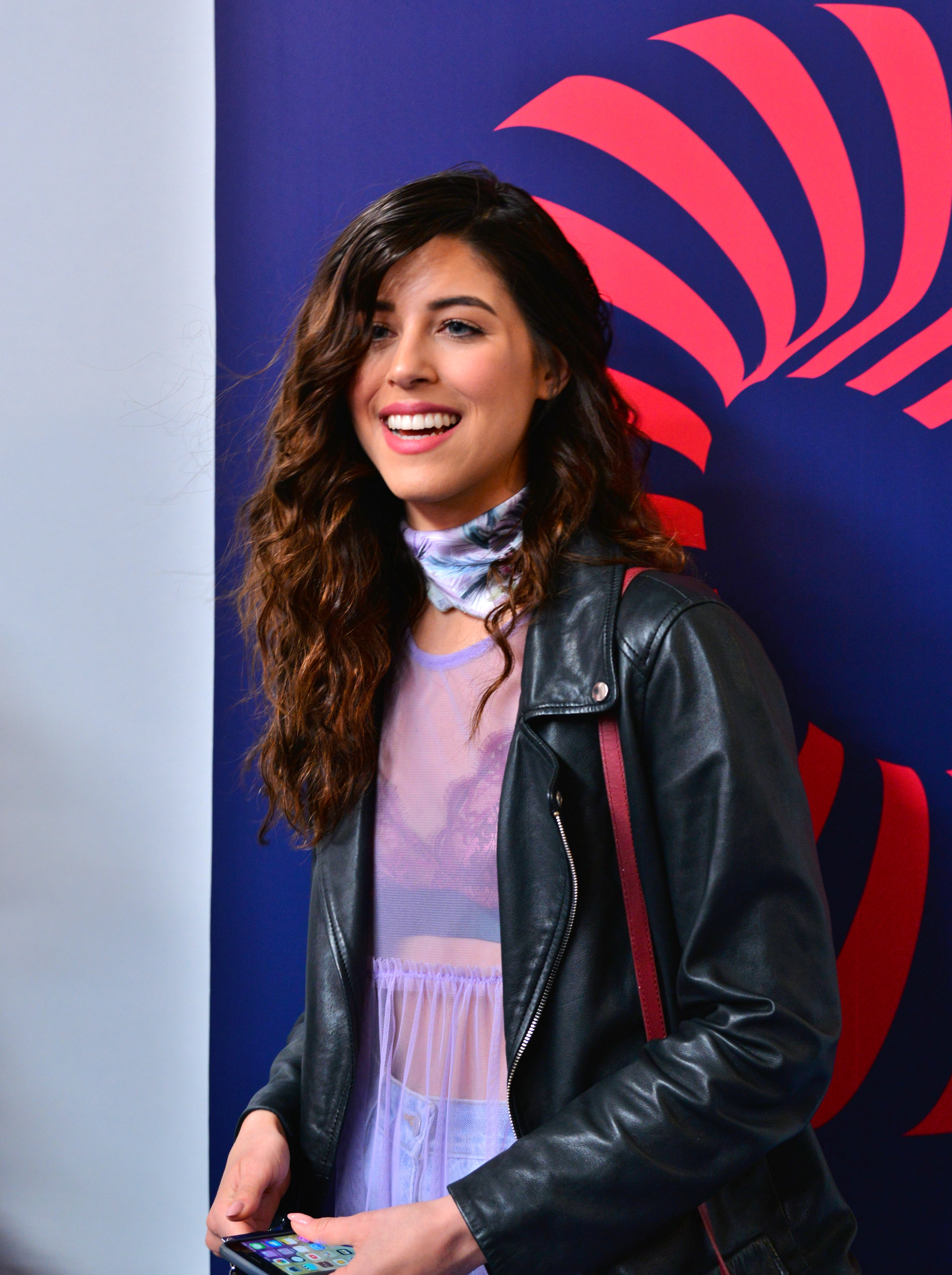
Demy was internally selected by ERT to represent Greece in the Eurovision Song Contest 2017.

On 5 January 2017, news website NewsIt reported that the Hellenic Broadcasting Corporation (ERT) had asked both Demy and Stereo Soul to submit songs for consideration to represent the nation at the Eurovision Song Contest 2017. Previously the broadcaster had said that they would select the entry internally, however, they reconsidered, seeing the Greek selection event Ellinikós Telikós as a revenue source. Demy was subsequently announced as the Greek representative on 13 January 2017, with her song to be selected through a three-song national final.

=== Ellinikós Telikós 2017 ===
ERT used the national final Ellinikós Telikós 2017 to select Demy's song for the Eurovision Song Contest 2017. Three songs, all written by Dimitris Kontopoulos, were selected to participate in the national final; their titles were revealed by MAD TV on 28 February 2017. Music videos for the competing songs were filmed in Greece and in Odesa, Ukraine, and were presented during the national final on 6 March 2017. A demo version and accompanying music video of candidate song "This Is Love" were leaked online on 2 March in the days leading up to the final; however, ERT opted to allow for the national final to continue as planned. The show, held at ERT's studio in Athens and hosted by Elena Bouzala and Antonis Loudaros, was televised on ERT1, ERT HD, and ERT World as well as streamed online via the ERT website ert.gr.

The winning song, "This Is Love", was selected by a combination of public voting (70%) and international jury voting (30%). Public voting was conducted through telephone or SMS, while the international jury consisted of members of Greek diaspora communities from nine European cities. In addition to the presentation of the competing songs, the interval act featured guest performances by 2017 Cypriot Eurovision entrant Hovig and 2017 Moldovan Eurovision entrant SunStroke Project. Former Eurovision contestants Sergey Lazarev, Helena Paparizou, Ani Lorak, and Sakis Rouvas also appeared on screen during the event wishing Demy well. The national final received a market share of 7%, which was low compared to previous Greek national finals.

Ellinikós Telikós 2017 – 6 March 2017
R/O	Song	Songwriter(s)	Jury (30%)	Televote (70%)	Total	Place
1	"Angels"	Dimitris Kontopoulos, Romy Papadea	0%	12%	8.4%	3
2	"This Is Love"	Dimitris Kontopoulos, Romy Papadea, John Ballard	89%	70%	75.7%	1
3	"When the Morning Comes Around"	Dimitris Kontopoulos, John Ballard	11%	18%	15.9%	2

Detailed international jury votes
R/O	Song	Brussels	Tbilisi	Baku	Nuremberg	Yerevan	Milan	Munich	Vienna	Mariupol	Total	Percentage
1	"Angels"										0	0%
2	"This Is Love"	X	X		X	X	X	X	X	X	8	89%
3	"When the Morning Comes Around"			X							1	11%

=== Preparations and promotion ===
Following the selection of "This Is Love" as the Greek entry on 6 March 2017, the music video for the song was uploaded to the official Eurovision Song Contest YouTube account, though it was removed shortly after to allow time for a revamped version to be created. Both the final version of the song and its accompanying music video were revealed on 13 March. For the final version, the song underwent changes to its instrumentation and lyrics during the chorus. A Greek language version was later created and released in late April 2017 under the name "Oso Zo". Demy did not partake in the annual Eurovision preview shows across Europe, instead performing the song in Greece on ANT1's show Rising Star and at the MAD TV MADWalk fashion show on 21 April. Internationally, Capitol Music Sweden promoted the song throughout Sweden, Norway, Denmark, and Finland.

== At Eurovision ==
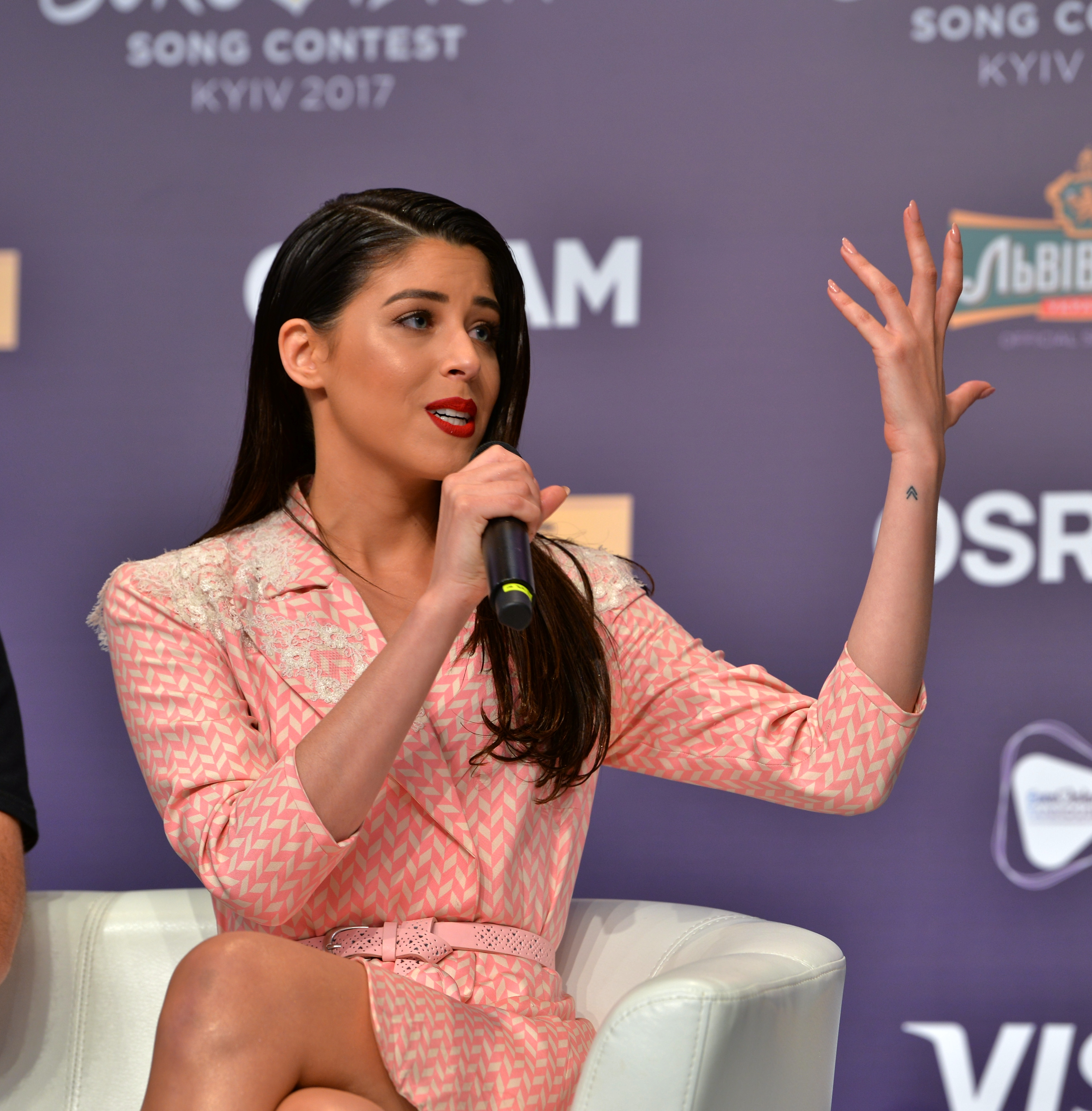
Demy during a press meet and greet

The Eurovision Song Contest 2017 took place at the International Exhibition Centre in Kyiv, Ukraine. It consisted of two semi-finals held on 9 and 11 May, respectively, and the final on 13 May 2017. According to Eurovision rules, all nations with the exceptions of the host country and the "Big Five" (France, Germany, Italy, Spain, and the United Kingdom) are required to qualify from one of two semi-finals in order to compete for the final; the top ten countries from each semi-final progress to the final. The European Broadcasting Union (EBU) split up the competing countries into six different pots based on voting patterns from previous contests, with countries with favourable voting histories put into the same pot. On 31 January 2017, an allocation draw was held which placed each country into one of the two semi-finals and determined which half of the show they would perform in. Greece was placed into the first semi-final, to be held on 9 May 2017, and was scheduled to perform in the second half of the show.

Once all the competing songs for the 2017 contest had been released, the running order for the semi-finals was decided by the shows' producers rather than through another draw, so that similar songs were not placed next to each other. Greece was set to perform in position 10, following the entry from Portugal and before the entry from Poland. The two semi-finals and the final were televised in Greece on ERT1, ERT HD and ERT World as well as broadcast via radio on ERA 2 and Voice of Greece with commentary by Maria Kozakou and Giorgos Kapoutzidis.

=== Performances ===
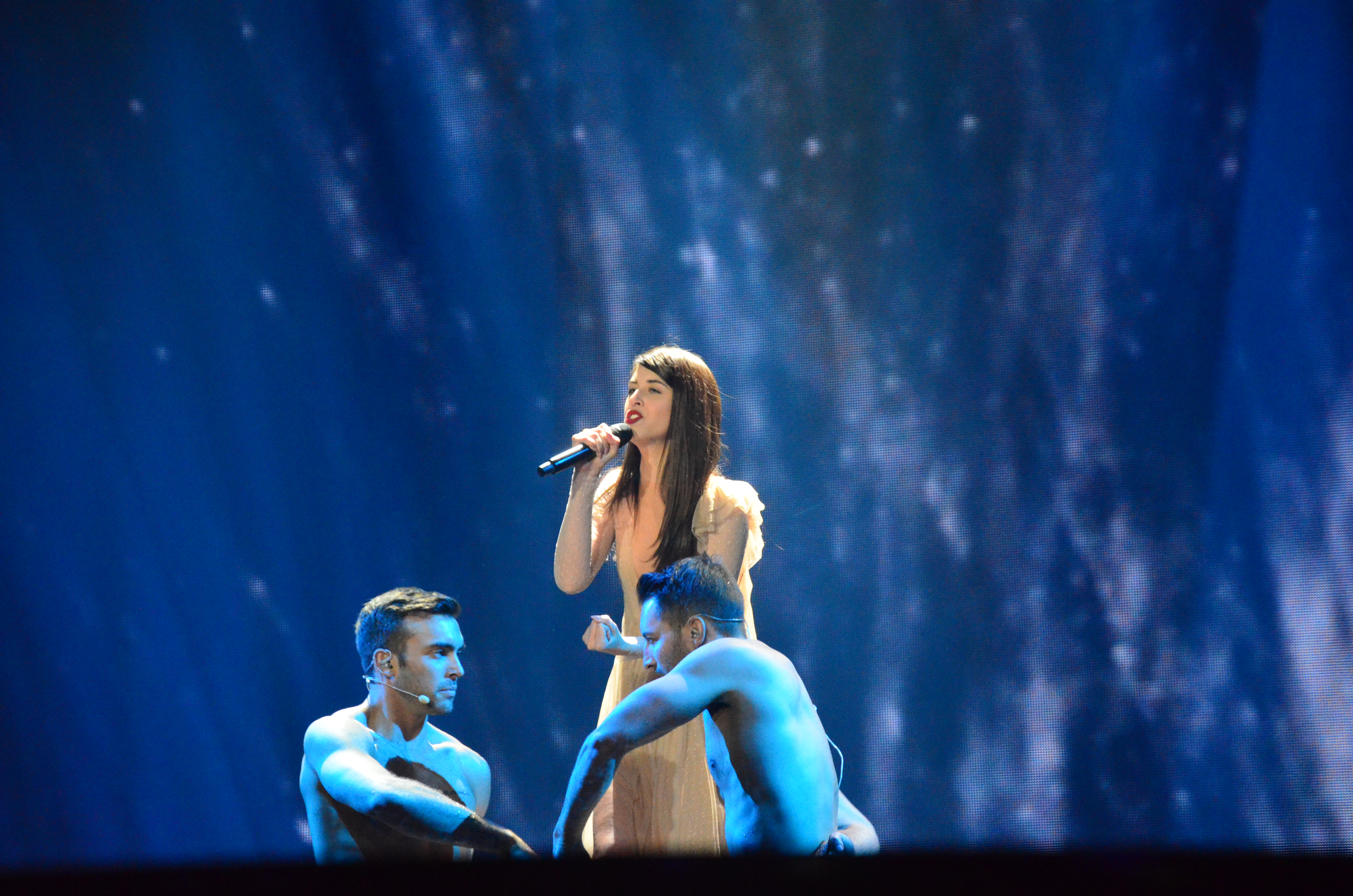
Demy during a rehearsal before the first semi-final

Demy took part in technical rehearsals on 1 and 4 May, followed by dress rehearsals on 8 and 9 May. This included the jury show on 8 May where the professional juries of each country watched and voted on the competing entries. The Greek performance featured Demy wearing a soft gold dress and performing together on stage with two dancers in nude-coloured shorts playing with water. The stage presentation featured Demy standing on a leveled podium and a hologram screen that appeared in front of the singer during the performance with the LED screens projecting a dark blue background with white and gold raindrops. The performance was choreographed by stage director Fokas Evangelinos. Demy was joined by three off-stage backing vocalists: Erasmia Markidi, Evgenia Liakou, and Paris Paraskevadis-Planets. The two dancers that performed with Demy on stage were Iasonas Mandilas and Marcus Giakoumoglou. At the end of the show, Greece was announced as having finished in the top 10 and subsequently qualifying for the final. It was later revealed that Greece placed tenth in the semi-final, receiving a total of 115 points: 54 points from the televoting and 61 points from the juries.

Shortly after the second semi-final, a winners' press conference was held for the ten qualifying countries. As part of this press conference, the qualifying artists took part in a draw to determine which half of the final they would subsequently participate in. Greece was drawn to compete in the second half. Following this draw, the shows' producers decided upon the running order of the final, as they had done for the semi-finals. Greece was subsequently placed to perform in position 15, following the entry from Australia and before the entry from Spain. Demy once again took part in dress rehearsals on 12 and 13 May before the final, including the jury final where the professional juries cast their final votes before the live show. At the 13 May final, Greece placed 19th, scoring 77 points: 29 points from the televoting and 48 points from the juries.

=== Voting ===
Voting during the three shows involved each country awarding two sets of points from 1-8, 10, and 12: one from their professional jury and the other from televoting. Each nation's jury consisted of five music industry professionals who are citizens of the country they represent, with their names published before the contest to ensure transparency. This jury judged each entry based on: vocal capacity; the stage performance; the song's composition and originality; and the overall impression of the act. In addition, no member of a national jury was permitted to be related in any way to any of the competing acts in such a way that they cannot vote impartially and independently. The individual rankings of each jury member as well as the nation's televoting results were released shortly after the final. Greece's jury consisted of Vicky Gerotheodorou (jury chairperson), Xenia Ghali, Dimitris Ouggarezos, Akis Anastasiadis, and Aris Petrakis. The Greek spokesperson, who announced the top 12-point score awarded by the Greek jury during the final, was Constantinos Christoforou, who previously represented Cyprus at the Eurovision Song Contest as a solo artist in 1996 and 2005 as well as in 2002 as part of the boy band One. Below is a breakdown of points awarded to Greece and awarded by Greece in both the first semi-final and the final of the contest, and the breakdown of the jury voting and televoting conducted during the two shows.

==== Points awarded to Greece ====
Points awarded to Greece (Semi-final 1)
Score	Televote	Jury
12 points	Cyprus	Cyprus; Montenegro
10 points		Armenia
8 points		Albania
7 points		Moldova
6 points	Albania; Belgium	Spain
5 points	Armenia; Portugal; United Kingdom	
4 points	Italy; Montenegro	
3 points	Australia	
2 points	Georgia; Poland	Poland; Portugal
1 point		Australia; Iceland

Points awarded to Greece (Final)
Score	Televote	Jury
12 points	Cyprus	Cyprus; Montenegro
10 points		Armenia
8 points		
7 points	Moldova	
6 points		Bulgaria
5 points	Bulgaria	Azerbaijan
4 points		
3 points	Albania	
2 points		Spain
1 point	Armenia; Romania	Albania

==== Points awarded by Greece ====
Points awarded by Greece (Semi-final 1)
Score	Televote	Jury
12 points	Cyprus	Armenia
10 points	Portugal	Albania
8 points	Armenia	Azerbaijan
7 points	Moldova	Montenegro
6 points	Georgia	Cyprus
5 points	Albania	Portugal
4 points	Belgium	Georgia
3 points	Sweden	Moldova
2 points	Poland	Sweden
1 point	Finland	Belgium

Points awarded by Greece (Final)
Score	Televote	Jury
12 points	Cyprus	Cyprus
10 points	Bulgaria	Azerbaijan
8 points	Portugal	Armenia
7 points	Italy	Moldova
6 points	Moldova	Romania
5 points	Belgium	Portugal
4 points	France	Italy
3 points	Sweden	Belarus
2 points	Armenia	Bulgaria
1 point	Romania	United Kingdom

==== Detailed voting results ====
The following members comprised the Greek jury:

- Vicky Gerotheodorou (jury chairperson) – lyricist
- Xenia Ghali – composer and producer
- Dimitris Ouggarezos – radio producer
- Akis Anastasiadis – music producer
- Aris Petrakis – performer

Detailed voting results from Greece (Semi-final 1)
R/O	Country	Jury							Televote	
R/O	Country	X. Ghali	V. Gerothodorou	D. Ouggarezos	A. Anastadiadis	A. Petrakis	Rank	Points	Rank	Points
01	Sweden	1	1	12	16	12	9	2	8	3
02	Georgia	8	9	8	6	9	7	4	5	6
03	Australia	9	5	11	11	11	11		13	
04	Albania	6	3	5	4	5	2	10	6	5
05	Belgium	17	11	14	2	2	10	1	7	4
06	Montenegro	5	6	6	3	6	4	7	16	
07	Finland	14	10	10	8	13	13		10	1
08	Azerbaijan	2	4	4	7	7	3	8	11	
09	Portugal	11	14	1	12	1	6	5	2	10
10	Greece									
11	Poland	10	15	13	9	10	14		9	2
12	Moldova	12	8	7	5	8	8	3	4	7
13	Iceland	15	17	16	17	17	17		14	
14	Czech Republic	13	13	17	14	15	15		17	
15	Cyprus	3	7	2	15	4	5	6	1	12
16	Armenia	7	2	3	1	3	1	12	3	8
17	Slovenia	16	16	15	13	16	16		12	
18	Latvia	4	12	9	10	14	12		15	

Detailed voting results from Greece (Final)
R/O	Country	Jury							Televote	
R/O	Country	X. Ghali	V. Gerothodorou	D. Ouggarezos	A. Anastadiadis	A. Petrakis	Rank	Points	Rank	Points
01	Israel	18	21	20	25	19	24		16	
02	Poland	17	22	22	19	20	22		14	
03	Belarus	12	11	8	11	7	8	3	25	
04	Austria	16	16	15	10	9	14		20	
05	Armenia	9	7	9	2	3	3	8	9	2
06	Netherlands	25	25	3	18	23	19		18	
07	Moldova	7	8	6	4	6	4	7	5	6
08	Hungary	23	14	21	17	21	21		11	
09	Italy	11	1	13	9	14	7	4	4	7
10	Denmark	22	19	23	7	13	18		19	
11	Portugal	8	15	2	16	1	6	5	3	8
12	Azerbaijan	3	4	4	3	5	2	10	17	
13	Croatia	21	13	12	12	25	17		13	
14	Australia	19	10	19	6	12	15		15	
15	Greece									
16	Spain	20	17	17	24	22	23		24	
17	Norway	14	18	18	21	10	16		21	
18	United Kingdom	10	2	10	14	15	10	1	12	
19	Cyprus	1	6	1	8	2	1	12	1	12
20	Romania	6	9	5	5	8	5	6	10	1
21	Germany	24	24	25	22	24	25		23	
22	Ukraine	15	20	24	20	17	20		22	
23	Belgium	13	12	11	13	4	12		6	5
24	Sweden	4	3	14	15	16	11		8	3
25	Bulgaria	5	5	7	23	11	9	2	2	10
26	France	2	23	16	1	18	13		7	4
