= Czech Republic in the Eurovision Song Contest 2017 =

- Eurovision Song Contest 2017
- Participating broadcaster: Czech Television (ČT)
- Country: Czech Republic
- Selection process: Internal selection
- Announcement date: Artist: 15 February 2017; Song: 7 March 2017

Competing entry
- Song: "My Turn"
- Artist: Martina Bárta
- Songwriters: DWB; Kyler Niko

Placement
- Semi-final result: Failed to qualify (13th)

Participation chronology

The Czech Republic was represented at the Eurovision Song Contest 2017 with the song "My Turn" written by DWB and Kyler Niko. The song was performed by Martina Bárta, who was internally selected by the Czech broadcaster Česká televize (ČT) to represent the nation at the 2017 contest in Kyiv, Ukraine. Bárta was announced as the Czech representative on 15 February 2017, while the song "My Turn" was presented to the public on 7 March 2017.

Czech Republic was drawn to compete in the first semi-final of the Eurovision Song Contest which took place on 9 May 2017. Performing during the show in position 14, "My Turn" was not announced among the top 10 entries of the first semi-final and therefore did not qualify to compete in the final. It was later revealed that Czech Republic placed thirteenth out of the 18 participating countries in the semi-final with 83 points.

== Background ==
Prior to the 2017 contest, the Czech Republic had participated in the Eurovision Song Contest five times since its first entry in 2007. The nation competed in the contest on three consecutive occasions between 2007 and 2009 without qualifying to the final: in 2007 Kabát performing "Malá dáma" placed 28th (last) in the semi-final achieving only one point, in 2008 Tereza Kerndlová performing "Have Some Fun" placed 18th (second to last) in her semi-final scoring nine points and in 2009 Gipsy.cz performing the song "Aven Romale" placed 18th (last) in their semi-final failing to score any points. The Czech broadcaster withdrew from the contest between 2010 and 2014 citing reasons such as low viewing figures and poor results for their absence, and returned to the contest in 2015, once again failing to qualify to the final with the song "Hope Never Dies" performed by Marta Jandová and Václav Noid Bárta. In 2016, Czech Republic managed to qualify for the final for the first time, placing 25th with Gabriela Gunčíková and the song "I Stand".

The Czech national broadcaster, Česká televize (ČT), broadcasts the event within Czech Republic and organises the selection process for the nation's entry. The broadcaster has used both national finals and internal selections to select the Czech Eurovision entry in the past. ČT confirmed their intentions to participate at the 2017 Eurovision Song Contest in September 2016, while also confirming that the Czech entry for the 2017 contest would be selected internally.

== Before Eurovision ==
=== Internal selection ===
ČT announced in September 2016 that the Czech entry for the Eurovision Song Contest 2017 would be selected internally. Composers were able to submit their proposals to the broadcaster between 15 September 2016 and 30 November 2016, and Czech Head of Delegation for the Eurovision Song Contest Jan Bors revealed on 1 December 2016 the broadcaster received over 300 submissions at the closing of the deadline. In early January 2017, it was announced that five entries had been shortlisted and matched with potential singers, and that a decision regarding which entry would be selected would be made in February.

On 15 February 2017, ČT announced that Martina Bárta would represent the Czech Republic in Kyiv, while the song "My Turn", which was written by the British team DWB (Paul Drew, Greig Watts and Pete Barringer) together with Kyler Niko, was announced as the Czech entry for the 2017 Eurovision Song Contest. Bárta and the song were selected by ČT together with a five-member jury consisting of conductor and composer Martin Kumžák, singer, producer and composer Jiří Škorpík, composer Michal Dvořák, composer and singer Michal Pavlíček, and musician, composer and conductor Ota Balage. The performer for "My Turn" was originally intended to be singer Dasha, however her manager Martin Kumžák did not allow her to participate and instead suggested Martina Bárta, who was ultimately selected from five potential artists. The song was released on 7 March 2017, while the official music video was presented to the public on 13 March 2017.

=== Promotion ===
Martina Bárta made several appearances across Europe to specifically promote "My Turn" as the Czech Eurovision entry. On 25 March, Bárta performed during the Eurovision PreParty Riga, which was organised by OGAE Latvia and held at the Crystal Club Concert Hall in Riga. On 2 April, Bárta performed during the London Eurovision Party, which was held at the Café de Paris venue in London and hosted by Nicki French and Paddy O'Connell. Between 3 and 6 April, Bárta took part in promotional activities in Tel Aviv, Israel where she performed during the Israel Calling event held at the Ha'teatron venue. On 8 April, Bárta performed during the Eurovision in Concert event which was held at the Melkweg venue in Amsterdam, Netherlands and hosted by Cornald Maas and Selma Björnsdóttir. On 15 April, Bárta performed during the Eurovision Spain Pre-Party, which was held at the Sala La Riviera venue in Madrid, Spain. On 20 April, Martina Bárta performed during the Eurovision Meets Jazz event, which took place at the Jazz Dock in Prague.

== At Eurovision ==
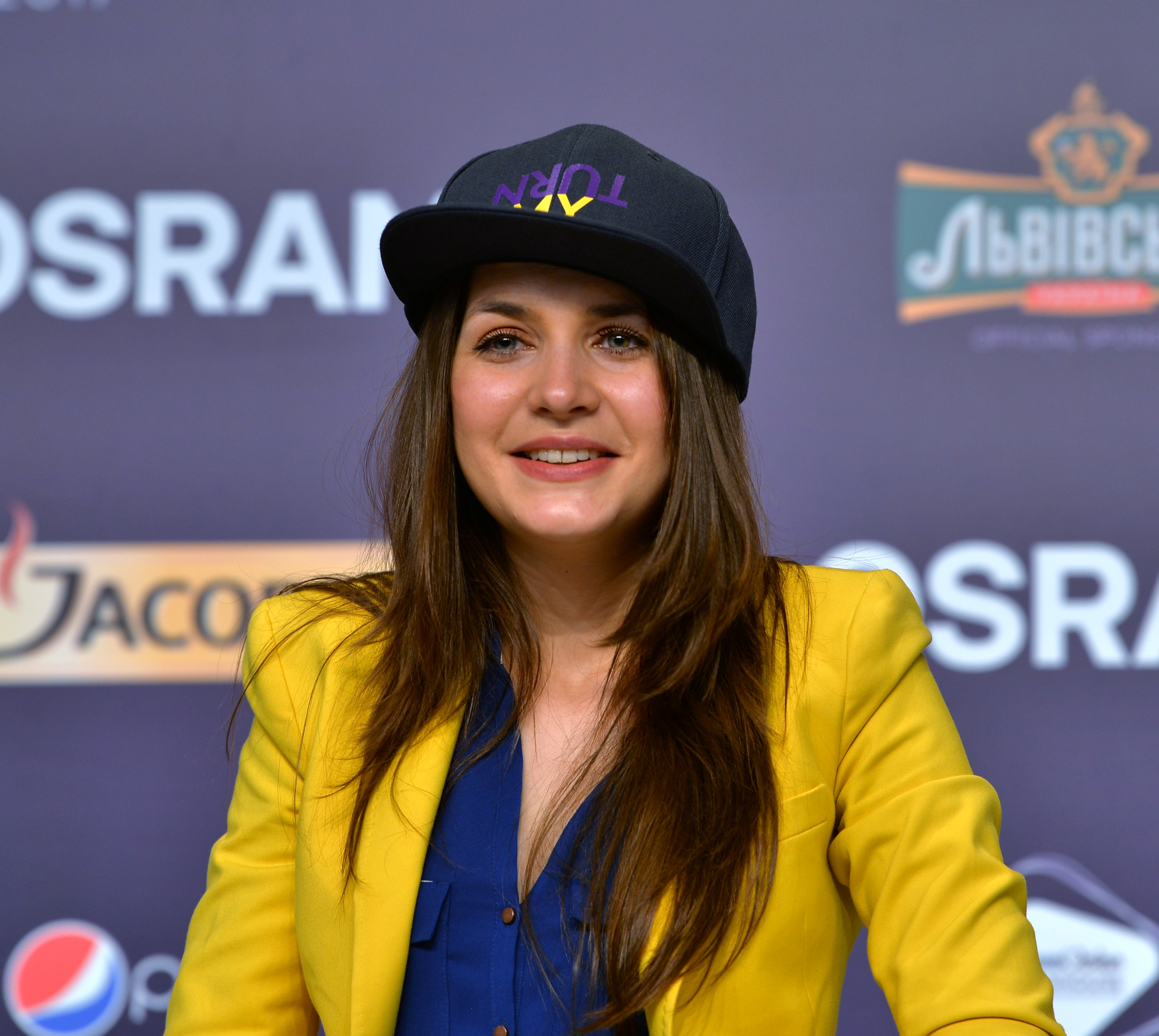
Martina Bárta during a press meet and greet

According to Eurovision rules, all nations with the exceptions of the host country and the "Big Five" (France, Germany, Italy, Spain and the United Kingdom) are required to qualify from one of two semi-finals in order to compete for the final; the top ten countries from each semi-final progress to the final. The European Broadcasting Union (EBU) split up the competing countries into six different pots based on voting patterns from previous contests, with countries with favourable voting histories put into the same pot. On 31 January 2017, a special allocation draw was held which placed each country into one of the two semi-finals, as well as which half of the show they would perform in. The Czech Republic was placed into the first semi-final, to be held on 9 May 2017, and was scheduled to perform in the second half of the show.

Once all the competing songs for the 2017 contest had been released, the running order for the semi-finals was decided by the shows' producers rather than through another draw, so that similar songs were not placed next to each other. The Czech Republic was set to perform in position 14, following the entry from Iceland and before the entry from Cyprus.

In the Czech Republic, the semi-finals were broadcast on ČT2 and the final was broadcast on ČT1. All three shows featured commentary by Libor Bouček, who was joined by Martina Bárta for the final. The Czech spokesperson, who will announce the top 12-point score awarded by the Czech jury during the final, was Radka Rosická.

=== Semi-final ===
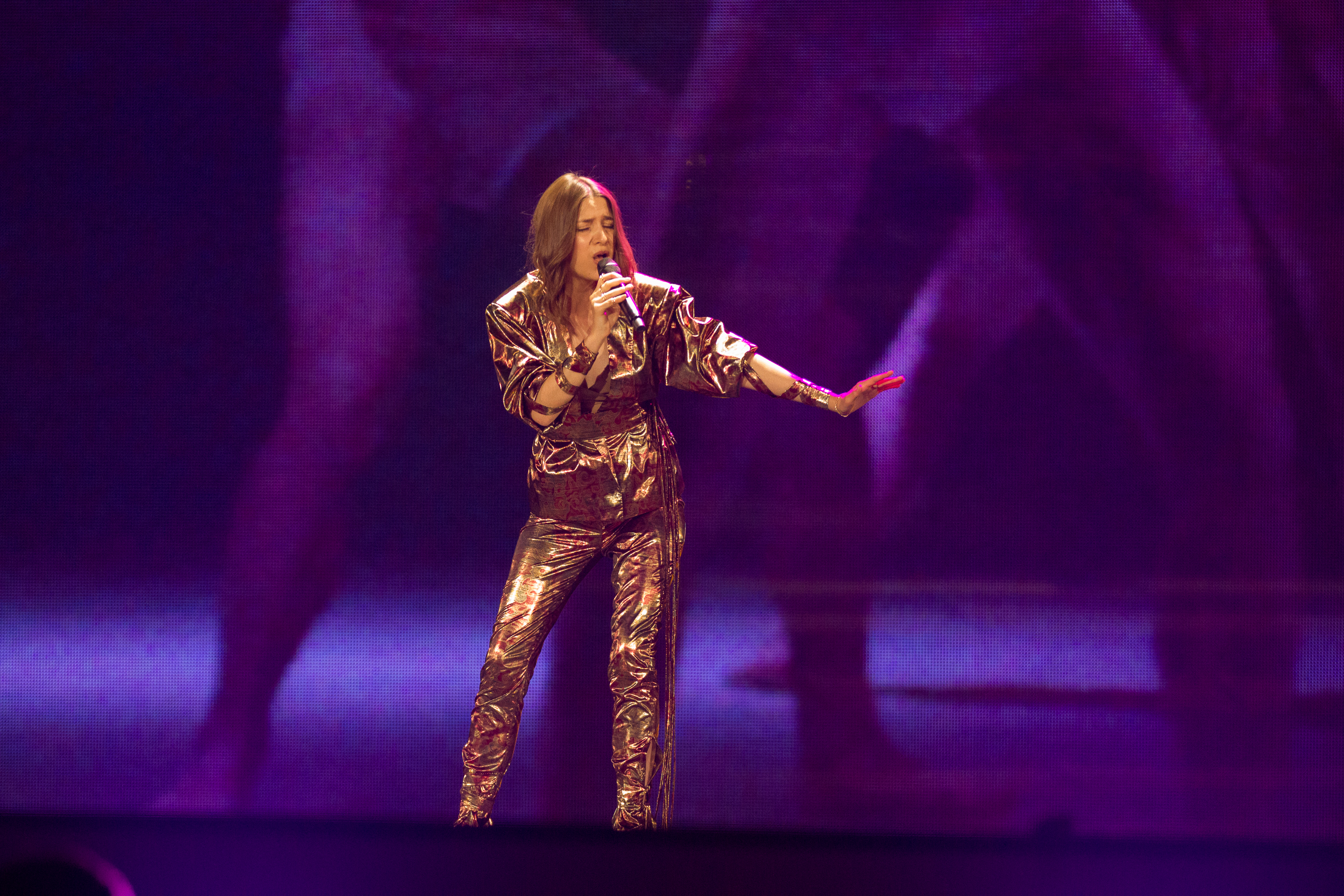
Martina Bárta during a rehearsal before the first semi-final

Martina Bárta took part in technical rehearsals on 1 and 4 May, followed by dress rehearsals on 8 and 9 May. This included the jury show on 8 May where the professional juries of each country watched and voted on the competing entries.

The Czech performance featured Martina Bárta appearing alone on stage wearing a deep-cut golden metallic jumpsuit designed by Zoltán Tóth. The performance began with Bárta sitting at the back of the stage, which she later stood up and walked down a yellow brick road displayed on the LED floor to the front of the stage. The LED screens displayed pink, purple and gold colours as well as images from the music video of "My Turn". Four off-stage backing vocalists performed with Bárta: Marta Kloučková, Michal Strnad, Štěpán Janoušek and Veronika Vítová.

At the end of the show, the Czech Republic was not announced among the top 10 entries in the first semi-final and therefore failed to qualify to compete in the final. It was later revealed that Czech Republic placed thirteenth in the semi-final, receiving a total of 83 points: 2 points from the televoting and 81 points from the juries.

=== Voting ===
Voting during the three shows involved each country awarding two sets of points from 1-8, 10 and 12: one from their professional jury and the other from televoting. Each nation's jury consisted of five music industry professionals who are citizens of the country they represent, with their names published before the contest to ensure transparency. This jury judged each entry based on: vocal capacity; the stage performance; the song's composition and originality; and the overall impression by the act. In addition, no member of a national jury was permitted to be related in any way to any of the competing acts in such a way that they cannot vote impartially and independently. The individual rankings of each jury member as well as the nation's televoting results were released shortly after the grand final.

Below is a breakdown of points awarded to the Czech Republic and awarded by the Czech Republic in the first semi-final and grand final of the contest, and the breakdown of the jury voting and televoting conducted during the two shows:

==== Points awarded to the Czech Republic ====
Points awarded to the Czech Republic (Semi-final 1)
Score	Televote	Jury
12 points		Portugal
10 points		Slovenia; Spain
8 points		United Kingdom
7 points		Latvia
6 points		Belgium
5 points		Iceland
4 points		Armenia; Australia; Azerbaijan; Sweden
3 points		Poland
2 points	Portugal	Montenegro
1 point		Cyprus; Georgia

==== Points awarded by the Czech Republic ====
Points awarded by the Czech Republic (Semi-final 1)
Score	Televote	Jury
12 points	Azerbaijan	Australia
10 points	Moldova	Sweden
8 points	Poland	Poland
7 points	Portugal	Portugal
6 points	Belgium	Moldova
5 points	Armenia	Cyprus
4 points	Cyprus	Azerbaijan
3 points	Finland	Belgium
2 points	Sweden	Montenegro
1 point	Slovenia	Finland

Points awarded by the Czech Republic (Final)
Score	Televote	Jury
12 points	Bulgaria	Portugal
10 points	Azerbaijan	Australia
8 points	Portugal	Netherlands
7 points	Ukraine	Sweden
6 points	Romania	Denmark
5 points	Moldova	United Kingdom
4 points	Belgium	Austria
3 points	Belarus	Moldova
2 points	Armenia	Bulgaria
1 point	Italy	Poland

==== Detailed voting results ====
The following members comprised the Czech jury:

- Janis Sidovský (jury chairperson) – producer
- Eddie Stoilow – music producer
- Elis Mraz – singer, composer, songwriter, music producer
- Kateřina Říhová – creative manager, Ocko TV host
- Lucie Dvořáková (DJ Lucca) – DJ, producer (jury member in semi-final 1)
- Karel Hodr – music editor (jury member in the final)

Detailed voting results from the Czech Republic (Semi-final 1)
R/O	Country	Jury							Televote	
R/O	Country	J. Sidovský	E. Stoilow	DJ Lucca	E. Mraz	K. Říhová	Rank	Points	Rank	Points
01	Sweden	2	2	1	3	1	2	10	9	2
02	Georgia	13	9	14	9	17	14		16	
03	Australia	1	1	3	1	3	1	12	12	
04	Albania	14	13	15	13	16	16		15	
05	Belgium	6	14	8	10	11	8	3	5	6
06	Montenegro	7	15	16	6	7	9	2	17	
07	Finland	11	11	9	8	12	10	1	8	3
08	Azerbaijan	8	16	6	7	6	7	4	1	12
09	Portugal	3	8	4	4	2	4	7	4	7
10	Greece	10	17	5	14	10	12		11	
11	Poland	5	4	2	2	4	3	8	3	8
12	Moldova	9	5	10	5	5	5	6	2	10
13	Iceland	17	6	13	11	8	11		13	
14	Czech Republic									
15	Cyprus	4	3	7	12	15	6	5	7	4
16	Armenia	12	12	11	15	13	15		6	5
17	Slovenia	15	7	12	17	9	13		10	1
18	Latvia	16	10	17	16	14	17		14	

Detailed voting results from the Czech Republic (Final)
R/O	Country	Jury							Televote	
R/O	Country	J. Sidovský	E. Stoilow	E. Mraz	K. Říhová	K. Hodr	Rank	Points	Rank	Points
01	Israel	11	13	26	13	8	14		13	
02	Poland	12	12	6	12	9	10	1	12	
03	Belarus	20	8	11	8	20	12		8	3
04	Austria	8	6	13	6	10	7	4	24	
05	Armenia	18	22	12	22	26	21		9	2
06	Netherlands	2	3	1	3	6	3	8	19	
07	Moldova	6	7	5	7	21	8	3	6	5
08	Hungary	24	24	17	24	22	25		11	
09	Italy	17	17	18	17	5	15		10	1
10	Denmark	5	5	4	5	23	5	6	25	
11	Portugal	1	1	3	1	1	1	12	3	8
12	Azerbaijan	15	14	8	14	18	13		2	10
13	Croatia	26	23	10	23	24	24		17	
14	Australia	3	2	2	2	3	2	10	21	
15	Greece	16	21	24	21	19	22		23	
16	Spain	23	25	19	25	11	23		26	
17	Norway	22	15	25	15	12	17		20	
18	United Kingdom	14	10	7	10	2	6	5	18	
19	Cyprus	10	20	23	20	17	18		16	
20	Romania	21	26	21	26	25	26		5	6
21	Germany	13	16	16	16	15	16		22	
22	Ukraine	25	18	22	18	14	20		4	7
23	Belgium	9	11	15	11	13	11		7	4
24	Sweden	4	4	9	4	4	4	7	14	
25	Bulgaria	7	9	14	9	7	9	2	1	12
26	France	19	19	20	19	16	19		15	
