= United Kingdom in the Eurovision Song Contest 2017 =

- Eurovision Song Contest 2017
- Participating broadcaster: British Broadcasting Corporation (BBC)
- Country: United Kingdom
- Selection process: Eurovision: You Decide
- Selection date: 27 January 2017

Competing entry
- Song: "Never Give Up on You"
- Artist: Lucie Jones
- Songwriters: Daniel Salcedo; Emmelie de Forest; Lawrie Martin

Placement
- Final result: 15th, 111 points

Participation chronology

The United Kingdom was represented at the Eurovision Song Contest 2017 with the song "Never Give Up on You", written by Daniel Salcedo, Emmelie de Forest, and Lawrie Martin, and performed by Lucie Jones. The British participating broadcaster, the British Broadcasting Corporation (BBC), selected its entry in the contest via the national final Eurovision: You Decide. Six acts competed in the national final and the winner was selected through the combination of a public vote and the votes of an eight-member professional jury. Songwriter de Forest represented Denmark in 2013 with the song "Only Teardrops" winning the competition.

As a member of the "Big Five", the United Kingdom automatically qualified to compete in the final of the Eurovision Song Contest. Performing in position 18, the United Kingdom placed 15th out of the 26 participating countries with 111 points.

== Background ==
Prior to the 2017 contest, the British Broadcasting Corporation (BBC) had participated in the Eurovision Song Contest representing the United Kingdom fifty-nine times. Thus far, it has won the contest five times: in 1967 with the song "Puppet on a String" performed by Sandie Shaw, in 1969 with the song "Boom Bang-a-Bang" performed by Lulu, in 1976 with the song "Save Your Kisses for Me" performed by Brotherhood of Man, in 1981 with the song "Making Your Mind Up" performed by Bucks Fizz, and in 1997 with the song "Love Shine a Light" performed by Katrina and the Waves. To this point, the nation is noted for having finished as the runner-up in a record fifteen contests. Up to and including 1998, the UK had only twice finished outside the top 10, in 1978 and 1987. Since 1999, the year in which the rule was abandoned that songs must be performed in one of the official languages of the country participating, the UK has had less success, thus far only finishing within the top ten twice: in 2002 with the song "Come Back" performed by Jessica Garlick and in 2009 with the song "It's My Time" performed by Jade Ewen. For the 2016 contest, the United Kingdom finished in twenty-fourth place out of twenty-six competing entries with the song "You're Not Alone" performed by Joe and Jake.

As part of its duties as participating broadcaster, the BBC organises the selection of its entry in the Eurovision Song Contest and broadcasts the event in the country. The broadcaster announced that it would participate in the 2017 contest on 6 October 2016. Between 2011 and 2015, BBC opted to internally select the British entry, while the broadcaster organised a national final featuring a competition among several artists and songs in 2016. For their 2017 entry, BBC announced that a national final involving a public vote would be held to select United Kingdom's entry.

== Before Eurovision ==
=== Eurovision: You Decide ===
Eurovision: You Decide was the national final developed by the BBC in order to select the British entry for the Eurovision Song Contest 2017. Six acts competed in a televised show on 27 January 2017 held at the Eventim Apollo venue in Hammersmith, London and hosted by Mel Giedroyc. The winner was selected through the combination of the votes of a professional jury and a public vote. The show was broadcast on BBC Two as well as streamed online via the BBC iPlayer. The national final was watched by 1.26 million viewers in the United Kingdom with a market share of 6.6%.

==== Competing entries ====
On 6 October 2016, BBC announced an open submission for interested artists to submit their songs in the form of a video recording. The submission period lasted until 1 November 2016. The received submissions from the open call were reviewed and a shortlist was compiled by the UK branch of the international OGAE fan club. Additional entries were provided to the BBC by the British Academy of Songwriters, Composers and Authors (BASCA) which ran a songwriting competition amongst its members. The BBC also held multiple songwriting camps and collaborated with the former music director of RCA Records and founder of Innocent Records, Hugh Goldsmith, to consult with music industry experts including writers, producers, artist managers and members of the British Phonographic Industry (BPI) in order to encourage entry submissions and involvement in the national final. Songs from all entry methods were included in a final shortlist which was presented to a professional panel that ultimately selected six finalists to compete in the national final. The six competing songs were premiered during The Ken Bruce Show on BBC Radio 2 on 23 January 2017.

==== Final ====
Six acts competed in the televised final on 27 January 2017. In addition to their performances, guest performers included previous Eurovision Song Contest winner Alexander Rybak, who won the contest for Norway in 2009 with the song "Fairytale", and The Vamps performing their song "All Night".

A combination of the votes from an eight-member professional jury and a public vote consisting of televoting and online voting selected the winner. A combination of the votes from an eight-member professional jury and a public vote consisting of televoting and online voting selected the winner. The jury and public vote each created a ranking from which points from 1 (lowest) to 6 (highest) were awarded, and after both sets of points were combined, "Never Give Up on You" performed by Lucie Jones was the winner. Three of the jury members also provided feedback regarding the songs during the show. The members were Bruno Tonioli (choreographer, dancer and television personality), Sophie Ellis-Bextor (singer-songwriter) and CeCe Sammy (vocal and performance coach).

R/O	Artist	Song	Songwriter(s)	Place
1	Holly Brewer	"I Wish I Loved You More"	Kevin Fisher; Courtney Harrell; Laurell Barker; Mattias Frändå; Johan Åsgärde; Oliver Lundström	—N/a
2	Danyl Johnson	"Light Up the World"	Dan McAllister; Rick Blaskey; Greg Walker; Chris Sutherland; Ameerah Roelants	—N/a
3	Lucie Jones	"Never Give Up on You"	Daniel Salcedo; Emmelie de Forest; Lawrie Martin	1
4	Olivia Garcia	"Freedom Hearts"	Gabriel Alares; Sebastian Lestapier; Linnea Nelson; Laurell Barker	—N/a
5	Nate Simpson	"What Are We Made Of"	Jon Hällgren; Eric Lumiere; DWB	—N/a
6	Salena Mastroianni	"I Don't Wanna Fight"	The Treatment; Nicole Blair; Marli Harwood	—N/a

=== Preparation ===
Following the national final, Lucie Jones revealed during an interview on BBC Breakfast that she and the BBC would be seeking to make changes to "Never Give Up on You", stating they had listened to feedback from viewers on social media and would look at ideas at how to make it better. The new version of the song was recorded at Tileyard Studios in late February 2017 and presented to the public on 11 March 2017 through the release of the official music video via the official Eurovision Song Contest's YouTube channel.

=== Promotion ===
Lucie Jones specifically promoted "Never Give Up on You" as the British Eurovision entry on 8 April by performing during the Eurovision in Concert event which was held at the Melkweg venue in Amsterdam, Netherlands and hosted by Cornald Maas and Selma Björnsdóttir. In addition to her international appearances, on 2 April, Jones performed during the London Eurovision Party, which was held at the Café de Paris venue in London and hosted by Nicki French and Paddy O'Connell. On 28 April, Jones was part of the guest line-up for the BBC One programme The Graham Norton Show where she performed "Never Give Up on You" live and was interviewed by host Graham Norton.

== At Eurovision ==
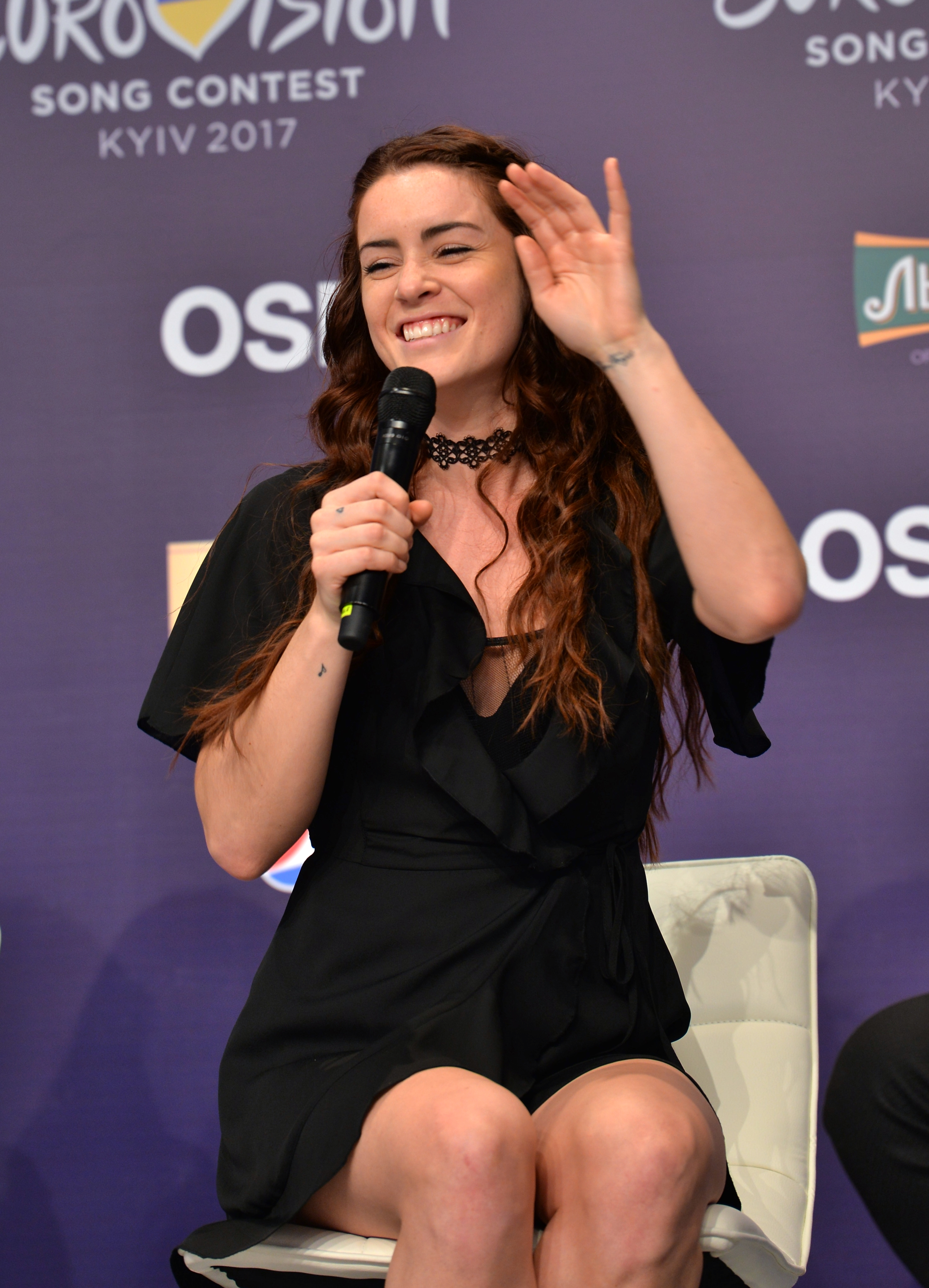
Lucie Jones during a press meet and greet

According to Eurovision rules, all nations with the exceptions of the host country and the "Big Five" (France, Germany, Italy, Spain and the United Kingdom) are required to compete in one of two semi-finals, and qualify in order to participate in the final; the top ten countries from each semi-final progress to the final. As a member of the "Big Five", the United Kingdom automatically qualified to compete in the final on 13 May 2017. In addition to their participation in the final, the United Kingdom is also required to broadcast and vote in one of the two semi-finals. During the semi-final allocation draw on 31 January 2017, the United Kingdom was assigned to broadcast and vote in the first semi-final on 9 May 2017.

In the United Kingdom, the semi-finals were broadcast on BBC Four with commentary by Scott Mills and Mel Giedroyc, while the final was televised on BBC One with commentary by Graham Norton and broadcast on BBC Radio 2 with commentary by Ken Bruce. The British spokesperson, who announced the top 12-point score awarded by the British jury during the final, was Katrina Leskanich who won the contest for the United Kingdom in 1997 as part of the band Katrina and the Waves.

=== Final ===
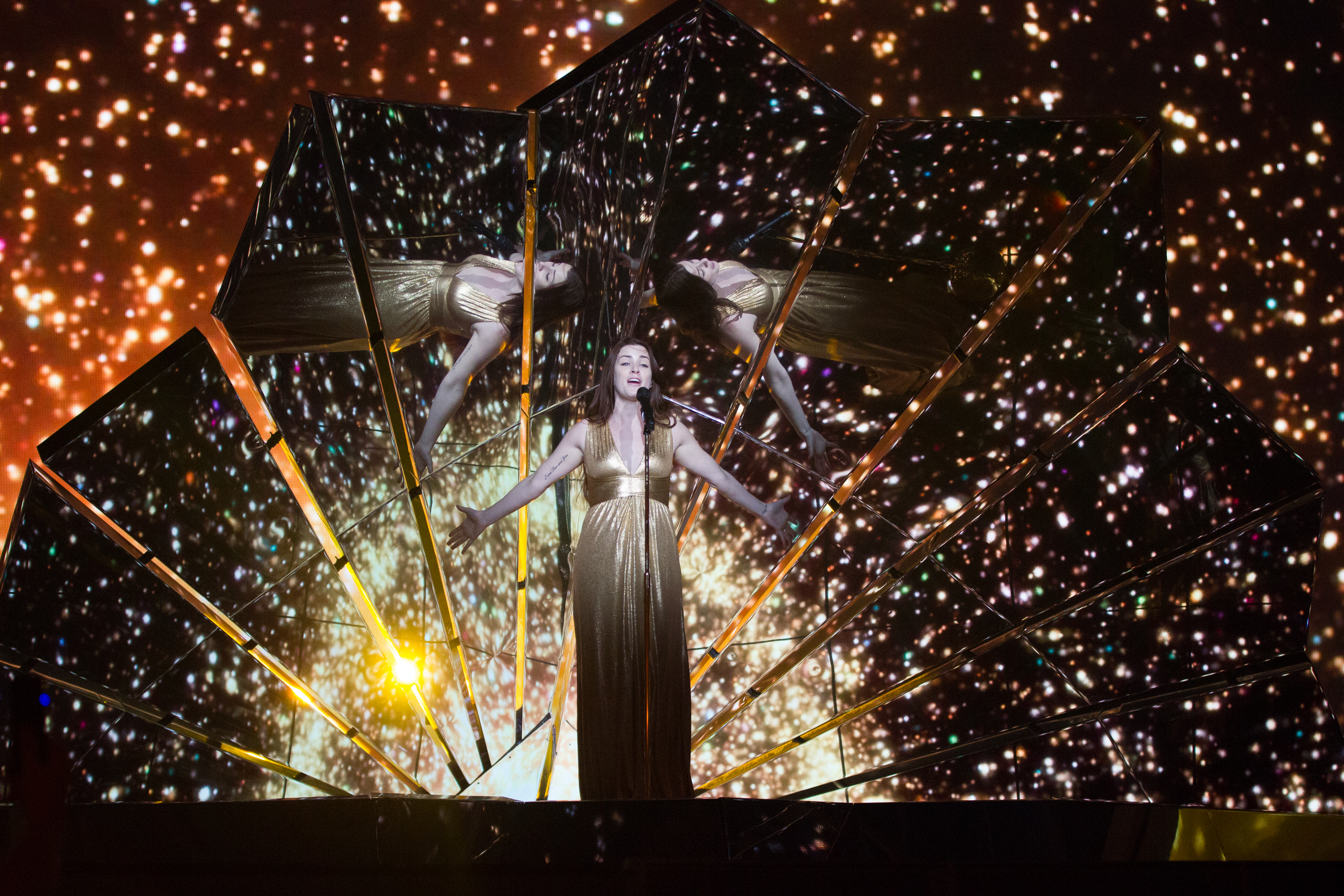
Lucie Jones during a rehearsal before the final

Lucie Jones took part in technical rehearsals on 5 and 7 May, followed by dress rehearsals on 8, 12 and 13 May. This included the semi-final jury show on 8 May where an extended clip of the British performance was filmed for broadcast during the live show on 9 May and the jury final on 12 May where the professional juries of each country watched and voted on the competing entries. After technical rehearsals were held on 7 May, the "Big Five" countries and host country Ukraine held a press conference. As part of this press conference, the artists took part in a draw to determine which half of the grand final they would subsequently participate in. The United Kingdom was drawn to compete in the second half. Following the conclusion of the second semi-final, the shows' producers decided upon the running order of the final. The running order for the semi-finals and final was decided by the shows' producers rather than through another draw, so that similar songs were not placed next to each other. The United Kingdom was subsequently placed to perform in position 18, following the entry from Norway and before the entry from Cyprus.

The British performance featured Lucie Jones performing on a predominately yellow and gold coloured stage which featured a perspex shell prop that showed reflection of Jones, with the LED screens transitioning from golden circular shapes that exploded along with the shell and stage arch to a volcanic fire. The performance also featured pyrotechnic effects. The United Kingdom placed fifteenth in the final, scoring 111 points: 12 points from the televoting and 99 points from the juries.

=== Voting ===
Voting during the three shows involved each country awarding two sets of points from 1-8, 10 and 12: one from their professional jury and the other from televoting. Each nation's jury consisted of five music industry professionals who are citizens of the country they represent, with their names published before the contest to ensure transparency. This jury judged each entry based on: vocal capacity; the stage performance; the song's composition and originality; and the overall impression by the act. In addition, no member of a national jury was permitted to be related in any way to any of the competing acts in such a way that they cannot vote impartially and independently. The individual rankings of each jury member as well as the nation's televoting results were released shortly after the grand final.

Below is a breakdown of points awarded to the United Kingdom and awarded by United Kingdom in the first semi-final and grand final of the contest, and the breakdown of the jury voting and televoting conducted during the two shows:

==== Points awarded to the United Kingdom ====
Points awarded to the United Kingdom (Final)
Score	Televote	Jury
12 points		Australia
10 points		Slovenia
8 points		Albania
7 points		Iceland
6 points		Estonia; Germany; San Marino
5 points		Cyprus; Czech Republic; Netherlands; Poland
4 points	Ireland; Malta	Armenia; Latvia
3 points	Australia	France; Hungary; Macedonia
2 points		Belgium; Finland
1 point	Spain	Austria; Greece; Norway

==== Points awarded by the United Kingdom ====
Points awarded by the United Kingdom (Semi-final 1)
Score	Televote	Jury
12 points	Poland	Moldova
10 points	Portugal	Portugal
8 points	Moldova	Czech Republic
7 points	Latvia	Australia
6 points	Cyprus	Poland
5 points	Greece	Armenia
4 points	Belgium	Belgium
3 points	Finland	Cyprus
2 points	Iceland	Sweden
1 point	Sweden	Georgia

Points awarded by the United Kingdom (Final)
Score	Televote	Jury
12 points	Bulgaria	Portugal
10 points	Poland	Australia
8 points	Portugal	Sweden
7 points	Romania	Bulgaria
6 points	Moldova	Moldova
5 points	Croatia	Belgium
4 points	Sweden	Netherlands
3 points	Belgium	Austria
2 points	Italy	Denmark
1 point	Hungary	Belarus

==== Detailed voting results ====
The following members comprised the British jury:

- Mary Hammond (jury chairperson) – singing teacher, singer
- Emma Stevens – singer, songwriter
- Rokhsan Heydari – songwriter
- Mark Eldridge (Kipper) – producer, musician
- Jay London – radio DJ

Detailed voting results from the United Kingdom (Semi-final 1)
R/O	Country	Jury							Televote	
R/O	Country	E. Stevens	R. Heydari	Kipper	J. London	M. Hammond	Rank	Points	Rank	Points
01	Sweden	16	3	8	4	13	9	2	10	1
02	Georgia	12	6	12	8	9	10	1	18	
03	Australia	6	8	10	2	10	4	7	12	
04	Albania	18	9	17	15	16	18		16	
05	Belgium	5	12	7	1	18	7	4	7	4
06	Montenegro	14	17	18	18	6	17		11	
07	Finland	7	16	6	17	11	14		8	3
08	Azerbaijan	17	4	15	9	14	15		15	
09	Portugal	1	1	2	6	15	2	10	2	10
10	Greece	13	14	13	14	8	16		6	5
11	Poland	9	11	3	13	5	5	6	1	12
12	Moldova	8	5	4	3	1	1	12	3	8
13	Iceland	3	10	9	10	17	11		9	2
14	Czech Republic	2	2	14	11	3	3	8	17	
15	Cyprus	11	13	5	7	7	8	3	5	6
16	Armenia	10	7	1	12	12	6	5	13	
17	Slovenia	4	15	16	16	2	13		14	
18	Latvia	15	18	11	5	4	12		4	7

Detailed voting results from the United Kingdom (Final)
R/O	Country	Jury							Televote	
R/O	Country	E. Stevens	R. Heydari	Kipper	J. London	M. Hammond	Rank	Points	Rank	Points
01	Israel	11	24	16	20	11	17		19	
02	Poland	14	10	11	16	22	13		2	10
03	Belarus	3	11	14	19	8	10	1	17	
04	Austria	5	19	10	8	9	8	3	18	
05	Armenia	18	15	9	25	16	18		21	
06	Netherlands	6	5	2	9	19	7	4	12	
07	Moldova	7	7	7	2	4	5	6	5	6
08	Hungary	17	18	21	24	23	24		10	1
09	Italy	16	14	23	17	18	20		9	2
10	Denmark	12	4	4	11	20	9	2	24	
11	Portugal	1	3	5	7	1	1	12	3	8
12	Azerbaijan	19	12	17	18	13	15		20	
13	Croatia	20	25	24	23	6	23		6	5
14	Australia	2	8	3	4	7	2	10	16	
15	Greece	15	16	22	21	24	22		11	
16	Spain	25	21	25	10	2	19		25	
17	Norway	24	9	20	12	14	14		14	
18	United Kingdom									
19	Cyprus	13	17	15	15	5	12		13	
20	Romania	22	13	13	14	17	16		4	7
21	Germany	8	23	8	5	12	11		23	
22	Ukraine	21	20	18	13	21	21		22	
23	Belgium	4	6	12	1	15	6	5	8	3
24	Sweden	9	1	6	6	3	3	8	7	4
25	Bulgaria	10	2	1	3	10	4	7	1	12
26	France	23	22	19	22	25	25		15	
