= Javicoro =

Venezuelan YouTuber, and blogger

- Born: August 2, 1988 (age 38); Maracay, Venezuela
- Other name: javicoro
- Education: Universidad Centroccidental Lisandro Alvarado
- Occupations: YouTuber; Blogger; Reporter; Podcaster; Activist
- Organization(s): IOM, Alianza por Venezuela
- Partner: Gloria Vargas (m. 2012; div. 2022)

YouTube information
- Channel: Javicoro
- Years active: 2015–present
- Genres: Travel blog; Podcast
- Subscribers: 309 thousand
- Views: 51.7 million
- Last updated: 4 August 2026

Javier Enrique Cárdenas Escalona (Maracay, Venezuela, August 2, 1988), better known as Javicoro, is a Venezuelan YouTuber, blogger, reporter, podcaster and activist for the rights of immigrants, goodwill Ambassador for International Organization for Migration (IOM). and member of the Non-profit Civil Association. "Alliance for Venezuela"

He is dedicated to creating content for social media aimed at migrants and refugees.

Since 2014. he lives in Buenos Aires, Argentina. (Since he has Argentine citizenship as well)

He is host of Raices en Movimiento, a podcast in collaboration with the IOM recorded in Radio Capital.

Frequently gives conferences in different universities such as University of Palermo, National University of Lomas de Zamora and National University of La Matanza.

== Biography ==
Born in Venezuela in 1988, he started his career on social media at the age of 26 and quickly gained popularity in his home country thanks to his humor and charisma.

In 2016, due to the difficult political and economic situation in Venezuela, he decided to move to Argentina in search of new opportunities. In this country, he continued his work on social media, documenting his life on his YouTube channel and his profiles on Instagram and YouTube.

He has also stood out for his work in helping immigrants and refugees, organizing clothing and food donation campaigns, and collaborating with non-governmental organizations that work in support of this population.

Thanks to his social commitment and popularity on social media, he has been recognized on several occasions for his work, receiving awards and accolades for his humanitarian aid work and promotion of immigrant integration in Argentina.

As of April 2026, he continues to work on his career as a YouTuber and influencer, but always maintaining his commitment to the community and his work in helping those in need.

In 2017 and 2022 he was appointed ambassador of the IOM (International Organization for Migration) for a UN campaign against racism and xenophobia.

He has over 1 million followers on TikTok and more than 300,000 on YouTube.

He participated in an event organized in collaboration with the Argentine National Directorate of Migration, where the National Director, Sebastián Seoane, and his team were present. The event also included more than 20 Venezuelan civil society organizations in Argentina, the Chamber of Venezuelan Entrepreneurs and Businesspeople in Argentina, and key figures from the Venezuelan community across the country.

Recently, Javicoro gained significant attention in Chile after a video in which he explores the Santiago Metro went viral, making him a trending topic in the country.
