= Depi Evratesil =

Armenian television show

- Genre: Music; entertainment; reality television
- Judges: Essaï Altounian (2016–17); Anush Arshakyan (2016–17); Inga Arshakyan (2016–17); Hayko (2016–17); Aram Mp3 (2016–17); Iveta Mukuchyan (2016–17)
- Country of origin: Armenia
- Original language: Armenian
- No. of seasons: 4
- No. of episodes: 13 (total)

Original release
- Network: Public Television of Armenia (AMPTV)
- Release: 22 October 2016 – present

Related
- Depi Mankakan Evratesil

Depi Evratesil (Armenian: Դեպի Եվրատեսիլ, pronounced [dɛˈpi jɛvɾɑtɛˈsil], lit. 'Towards Eurovision') is an Armenian music entertainment show created by Public Television of Armenia (AMPTV). It was used as the Armenian national selection for the Eurovision Song Contest in 2017, 2018, 2020, and 2025.

Its first season concluded on 24 December 2016 with the selection of Artsvik as Armenia's Eurovision representative. The second season took place in 2018, and selected Sevak Khanagyan with the song "Qami". In 2019, the show was not renewed for a third season, and the Armenian entry for the contest was selected internally. The show returned for a third season in 2020 and a fourth season in 2025.

== Summary ==
=== Season 1 (2016–17) ===
Season 1 of Depi Evratesil was announced on 1 July 2016. It was later confirmed that former Armenian Eurovision entrants Essaï Altounian, Inga and Anush Arshakyan, Hayko, Aram Mp3, and Iveta Mukuchyan would serve as judges on the show, each creating their own team of contestants and mentoring them through the show in a similar way to The Voice. Contestants took part in auditions from 22 October to 12 November 2016, where those successful were selected by the judges to be part of one of their teams. Afterwards, the contestants battled each other from 19 November to 3 December to make the semifinals. The semifinals were held on 10 and 17 December. Artsvik was declared the winner of Depi Evratesil on the final held on 24 December.

Judge	Artist	Draw	Song 1	Draw	Song 2	Percentage	Place
Anush	Marta	1	"Don't Stop the Music"/"Only Girl (In the World)"	3	"Tsov"	29%	2
Essaï	Artsvik	2	"I Have Nothing"	4	"Aprelu april"	71%	1

=== Season 2 (2018) ===
Season 2 of Depi Evratesil was confirmed in October 2017. Unlike the previous season, artists entered with their own original songs, instead of performing covers throughout the course of the show. It aired in February 2018. The twenty selected finalists were revealed on 27 December 2017.

Draw	Artist	Song	Points	Place
1	Sevak Khanagyan	"Qami"	24	1
2	Gevorg Harutyunyan	"Stand Up"	8	7
3	Lusine Mardanyan	"If You Don't Walk Me Home"	8	8
4	Kamil Show	"Puerto Rico"	12	4
5	Amalia Margaryan	"Waiting for the Sun"	15	3
6	Nemra	"I'm a Liar"	18	2
7	Mariam Petrosyan	"Fade"	9	5
8	Mger Armenia	"Forever"	7	9
9	Robert Koloyan	"Get Away With Us"	6	10
10	Asmik Shiroyan	"You and I"	9	6

=== Season 3 (2020) ===
In November 2019, it was confirmed that Depi Evratesil would return for a third season in 2020, after not being held in 2019. As in 2018, the contest selected both the Armenian song and artist for the Eurovision Song Contest 2020. The contest consisted of a single show on 15 February 2020.

Draw	Artist	Song	Points	Place
1	Agop	"Butterflies"	75	10
2	Karina Evn	"Why?"	84	8
3	Hayk Music	"What Is To Be In Love"	57	12
4	Erna	"Life Faces"	120	2
5	Eva Rida	"No Love"	84	8
6	Athena Manoukian	"Chains on You"	168	1
7	Gabriel Jeeg	"It's Your Turn"	99	5
8	Sergey & Nikolay Harutyunov	"Ha, Take a Step"	96	6
9	Miriam Baghdasaryan	"Run Away"	108	4
10	Vladimir Arzumanyan	"What's Going On Mama"	118	3
11	Arthur Aleq	"Heaven"	65	11
12	Tokionine	"Save Me"	96	6

=== Season 4 (2025) ===
AMPTV confirmed its intention to participate in the 2025 contest on 30 November 2024, announcing that its entry would again be selected through Depi Evratesil. The competition took place on 16 February 2025 at the Karen Demirchyan Sports and Concerts Complex in Yerevan.

Draw	Artist	Song	Points	Place
1	Parg	"Survivor"	214	1
2	Sevagir	"Falling"	35	12
3	Anahit Adamyan	"Tiny Little Boo"	96	5
4	Mels	"Losing"	91	6
5	Simon	"Ay paparey bye"	197	2
6	Flora Bichakhchyan	"Prayer"	75	8
7	Gevorg Harutyunyan	"Hey Man"	78	7
8	Altsight	"Dare to Dream"	41	11
9	Anahit Hakobyan and Gasoiia	"Wild"	115	4
10	Arsen feat. Kamil	"Will You Marry Me?"	42	9
11	Milena Mirijanyan	"Romantic Net"	42	10
12	Athena Manoukian	"Daqueenation"	192	3

== Depi Mankakan Evratesil ==
Depi Evratesil
- Also known as: Depi Mankakan Evratesil
- Genre: Music; entertainment; reality television
- Country of origin: Armenia
- Original language: Armenian
- No. of seasons: 2
- No. of episodes: 4

Original release
- Network: Public Television of Armenia (AMPTV)
- Release: 9 September 2018 – present

On 26 February 2018, ARMTV announced a spin-off called Depi Mankakan Evratesil (Armenian: Դեպի Մանկական Եվրատեսիլ; "Towards Junior Eurovision"). This spin-off was used to select the Armenian entry for the Junior Eurovision Song Contest 2018 in Minsk, Belarus. The show was won by L.E.V.O.N with the song of the same name, which placed 9th in the contest with 125 points, serving as Armenia's worst result to date. The show was once again used to select the Armenian artist and song for the 2019 contest, and was won by the song "Colours of Your Dream", performed by Karina Ignatyan, which represented Armenia in the Junior Eurovision Song Contest 2019, coming 9th again with 115 points.

=== Season 1 (2018) ===
The first season consisted of two semi-finals held on 9 and 16 September 2018, and a final held on 22 September 2018. Twenty-three artists and songs competed, with ten competing in the final.

Draw	Artist	Song	Place	Points
1	Lia	"Kamac-kamac"	9	9
2	Anahit Arakelyan	"Shabadibam"	8	11
3	Harut Harutyunyan	"Amar e"	10	6
4	Lily	"Payqar"	5	15
5	Vova	"Leggo"	3	23
6	Serzh Arakelyan	"Good Mood"	6	13
7	Vardan Margaryan	"Janaparh"	2	26
8	Eliza	"Im erazanq"	7	12
9	L.E.V.O.N	"L.E.V.O.N"	1	28
10	Ani	"Angels"	4	18

=== Season 2 (2019) ===
The second season contained only one episode, aired on 15 September. The ten finalists were revealed on 3 September along with their competing entries.

Draw	Artist	Song	Place	Points
1	Karina Ignatyan	"Colours of Your Dream"	1	138
2	Narek Markosyan	"Im ergy"	10	42
3	Anzhela Albertyan	"Khaghanq khaghagh"	5	75
4	Roza Eloyan	"Im qaghaq"	3	97
5	Robert Bagratyan	"Captain Friendship"	4	81
6	Emily Hovhannisyan	"Parum enq pary"	9	43
7	Anishock	"Selfie Yerevan"	8	64
8	Ani Atayan	"Every Time"	7	75
9	Vardan Margaryan	"La La La"	2	135
10	Anahit Arakelyan	"Chem handznvi"	6	75

== Winners ==
=== Depi Evratesil ===
Season		Song	Artist	At Eurovision			
Season		Song	Artist	Final	Points	Semi	Points
1	2017	"Fly With Me"	Artsvik	18	79	7	152
2	2018	"Qami"	Sevak Khanagyan	Failed to qualify		15	79
3	2020	"Chains on You"	Athena Manoukian	Contest cancelled			
3	2025	"Survivor"	Parg	20	72	10	51

=== Depi Mankakan Evratesil ===
Season		Song	Artist	At Junior Eurovision	
Season		Song	Artist	Final	Points
1	2018	"L.E.V.O.N"	L.E.V.O.N	9	125
2	2019	"Colours of Your Dream"	Karina Ignatyan	9	115

== See also ==
- Armenia in the Eurovision Song Contest
- Television in Armenia
