= Armenia in the Eurovision Song Contest 2018 =

- Eurovision Song Contest 2018
- Participating broadcaster: Public Television of Armenia (AMPTV)
- Country: Armenia
- Selection process: Depi Evratesil 2018
- Selection date: 25 February 2018

Competing entry
- Song: "Qami"
- Artist: Sevak Khanagyan
- Songwriters: Sevak Khanagyan; Anna Danielyan; Viktorya Maloyan

Placement
- Semi-final result: Failed to qualify (15th)

Participation chronology

Armenia was represented at the Eurovision Song Contest 2018 with the song "Qami" written by Sevak Khanagyan, Anna Danielyan and Viktorya Maloyan. The song was performed by Sevak Khanagyan. The Armenian entry for the 2018 contest in Lisbon, Portugal was selected through the national final Depi Evratesil 2018, organised by the Armenian broadcaster Public Television of Armenia (AMPTV). The national final and consisted of three shows: two semi-finals and a final. Ten entries competed in each semi-final with the top five from each semi-final qualifying to compete in the final on 25 February 2018. "Qami" performed by Sevak Khanagyan was selected as the winner following the combination of votes from an international jury and a public televote.

Armenia was drawn to compete in the first semi-final of the Eurovision Song Contest which took place on 8 May 2018. Performing during the show in position 16, "Qami" was not announced among the top 10 entries of the first semi-final and therefore did not qualify to compete in the final. It was later revealed that Armenia placed fifteenth out of the 19 participating countries in the semi-final with 79 points.

== Background ==
Prior to the 2018 contest, Armenia had participated in the Eurovision Song Contest eleven times since its first entry in 2006. Its highest placing in the contest, to this point, has been fourth place, which the nation achieved on two occasions: in 2008 with the song "Qélé, Qélé" performed by Sirusho and in 2014 with the song "Not Alone" performed by Aram Mp3. Armenia had, to this point, failed to qualify to the final on only one occasion in 2011. The nation briefly withdrew from the contest in 2012 due to long-standing tensions with then host country Azerbaijan. In 2017, "Fly with Me" performed by Artsvik placed eighteenth in the final.

The Armenian national broadcaster, Public Television of Armenia (AMPTV), broadcasts the event within Armenia and organises the selection process for the nation's entry. AMPTV confirmed their intentions to participate at the 2018 Eurovision Song Contest on 27 October 2017. Armenia has used various methods to select the Armenian entry in the past, such as a live televised national final to choose the performer, song or both to compete at Eurovision. However internal selections have also been held on occasion. Between 2014 and 2016, the broadcaster internally selected both the artist and the song. The broadcaster opted to organize a national final titled Depi Evratesil to select the Armenian performer for the 2017 contest, with the song being internally selected. However, AMPTV announced along with their participation confirmation that Depi Evratesil would once again be organized but would select both the artist and the song for the 2018 contest.

== Before Eurovision ==
=== Depi Evratesil 2018 ===
Depi Evratesil 2018 (Towards Eurovision 2018) was the second edition of the national final Depi Evratesil and selected the Armenian entry for the Eurovision Song Contest 2018. The competition commenced on 19 February 2018 with the first of two semi-finals and concluded with a winning song and artist during the final on 25 February 2018. All shows in the competition took place at the AMPTV studios in Yerevan, hosted by Gohar Gasparyan and broadcast on Armenia 1 as well as online via the broadcaster's website 1tv.am.

==== Format ====
The national final took place over three stages and consisted of three shows. The first stage was a submission period where artists and songwriters had the opportunity to apply by submitting their entries online. Twenty entries were selected to proceed to the second stage of the competition. The second stage consisted of the semi-finals which took place on 19 and 22 December 2018 with ten entries competing in each show. The top five from each semi-final proceeded to the third stage, the final which took place on 25 February 2018. In the final, the winner was selected from the remaining ten entries. The results of each of the three shows were determined by the 50/50 combination of votes from an international jury panel and a public vote. The public were able to cast their votes via SMS, and both the public and jury vote developed an overall ranking which were converted to points from 1-8, 10 and 12 and assigned to the competing entries.

==== Competing entries ====
On 27 October 2017, AMPTV announced an online submission period with a deadline of 15 December 2017. Artists were required to be aged at least 16 and are of Armenian citizenship or heritage, and were also required to submit a cover version of another song along with their entry submission. Songwriters worldwide were able to submit songs. The broadcaster received more than 100 entries at the closing of the deadline. A jury panel selected twenty entries to proceed to the national final, which were announced on 27 December 2017. Among the competing artists was Tamar Kaprelian who represented Armenia in the Eurovision Song Contest 2015 as part of the group Genealogy.

Artist	Song	Songwriter(s)
AlternatiV	"Stare at Me"	Sargis Burnazyan
Amalia Margaryan	"Waiting for the Sun"	Vahram Yanikyan, Amalia Margaryan
Angel	"Heartbeat"	Anzhela Barseghyan, Vahram Yanikyan
Arman Mesropyan	"What You Hide"	Vahram Yanikyan
Asmik Shiroyan	"You & I"	HAJ, Neil Ormandy, Marli Harwood
Gata Band	"Shogha" (Շողա)	Andranik Manukyan
Gevorg Harutyunyan	"Stand Up"	Astghik Grigoryan, Gevorg Harutyunyan, Liana Aramyan
Hayk Kasparov	"Enamórame"	Rafael Artesero Herrero, José Juan Santana Rodriguez
Kamil Show	"Puerto Rico"	Vahram Petrosyan, Arthur Abgar
Lusine Mardanyan	"If You Don't Walk Me Home"	Lusine Mardanyan, Gagach Derkhorenyan
Maria's Secret	"Escape"	Jorj Tonoyan
Mariam	"Fade"	Mariam Petrosyan
Mger Armenia	"Forever"	Arsen Barsamyan, Arshavir Stepanyan
Nemra	"I'm a Liar"	Van Yeghiazaryan
Robert Koloyan	"Get Away With Us"	Robert Koloyan, Arthur Armeni Mnatsakanyan, Grigor Kyokchyan
Sevak Khanagyan	"Qami" (Քամի)	Sevak Khanagyan, Anna Danielyan, Viktorya Maloyan
Suren Poghosyan	"The Voice"	Georgios Kalpakidis, Natasha Turner, Jonas Gladnikoff
Tamar Kaprelian	"Poison (Ari Ari)" (Արի Արի)	Tamar Kaprelian, Sebu Simonian, Harutyun Der-Hovagimian, Ovsanna Khublaryan, Yana Karapetyan, Sanahin Papazian
Tyom	"Follow the Ocean"	Gevorg Gevorgyan, Inna Mkrtchyan
Zhanna Davtyan	"Unbreakable"	Nikolayn Egibyan, Zhanna Davtyan

==== Semi-finals ====
Two semi-finals took place on 19 and 22 February 2018. In each semi-final ten entries competed and the top five qualified to the final by the 50/50 combination of votes from a six-member international jury and a public vote. In addition to the performances of the competing entries, the interval acts featured Armenian 2017 Junior Eurovision entrant Misha with "Boomerang" in semi-final 1, and Syuzanna Melqonyan with "Euphoria", "Rise Like a Phoenix" and "1944" in semi-final 2.

Semi-final 1 – 19 February 2018
R/O	Artist	Song	Jury		Televote		Total	Place
R/O	Artist	Song	Votes	Points	Votes	Points	Total	Place
1	Gevorg Harutyunyan	"Stand Up"	31	6	2,261	12	18	2
2	Angel	"Heartbeat"	22	1	54	1	2	10
3	Lusine Mardanyan	"If You Don't Walk Me Home"	44	10	313	3	13	4
4	Zhanna Davtyan	"Unbreakable"	31	7	259	2	9	8
5	Mger Armenia	"Forever"	28	4	1,898	8	12	5
6	Nemra	"I'm a Liar"	66	12	2,125	10	22	1
7	Hayk Kasparov	"Enamórame"	27	3	361	4	7	9
8	Tamar Kaprelian	"Poison (Ari Ari)"	31	5	543	5	10	6
9	Robert Koloyan	"Get Away With Us"	42	8	789	6	14	3
10	Gata Band	"Shogha"	26	2	1,512	7	9	7

Detailed Jury Votes
R/O	Song	Juror 1	Juror 2	Juror 3	Juror 4	Juror 5	Juror 6	Total
1	"Stand Up"	2	8	8	7	2	4	31
2	"Heartbeat"	5	4	5	4	3	1	22
3	"If You Don't Walk Me Home"	12	1	4	10	7	10	44
4	"Unbreakable"	3	2	10	3	6	7	31
5	"Forever"	1	5	3	1	10	8	28
6	"I'm a Liar"	10	12	12	12	8	12	66
7	"Enamórame"	7	6	2	2	4	6	27
8	"Poison (Ari Ari)"	4	7	7	6	5	2	31
9	"Get Away with Us"	8	3	6	8	12	5	42
10	"Shogha"	6	10	1	5	1	3	26
International Jury Members
Sweden: Sacha Jean-Baptiste (Artistic director); Estonia: Mart Normet (Producer); Latvia: Zita Kaminska (TV director); Israel: Tali Eshkoli (TV producer, Eurovision expert); Cyprus: Evi Papamichael (ESC Head of Delegation); Poland: Mateusz Grzesinski (ESC Head of Delegation)

Semi-final 2 – 22 February 2018
R/O	Artist	Song	Jury		Televote		Total	Place
R/O	Artist	Song	Votes	Points	Votes	Points	Total	Place
1	Maria's Secret	"Escape"	30	5	237	3	8	7
2	Arman Mesropyan	"What You Hide"	19	2	301	4	6	9
3	Kamil Show	"Puerto Rico"	15	1	1,917	10	11	5
4	Suren Poghosyan	"The Voice"	27	4	202	2	6	10
5	Amalia Margaryan	"Waiting for the Sun"	56	10	1,913	8	18	2
6	AlternatiV	"Stare at Me"	42	7	172	1	8	8
7	Tyom	"Follow the Ocean"	27	3	336	5	8	6
8	Sevak Khanagyan	"Qami"	59	12	4,146	12	24	1
9	Mariam	"Fade"	34	6	898	7	13	4
10	Asmik Shiroyan	"You and I"	42	8	740	6	14	3

Detailed Jury Votes
R/O	Song	Juror 1	Juror 2	Juror 3	Juror 4	Juror 5	Juror 6	Total
1	"Escape"	10	5	5	5	4	1	30
2	"What You Hide"	3	4	1	8	1	2	19
3	"Puerto Rico"	1	1	2	1	2	8	15
4	"The Voice"	2	8	6	3	5	3	27
5	"Waiting for the Sun"	8	10	8	10	10	10	56
6	"Stare at Me"	7	7	4	7	12	5	42
7	"Follow the Ocean"	4	6	3	4	6	4	27
8	"Qami"	12	3	12	12	8	12	59
9	"Fade"	6	5	7	2	7	7	34
10	"You and I"	5	12	10	6	3	6	42
International Jury Members
Malta: Gordon Bonello (Show producer, creative director); Denmark: Molly Plank (Executive producer); Iceland: Felix Bergsson (TV and radio presenter); Czech Republic: Jan Bors (TV producer); Belarus: Olga Salamakha (TV producer); Georgia: Natia Mshvenieradze (International projects manager)

==== Final ====
The final took place on 25 February 2018. The ten entries that qualified from the preceding two semi-finals competed and the winner, "Qami" performed by Sevak Khanagyan, was selected by the 50/50 combination of votes from a nine-member international jury and a public vote. In addition to the performances of the competing entries, the interval act featured Armenian 2017 Eurovision entrant Artsvik with "Fly with Me" and "No Fear".

Final – 25 February 2018
R/O	Artist	Song	Jury		Televote		Total	Place
R/O	Artist	Song	Votes	Points	Votes	Points	Total	Place
1	Sevak Khanagyan	"Qami"	84	12	11,391	12	24	1
2	Gevorg Harutyunyan	"Stand Up"	40	3	2,849	5	8	7
3	Lusine Mardanyan	"If You Don't Walk Me Home"	54	7	343	1	8	8
4	Kamil Show	"Puerto Rico"	35	2	5,961	10	12	4
5	Amalia Margaryan	"Waiting for the Sun"	64	8	3,507	7	15	3
6	Nemra	"I'm a Liar"	75	10	5,815	8	18	2
7	Mariam	"Fade"	47	5	1,445	4	9	5
8	Mger Armenia	"Forever"	31	1	3,364	6	7	9
9	Robert Koloyan	"Get Away with Us"	41	4	872	2	6	10
10	Asmik Shiroyan	"You and I"	51	6	1,229	3	9	6

Detailed Jury Votes
R/O	Song	Juror 1	Juror 2	Juror 3	Juror 4	Juror 5	Juror 6	Juror 7	Juror 8	Juror 9	Total
1	"Qami"	10	3	12	12	10	12	6	7	12	84
2	"Stand Up"	1	8	4	2	5	8	3	6	3	40
3	"If You Don't Walk Me Home"	4	6	2	6	3	10	8	10	5	54
4	"Puerto Rico"	2	1	1	5	12	7	1	5	1	35
5	"Waiting for the Sun"	7	7	7	10	7	4	12	8	2	64
6	"I'm a Liar"	8	4	10	7	8	6	10	12	10	75
7	"Fade"	5	5	5	8	6	3	5	4	6	47
8	"Forever"	6	10	3	1	2	2	2	1	4	31
9	"Get Away with Us"	12	2	6	3	1	1	7	2	7	41
10	"You and I"	3	12	8	4	4	5	4	3	8	51
International Jury Members
Italy: Nicola Caligiore (ESC Head of Delegation); Belarus: Olga Salamakha (TV producer); Sweden: Sacha Jean-Baptiste (Artistic director); Georgia: Natia Mshvenieradze (International projects manager); Malta: Gordon Bonello (Show producer, creative director); Estonia: Mart Normet (Producer); Romania: Ovi (Singer-songwriter, producer); France: Edoardo Grassi (ESC Head of Delegation); Sweden: Christer Björkman (Producer, Singer)

=== Preparation ===
Sevak Khanagyan filmed the official video for "Qami" following his win at Depi Evratesil 2018, which was directed by Arthur Manukyan and featured fashion designs by Aram Nikolyan. The video was previewed on 16 March and released via the official Eurovision Song Contest's YouTube channel on 21 March 2018.

=== Promotion ===
Sevak Khanagyan made several appearances across Europe to specifically promote "Qami" as the Armenian Eurovision entry. On 7 April, Sevak Khanagyan performed during the Eurovision Pre-Party, which was held at the VEGAS Kuntsevo shopping mall in Moscow, Russia. Between 8 and 11 April, Khanagyan took part in promotional activities in Tel Aviv, Israel and performed during the Israel Calling event held at the Rabin Square. On 14 April, Khanagyan performed during the Eurovision in Concert event which was held at the AFAS Live venue in Amsterdam, Netherlands and hosted by Edsilia Rombley and Cornald Maas. Khanagyan also performed during the ESPreParty event on 21 April which was held at the Sala La Riviera venue in Madrid, Spain and hosted by Soraya Arnelas.

== At Eurovision ==
All countries except the "Big Five" (France, Germany, Italy, Spain and the United Kingdom), and the host country, are required to qualify from one of two semi-finals in order to compete for the final; the top ten countries from each semi-final progress to the final. The European Broadcasting Union (EBU) split up the competing countries into six different pots based on voting patterns from previous contests, with countries with favourable voting histories put into the same pot. On 29 January 2018, a special allocation draw was held which placed each country into one of the two semi-finals, as well as which half of the show they would perform in. Armenia was placed into the first semi-final, to be held on 8 May 2018, and was scheduled to perform in the second half of the show.

Once all the competing songs for the 2018 contest had been released, the running order for the semi-finals was decided by the shows' producers rather than through another draw, so that similar songs were not placed next to each other. Armenia was set to perform in position 16, following the entry from Finland and before the entry from Switzerland.

In Armenia, the two semi-finals and the final were broadcast on Armenia 1 and Public Radio of Armenia with commentary by Avet Barseghyan and Felix Khachatryan. The Armenian spokesperson, who announced the top 12-point score awarded by the Armenian jury during the final, was Arsen Grigoryan.

=== Semi-final ===
Sevak Khanagyan took part in technical rehearsals on 2 and 6 May, followed by dress rehearsals on 9 and 10 May. This included the jury show on 9 May where the professional juries of each country watched and voted on the competing entries.

The Armenian performance featured Sevak Khanagyan wearing a long gray jacket performing alone on stage and surrounded by monoliths in various heights. The stage lighting displayed white colours before transitioning to red and white. Sevak Khanagyan was joined by five off-stage backing vocalists: Arevik Grigoryan, Julieta Grigoryan, Mnats Khanagyan, Monika Manucharova and Sevak Musakhanyan. Monika Manucharova previously represented Armenia in the Junior Eurovision Song Contest in 2008.

At the end of the show, Armenia was not announced among the top 10 entries in the first semi-final and therefore failed to qualify to compete in the final. It was later revealed that Armenia placed fifteenth in the semi-final, receiving a total of 79 points: 41 points from the televoting and 38 points from the juries.

=== Voting ===
Voting during the three shows involved each country awarding two sets of points from 1-8, 10 and 12: one from their professional jury and the other from televoting. Each nation's jury consisted of five music industry professionals who are citizens of the country they represent, with their names published before the contest to ensure transparency. This jury judged each entry based on: vocal capacity; the stage performance; the song's composition and originality; and the overall impression by the act. In addition, no member of a national jury was permitted to be related in any way to any of the competing acts in such a way that they cannot vote impartially and independently. The individual rankings of each jury member as well as the nation's televoting results were released shortly after the grand final.

Below is a breakdown of points awarded to Armenia and awarded by Armenia in the first semi-final and grand final of the contest, and the breakdown of the jury voting and televoting conducted during the two shows:

==== Points awarded to Armenia ====
Points awarded to Armenia (Semi-final 1)
Score	Televote	Jury
12 points	Belarus	
10 points		Austria
8 points	Czech Republic	
7 points		
6 points	Belgium; Bulgaria	Belgium
5 points	Greece	Israel
4 points	Cyprus	Belarus; Portugal
3 points		Finland
2 points		Bulgaria; Czech Republic; United Kingdom
1 point		

==== Points awarded by Armenia ====
Points awarded by Armenia (Semi-final 1)
Score	Televote	Jury
12 points	Cyprus	Israel
10 points	Belarus	Cyprus
8 points	Greece	Estonia
7 points	Czech Republic	Czech Republic
6 points	Austria	Belgium
5 points	Estonia	Albania
4 points	Israel	Austria
3 points	Belgium	Switzerland
2 points	Bulgaria	Greece
1 point	Croatia	Belarus

Points awarded by Armenia (Final)
Score	Televote	Jury
12 points	Cyprus	Sweden
10 points	Israel	Moldova
8 points	Czech Republic	Israel
7 points	Norway	Cyprus
6 points	Austria	Czech Republic
5 points	France	Germany
4 points	Ukraine	France
3 points	Italy	Netherlands
2 points	Estonia	Australia
1 point	Moldova	Austria

==== Detailed voting results ====
The following members comprised the Armenian jury:

- Aram Gevorgyan (Aramo; jury chairperson) – singer, actor
- Alla Levonyan – singer, composer
- Armen Galyan – stylist, fashion editor
- Masha Mnjoyan – singer
- Shushanik Arevshatyan – producer

Detailed voting results from Armenia (Semi-final 1)
R/O	Country	Jury							Televote	
R/O	Country	A. Galyan	Aramo	Manch	M. Mnjoyan	S. Arevshatyan	Rank	Points	Rank	Points
01	Azerbaijan	18	18	18	18	18	18		17	
02	Iceland	17	6	12	14	12	14		18	
03	Albania	5	5	5	8	10	6	5	15	
04	Belgium	6	7	9	10	1	5	6	8	3
05	Czech Republic	3	3	11	4	3	4	7	4	7
06	Lithuania	15	17	3	16	17	13		12	
07	Israel	1	2	8	2	2	1	12	7	4
08	Belarus	9	12	6	9	6	10	1	2	10
09	Estonia	4	1	7	3	8	3	8	6	5
10	Bulgaria	11	13	15	12	9	15		9	2
11	Macedonia	12	15	14	17	15	16		16	
12	Croatia	10	11	16	5	13	12		10	1
13	Austria	14	8	2	11	5	7	4	5	6
14	Greece	13	9	1	13	14	9	2	3	8
15	Finland	16	16	17	15	11	17		13	
16	Armenia									
17	Switzerland	8	10	4	6	7	8	3	11	
18	Ireland	7	14	10	7	16	11		14	
19	Cyprus	2	4	13	1	4	2	10	1	12

Detailed voting results from Armenia (Final)
R/O	Country	Jury							Televote	
R/O	Country	A. Galyan	Aramo	Manch	M. Mnjoyan	S. Arevshatyan	Rank	Points	Rank	Points
01	Ukraine	19	7	20	17	24	19		7	4
02	Spain	23	19	15	20	26	23		19	
03	Slovenia	24	18	19	24	20	26		25	
04	Lithuania	16	8	5	21	18	14		13	
05	Austria	18	9	7	10	8	10	1	5	6
06	Estonia	13	17	4	12	22	13		9	2
07	Norway	9	10	14	6	21	12		4	7
08	Portugal	10	16	6	16	17	15		26	
09	United Kingdom	21	15	10	15	12	18		22	
10	Serbia	26	14	21	22	19	21		20	
11	Germany	4	13	12	7	10	6	5	12	
12	Albania	15	12	24	14	9	17		23	
13	France	3	11	13	9	13	7	4	6	5
14	Czech Republic	6	2	9	11	11	5	6	3	8
15	Denmark	11	20	18	19	16	20		14	
16	Australia	25	21	8	5	7	9	2	21	
17	Finland	22	22	16	18	23	24		16	
18	Bulgaria	7	23	22	13	4	11		11	
19	Moldova	12	1	1	1	6	2	10	10	1
20	Sweden	1	6	2	2	1	1	12	24	
21	Hungary	20	24	26	25	15	25		18	
22	Israel	2	3	3	4	3	3	8	2	10
23	Netherlands	8	25	11	8	5	8	3	15	
24	Ireland	14	5	17	23	25	16		17	
25	Cyprus	5	4	23	3	2	4	7	1	12
26	Italy	17	26	25	26	14	22		8	3
