= Tamzara (album) =

Studio album by Inga and Anush
- Released: 2006
- Genre: Folk, Folk Pop, Folk Rock
- Length: 44:21
- Label: Parseghian Records

Inga and Anush chronology
We and our Mountains (2003)	Tamzara (2006)	Heartbeat of my Land (2009)

Tamzara (Armenian: Թամզարա Tamzara) is the second album by Armenian folk singers Inga and Anush.

== Track listing ==
No.	Title	Length
1.	"Թամզարա" (Tamzara)	4:32
2.	"Յայլավոր յարս" (Yaylavor yars)	3:43
3.	"Դինո" (Dino)	3:23
4.	"Թագվորի գովք" (Tagvori govq)	3:40
5.	"Խլպանե" (Khlpane)	3:36
6.	"Փետրվարին գարունքը վռազելա" (Petrvarin garunqệ vr'azela)	3:41
7.	"Րուրի" (Ruri)	6:21
8.	"Ջուխտակ մոմ" (Jukhtak Mom)	2:49
9.	"Այգ" (Ayg)	1:55
10.	"Ծես-եռապատում" (Tses-yerrapatum)	5:29
11.	"Էլինար" (Elinar)	5:07
