= Asmik Shiroyan =

Armenian-Ukrainian singer (born 1993)

Asmik Shyroian
- Born: Hasmik Shiroyan; 20 April 1993 (age 33); Yerevan, Armenia
- Origin: Dnipro, Ukraine
- Genres: Pop; R&B; jazz
- Occupations: Singer; songwriter
- Years active: 2014–present
- Website: asmikshiroyan.com

Hasmik "Asmik" Shiroyan (Armenian: Հասմիկ Շիրոյան, Ukrainian: Асмік Широян, Russian: Асмик Широян; born 20 April 1993) is an Armenian-Ukrainian singer and songwriter. She is best known for competing in season four of The Voice of Ukraine, Depi Evratesil 2017, and Depi Evratesil 2018.

== Life and career ==
=== Early life ===
Shiroyan was born on 20 April 1993 in Yerevan, Armenia. When she was three years old, the family left Armenia and settled in Dnipropetrovsk, Ukraine. In Ukraine, she continued to study the Armenian language. Shiroyan began studying piano at age five, and began singing at age 13. From 2008 to 2010, she studied at the Dnipropetrovsk Medical Lyceum. She later began attending Dnipropetrovsk National University, and graduated with a degree in psychology in 2015.

=== 2014–present: The Voice of Ukraine and Depi Evratesil ===
In 2014, Shiroyan decided to take part in season four of The Voice of Ukraine, auditioning with the Polish song "Dziwny jest ten świat" by Czesław Niemen. She joined the team of Ani Lorak, but was eliminated in the third round of the show.

In 2016, Shiroyan decided to take part in Depi Evratesil 2017, Armenia's national selection for the Eurovision Song Contest 2017. After her audition, she chose to join the team of Iveta Mukuchyan. She was eliminated from the competition in the fourth round. Her elimination caused outcry amongst viewers, who created an online petition to bring her back to the competition. After the competition, Shiroyan performed her first Armenian concert in Yerevan. She also went on to work with the music industry service provider The Famous Company later that year. On 27 December 2017, it was confirmed that Shiroyan would return to Depi Evratesil in Depi Evratesil 2018. Her song "You & I" was revealed on 17 January 2018. She qualified from the second semi-final on 21 February, but placed fifth in the final on 25 February.

== Discography ==
=== Singles ===
Single	Year	Album
"The Code"	2016	Non-album singles
"Mine Alone"	2017	Non-album singles
"Got a Love for You"	2017	Non-album singles
"You & I"	2018	Non-album singles
