= Gevorg Harutyunyan =

Armenian singer

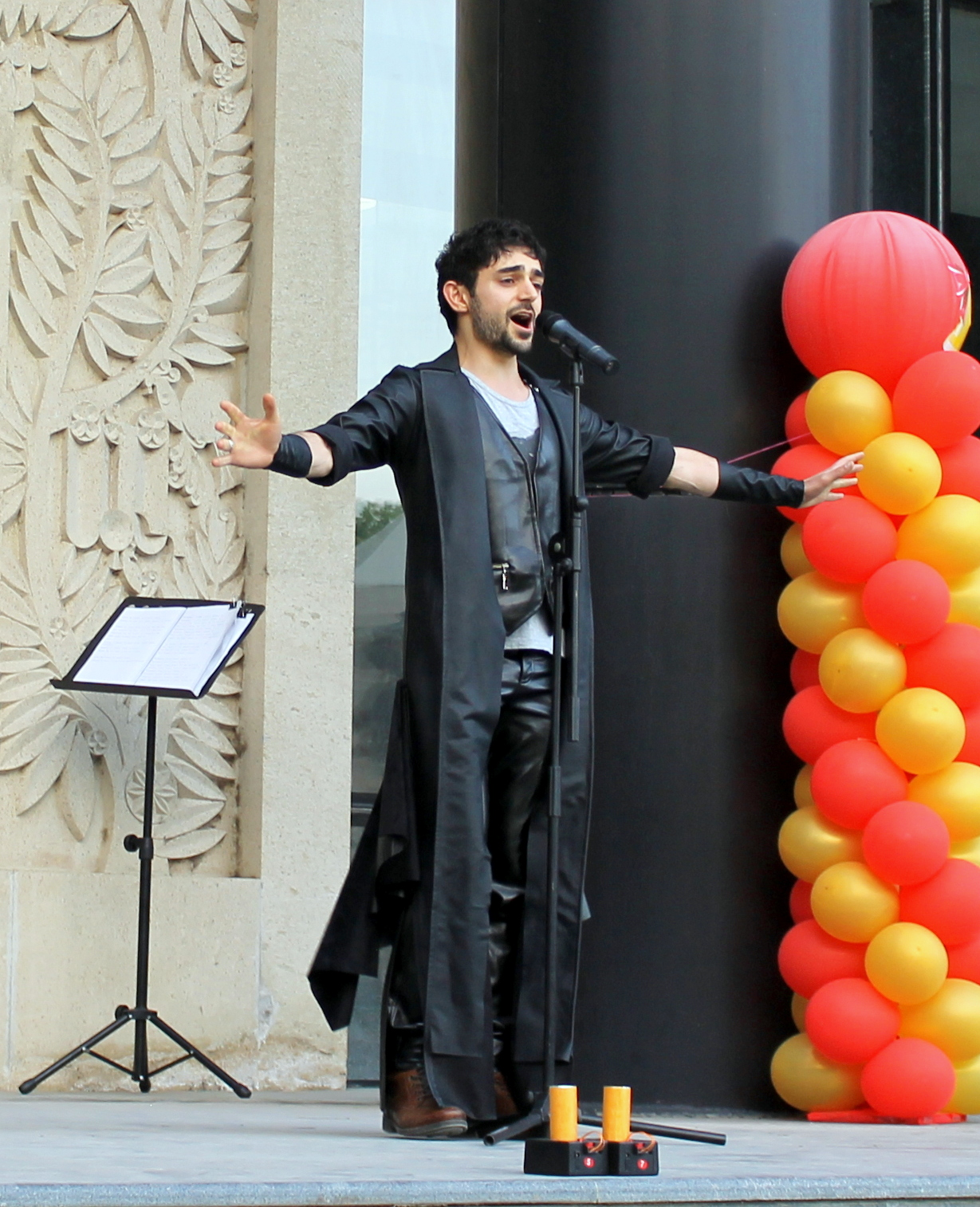

Gevorg Gagiki Harutyunyan (Armenian: Գևորգ Գագիկի Հարությունյան, born in 1990) is an Armenian artist, singer-songwriter and dancer. He represented Armenia in the 2018 New Wave Contest in Sochi, Russia. In 2014, Harutyunyan won the fourth season of Parahandes (the Armenian version of the British television series Strictly Come Dancing).

== Filmography ==
As himself
Year	Title	Notes
2016–2017	Depi Evratesil 2017 (Դեպի Եվրատեսիլ)	Participant
2018	Depi Evratesil 2018	Participant
2025	Depi Evratesil 2025	Participant
