= Menq Enq Ays Sarerệ =

Menq Enq Ays Sarerệ We and our Mountains

Studio album by Inga and Anush
- Released: March 2003
- Genre: Folk, Folk Pop, Folk Rock
- Length: 43:26
- Label: Saaz Productions

Inga and Anush chronology
Menq Enq Ays Sarerệ; We and our Mountains (2003)	Tamzara (2006)

Menq Enq Ays Sarerệ (Armenian: Մենք Ենք Այս Սարերը We are these mountains), or by its English title We and our Mountains, is the debut album by Armenian folk singers Inga and Anush.

== Track listing ==
No.	Title	Length
1.	"Անձրև եկավ" (Andzrev yekav)	3:37
2.	"Պար" (Par)	4:38
3.	"Կոմիտասի հետ" (Komitasi het)	2:39
4.	"Օրոր" (Oror)	4:14
5.	"Խաչված քարեր" (Khachvats qarer)	3:49
6.	"Մարդն իր դուռը չի փակի" (Mardn ir durệ chi paki)	4:17
7.	"Բեմ" (Bem)	4:00
8.	"Կռունկ" (Krrunk)	4:29
9.	"Հայրենիք" (Hayrenik)	4:35
10.	"Հայկական էսքիզներ" (Haykakan esqizner)	2:35
11.	"Ես իմ տեղը չեմ գտնում" (Yes im teghệ chem gtnum)	4:27
