= Armenia in the Eurovision Song Contest 2017 =

- Eurovision Song Contest 2017
- Participating broadcaster: Public Television of Armenia (AMPTV)
- Country: Armenia
- Selection process: Artist: Depi Evratesil; Song: Internal Selection
- Selection date: 24 December 2016; Song: 9 March 2017

Competing entry
- Song: "Fly with Me"
- Artist: Artsvik
- Songwriters: Lilith Navasardyan; Levon Navasardyan; Avet Barseghyan; David Tserunyan

Placement
- Semi-final result: Qualified (7th, 152 points)
- Final result: 18th, 79 points

Participation chronology

Armenia was represented at the Eurovision Song Contest 2017 with the song "Fly with Me" written by Lilith Navasardyan, Levon Navasardyan, Avet Barseghyan and David Tserunyan. The song was performed by Artsvik, who was selected through the national final Depi Evratesil organised by the Armenian broadcaster Public Television of Armenia (AMPTV) to represent Armenia in the 2017 contest in Kyiv, Ukraine. The national final involved 75 contestants and took place over three months. Two contestants ultimately qualified to compete in the final on 24 December 2016 where a jury panel and a public televote selected Artsvik as the winner. The song "Fly with Me" was selected internally and later presented to the public on 18 March 2017.

Armenia was drawn to compete in the first semi-final of the Eurovision Song Contest which took place on 9 May 2017. Performing during the show in position 16, "Fly with Me" was announced among the top 10 entries of the first semi-final and therefore qualified to compete in the final on 13 May. It was later revealed that Armenia placed seventh out of the 18 participating countries in the semi-final with 152 points. In the final, Armenia performed in position 5 and placed eighteenth out of the 26 participating countries with 79 points.

== Background ==
Prior to the 2017 contest, Armenia had participated in the Eurovision Song Contest ten times since its first entry in 2006. Its highest placing in the contest, to this point, has been fourth place, which the nation achieved on two occasions: in 2008 with the song "Qélé, Qélé" performed by Sirusho and in 2014 with the song "Not Alone" performed by Aram Mp3. Armenia had, to this point, failed to qualify to the final on only one occasion in 2011. The nation briefly withdrew from the contest in 2012 due to long-standing tensions with then host country Azerbaijan. In 2016, "LoveWave" performed by Iveta Mukuchyan placed seventh in the final.

The Armenian national broadcaster, Public Television of Armenia (AMPTV), broadcasts the event within Armenia and organises the selection process for the nation's entry. AMPTV confirmed their intentions to participate at the 2017 Eurovision Song Contest on 30 June 2016. Armenia has used various methods to select the Armenian entry in the past, such as a live televised national final to choose the performer, song or both to compete at Eurovision. However internal selections have also been held on occasion. Since 2014, the broadcaster internally selected both the artist and the song. However, AMPTV announced along with their participation confirmation that a national final would be organized to select the Armenian performer for the 2017 contest, with the song being internally selected.

== Before Eurovision ==
=== Depi Evratesil ===
Depi Evratesil (Towards Eurovision) was the first edition of the national final Depi Evratesil and selected the Armenian representative for the Eurovision Song Contest 2017. The competition involved a three-month-long process that commenced on 1 October 2016 and concluded with a winning artist on 24 December 2016. All shows in the competition took place at the AMPTV studios in Yerevan, hosted by Gohar Gasparyan and broadcast on Armenia 1 as well as online via the broadcaster's website 1tv.am.

==== Format ====
The national final took place over four stages and consisted of ten episodes. The first stage was the auditions, aired between 1 and 15 October 2016. Following the auditions, 37 contestants were selected by a six-member judging panel to proceed to the second stage of the competition. The second stage was the Judges Selection, aired between 22 October and 12 November 2016 where each member of the judging panel selected four contestants for their teams. If the judges liked the performance, they had the option of pressing a button in front of them during the last ten seconds of each performance, with the first judge that pressed the button getting the contestant who would proceed to the third stage of the competition. The third stage was titled One of Two stage and aired between 19 November and 3 December 2016 where the judges selected two of their team members to battle against each other. The team's judge awarded three points to his/her favourite contestant and the other five judges awarded one point to their favourite contestant. The contestant that received the least points was eliminated. The two remaining contestants in each team battled against each other during the final round and the team's judge selected one contestant to proceed to the fourth stage, the Live Shows. Two semi-finals took place on 10 and 17 December 2016 where two contestants were eliminated per show. The two remaining contestants proceeded to the live final on 24 December 2016 where the winner was selected from the two finalists.

The results of the first three stages of the national final were determined exclusively by the six-member judging panel, while results of the live shows were determined by the 50/50 combination of votes from a jury panel and a public vote. The public were able to cast their votes via SMS, while the members of the jury panel varied in composition from show to show. The judging panel was made up of six previous Armenian Eurovision entrants and consisted of:

- Iveta Mukuchyan (2016)
- Essaï Altounian (2015)
- Aram Mp3 (2014)
- Inga Arshakyan (2009 and 2015)
- Anush Arshakyan (2009)
- Hayko (2007)

==== Contestants ====
On 6 July 2016, AMPTV announced an online application period with a deadline of 13 November 2016. Eligible applicants were those aged at least 16 and are of Armenian citizenship or heritage. The broadcaster received more than 120 applications at the closing of the deadline, among them being artists from the worldwide Armenian diaspora in the United States, France, Spain, Russia, Ukraine, Georgia, Uzbekistan and Lebanon. 75 of the applicants performed in front of the six-member judging panel during the auditions held in September 2016 and had two minutes to convince the judges, which focused on the artists vocal capacity, the performance on stage, and the overall impression by the act. 37 contestants were selected to proceed to the Judges Selection as more than three judges pressed their buttons for their performances.

==== Teams ====
- Winner
- Runner-up
- Third place
- Fourth place
- Eliminated in Semi-Final 1
- Eliminated in One of Two

Judges	Top 24 artists			
Anush Arshakyan	Marta	Alexander Plato	Anna Sedrakyan	Stepan Hovhannisyan
Hayko	Egine	Anna Danielyan	Yeva Kans	Amalia Margaryan
Iveta Mukuchyan	Vahe Aleksanyan	Asmik Shiroyan	Sona Dunoyan	Christina Mangasaryan
Aram Mp3	Lucy	Lilit Harutyunyan	Jujo	Saro Gevorgyan
Inga Arshakyan	Syuzanna Melqonyan	Gevorg Harutyunyan	Narine Jinanyan	Karina Harutyunyan
Essaï Altounian	Artsvik	Opera Viva	Marissa	Only Girls

==== Shows ====
===== Judges Selection =====
Episode 1 – 22 October 2016
Artist	Song	Seconds Left	Selected Judge
Veronika Grigoryan	"Rijeka bez imena"	Eliminated	N/A
Lucy	"Mercy"	10	Aram Mp3
Egine	"Sledgehammer"	9	Hayko
Syuzanna Melqonyan	"The Power of Love"	9	Inga
Opera Viva	"Nessun dorma"	10	Essaï
Mery Mheryan	"One Night Only"	Eliminated	N/A
Christina Mangasaryan	"Try"	10	Iveta
Saro Gevorgyan	"Bang Bang"	10	Aram Mp3
Rob Avalyan	"Yassou Maria"	Eliminated	N/A

Episode 2 – 29 October 2016
Artist	Song	Seconds Left	Selected Judge
Vahe Aleksanyan	"Tonight Again"	10	Iveta
Payla Kevorkian	"Too Close"	Eliminated	N/A
Marissa	"Sweet People"	Eliminated	Essaï (Note: According to the rules, all six judges must have four participants in their groups. However, when all participants finished their performances, Essaï had only three, so he was given a chance to choose his final team member from eliminated participants. As a result, Marissa was selected as Essaï's fourth team member at the end of the Day 4)
Jujo	"Virtual Insanity"	9	Aram Mp3
Albert Ghazaryan	"Pero te extraño"	Eliminated	N/A
Stepan Hovhannisyan	"Mamma Knows Best"	10	Anush
Artsvik	"Sweet Dreams"	10	Essaï
Armenuhi Gasparyan	"Feeling Good"	Eliminated	N/A
Anna Danielyan	"Dancing On My Own"	2	Hayko

Episode 3 – 5 November 2016
Artist	Song	Seconds Left	Selected Judge
Mariam Yevriyan	"Beggin'"	Eliminated	N/A
Lilit Harutyunyan	"All of Me"	10	Aram Mp3
Marta	"How Deep Is Your Love"	9	Anush
Diana Adamyan	"Bang Bang"	Eliminated	N/A
Kristina Avtisyan	"Hit the Road Jack"	Eliminated	N/A
Alexander Plato	"Monologue"	10	Anush
Anna Sedrakyan	"Wicked Game"	8	Anush
Diana Dikovski	"Georgia on My Mind"	Eliminated	N/A
Arthur Abgar	"Te quiero, te quiero"	Eliminated	N/A
Asmik Shiroyan	"Dziwny jest ten świat"	10	Iveta

Episode 4 – 12 November 2016
Artist	Song	Seconds Left	Selected Judge
Only Girls	"Kukushka" (The Cuckoo)	10	Essaï
Sona Dunoyan	"Sorry"	6	Iveta
Gevorg Harutyunyan	"It's a Man's Man's Man's World"	7	Inga
Axel Daveyan	"Feeling Good"	Eliminated	N/A
Karine Harutyunyan	"Listen"	10	Inga
Zemfira Fridon	"Simply the Best"	Eliminated	N/A
Yeva Kans	"We Are the World"	9	Hayko
Amalia Margaryan	"The Show Must Go On"	9	Hayko
Narine Jinanyan	"Love On Top"	10	Inga

===== One of Two =====
During the fifth and sixth episodes, twelve of the remaining contestants, two from each team, competed and one contestant per team advanced. During the seventh episode, the remaining two contestants from each team competed and one contestant per team qualified to the Live Shows.

Episode 5 – 19 November 2016
R/O	Judge	Artist	Song	Judges Votes						Total
R/O	Judge	Artist	Song	Anush	Hayko	Iveta	Aram Mp3	Inga	Essaï	Total
1	Aram Mp3	Saro Gevorgyan	"Cheating"				✔ ✔ ✔			3
1	Aram Mp3	Lucy	"Euphoria"	✔	✔	✔		✔	✔	5
2	Inga	Karina Harutyunyan	"Think"	✔						1
2	Inga	Gevorg Harutyunyan	"I Am Alive"		✔	✔	✔	✔ ✔ ✔	✔	7
3	Hayko	Amalia Margaryan	"Jason's Song (Gave It Away)"						✔	1
3	Hayko	Anna Danielyan	"I See Fire"	✔	✔ ✔ ✔	✔	✔	✔		7
4	Anush	Marta	"Back in the Day (Puff)"	✔ ✔ ✔	✔		✔	✔	✔	7
4	Anush	Stepan Hovhannisyan	"Say Something"			✔				1
5	Essaï	Only Girls	"Arshaluys er..."							0
5	Essaï	Artsvik	"If I Ain't Got You"	✔	✔	✔	✔	✔	✔ ✔ ✔	8
6	Iveta	Christina Mangasaryan	"I Put a Spell on You"	✔					✔	2
6	Iveta	Asmik Shiroyan	"Sweet Lovin'"		✔	✔ ✔ ✔	✔	✔		6

Episode 6 – 26 November 2016
R/O	Judge	Artist	Song	Judges Votes						Total
R/O	Judge	Artist	Song	Anush	Hayko	Iveta	Aram Mp3	Inga	Essaï	Total
1	Aram Mp3	Lilit Harutyunyan	"Price Tag"	✔	✔	✔		✔	✔	5
1	Aram Mp3	Jujo	"River"				✔ ✔ ✔			3
2	Inga	Narine Jinanyan	"Impossible"					✔ ✔ ✔		3
2	Inga	Syuzanna Melqonyan	"Ain't No Other Man"	✔	✔	✔	✔		✔	5
3	Hayko	Yeva Kans	"I'm Outta Love"				✔			1
3	Hayko	Egine	"Tired"/"Burnin' Up"	✔	✔ ✔ ✔	✔		✔	✔	7
4	Anush	Anna Sedrakyan	"Seven Nation Army"							0
4	Anush	Alexander Plato	"Ke qeler" / "Lily"	✔ ✔ ✔	✔	✔	✔	✔	✔	8
5	Essaï	Opera Viva	"Maria"	✔		✔	✔		✔ ✔ ✔	6
5	Essaï	Marissa	"Stop!"		✔			✔		2
6	Iveta	Sona Dunoyan	"Dangerous Woman"				✔			1
6	Iveta	Vahe Aleksanyan	"My Prayer"	✔	✔	✔ ✔ ✔		✔	✔	7

Episode 7 – 3 December 2016
R/O	Judge	Artist	Song	Result
1	Iveta	Vahe Aleksanyan	"Radioactive"	Selected
1	Iveta	Asmik Shiroyan	"The Way You Make Me Feel"	Eliminated
2	Inga	Syuzanna Melqonyan	"And I Am Telling You I'm Not Going"	Selected
2	Inga	Gevorg Harutyunyan	"A Song for You"	Eliminated
3	Hayko	Egine	"Sexy Silk"	Selected
3	Hayko	Anna Danielyan	"Rumour Has It"	Eliminated
4	Essaï	Opera Viva	"You Raise Me Up"	Eliminated
4	Essaï	Artsvik	"Stand Up for Love"	Selected
5	Aram Mp3	Lucy	"Say Something"	Selected
5	Aram Mp3	Lilit Harutyunyan	"Nothing Compares 2 U"	Eliminated
6	Anush	Marta	"Siro Kamar" (Սիրո կամար)	Selected
6	Anush	Alexander Plato	"Faust Cantata"	Eliminated

===== Semi-finals =====
The two semi-finals took place on 10 and 17 December 2016. Two contestants were eliminated from each semi-final based on the 50/50 combination of votes from a professional jury and a public televote. The jury in the first semi-final consisted of nine Armenian members who each distributed their points from 1 to 6, while the jury in the second semi-final consisted of eleven international members who each distributed their points from 1 to 4. The viewers and the juries each had a total of 189 points in the first semi-final and 110 points in the second semi-final to award. The viewer vote was based on the percentage of votes each song achieved. For example, if a song gained 10% of the viewer vote, then that entry would be awarded 10% of all jury points rounded to the nearest integer: 19 points in the first semi-final and 11 points in the second semi-final. In addition to the performances of the contestants, the interval acts featured Armenian 2016 Junior Eurovision entrants Anahit and Mary with their song "Tarber" in the first semi-final, and Sos and Victoria Petrosyan with their quick-change acts in the second semi-final.

Semi-final 1 – 10 December 2016
R/O	Judge	Artist	Solo Song	Duet Song (with Judge)	Jury	Televote	Total	Place	Result
1	Anush	Marta	"Naughty Girl"	"Amenic Amena" (Ամենից ամենա)	48	49	97	1	Advanced
2	Essaï	Artsvik	"Hurt"	"Hayastan ashkharh" (Հայաստան աշխարհ)	32	39	71	2	Advanced
3	Hayko	Egine	"A Little Party Never Killed Nobody (All We Got)"	"Somos novios"	25	33	58	4	Advanced
4	Aram Mp3	Lucy	"Turn Around"	"Beneath Your Beautiful"	20	17	37	6	Eliminated
5	Inga	Syuzanna Melqonyan	"Je suis malade"	"Forma de vida"	31	36	67	3	Advanced
6	Iveta	Vahe Aleksanyan	"Writing's on the Wall"	"You're Nobody 'til Somebody Loves You"	33	15	48	5	Eliminated

Armenian Jury Members

- Naira Gyurjinyan (Conductor)
- Lira Kocharyan (Music producer)
- Lilit Navasardyan (Composer)
- Artur Asatryan (Music producer)
- Avet Barseghyan (TV presenter, songwriter)
- Artur Manukyan (TV producer)
- Kristina Avagimyan (Choreographer)
- Arthur Ghukasyan (TV producer)
- Nur (Designer, sculpture)

Semi-final 2 – 17 December 2016
R/O	Judge	Artist	First Song	Second Song (Eurovision Hit)	Jury	Televote	Total	Place	Result
1	Anush	Marta	"Popuri"	"Rhythm Inside"	21	40	61	2	Advanced
2	Inga	Syuzanna Melqonyan	"It's a Man's Man's Man's World"	"Sweet People"	30	24	54	3	Eliminated
3	Essaï	Artsvik	"Crazy"	"A Million Voices"	35	27	62	1	Advanced
4	Hayko	Egine	"Crazy in Love"	"Warrior"	24	19	43	4	Eliminated

International Jury Members

- Belarus – Olga Salamakha (TV presenter)
- Bulgaria – Joana Levieva-Sawyer (TV producer)
- Cyprus – Klitos Klitou (TV producer)
- Estonia – Mart Normet (TV producer)
- Georgia – Nodiko Tatishvili (Singer)
- Georgia – Sopho Gelovani (Singer)
- Lithuania – Audrius Giržadas (TV and radio journalist)
- Malta – Gordon Bonello (TV producer)
- Sweden – Christer Björkman (Producer, singer)
- Sweden – Sacha Jean-Baptiste (Artistic director)
- United Kingdom – William Lee Adams (Editor)

===== Final =====
The final took place on 24 December 2016. The two finalists that qualified from the second semi-final competed and the winner, Artsvik, was selected by the 50/50 combination of votes from a seven-member Panarmenian jury panel with members from the worldwide Armenian diaspora and a public televote. Both the jury and viewer vote were awarded based on the percentage of votes each song achieved. In addition to the performances of the contestants, the interval acts featured Cypriot 2017 Eurovision entrant Hovig with a mashup of his songs and "Hayi acher", and Armenia 2016 Eurovision entrant Iveta Mukuchyan with "LoveWave" and "Amenic amena".

Final – 24 December 2016
R/O	Judge	Artist	First Song	Song (Armenian Hit)	Jury	Televote	Total	Place
1	Anush	Marta	"Don't Stop the Music"/"Only Girl (In the World)"	"Tsov" (Ծով)	19%	10%	29%	2
2	Essaï	Artsvik	"I Have Nothing"	"Aprelu april" (Ապրելու ապրիլ)	31%	40%	71%	1

Pan-Armenian Jury Members

- Austria – Karen Asatryan (Musician, composer)
- Austria – Rita Movsesian (Singer)
- Belarus – Iskui Abalyan (Singer)
- France – Arthur Aharonyan (Violinist)
- Russia – Araksya Mushegyan (Music producer, composer)
- United Kingdom – Anais Heghoyan (Opera singer)
- United Kingdom – Arthur Gourounlian (Dancer, choreographer)

=== Song selection ===
Following Artsvik's win at Depi Evratesil 2017 on 24 December 2016, AMPTV announced a public call for song submissions with a deadline of 30 January 2017. More than 300 songs were submitted by songwriters worldwide and ten songs were under consideration. The song "Fly with Me", composed by Lilith Navasardyan and Levon Navasardyan with lyrics by Avet Barseghyan and David Tserunyan, was announced as the Armenian entry on 9 March 2017. Artsvik filmed the official video for the song prior to the presentation, which was directed by Arthur Manukyan. The song and video were presented to the public on 18 March 2017.

=== Promotion ===
Artsvik made several appearances across Europe to specifically promote "Fly with Me" as the Armenian Eurovision entry. Between 3 and 6 April, Artsvik took part in promotional activities in Tel Aviv, Israel and performed during the Israel Calling event held at the Ha'teatron venue. On 14 April, Artsvik performed during the Eurovision in Concert event which was held at the Melkweg venue in Amsterdam, Netherlands and hosted by Cornald Maas and Selma Björnsdóttir. Artsvik had also planned to take part in the Eurovision Pre-Party event on 4 April which would be held in Moscow, Russia, however, her participation was cancelled following the event's suspension.

== At Eurovision ==
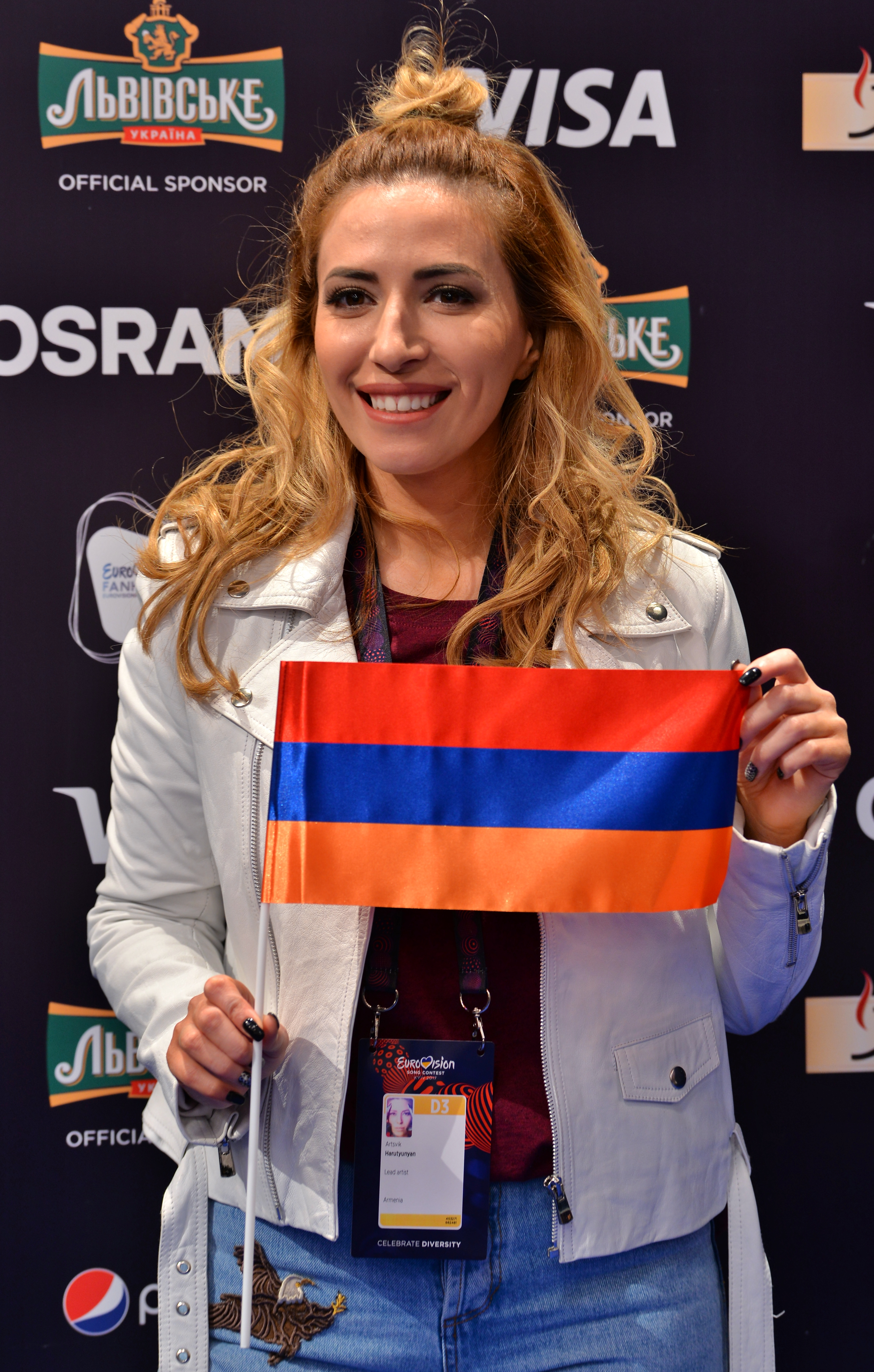
Artsvik during a press meet and greet

All countries except the "Big Five" (France, Germany, Italy, Spain and the United Kingdom), and the host country, are required to qualify from one of two semi-finals in order to compete for the final; the top ten countries from each semi-final progress to the final. The European Broadcasting Union (EBU) split up the competing countries into six different pots based on voting patterns from previous contests, with countries with favourable voting histories put into the same pot. On 31 January 2017, a special allocation draw was held which placed each country into one of the two semi-finals, as well as which half of the show they would perform in. Armenia was placed into the first semi-final, to be held on 9 May 2017, and was scheduled to perform in the second half of the show.

Once all the competing songs for the 2017 contest had been released, the running order for the semi-finals was decided by the shows' producers rather than through another draw, so that similar songs were not placed next to each other. Armenia was set to perform in position 16, following the entry from the Cyprus and before the entry from Slovenia.

In Armenia, the two semi-finals and the final were broadcast on Armenia 1 and Public Radio of Armenia with commentary by Avet Barseghyan and Gohar Gasparyan (first semi-final and final). The Armenian spokesperson, who announced the top 12-point score awarded by the Armenian jury during the final, was Iveta Mukuchyan who had previously represented Armenia in the Eurovision Song Contest in 2016.

=== Semi-final ===
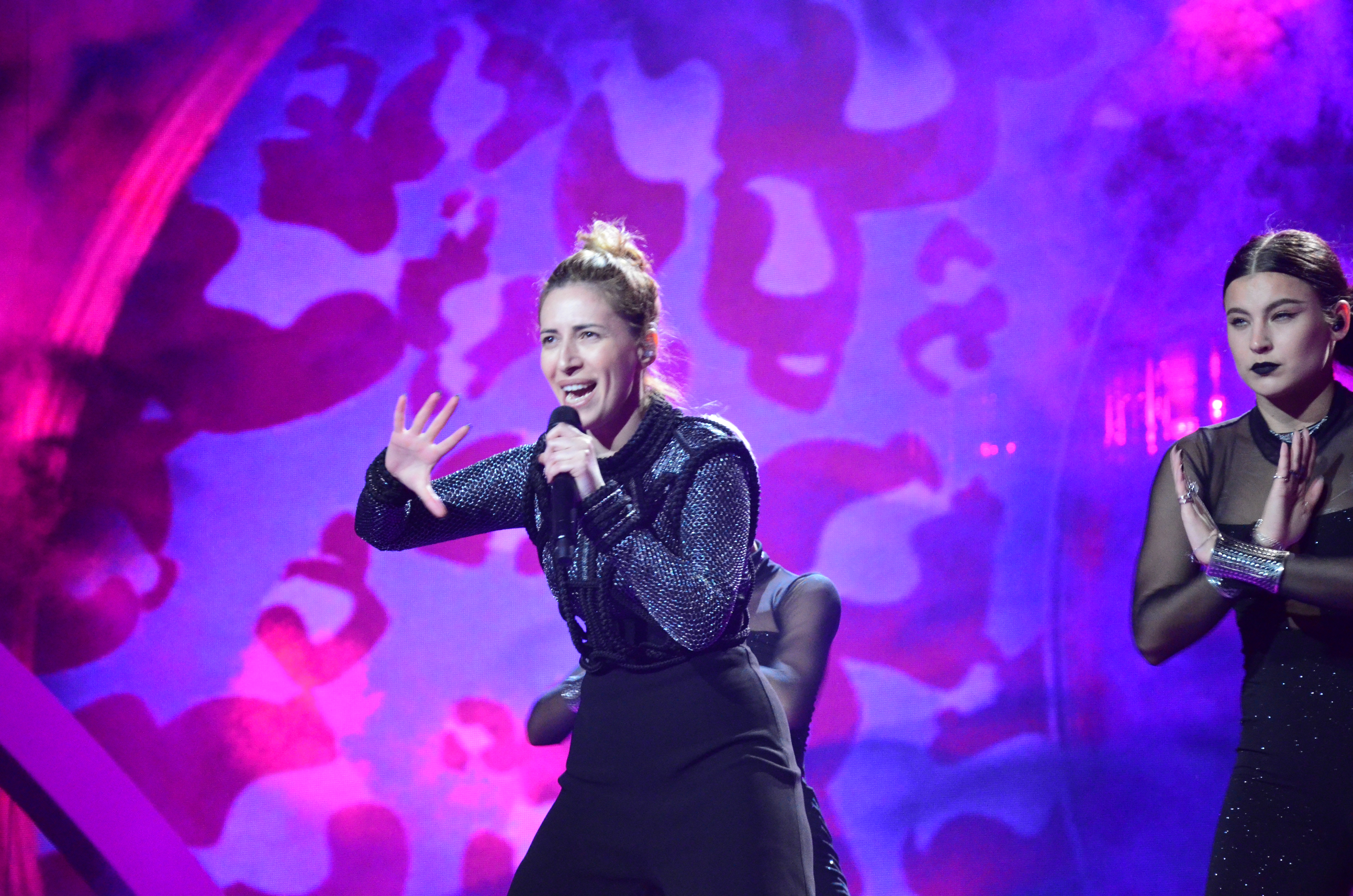
Artsvik during a rehearsal before the first semi-final

Artsvik took part in technical rehearsals on 1 and 5 May, followed by dress rehearsals on 8 and 9 May. This included the jury show on 9 May where the professional juries of each country watched and voted on the competing entries.

The Armenian performance featured Artsvik dressed in a black pant-suit and joined by two dancers on stage performing a routine which mainly involved hand movements. The stage presentation included smoke and pyrotechnic effects throughout the performance. The LED screens projected old traditional images in pink and purple colours with a hologram of a bird appearing and flying away at the end of the performance. The stage director and choreographer for the Armenian performance was Sacha Jean-Baptiste. The two dancers that joined Artsvik on stage were Fanny Svensson and Marlene Lindahl, while the singer was also joined by three off-stage backing vocalists: Anushik Ter-Ghukasyan, Amaliya Margaryan and Viktoria Pogosyan.

At the end of the show, Armenia was announced as having finished in the top 10 and subsequently qualifying for the grand final. It was later revealed that Armenia placed second in the semi-final, receiving a total of 152 points: 65 points from the televoting and 87 points from the juries.

=== Final ===
Shortly after the first semi-final, a winners' press conference was held for the ten qualifying countries. As part of this press conference, the qualifying artists took part in a draw to determine which half of the grand final they would subsequently participate in. This draw was done in the order the countries appeared in the semi-final running order. Armenia was drawn to compete in the first half. Following this draw, the shows' producers decided upon the running order of the final, as they had done for the semi-finals. Armenia was subsequently placed to perform in position 5, following the entry from Austria and before the entry from the Netherlands.

Artsvik once again took part in dress rehearsals on 12 and 13 May before the final, including the jury final where the professional juries cast their final votes before the live show. Artsvik performed a repeat of her semi-final performance during the final on 13 May. Armenia placed eighteenth in the final, scoring 79 points: 21 points from the televoting and 58 points from the juries.

=== Voting ===
Voting during the three shows involved each country awarding two sets of points from 1-8, 10 and 12: one from their professional jury and the other from televoting. Each nation's jury consisted of five music industry professionals who are citizens of the country they represent, with their names published before the contest to ensure transparency. This jury judged each entry based on: vocal capacity; the stage performance; the song's composition and originality; and the overall impression by the act. In addition, no member of a national jury was permitted to be related in any way to any of the competing acts in such a way that they cannot vote impartially and independently. The individual rankings of each jury member as well as the nation's televoting results were released shortly after the grand final.

Below is a breakdown of points awarded to Armenia and awarded by Armenia in the first semi-final and grand final of the contest, and the breakdown of the jury voting and televoting conducted during the two shows:

==== Points awarded to Armenia ====
Points awarded to Armenia (Semi-final 1)
Score	Televote	Jury
12 points		Greece
10 points	Georgia	Albania; Moldova
8 points	Cyprus; Greece	Montenegro
7 points	Belgium	Georgia
6 points	Poland	Italy; Poland
5 points	Australia; Czech Republic	Australia; Cyprus; United Kingdom
4 points	Finland; Moldova; Spain	Finland; Latvia; Portugal
3 points	Sweden	
2 points		
1 point	Latvia	Slovenia

Points awarded to Armenia (Final)
Score	Televote	Jury
12 points		
10 points	Georgia	
8 points		Greece
7 points		Albania
6 points	France	Moldova
5 points		Serbia
4 points		Bulgaria; Italy; Montenegro; San Marino
3 points		Georgia; Lithuania; Slovenia
2 points	Czech Republic; Greece	Hungary; Poland
1 point	Cyprus	Australia; Denmark; Malta

==== Points awarded by Armenia ====
Points awarded by Armenia (Semi-final 1)
Score	Televote	Jury
12 points	Cyprus	Cyprus
10 points	Moldova	Greece
8 points	Georgia	Moldova
7 points	Portugal	Portugal
6 points	Belgium	Georgia
5 points	Greece	Sweden
4 points	Sweden	Czech Republic
3 points	Australia	Iceland
2 points	Poland	Poland
1 point	Montenegro	Australia

Points awarded by Armenia (Final)
Score	Televote	Jury
12 points	Cyprus	Portugal
10 points	Portugal	Greece
8 points	France	Moldova
7 points	Bulgaria	Cyprus
6 points	Moldova	Sweden
5 points	Belgium	Norway
4 points	Italy	United Kingdom
3 points	Sweden	France
2 points	Romania	Italy
1 point	Greece	Austria

==== Detailed voting results ====
The following members comprised the Armenian jury:

- Ara Gevorgyan (jury chairperson) – musician, composer
- Emma Asatryan – vocal teacher, singer, songwriter
- Eduard Topchjan – conductor (jury member in semi-final 1)
- Aramayis Hayrapetyan – director
- Zaruhi Babayan – singer, vocal teacher
- Tigran Sanoyan – musician (jury member in the final)

Detailed voting results from Armenia (Semi-final 1)
R/O	Country	Jury							Televote	
R/O	Country	A. Gevorgyan	E. Asatryan	E. Topchjan	A. Hayrapetyan	Z. Babayan	Rank	Points	Rank	Points
01	Sweden	8	6	7	4	5	6	5	7	4
02	Georgia	2	5	5	9	6	5	6	3	8
03	Australia	12	14	8	10	7	10	1	8	3
04	Albania	16	13	15	16	16	16		12	
05	Belgium	13	7	14	14	15	13		5	6
06	Montenegro	14	16	16	15	14	15		10	1
07	Finland	10	12	11	8	13	12		14	
08	Azerbaijan	17	17	17	17	17	17		16	
09	Portugal	7	4	4	5	4	4	7	4	7
10	Greece	4	2	2	2	2	2	10	6	5
11	Poland	9	11	9	6	12	9	2	9	2
12	Moldova	3	3	3	3	3	3	8	2	10
13	Iceland	6	10	10	7	11	8	3	13	
14	Czech Republic	5	9	6	12	9	7	4	11	
15	Cyprus	1	1	1	1	1	1	12	1	12
16	Armenia									
17	Slovenia	11	8	12	11	10	11		15	
18	Latvia	15	15	13	13	8	14		17	

Detailed voting results from Armenia (Final)
R/O	Country	Jury							Televote	
R/O	Country	A. Gevorgyan	E. Asatryan	A. Hayrapetyan	T. Sanoyan	Z. Babayan	Rank	Points	Rank	Points
01	Israel	24	24	21	23	18	24		17	
02	Poland	11	12	14	9	21	12		24	
03	Belarus	19	11	24	24	15	22		15	
04	Austria	16	7	11	13	14	10	1	19	
05	Armenia									
06	Netherlands	2	21	22	17	13	15		13	
07	Moldova	4	3	3	2	2	3	8	5	6
08	Hungary	23	23	20	20	23	23		11	
09	Italy	10	9	4	22	7	9	2	7	4
10	Denmark	12	10	19	11	24	16		18	
11	Portugal	1	1	1	1	1	1	12	2	10
12	Azerbaijan	25	25	25	25	25	25		25	
13	Croatia	14	8	12	7	22	11		16	
14	Australia	21	22	10	21	11	19		21	
15	Greece	3	2	2	3	3	2	10	10	1
16	Spain	20	20	18	18	8	18		20	
17	Norway	6	6	9	10	10	6	5	22	
18	United Kingdom	9	14	7	8	6	7	4	14	
19	Cyprus	5	4	13	4	4	4	7	1	12
20	Romania	13	18	23	12	20	20		9	2
21	Germany	17	13	15	19	19	17		12	
22	Ukraine	15	15	17	6	16	14		23	
23	Belgium	22	16	16	16	17	21		6	5
24	Sweden	8	5	6	15	5	5	6	8	3
25	Bulgaria	18	19	8	14	9	13		4	7
26	France	7	17	5	5	12	8	3	3	8
