= Vardenik =

Village in Gegharkunik, Armenia

Vardenik Վարդենիկ
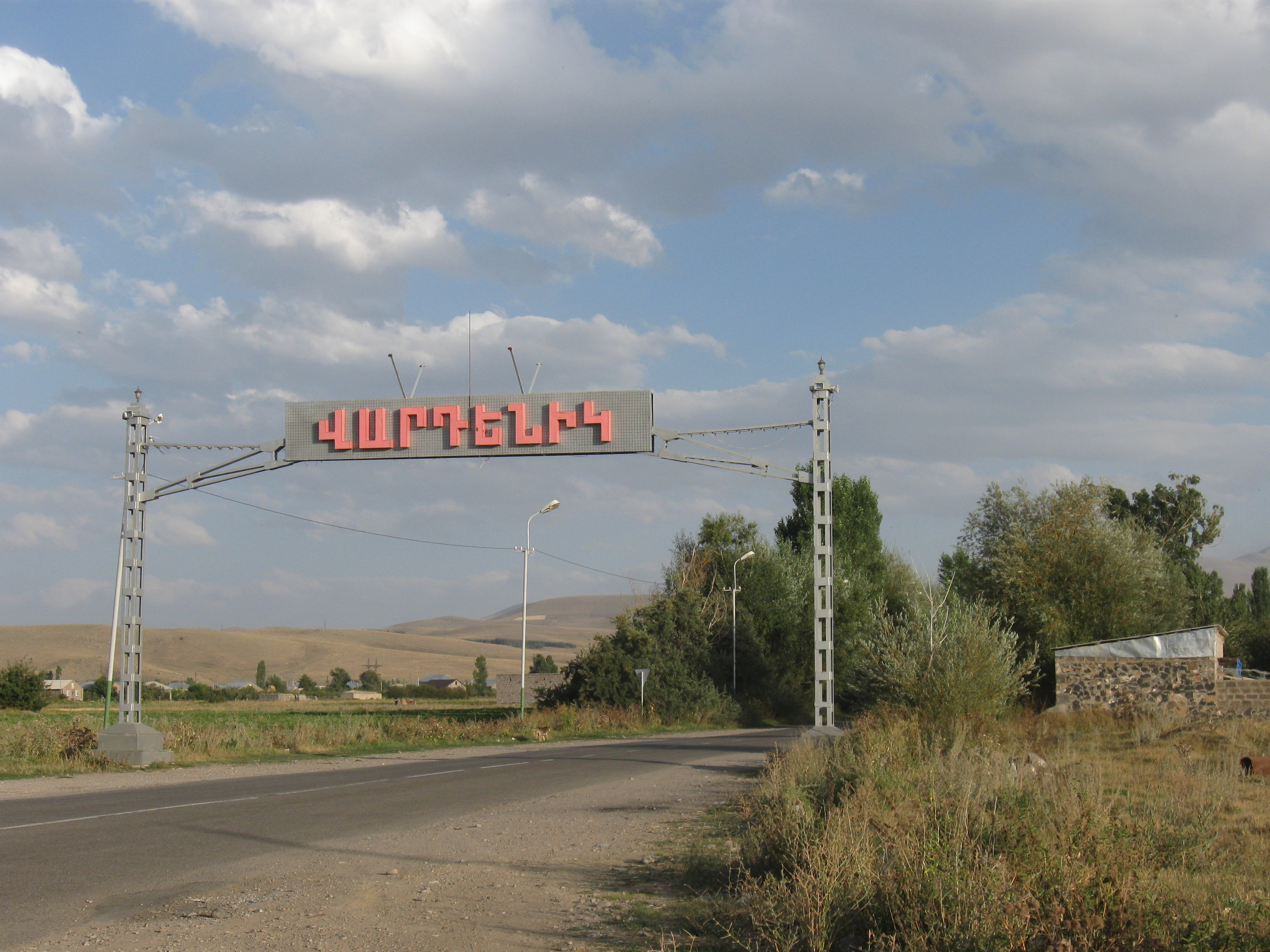
- The entrance to Vardenik

- Location within Armenia Location within Gegharkunik
- Coordinates: 40°07′59″N 45°26′12″E
- Country: Armenia
- Province: Gegharkunik
- Municipality: Martuni
- Founded: 1828-29
- Elevation: 1,994 m (6,542 ft)

Population (2011)
  - Total: 9,880
- Time zone: UTC+4 (AMT)
- Postal code: 1418

Vardenik (Armenian: Վարդենիկ) is a village in the Martuni Municipality of the Gegharkunik Province of Armenia, that sits along the Vardenis River. The cyclopean fort ruins of Kaftarli are located 3 km south of the village, with petroglyphs being present downhill along the bank of the river, among additional historic monuments. Some churches and shrines can be found in the vicinity. The village is the largest rural community in Armenia by population.

== Etymology ==
The village was previously known as Gezeldara, Nerkin Gezaldara, Gyuzeldara and Nizhnyaya Gezaldara.

== History ==
The village was founded in 1828-29 by emigrants from Mush.

== People ==
Arsen Grigoryan, singer and actor

== Gallery ==
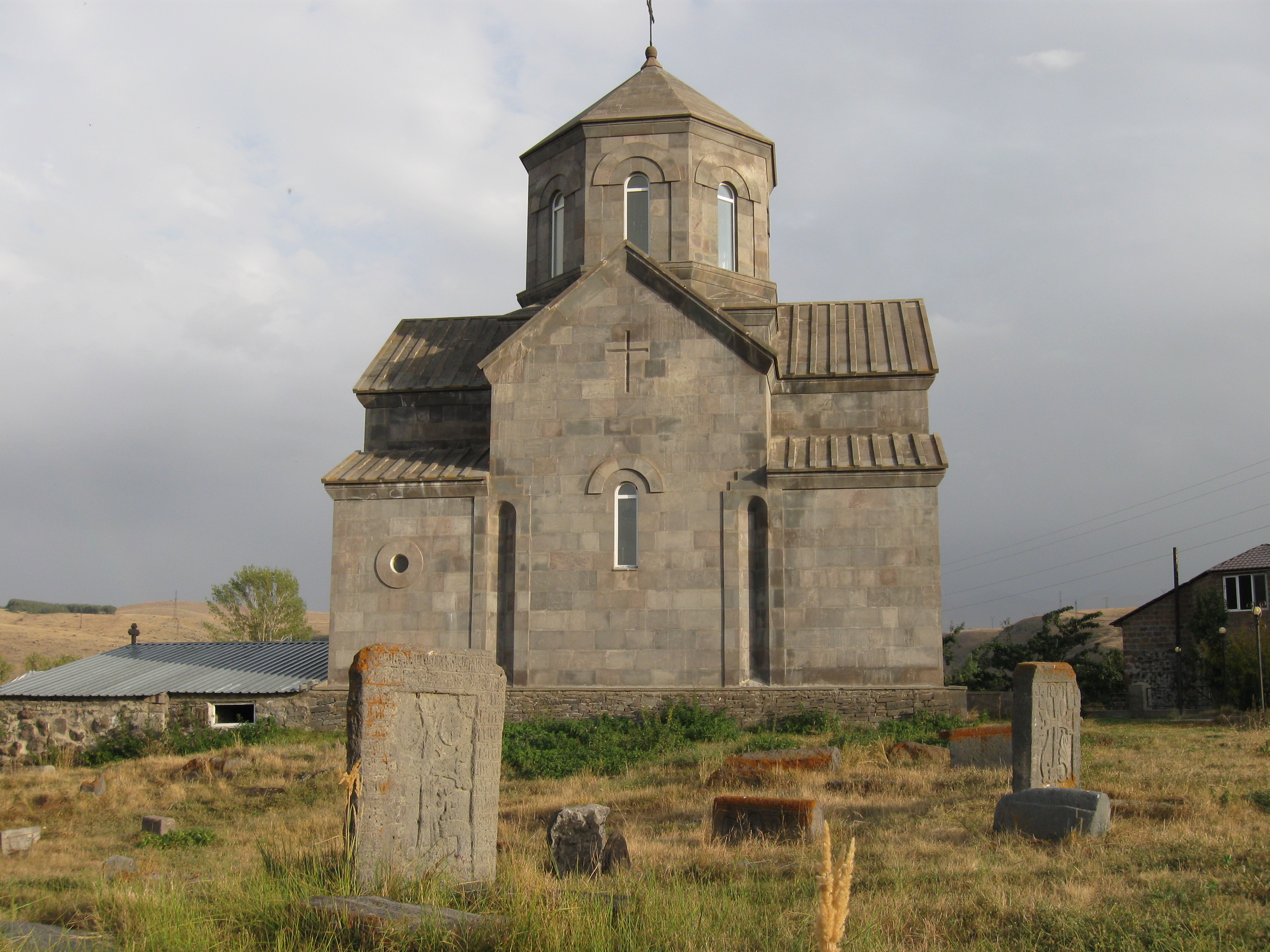
St. Astvatsatsin Church

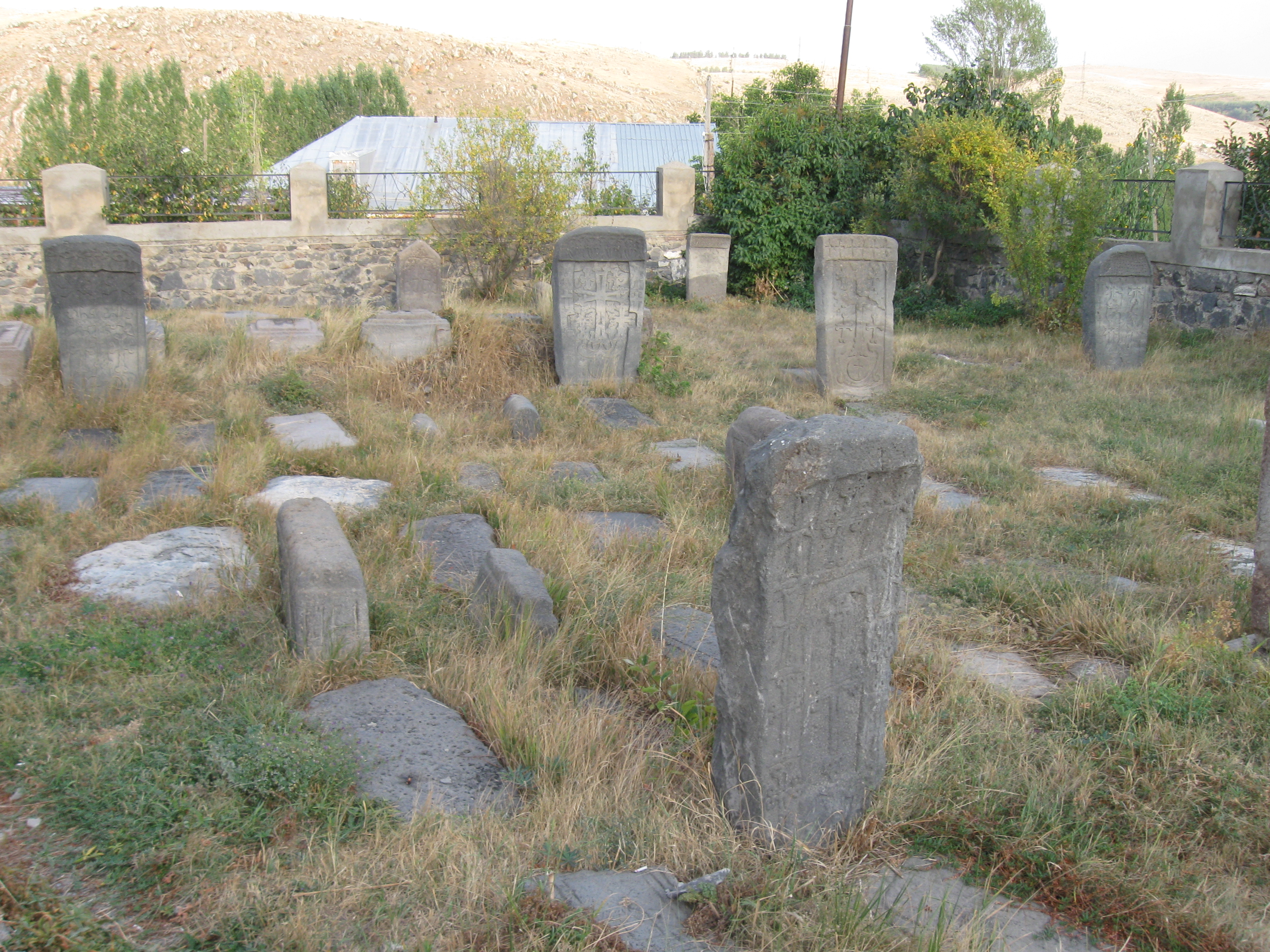
The medieval cemetery of St. Astvatsatsin Church

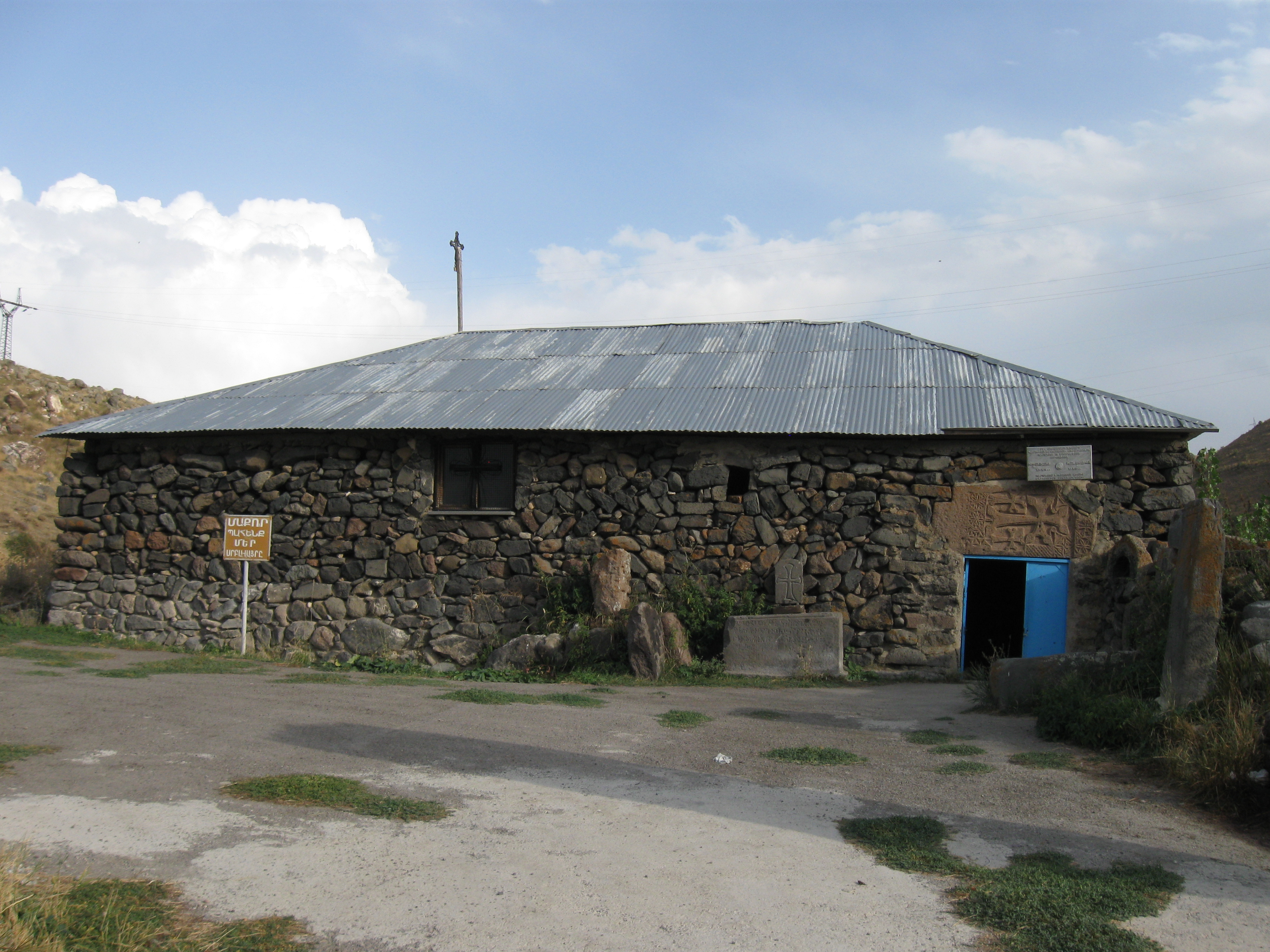
Ishkhanavank Church

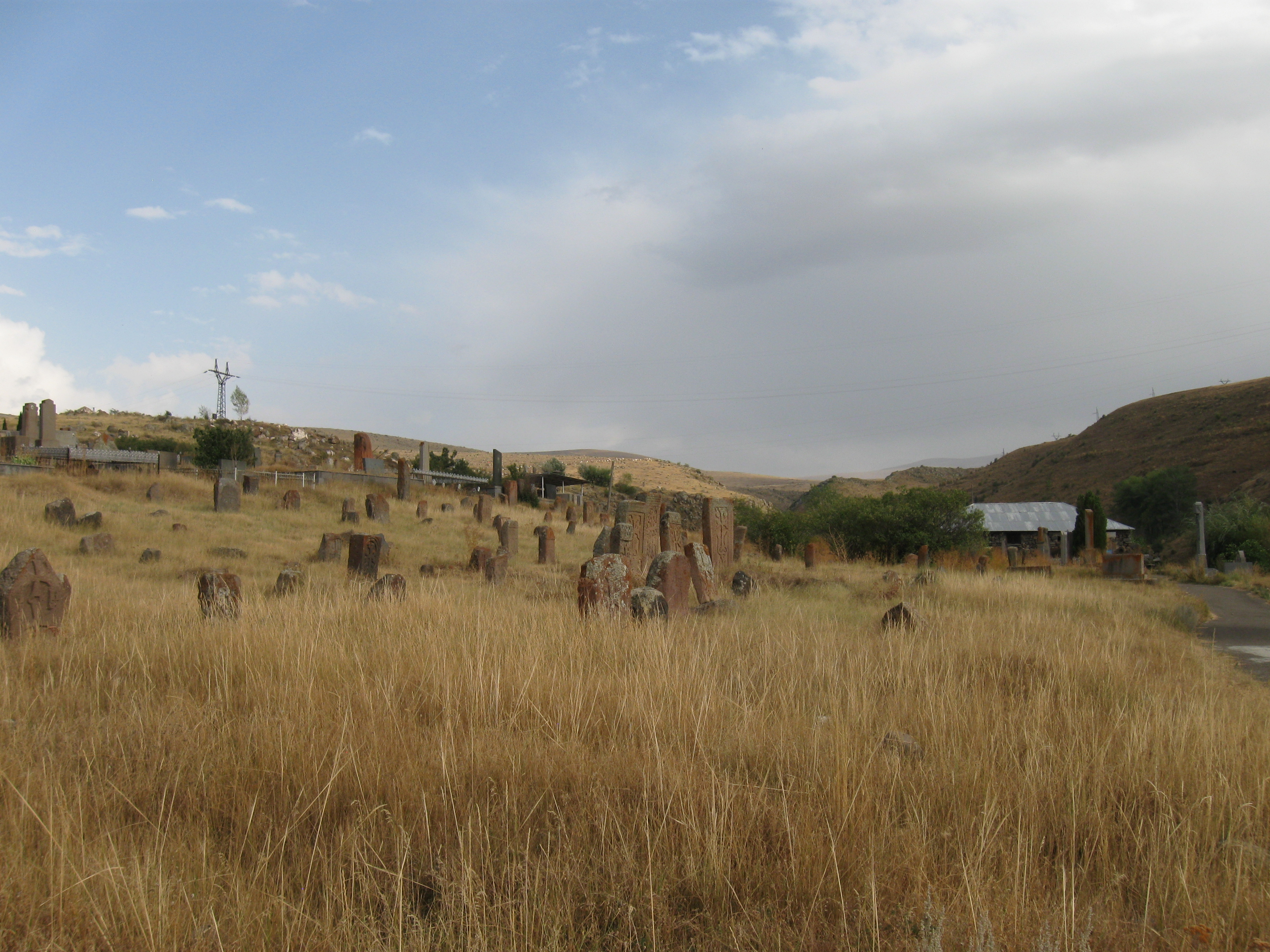
Medieval cemetery, Ishkhanavank

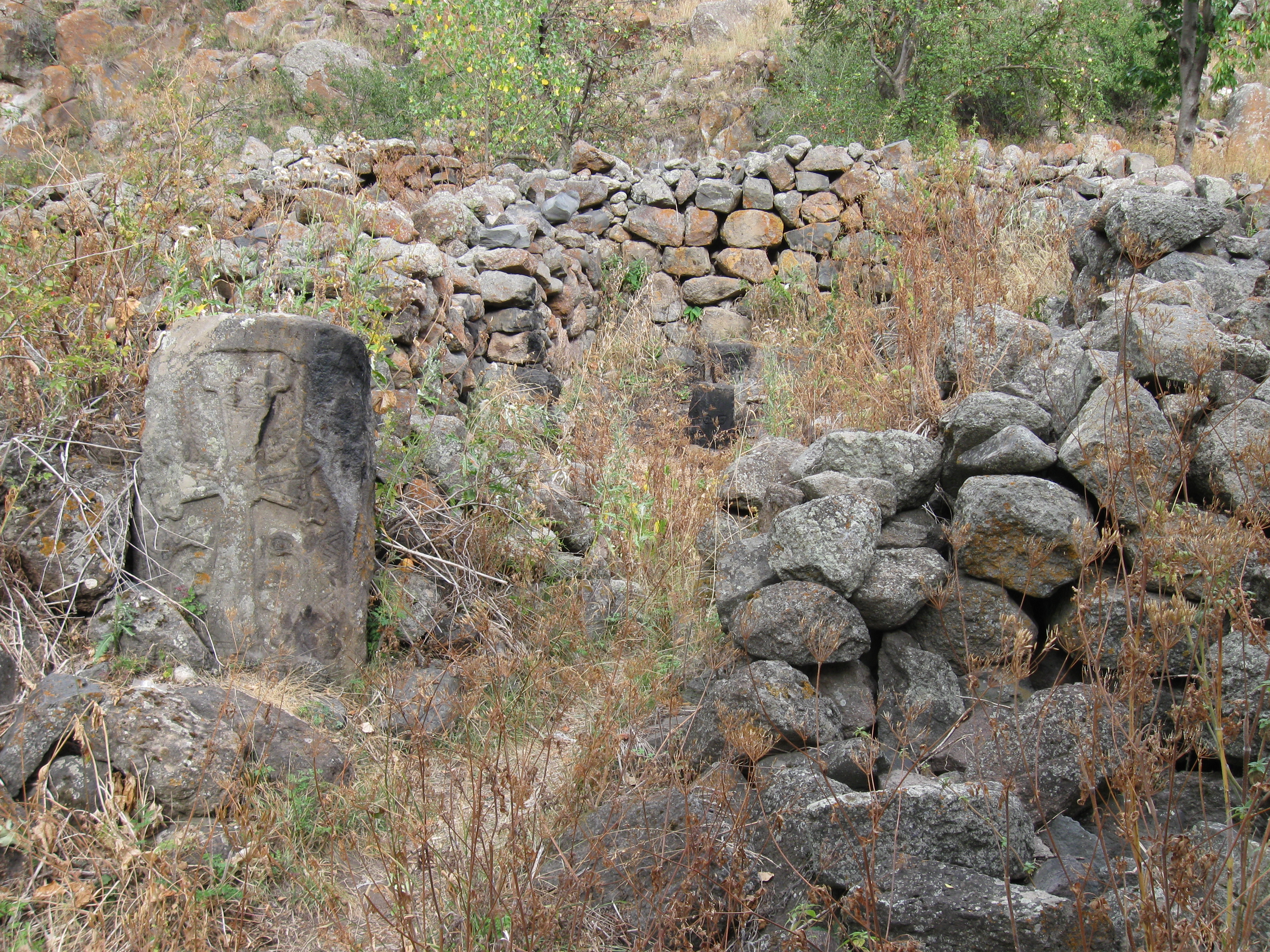
Ruins of the Tsaghkavank Church

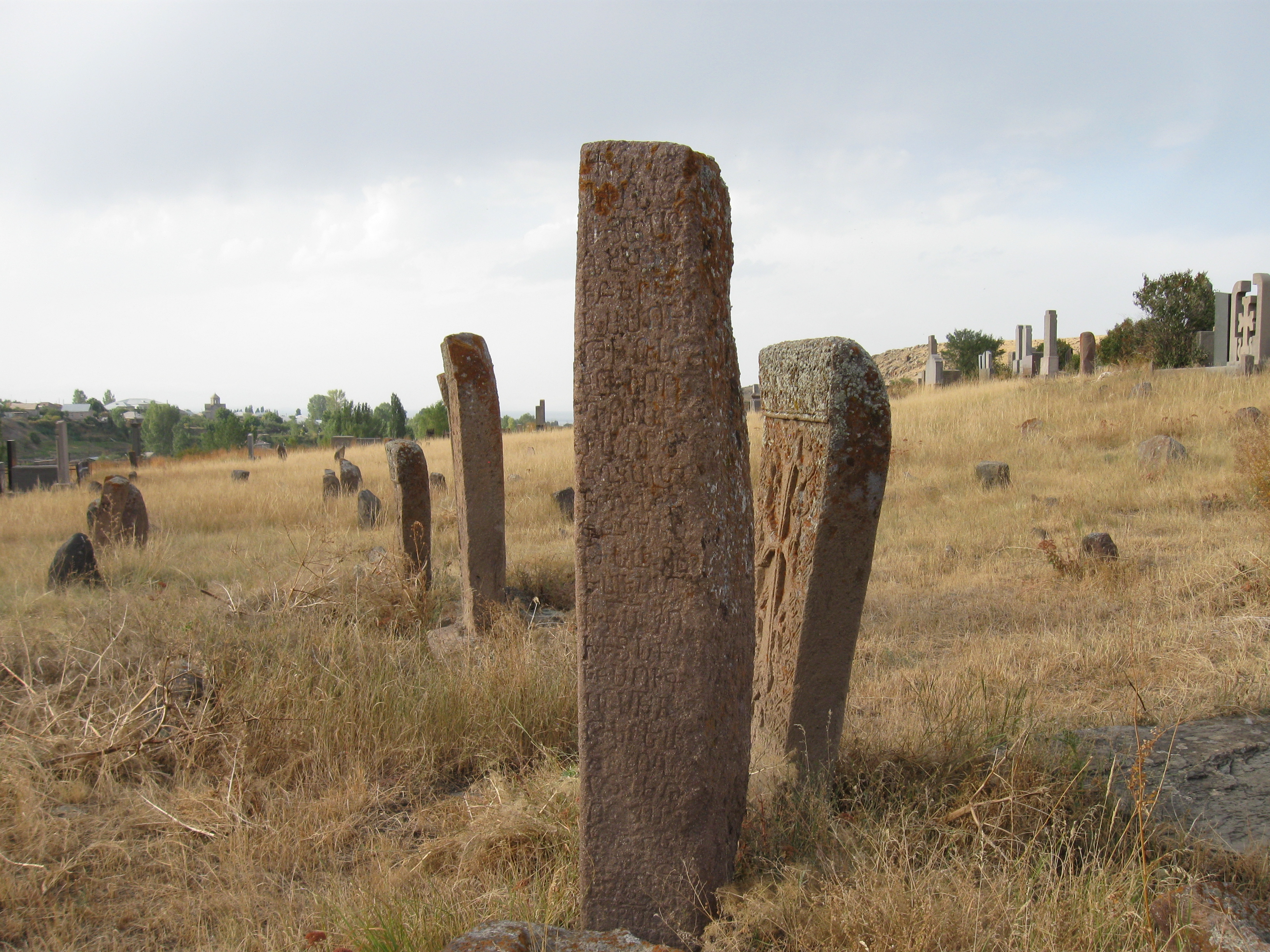
Khachkars

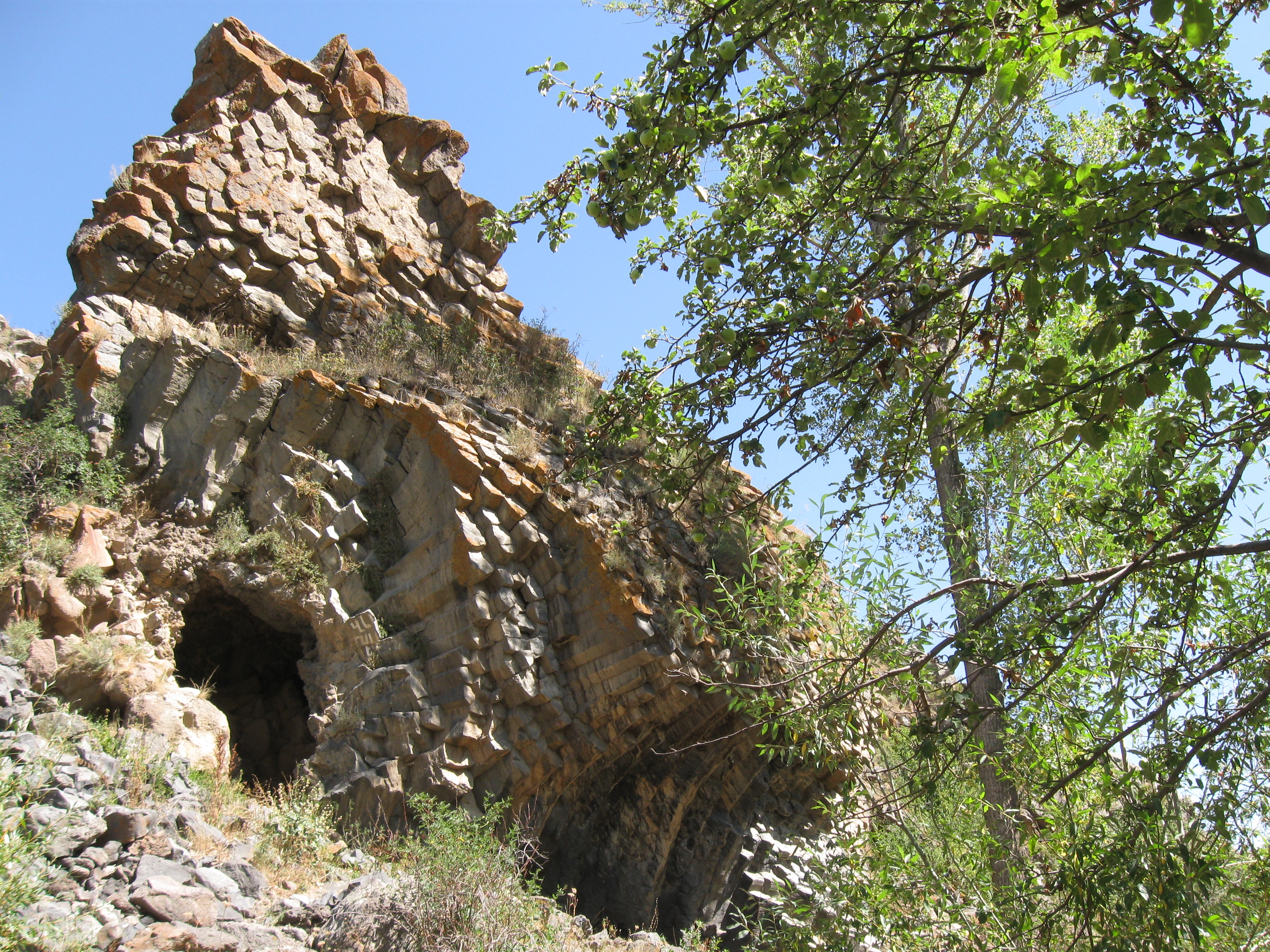
Natural monument "Stone Fortress"
