= Amalia Margaryan =

Armenian singer

Amalka
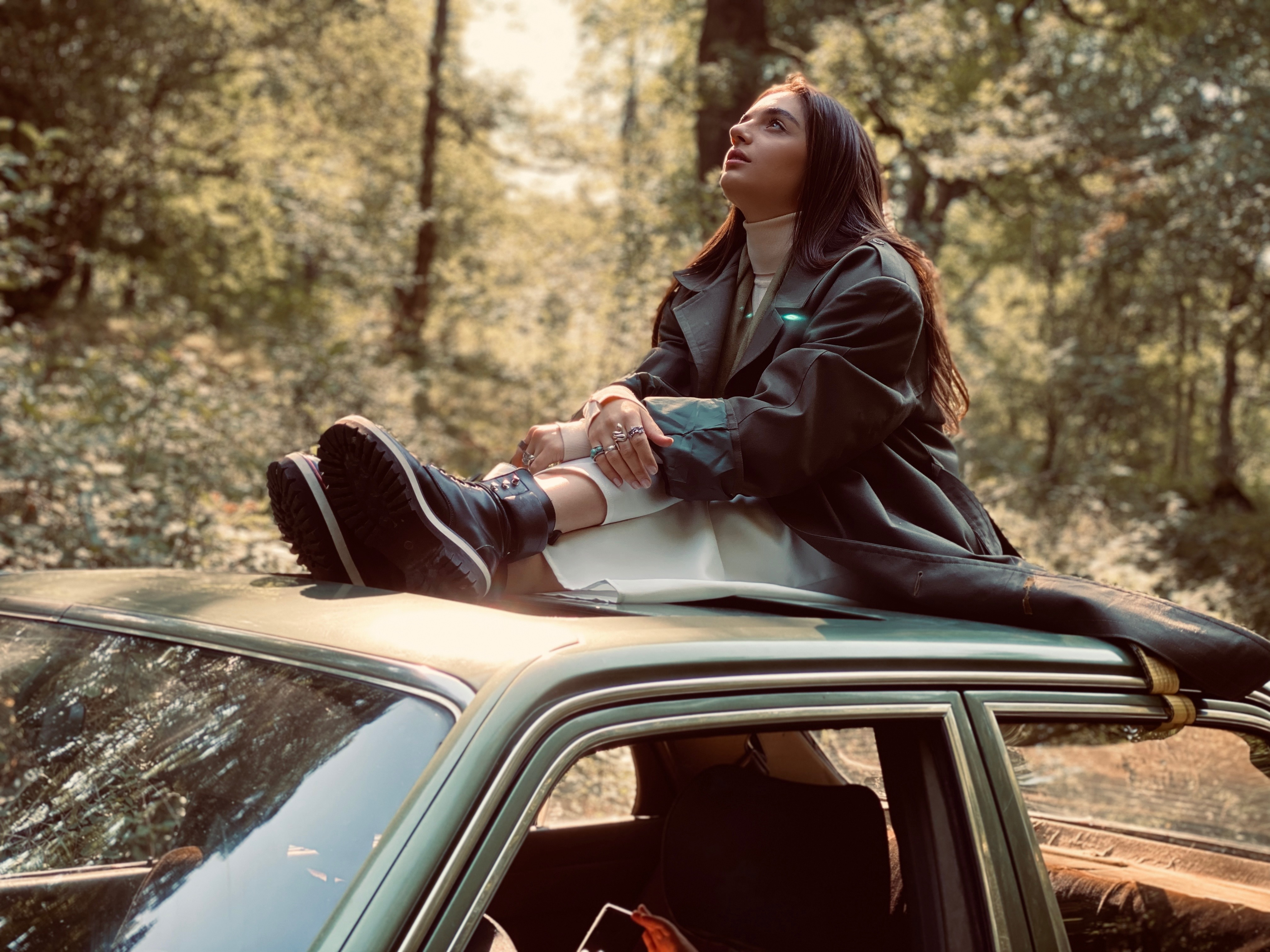

Background information
- Born: 10 February 1995 (age 31); Armenia, Yerevan
- Genres: pop, alternative
- Occupations: singer, songwriter
- Instrument: Piano
- Years active: 2015–present
- Website: https://www.amaliamargaryan.com/

Amalka (also written as Amaliya Margaryan, Amalia Margaryan) (Armenian: Ամալ'կա; born 10 February 1995) is an Armenian singer/songwriter whose musical career started in 2015 when she participated in the "X-Factor" Ukraine and "The Voice Russia" contests. She gained wider recognition with Armenian audiences when she participated in the first and second seasons of Depi Evratesil, Armenia's Eurovision Song Contest National Selection.

== Biography ==
Amalka (also written as Amaliya Margaryan, Amalia Margaryan) was born in 1995, 10 February, in Armenia, Yerevan. She graduated from Yerevan School No. 8 after Alexander Pushkin. In 2012 she entered Yerevan State University Faculty of Law and graduated in 2016. She started singing at the age of three, when she started attending the "Little Singers of Armenia" children's choir, the founder and artistic director of which is Tigran Hekekyan. She sang here for more than 12 years. During this period she entered and graduated from the Sayat-Nova Music School with a piano degree. During her student years, Amalka was convinced that she would never pursue a musical career. However, in her second year, she began attending vocal classes with Maran Karapetyan, with whom she still collaborates.

=== 2015: X-Factor Ukraine and The Voice Russia ===
In 2015, Amalka decided to take part in the Armenian auditions of the Ukrainian "X-Factor" project. A few months later, she received an unexpected phone call from the project organizers who informed her that she had been selected as a contestant. Amalka overcame the first round, singing Conchita Wurst's song "Rise Like a Phoenix". Her live performance received a lot of positive feedback, moreover, after the video was published on the official YouTube page of the "X-Factor", it gathered millions of views and became the most-watched video of that season. That performance became a turning point for the singer, bringing her the first fame in Ukraine, as well as in Armenia. A few weeks after returning from Kyiv, Amalka decided to take part in "The Voice Russia" project. Successfully qualifying the first round, she made it to the "Blind Audition". During the "Blind audition", Amalka performed Maxim Fadeev's song "Танцы на стёклах". From the four jury members, Basta turned and Amalka picked him as her coach. This performance also received a lot of feedback and gained more than 4 million views on YouTube. During "The Battle" Amalka performed together with another Armenian participant, Sergey Urumyan. Together they performed "Всё в твоих руках" song". From the duo, Basta chose Sergey and Amalka was disqualified from the project.

=== 2017: Depi Evratesil & Eurovision Song Contest 2017 ===
In 2017, the Armenian public television announced national selection of the Armenian contestant to the Eurovision Song Contest – Depi Evratesil. The artists were performing songs by different singers, and the one who overcomes all the stages should have the opportunity to represent Armenia in the Eurovision Song Contest 2017. Amalka decided to take part in it. Successfully overcoming the first stage, she appeared in singer Hayko's team and reached till the pre-election stage. Although Amalka didn't win the contest, she joined the Armenian delegation as that year's participant – Artsvik's backing vocalist.

=== 2018–present: Depi Evratesil and First Music Video ===
In 2018 Armenian Public Television again announced the national selection of the Armenian contestant to the Eurovision Song Contest – Depi Evratesil. This time participants had to present their own songs, which in case of winning should have been sung on the Eurovision stage. Amalka decided to take part one more time. This was the first time she performed her own co-authored song "Waiting for the sun" (music & lyrics by Amalka Margaryan & Vahram Yanikyan). She was warmly welcomed by the Armenian and European audience, moreover, she was one of the hot favorites of the year to win the contest. She reached the final stage. After a successful performance in Depi Evratesil, in 2018 Amalka received an offer to take part in the famous Romanian "Cerbul de Aur" competition, which was held in Brașov. During the competition, Amalka performed her co-authored song "Waiting for the Sun" as well as the song "Promit" by the famous Romanian singer Paula Seling. Amalka took the 4th place. In 2018 Amalka was amongst the Armenian jury members of the Junior Eurovision Song Contest 2018 and in 2019 as a member of the Armenian jury for the Eurovision Song Contest 2019. In May 2019, Amalka performed at the Karen Demirchyan Sports and Concert Complex at a concert dedicated to the 95th anniversary of the great chansonnier Charles Aznavour, where she shared the stage together with world-famous French singers Patrick Fiori, Hélène Ségara, and Slimane and many others. During the concert, Amalka performed Charles Aznavour's song "Cleopatra" (lyrics by Marine Gyulumyan). The song was presented to the audience for the first time and was well warmly welcomed by the audience. In the fall of 2019, Amalka released her second song, this time with a music video. The authors of the song "Another Chapter" are Amalka and Vahram Yanikyan. The video is directed by Hrant Movsisyan. The cello part of the video is performed by famous Armenian musician Artyom Manukyan. In June 2021 "Welcome to Ethernity" movie by Hrant Movsisyan was released in Armenia. The soundtrack of the movie was written by Amalka and Franklin Avetisyan. In September 2021 Amalka released her third song "Hear Me" with a music video. The authors of the song are Amalka, Vahram Yanikyan. The music video was directed by Hrant Movsisyan. This is the second collaboration with the director after "Another Chapter song". "Hear Me" is a song about the lack of humanity, the hunger of souls, and people who have no values. The music video of the song was shot in 2020, in Dilijan (Armenia) but the premiere was postponed because of the Pandemic and 44-day Artsakh war. At the end of the year, Amalka is planning to release her first musical album.

== Discography ==
=== Singles ===
Year	Title	Authors
2018	Waiting for the Sun	Amalka, Vahram Yanikyan
2019	Another Chapter	Amalka, Vahram Yanikyan
2021	In Heaven it's better (Welcome to ethernity soundtrack)	Amalka, Franklin Avetisyan
2021	Hear Me	Amalka, Vahram Yanikyan
