= Mher Mesropyan =

Armenian singer

Mger Armenia
- Born: Mher Mesropyan; 13 November 1981 (age 44); Yerevan, Armenian SSR, Soviet Union
- Origin: Moscow, Russia
- Genres: Pop
- Occupation: Singer
- Instrument: Vocals
- Years active: 1998–present
- Website: www.youtube.com/channel/UCd8_qCXJbpX2ez7L0RGYIOQ

Mher Andraniki Mesropyan (Armenian: Մհեր Անդրանիկի Մեսրոպյան), better known as his stage name Mger Armenia (also Mher Armenia) is an Armenian singer and television presenter.

In 2017, Mesropyan was awarded with the title of Honored Artist of Armenia upon the decree of Armenian president Serzh Sargsyan. He attempted to represent Armenia in the Eurovision Song Contest in 2009 and 2018, but did not succeed on either occasion, finishing 2nd and 9th respectively. He has a sister, Roza Filberg, who is an actress and a singer. In many occasions, Mesropyan has advocated for the recognition of the Artsakh Republic and has a song dedicated to the unrecognized country. From 23 April 2024 to 19 February 2025, he worked at "Kentron" TV Company, where he hosted the "Honest Conversation" program.

== Awards and nominations ==
Year	Award	Category	City	Result
2013	Armenian Music Awards	The male singer of the year	Yerevan	Won
