= Mariam Petrosyan (singer) =

Russian-Armenian singer and songwriter (born 1991)

- Born: 1991 (age 34–35); Perm, Russia
- Education: Romanos Melikyan Music College, Komitas State Conservatory of Yerevan, University of West London
- Years active: 2014–present
- Musical career
- Genres: Pop
- Instrument: Vocals

Mariam Petrosyan (Armenian: Մարիամ Պետրոսյան; born 1991) is a Russian-Armenian singer and songwriter. She is best known for competing in season 2 of Depi Evratesil 2018 with the song Fade, which qualified for the final.

In 2014, Petrosyan competed in a competition-festival I love New York and won it with her own song. In October 2016, she also entered a competition called Songwriting competition in London and reached the final. This year, Mariam along with Alpha Lighting System was the winner of 7 Notes Challenge, with her own song Here I Come, a competition organized by Serj Tankian. Tankian has commented on the song by saying "A hauntingly beautiful song that won't leave me."

== Filmography ==
As herself
Year	Title	Notes
2018	Aravot Louso (Առավոտ Լուսո)	Guest
