= Hayk Kasparov =

Armenian pop singer (born 1984)

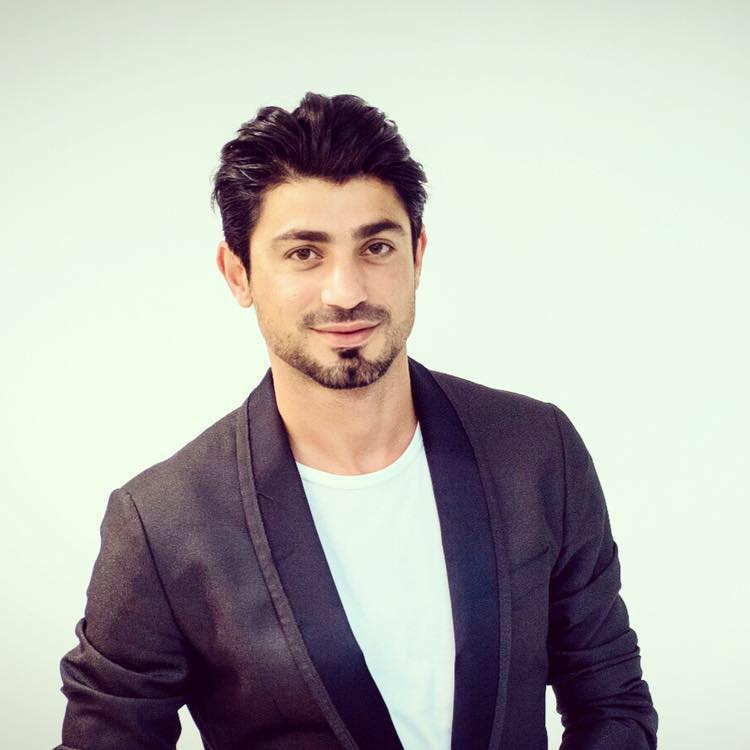

Background information
- Born: December 14, 1984 (age 41); Yerevan, Armenian SSR, Soviet Union
- Origin: Armenia
- Genres: Pop
- Occupation: Singer
- Years active: 2008-present

Hayk Vladimirovich Kasparov (Armenian: Հայկ Վլադիմիրի Կասպարով; born 14 December 1984) is an Armenian pop singer.

== Career ==
In 2008, he won Radio Van's year revelation, and in 2009, the best song at the "Golden Lyre" awards. Also in 2009, he participated in the "Two Stars" musical project of the Public Television of Armenia and left the final. He has shot about 20 videos. He performed concerts in the cities of Sydney and Tehran, as well as many cities of Russia, England, the Netherlands, Belgium and elsewhere. In 2011, he participated in the Star Wars Festival in Tajikistan where he represented Armenia. Also in 2011, the song "I'm with you" was recognized as the best song of the month at "Accord" awards. In 2012, the songs "Gta" and "Songs of Love" also became popular in the month. Since 2014, Kasparov lives in Germany, where he released the "I'm with you" album in 2015.

== Discography ==
- Like a Day (2008)
- Shame (2010)
- I'm with you (2015)

== Awards and achievements ==
Here is chronologically the awards Hayk Kasparov has received so far.

Year	Award	Category	City	Result
2008	Radio Van	Revelation of the year	Yerevan	Won
2009	Golden Lyre	The best song of the month	Yerevan	Won
2011	Commonwealth Star	CIS Interstate Award	Tajikistan	Good
2011	Accord	The best song of the month	Yerevan	Won
2012	Accord	The best song of the month	Yerevan	Won
2012	Accord	The best song of the month	Yerevan	Won
