= Arsen Grigoryan (singer, born 1982) =

Armenian actor, presenter and singer

Arsen Grigoryan Արսեն Գրիգորյան
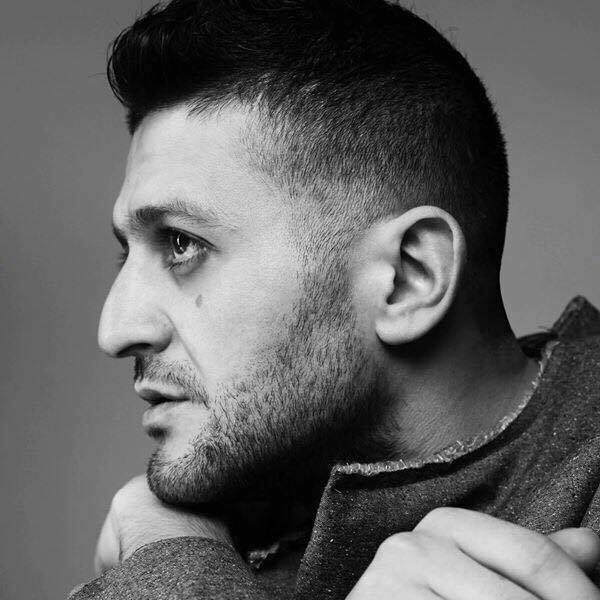
- Born: Arsen Grigoryan Արսեն Գրիգորյան; January 20, 1982 (age 43); Vardenik, Armenian SSR, Soviet Union
- Occupation(s): Actor, presenter, singer
- Years active: 1997–present

Arsen Grigoryan (Armenian: Արսեն Գրիգորյան, born January 20, 1982) is an Armenian actor, singer and presenter. He is known for his diverse roles in the cinema, theatre and in television productions. He plays the persona of Kamil (Armenian: Կամիլ), an Armenian drag queen.

== Life and career ==
His career began when Grigoryan studied at the Metro Theatre Children's Studio (1995–1997). From 1998 to 2002, he studied at the Yerevan State Institute of Theatre and Cinema, while acting at different theatres.

In 2011, with film director Lilit Movsisyan, Grigoryan made an experimental zero-budget feature-length fiction film Ashtray, which was discussed, praised and criticized after it was finished. Also in 2011 a very spontaneous shooting turned into a real success: Lilit Movsisyan and Grigoryan made an experimental short (starring Grigoryan) which was used in Ridley Scott's Life in a Day Scott project in the opening part of the film.

From 2013 Grigoryan took acting courses overseas, at Anthony Meindl's Actor Workshop, and The William Esper Studio studying the Meisner technique.

Grigoryan is also well known for his music videos, performing as a singer, director and producer. Many of his released singles were hits. At the end of 2017, Grigoryan as "Kamil" announced that she will compete in Depi Evratesil. In 2018, during her interview on Nice Evening, she said that the song is in Spanish, and it is written by Vahram Petrosyan and Arthur Abgar.

== Filmography ==
Films
Year	Title	Role	Notes
2010	Artist		
2011	Ashtray		
2011	Ala Bala Nica		
2011	Life in a Day		
2012	Open the Door		
2012	Me Too		
2012	Lost and Found in Armenia		
2013	Caucho		
2014	Release		
2015	Tangerine	Karo	
2015	Aramma		
2016	Earthquake		
2016	Three Weeks in Yerevan		
2016	Bravo, Virtuoso		

== Theatre Performances ==
Theatre
Year	Title	Theatre	Notes
1996	Island of Flies	Metro Theatre Children's Studio	
1997	6 Characters in Search of an Author	Goy Theatre	
1999	Armenia and Truth	Goy Theatre	
2000	Saga on Love – Romeo & Juliette	Goy Theatre	
2001	Daddy, Daddy, Poor Daddy	Small Theatre	
2002	The Moon and Sixpence	Goy Theatre	
2002	House on the Border	Small Theatre	
2003	Woe from Wit	Gabriel Sundukyan Theatre	
2004–2011	The Lizard	Edgar Elbakyan Drama and Comedy Theatre	
2004–2011	Baghdasar Aghbar	Edgar Elbakyan Drama and Comedy Theatre	
2004–2011	Advocate Oqsen	Edgar Elbakyan Drama and Comedy Theatre	
2006	Suddenly Last Summer	Paronyan Musical Comedy Theatre	
2009–present	No Difference With Whom	Chamber Theatre	
2009–present	Butterflies are Free	Chamber Theatre	
2009–present	Governmental Concert	Chamber Theatre	
2009–present	To Arms!	Chamber Theatre	

== Music videos ==
Music Videos
Year	Title	Director	Notes
2007	Tes	Arsen Grigoryan	
2007	5 Rope	Arsen Grigoryan	
2008	Happy Birthday	Arsen Grigoryan	
2009	Aybuben	Jor Meloyan	Featuring Sirusho
2010	Payusak	Serj Gabyan	
2017	Ckites Honkerd and Puerto Rico	Kamil	

== TV Productions ==
Television
Year	Title	Channel & Network	Notes
2001–2004	National Music Channel	Public TV Company of Armenia, New Channel TV	
2002–2005	Musical Post	Public TV Company of Armenia, New Channel TV	with Susanna Shahinyan
2003–2006	Naked Truth	Public TV Company of Armenia, New Channel TV	
2005–2011	Rubikon Interactive Program	Public TV Company of Armenia, New Channel TV, Ararat TV, Sigma TV	
2006 February 3	Emmy – First CD Presentation Solo Concert	Public TV Company of Armenia	with Avet Barseghyan, Hrach Muradyan
2007 April 1, 2011–2013	32 Teeth Club	Public TV Company of Armenia, Sigma TV, Armenia TV, 32 Production	
2009–2010	Hot 10	Public TV Company of Armenia, Sigma TV	
2011	Hello, It's Us	Public TV Company of Armenia	
2013–2014	Good Morning Armenians	Armenia TV	
2014	The Voice of Armenia	Armenia TV	with Nazeni Hovhannisyan
2015–2016	Domino	Armenia TV	Recurring (season 1), main cast (season 2), main cast (season 3)
2016	Carte Blanche (Քարտ բլանշ)	Shant TV	Recurring cast
