= Altsight =

Armenian alternative rock band

- Origin: Yerevan, Armenia
- Genres: alternative rock; pop-rock; rock
- Years active: 2015–present
- Members: Karapet Burnazyan; Dima Hovhannisyan; Sargis Burnazyan
- Past members: Alen Amiryan; Areg Petrosyan; Garik Avakian; Harutyun Saryan; Hayk Hayrumyan

Altsight (Armenian: Այլընտրանք), formerly known as Alternativ (Armenian: Ալտերնատիվ), is an Armenian alternative rock band formed in 2015 in Yerevan. They became famous after their performance at The X Factor in 2016, where they reached the finals and entered the top ten. The band was mentored by Armenian musician Garik Papoyan. In 2018, the band competed in the national final to represent Armenia in the Eurovision Song Contest 2018 with the song "Stare at Me". In 2025, they returned to compete in the national final to represent Armenia in the Eurovision Song Contest 2025 with the song "Dare to Dream".

== History ==
AlternatiV band was formed in 2015 at the Russian-Armenian University. The current band members are Sargis Burnazyan, Karapet Burnazyan, and Dima Hovhannisyan. The band's name has no connection to their music genre. At first, the band only covered famous songs, then started writing their own. In 2016, they successfully participated in X-Factor. In May 2017, they had their first solo concert at the Russian-Armenian University. The band participated in the contest 7 Notes Music Challenge by Serj Tankian.

== Members ==
Current

- Sargis Burnazyan – lead vocal (2015–present)
- Dima Hovhannisyan – drums (?–present)
- Karapet Burnazyan – rhythm guitar (2015–present)

Former

- Alen Amiryan – solo guitar (2015–2018)
- Areg Petrosyan – drums (2015–?)
- Garik Avakian – keyboards (2015–2017)
- Hayk Hayrumyan – bass guitar (2016–2017)

== Television ==
	Year	Notes
2016-2017	X-Factor Armenia (Իքս Ֆակտոր)	Finalist

== Filmography ==
	Year	Notes
2018	Depi Evratesil (Դեպի Եվրատեսիլ)	Semi-Finalist
2025	Depi Evratesil (Դեպի Եվրատեսիլ)	Finalist
