= Artsvik =

Russian-Armenian singer (born 1984)

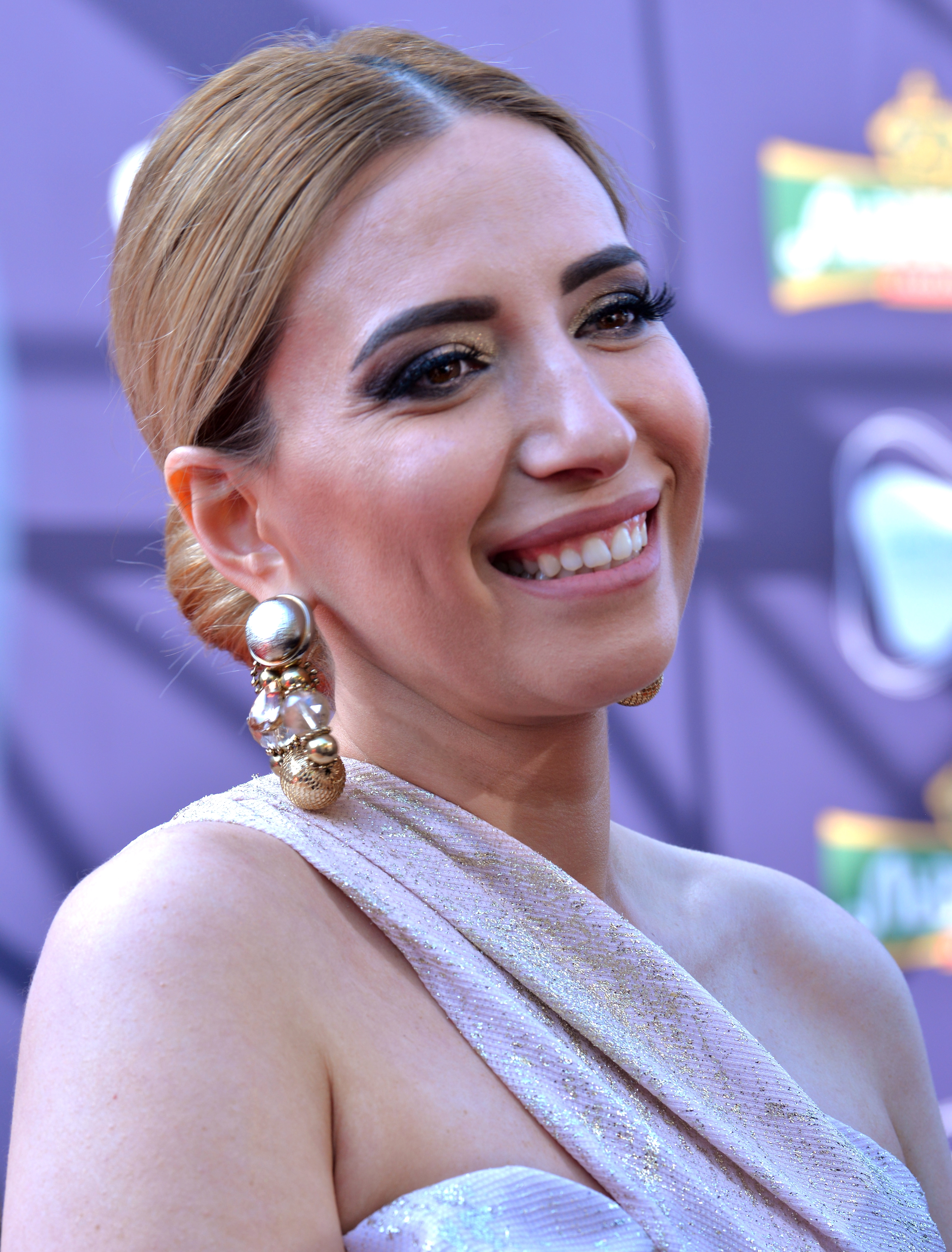
- Artsvik during Eurovision Song Contest 2017 opening ceremony

Background information
- Born: Artsvik Harutyunyan; 21 October 1984 (age 41); Kapan, Armenian SSR, USSR
- Origin: Kapan, Armenia
- Genres: Pop; R&B; soul
- Occupations: Singer; songwriter
- Years active: 2013–present

Artsvik Boriki Harutyunyan (Armenian: Արծվիկ Բորիկի Հարությունյան IPA: [ɑɾtsˈvik hɑɾutʰjunˈjɑn]; Russian: Арцвик Арутюнян; born 21 October 1984), better known as simply Artsvik, is a Russian-Armenian singer and songwriter. She represented Armenia in the Eurovision Song Contest 2017 with the song "Fly with Me" finishing in 18th place.

== Life and career ==
=== Early life ===
Artsvik was born on 21 October 1984 in Kapan. When she was five years old, the family left Armenia for Russia, settling in Moscow. After graduating from high school, Artsvik studied to become a speech therapist at Moscow State Pedagogical University.

=== 2013: Golos ===
In 2013, Artsvik became a contestant on season two of Golos, the Russian version of The Voice. Artsvik was eliminated in the battle rounds.

=== 2016–present: Eurovision Song Contest 2017 ===
In 2016, Artsvik was announced as a participant in Depi Evratesil, the Armenian national selection to find their entrant in the Eurovision Song Contest 2017. During her time on the show, she was a member of Essaï Altounian's team. She was announced the winner on 24 December 2016, and represented Armenia in the Eurovision Song Contest 2017 with the song "Fly with Me". The director of the music video on the song is Arthur Manukyan.

== Discography ==
=== Singles ===
Title	Year	Album
"Why"	2014	Non-album singles
"No Fear"	2014	Non-album singles
"I Say Yes"	2015	Non-album singles
"Fly with Me"	2017	Non-album singles
"Mna Du"	2017	Non-album singles
"Bang Bang"	2019	Non-album singles
"Сердцем к небесам"	2021	Non-album singles
"Stay" (feat. Ragda Khanieva)	2021	Non-album singles
"Снова во сне"	2021	Non-album singles

== See also ==
- Armenia in the Eurovision Song Contest
- Eurovision Song Contest 2017

Awards and achievements
Preceded by Iveta Mukuchyan with "LoveWave"	Armenia in the Eurovision Song Contest; 2017	Succeeded by Sevak Khanagyan with "Qami"
