= Inga and Anush Arshakyan =

Armenian musical duo

Inga & Anush
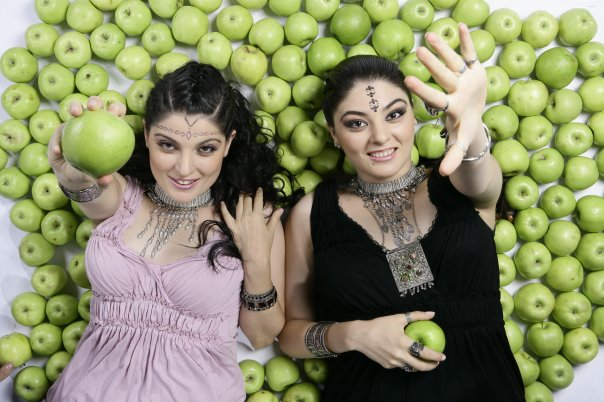

Background information
- Born: Inga Ashoti Arshakyan; Anush Ashoti Arshakyan; 18 March 1982 (age 44) (Inga); 24 December 1980 (age 45) (Anush); Yerevan, Armenian SSR, USSR
- Origin: Yerevan, Armenia
- Genres: Folk; worldbeat; folk rock
- Years active: 2000–present
- Label: SHARM Holding LLC

Inga and Anush Ashoti Arshakyan (Armenian: Ինգա և Անուշ Աշոտի Արշակյաններ) or the Arshakyan Sisters (Armenian: Արշակյան քույրեր, romanized: Arshakyan k'uryer) are an Armenian folk singing duo. The sisters represented Armenia in the Eurovision Song Contest 2009, eventually finishing in 10th place in the final.

== Early life ==
Anush was born on 24 December 1980 in Yerevan. She graduated from S. Aslamazyan music school, in piano. In 1994, she came first and was awarded the audience prize in the "Sonorous Voices" competition that took place in Omsk. In that period, she started promoting herself as a writer/composer. As soon as she graduated in 2001, she entered and graduated from A. Babajanyan music college, in piano. In 1999, she made her debut as a soloist together with Armenia State Philharmonic Orchestra and Chorus. From 2001 to 2005, she studied at Yerevan State Conservatory, and graduated in jazz-vocal.

Her sister Inga was born on 18 March 1982, in Yerevan. She also graduated from S. Aslamazyan music school and A. Babajanyan music college, as a violinist in 1997. Parallel with her studies she was working in the G. Achemyan violin ensemble. She toured with the ensemble to Armenian provinces. In 1998, Inga joined her sister and together they promoted their activities. Not only duets, but also arias, where the violin plays a great role, are present in the repertoire. In 2002 graduating in strings, she followed her sister into the Yerevan State Conservatory, jazz vocal class, graduating in 2005.

== Career ==
In 2000, Inga and Anush entered the State Song Theater of Armenia. Both of them performed national, ethnic songs and songs written by A. Grigoryan and Anush. They sang in many cities of Armenia as soloists.

In September 2002, they left for the United States for a concert tour with song theatre soloists. After the concerts at "Alex" Theatre in Los Angeles, the sisters immediately got an offer to appear on the same stage with solo concerts. The song theater left for Tehran with the same program.

In 2002, the Armenian variety song festival Golden Lyre 2002 congratulated Anush and Inga on the "Sympathy of Audience" nomination. In February 2003, the Seasons of Life concert program was prepared, the producer was A. Grigoryan. Ethnic, national as well as modern songs were included in the musical performance, as well as songs to the accompaniment of violin, guitar and piano.

In March 2003, solo concerts of Inga and Anush took place in the "Alex" Theater. At the same time their first album We and our Mountains was released. This was followed by invitations to appear on stage with the same program in New York City, Toronto, Argentina and Paris. Eventually in November, they left the theatre staff and started working on their own.

In 2004, their rendition of the folk song "Tamzara" was announced as the winner of the Golden Lyre 2004 festival. Additionally the song won the Tigran Naghdalyan award in the National Music Awards in December 2005. A video for the song was released the same year, and it was later included on their second album Tamzara, which was released in 2006.

Following the album release, they gave performances on tours in the US, Tehran, London, Paris, Russia and Germany. From 2008, Inga and Anush Arshakayan have cooperated with SHARM Holding LLC.

Inga and Anush's third studio album Heartbeat of my Land was released in November 2009. The album's single Menq Enq Mer Sarerệ, was selected as the 2009 song for the annual Armenian Telethon, under the name "Our Shushi", with the duet also performing at the televised show on 26 November 2009. On 21 May, Inga & Anush started a tour to promote their album Heartbeat of my Land. Their first show was in Yerevan, having several other appearances in Syria, Beirut and Russia.

=== Eurovision Song Contest 2009 ===
The Arshakyan Sisters were chosen by the Armenian public on 14 February 2009, to represent the country at the Eurovision Song Contest 2009 to be held in Moscow, Russia, with the song "Jan Jan".

"Our song for Eurovision is written in the genre of folk, with elements of contemporary music trends" – said Anush Arshakyan at the press conference before the trip to Moscow. The song's music was composed by Mane Akopyan, and lyrics by Avet Barseghyan (the Armenian part) and Vardan Zadoyan (the English part) arrangement has been prepared by Ara (Murzo) Torosyan. In her words, their goal is to represent Armenian folk music in a new way. "Small countries like Armenia should always take part in contests such as Eurovision, to present their culture to the world," – said the singer. "Contest success depends not only on the artists, but from our side we will try to do everything to achieve victory in Moscow," said Anush Arshakyan, adding that they would start preparations immediately.

The song won a place in the Eurovision final on 16 May, winning one of ten spots from the first semi final on 12 May. They eventually finished in 10th place with 92 points. Although it was Armenia's less successful performance in the Eurovision so far (until 2011), it gave the country a fourth successive top ten placing.

"Jan Jan" was also the first Armenian song that entered the Pmachinery Top 30. The song entered the chart on 13 June 2009 at number 26. Its highest chart position was number 3 (1 August 2009) and it remained in the chart for 16 weeks.

=== Eurovision Song Contest 2015 ===
Inga represented Armenia again in the Eurovision Song Contest 2015 as a member of the group Genealogy.

== Discography ==
=== Albums ===
- 2003: We and our Mountains
- 2006: Tamzara
- 2009: Heartbeat of my Land
- 2014: Sketches

=== Singles ===
- 2006: "Թամզարա" (Tamzara)
- 2006: "Խլպանե" (Khlpane)
- 2007: "Հարսանեկան" (Marry song)
- 2009: "Jan Jan"
- 2009: "Գութան" (Gutan)
- 2009: "Ճանապարհ" (The road)
- 2009: "You Will Not Be Alone"
- 2009: "Դոն հայ" (Don Hay)
- 2009: "Մենք ենք մեր սարերը" (We are our mountains)
- 2011: "Սեր Երևան" (Love Yerevan)
- 2011: "Իմ անունը Հայաստան է" (My name is Armenia)
- 2012: "Հայ հայ" (Hay Hay [Hye hye])

=== Videography ===
- 2006: Inga & Anush.Live concert
- 2011: The road

== Awards ==
Year	Award	Category	City	Result
2015	Armenian Pulse Music Awards	Best Video	Yerevan	Won
2006	Armenian Music Awards	Best Pop Retro Album	Hollywood, CA, USA	Won
2004	Armenian Music Awards	Best Female Pop Retro Album	Hollywood, CA, USA	Won

== See also ==
- Armenia in the Eurovision Song Contest 2009

Awards and achievements
Preceded by Sirusho with "Qélé, Qélé"	Armenia in the Eurovision Song Contest; 2009	Succeeded by Eva Rivas with "Apricot Stone"
