= Italy in the Eurovision Song Contest 2017 =

- Eurovision Song Contest 2017
- Participating broadcaster: Radiotelevisione italiana (RAI)
- Country: Italy
- Selection process: Sanremo Music Festival 2017
- Selection date: 11 February 2017

Competing entry
- Song: "Occidentali's Karma"
- Artist: Francesco Gabbani
- Songwriters: Francesco Gabbani; Filippo Gabbani; Luca Chiaravalli; Fabio Ilacqua

Placement
- Final result: 6th, 334 points

Participation chronology

Italy was represented at the Eurovision Song Contest 2017 with the song "Occidentali's Karma", written by Francesco Gabbani, Filippo Gabbani, Luca Chiaravalli, and Fabio Ilacqua, and performed by Gabbani himself. The Italian participating broadcaster, Radiotelevisione italiana (RAI), announced in October 2016 that the winning performer(s) of the Big Artists section of the Sanremo Music Festival 2017 would earn the right to represent the country at the contest. The selected performer would also be given the right to choose their own song to compete with at Eurovision. In February 2017, Francesco Gabbani emerged as the winner of Sanremo with the song "Occidentali's Karma". The artist accepted the invitation to represent Italy at Eurovision and decided that "Occidentali's Karma" would be his contest entry.

== Background ==
Prior to the 2017 contest, Radiotelevisione italiana (RAI) had participated in the Eurovision Song Contest representing Italy forty-two times since its first entry during the inaugural contest in 1956. Since then, it has won the contest on two occasions: in 1964 with the song "Non ho l'età" performed by Gigliola Cinquetti and in 1990 with the song "Insieme: 1992" performed by Toto Cutugno. RAI withdrawn from the Eurovision Song Contest a number of times with its most recent absence spanning from 1998 until 2010. Its return in 2011 with the song "Madness of Love", performed by Raphael Gualazzi, placed second—their highest result, to this point, since their victory in 1990. In 2016, "No Degree of Separation" performed by Francesca Michielin placed sixteenth with 124 points.

As part of its duties as participating broadcaster, RAI organises the selection of its entry in the Eurovision Song Contest and broadcasts the event in the country. The broadcaster confirmed its participation in the 2017 contest on 16 September 2016. Between 2011 and 2013, RAI used the Sanremo Music Festival as an artist selection pool where a special committee would select one of the competing artist, independent of the results in the competition, as the Eurovision entrant. The selected entrant was then responsible for selecting the song they would compete with. For 2014, RAI forwent using the Sanremo Music Festival artist lineup and internally selected their entry. Since 2015, the winning artist of the Sanremo Music Festival is rewarded with the opportunity to represent Italy at the Eurovision Song Contest, although in 2016 the winner declined and the broadcaster appointed the runner-up as the Italian entrant.

== Before Eurovision ==
=== Sanremo Music Festival 2017 ===
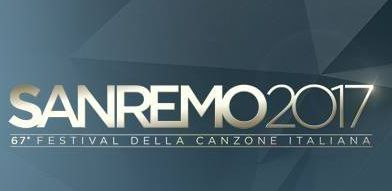
Sanremo 2017 logo

On 20 October 2016, the Italian broadcaster RAI confirmed its continued tradition of selecting its Eurovision entry from the Sanremo Music Festival. For the 2017 Eurovision Song Contest, this selection would be made from the artists competing in the Big Artists category of the 67th Sanremo. As outlined, the festival's rules gave the winner of this category the first right of refusal to represent Italy at Eurovision. However, if the winner declined, RAI reserved the right to choose another participant based on their own criteria. The Sanremo Music Festival 2017, hosted by Carlo Conti, took place from 7 to 11 February in Sanremo, Italy at the Teatro Ariston. Voting during the festival included a combination of public televoting (40%), press jury voting, a poll of 300 music fans, and an expert jury voting (30%), all contributing to the selection of the winner on the final day

The Big Artists category featured twenty-two artists, including Al Bano, who represented Italy in 1976 and 1985, performing duets with Romina Power. Emma Marrone, who represented Italy in 2014 was a songwriter for performer Elodie. Those performing in the Big Artists category were:

| Artist | Song | Songwriter(s) |
|---|---|---|
| Al Bano | "Di rose e di spine" | Maurizio Fabrizio, Katia Astarita, Albano Carrisi |
| Alessio Bernabei | "Nel mezzo di un applauso" | Roberto Casalino, Dario Faini, Vanni Casagrande |
| Bianca Atzei | "Ora esisti solo tu" | Francesco Silvestre |
| Chiara | "Nessun posto è casa mia" | Niccolò Verrienti, Carlo Verrienti |
| Clementino | "Ragazzi fuori" | Clemente Macarro, Fabio Bartolo Rizzo, Pablo Miguel Lombroni Capalbo, Stefano Tognini |
| Elodie | "Tutta colpa mia" | Emma Marrone, Oscar Angiuli, Gianni Pollex, Francesco Cianciola |
| Ermal Meta | "Vietato morire" | Ermal Meta |
| Fabrizio Moro | "Portami via" | Fabrizio Mobrici, Roberto Cardelli |
| Fiorella Mannoia | "Che sia benedetta" | Erika Mineo, Salvatore Mineo |
| Francesco Gabbani | "Occidentali's Karma" | Francesco Gabbani, Filippo Gabbani, Fabio Ilacqua, Luca Chiaravalli |
| Gigi D'Alessio | "La prima stella" | Luigi D'Alessio |
| Giusy Ferreri | "Fa talmente male" | Paolo Catalano, Fabio Clemente, Roberto Casalino, Alessandro Merli |
| Lodovica Comello | "Il cielo non mi basta" | Federica Abbate, Antonio Di Martino, Dario Faini, Fabrizio Ferraguzzo |
| Marco Masini | "Spostato di un secondo" | Marco Masini, Diego Calvetti, Sergio Vallarino |
| Michele Bravi | "Il diario degli errori" | Federica Abbate, Giuseppe Anastasi, Cheope |
| Michele Zarrillo | "Mani nelle mani" | Michele Zarrillo, Giampiero Artegiani |
| Nesli feat. Alice Paba | "Do retta a te" | Francesco Tarducci, Orazio Grillo |
| Paola Turci | "Fatti bella per te" | Paola Turci, Giulia Anania, Luca Chiaravalli, Davide Simonetta |
| Raige feat. Giulia Luzi | "Togliamoci la voglia" | Alex Andrea Vella, Antonio Iammarino, Luca Chiaravalli, Sergio Vallarino |
| Ron | "L'ottava meraviglia" | Rosalino Cellamare, Mattia Del Forno, Francesco Caprara, Emiliano Mangia |
| Samuel Umberto Romano | "Vedrai" | Samuel Umberto Romano, Riccardo Onori, Christian Rigano |
| Sergio Sylvestre | "Con te" | Giorgia Todrani, Stefano Maiuolo, Sergio Sylvestre |

==== Final ====
On the final night of the Sanremo Music Festival 2017, Francesco Gabbani emerged as the winner with his performance of "Occidentali's Karma". Subsequently, during the closing press conference of the festival on 11 February 2017, Italy's national broadcaster RAI, officially confirmed Gabbani's acceptance to represent Italy at the Eurovision Song Contest 2017. Further solidifying this decision, RAI took to Twitter to announce that Gabbani would bring "Occidentali's Karma", to the Eurovision stage in Kyiv.

First Round – 11 February 2017
| R/O | Artist | Song | Jury (30%) | Demoscopic Poll (30%) | Televote (40%) | Total | Place |
|---|---|---|---|---|---|---|---|
| 1 | Elodie | "Tutta colpa mia" | 3.13% | 6.78% | 5.99% | 5.37% | 8 |
| 2 | Michele Zarrillo | "Mani nelle mani" | 3.13% | 3.80% | 3.49% | 3.48% | 11 |
| 3 | Sergio Sylvestre | "Con te" | 3.13% | 7.30% | 8.10% | 6.37% | 6 |
| 4 | Fiorella Mannoia | "Che sia benedetta" | 15.00% | 15.05% | 12.73% | 14.11% | 1 |
| 5 | Fabrizio Moro | "Portami via" | 4.38% | 5.98% | 7.94% | 6.28% | 7 |
| 6 | Alessio Bernabei | "Nel mezzo di un applauso" | 3.75% | 2.02% | 3.21% | 3.01% | 15 |
| 7 | Marco Masini | "Spostato di un secondo" | 2.50% | 4.15% | 3.63% | 3.45% | 13 |
| 8 | Paola Turci | "Fatti bella per te" | 13.75% | 9.80% | 4.15% | 8.72% | 5 |
| 9 | Bianca Atzei | "Ora esisti solo tu" | 1.88% | 6.02% | 7.26% | 5.27% | 9 |
| 10 | Francesco Gabbani | "Occidentali's Karma" | 9.38% | 11.88% | 14.37% | 12.13% | 2 |
| 11 | Chiara | "Nessun posto è casa mia" | 3.75% | 3.68% | 2.21% | 3.11% | 14 |
| 12 | Clementino | "Ragazzi fuori" | 3.13% | 2.55% | 2.69% | 2.78% | 16 |
| 13 | Ermal Meta | "Vietato morire" | 13.75% | 7.72% | 7.63% | 9.49% | 3 |
| 14 | Lodovica Comello | "Il cielo non mi basta" | 3.13% | 3.18% | 3.89% | 3.45% | 12 |
| 15 | Samuel Umberto Romano | "Vedrai" | 5.63% | 5.42% | 2.11% | 4.16% | 10 |
| 16 | Michele Bravi | "Il diaro degli errori" | 10.63% | 4.67% | 10.59% | 8.82% | 4 |

Second Round – 11 February 2017
| R/O | Artist | Song | Jury (30%) | Demoscopic Poll (30%) | Televote (40%) | Total | Place |
|---|---|---|---|---|---|---|---|
| 1 | Fiorella Mannoia | "Che sia benedetta" | 27.08% | 37.89% | 33.21% | 32.78% | 2 |
| 2 | Ermal Meta | "Vietato morire" | 43.75% | 28.61% | 23.10% | 30.95% | 3 |
| 3 | Francesco Gabbani | "Occidentali's Karma" | 29.17% | 33.50% | 43.69% | 36.27% | 1 |

== At Eurovision ==
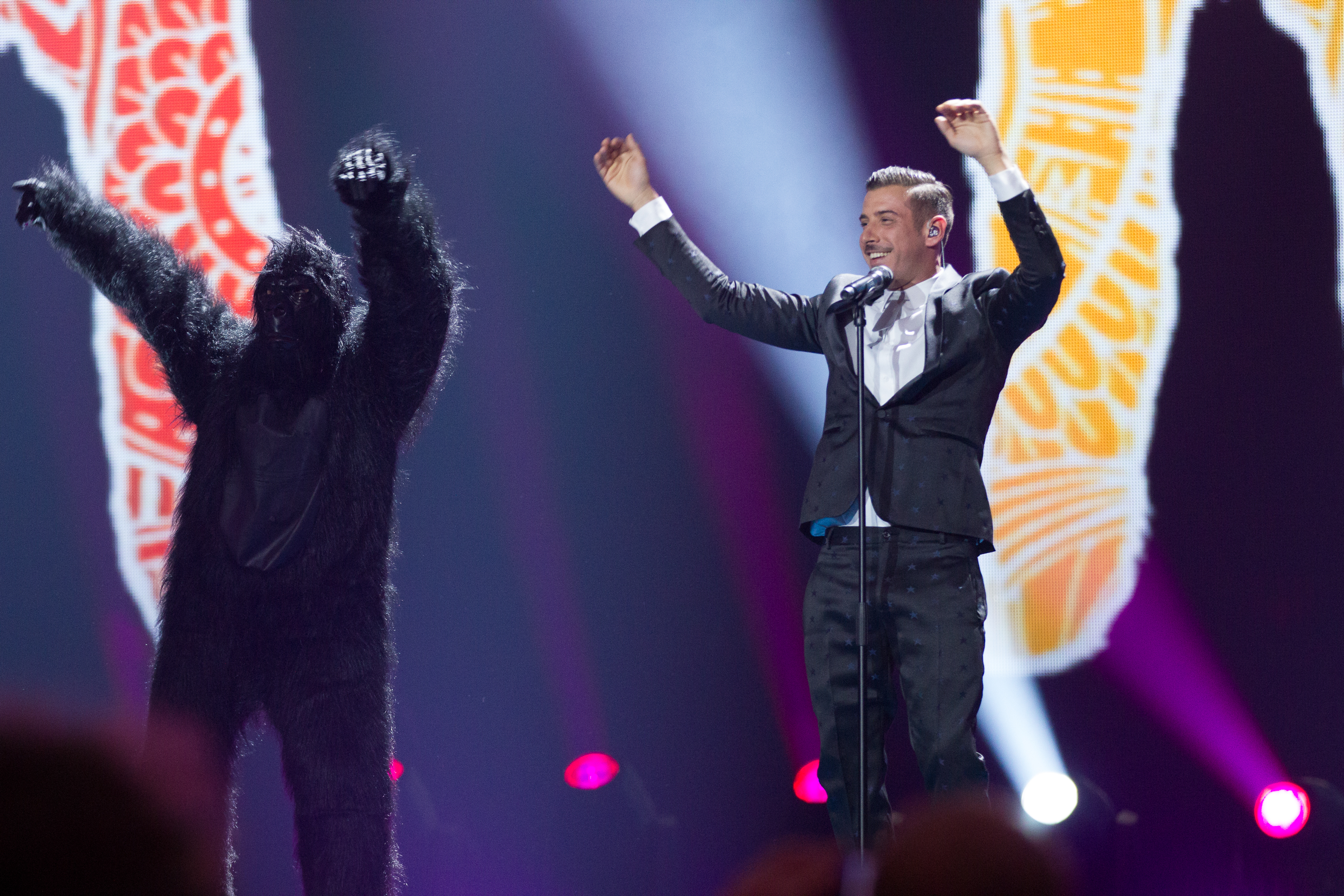
Francesco Gabbani Eurovision 2017

The Eurovision Song Contest 2017 was held at the International Exhibition Centre in Kyiv, Ukraine, featuring two semi-finals on 9 and 11 May, followed by the grand final on 13 May 2017. Eurovision rules stipulate that all participating countries, except the host nation and the "Big Five" (France, Germany, Italy, Spain, and the United Kingdom), must qualify from one of the semi-finals to enter the final. The top ten performers from each semi-final are chosen to compete in the final. As a "Big Five" member, Italy automatically qualified for the final, bypassing the semi-final rounds. However, Italy was still obligated to broadcast and vote in the first semi-final.

To organize the voting process and minimize geopolitical voting biases, the European Broadcasting Union (EBU) divided the competing countries into six different pots. These pots were determined based on historical voting patterns, grouping countries with similar voting records together. This system aims to ensure a fair and diverse distribution of voting preferences among the participating nations.

=== Voting ===
==== Points awarded to Italy ====
Points awarded to Italy (Final)
| Score | Televote | Jury |
|---|---|---|
| 12 points | Albania; Malta | Albania; Malta |
| 10 points | Montenegro; San Marino; Slovenia; Switzerland | Cyprus; France; Spain |
| 8 points | Cyprus; Finland; Israel; Macedonia; Spain | Lithuania; Montenegro; Serbia |
| 7 points | Croatia; Greece; Iceland | Finland; Norway |
| 6 points | Austria; Azerbaijan; Romania; Serbia | Austria; Sweden |
| 5 points | Belgium; Estonia; France; Georgia; Lithuania | Iceland |
| 4 points | Armenia; Germany; Hungary; Moldova; Portugal | Greece |
| 3 points | Latvia | San Marino |
| 2 points | Australia; Netherlands; Norway; United Kingdom | Armenia; Georgia; Israel; Slovenia; Switzerland |
| 1 point | Czech Republic; Ireland; Sweden | |

==== Points awarded by Italy ====
Points awarded by Italy (Semi-final 1)
| Score | Televote | Jury |
|---|---|---|
| 12 points | Moldova | Azerbaijan |
| 10 points | Portugal | Sweden |
| 8 points | Poland | Albania |
| 7 points | Albania | Moldova |
| 6 points | Belgium | Armenia |
| 5 points | Montenegro | Belgium |
| 4 points | Greece | Portugal |
| 3 points | Cyprus | Cyprus |
| 2 points | Georgia | Georgia |
| 1 point | Sweden | Australia |

Points awarded by Italy (Final)
| Score | Televote | Jury |
|---|---|---|
| 12 points | Moldova | Azerbaijan |
| 10 points | Romania | Sweden |
| 8 points | Bulgaria | Moldova |
| 7 points | Ukraine | Belgium |
| 6 points | Croatia | France |
| 5 points | Portugal | Portugal |
| 4 points | Hungary | Armenia |
| 3 points | Poland | Norway |
| 2 points | Belgium | Bulgaria |
| 1 point | France | Austria |

==== Detailed voting results ====
The following members comprised the Italian jury:

- Antonello Carozza (jury chairperson) – musician, singer, art director
- Fabrizio Brocchieri – producer, label manager, tour manager, writer
- Giusy Cascio – journalist
- Chiara di Giambattista – television author and screenwriter
- Antonio Allegra – marketing director

Detailed voting results from Italy (Semi-final 1)
| R/O | Country | Jury | | | | | | | Televote | | |
| R/O | Country | F. Brocchieri | A. Carozza | G. Cascio | C. di Giambattista | A. Allegra | Rank | Points | Percentage | Rank | Points |
|---|---|---|---|---|---|---|---|---|---|---|---|
| 01 | Sweden | 2 | 5 | 6 | 1 | 3 | 2 | 10 | 3.44% | 10 | 1 |
| 02 | Georgia | 14 | 8 | 15 | 5 | 7 | 9 | 2 | 3.69% | 9 | 2 |
| 03 | Australia | 6 | 11 | 14 | 9 | 13 | 10 | 1 | 2.20% | 15 | |
| 04 | Albania | 9 | 1 | 5 | 4 | 2 | 3 | 8 | 5.69% | 4 | 7 |
| 05 | Belgium | 3 | 13 | 4 | 2 | 5 | 6 | 5 | 5.16% | 5 | 6 |
| 06 | Montenegro | 10 | 18 | 7 | 15 | 14 | 14 | | 5.06% | 6 | 5 |
| 07 | Finland | 11 | 12 | 13 | 14 | 12 | 12 | | 3.04% | 11 | |
| 08 | Azerbaijan | 4 | 2 | 3 | 3 | 1 | 1 | 12 | 1.73% | 17 | |
| 09 | Portugal | 1 | 7 | 8 | 7 | 9 | 7 | 4 | 9.60% | 2 | 10 |
| 10 | Greece | 17 | 15 | 9 | 12 | 8 | 11 | | 4.63% | 7 | 4 |
| 11 | Poland | 16 | 9 | 12 | 11 | 15 | 13 | | 8.08% | 3 | 8 |
| 12 | Moldova | 8 | 3 | 2 | 6 | 6 | 4 | 7 | 31.69% | 1 | 12 |
| 13 | Iceland | 15 | 16 | 11 | 16 | 11 | 16 | | 2.82% | 13 | |
| 14 | Czech Republic | 12 | 10 | 16 | 13 | 18 | 15 | | 1.48% | 18 | |
| 15 | Cyprus | 7 | 4 | 10 | 8 | 10 | 8 | 3 | 4.32% | 8 | 3 |
| 16 | Armenia | 5 | 6 | 1 | 10 | 4 | 5 | 6 | 2.95% | 12 | |
| 17 | Slovenia | 18 | 14 | 17 | 18 | 16 | 18 | | 2.24% | 14 | |
| 18 | Latvia | 13 | 17 | 18 | 17 | 17 | 17 | | 2.18% | 16 | |

Detailed voting results from Italy (Final)
| R/O | Country | Jury | | | | | | | Televote | | |
| R/O | Country | F. Brocchieri | A. Carozza | G. Cascio | C. di Giambattista | A. Allegra | Rank | Points | Percentage | Rank | Points |
|---|---|---|---|---|---|---|---|---|---|---|---|
| 01 | Israel | 14 | 21 | 11 | 13 | 19 | 15 | | 2.46% | 13 | |
| 02 | Poland | 19 | 18 | 15 | 24 | 25 | 21 | | 3.07% | 8 | 3 |
| 03 | Belarus | 21 | 17 | 21 | 18 | 16 | 20 | | 2.68% | 11 | |
| 04 | Austria | 7 | 12 | 7 | 12 | 10 | 10 | 1 | 2.21% | 15 | |
| 05 | Armenia | 9 | 13 | 4 | 11 | 3 | 7 | 4 | 1.46% | 19 | |
| 06 | Netherlands | 23 | 14 | 25 | 8 | 14 | 17 | | 1.49% | 18 | |
| 07 | Moldova | 5 | 3 | 3 | 4 | 5 | 3 | 8 | 19.13% | 1 | 12 |
| 08 | Hungary | 15 | 10 | 17 | 14 | 9 | 12 | | 3.42% | 7 | 4 |
| 09 | Italy | | | | | | | | | | |
| 10 | Denmark | 25 | 23 | 23 | 25 | 23 | 25 | | 0.80% | 24 | |
| 11 | Portugal | 1 | 9 | 8 | 7 | 12 | 6 | 5 | 5.07% | 6 | 5 |
| 12 | Azerbaijan | 4 | 2 | 1 | 3 | 1 | 1 | 12 | 1.28% | 20 | |
| 13 | Croatia | 24 | 24 | 19 | 22 | 15 | 22 | | 5.99% | 5 | 6 |
| 14 | Australia | 16 | 7 | 16 | 16 | 21 | 14 | | 0.91% | 22 | |
| 15 | Greece | 22 | 19 | 22 | 23 | 20 | 23 | | 2.45% | 14 | |
| 16 | Spain | 20 | 25 | 20 | 17 | 24 | 24 | | 0.78% | 25 | |
| 17 | Norway | 17 | 6 | 6 | 6 | 7 | 8 | 3 | 1.81% | 17 | |
| 18 | United Kingdom | 13 | 20 | 18 | 19 | 18 | 19 | | 1.11% | 21 | |
| 19 | Cyprus | 11 | 15 | 12 | 10 | 13 | 11 | | 1.84% | 16 | |
| 20 | Romania | 12 | 16 | 24 | 15 | 8 | 13 | | 16.37% | 2 | 10 |
| 21 | Germany | 8 | 22 | 14 | 20 | 22 | 18 | | 0.89% | 23 | |
| 22 | Ukraine | 18 | 11 | 13 | 21 | 17 | 16 | | 7.32% | 4 | 7 |
| 23 | Belgium | 3 | 5 | 5 | 1 | 6 | 4 | 7 | 2.99% | 9 | 2 |
| 24 | Sweden | 2 | 4 | 2 | 5 | 4 | 2 | 10 | 2.56% | 12 | |
| 25 | Bulgaria | 10 | 8 | 9 | 9 | 11 | 9 | 2 | 8.98% | 3 | 8 |
| 26 | France | 6 | 1 | 10 | 2 | 2 | 5 | 6 | 2.93% | 10 | 1 |
