= Netherlands in the Eurovision Song Contest 2017 =

- Eurovision Song Contest 2017
- Participating broadcaster: AVROTROS
- Country: Netherlands
- Selection process: Internal selection
- Announcement date: Artist: 29 October 2016; Song: 3 March 2017

Competing entry
- Song: "Lights and Shadows"
- Artist: Ogene
- Songwriters: Rory de Kievit; Rick Vol

Placement
- Semi-final result: Qualified (4th, 200 points)
- Final result: 11th, 150 points

Participation chronology

The Netherlands was represented at the Eurovision Song Contest 2017 with the song "Lights and Shadows", written by Rory de Kievit and Rick Vol, and performed by the group Ogene. The Dutch participating broadcaster, AVROTROS, internally selected its entry for the contest. Ogene's appointment as the Dutch representative was announced on 29 October 2016, while the song, "Lights and Shadows", was presented to the public on 3 March 2017.

The Netherlands was drawn to compete in the second semi-final of the Eurovision Song Contest which took place on 11 May 2017. Performing during the show in position 6, "Lights and Shadows" was announced among the top 10 entries of the second semi-final and therefore qualified to compete in the final on 13 May. It was later revealed that the Netherlands placed fourth out of the 18 participating countries in the semi-final with 200 points. In the final, the Netherlands placed eleventh out of the 26 participating countries, scoring 150 points.

== Background ==
Prior to the 2017 contest, AVROTROS and its predecessor national broadcasters have participated in the Eurovision Song Contest representing the Netherlands fifty-seven times since NTS début in 1956. They have won the contest four times: in 1957 with the song "Net als toen" performed by Corry Brokken; in 1959 with the song "'n Beetje" performed by Teddy Scholten; in 1969 as one of four countries to tie for first place with "De troubadour" performed by Lenny Kuhr; and finally in 1975 with "Ding-a-dong" performed by the group Teach-In. Following the introduction of semi-finals for the 2004 contest, the Netherlands had featured in only four finals. The Dutch least successful result has been last place, which they have achieved on five occasions, most recently in the second semi-final of the 2011 contest. The Netherlands has also received nul points on two occasions; in 1962 and 1963.

As part of its duties as participating broadcaster, AVROTROS organises the selection of its entry in the Eurovision Song Contest and broadcasts the event in the country.The Dutch broadcaster has used various methods to select its entry in the past, such as the Nationaal Songfestival, a live televised national final to choose the performer, song or both to compete at Eurovision. However, internal selections have also been held on occasion. Since 2013, the Dutch broadcaster has internally selected its entry for the contest. In 2013, the internal selection of "Birds" by Anouk managed to take the country to the final for the first time in eight years and placed ninth overall. In 2014, the internal selection of "Calm After the Storm" by the Common Linnets qualified the nation to the final once again and placed second, making it the most successful Dutch result in the contest since their victory in 1975. For 2017, AVROTROS opted to continue selecting its entry through an internal selection.

== Before Eurovision ==
=== Internal selection ===
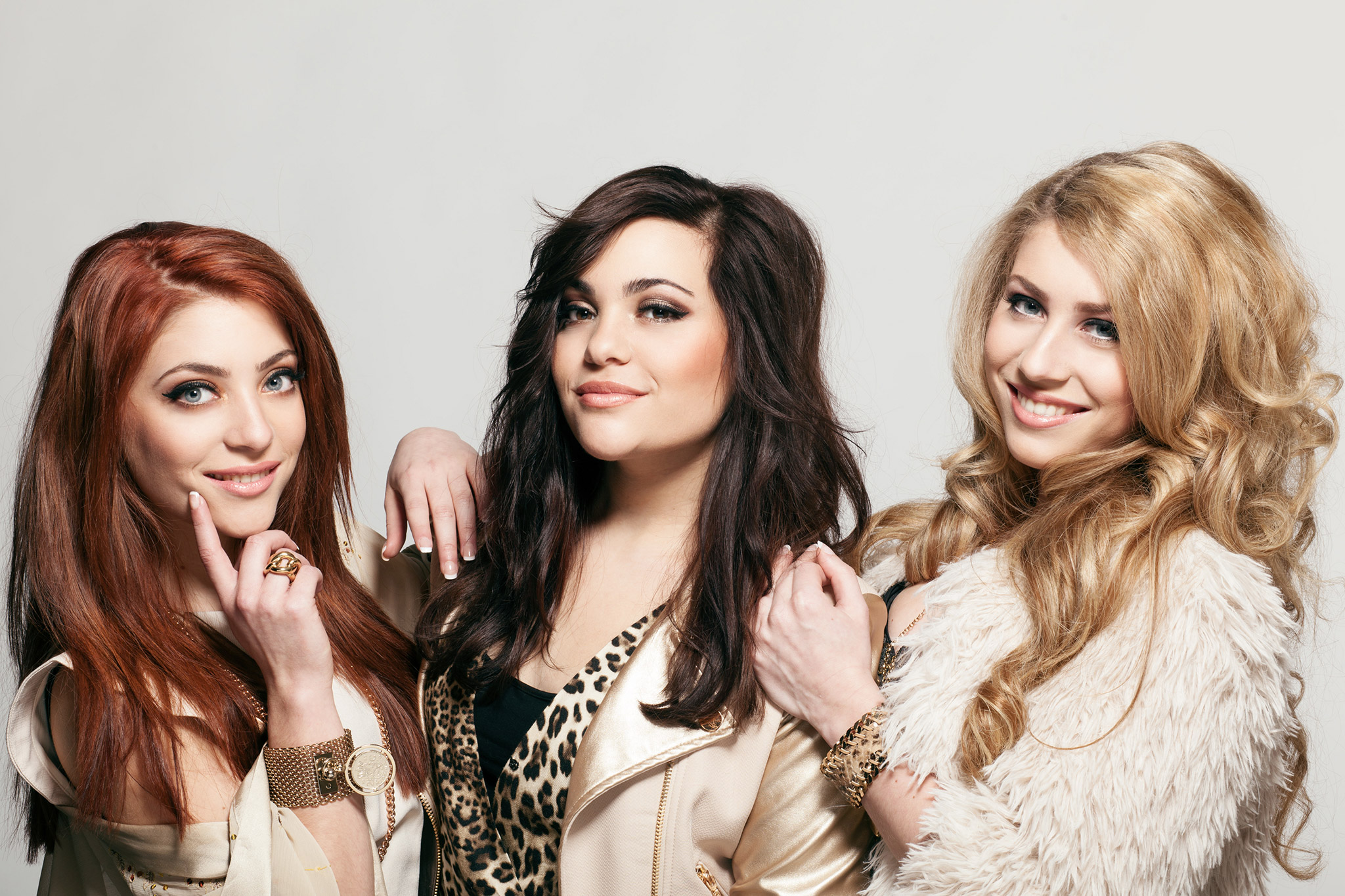
Ogene was internally selected to represent the Netherlands in the Eurovision Song Contest 2017

Following the eleventh place of "Slow Down" performed by Douwe Bob' in the final in 2016, AVROTROS revealed in September 2016 that it would continue to internally select both the artist and song for the Eurovision Song Contest, and that an announcement would be expected in October 2016 after several artists had already been in contact with the broadcaster in regards to participating.

In August 2016, Dutch media reported that AVROTROS had selected the group and winner of the fifth series of the reality singing competition The Voice of Holland Ogene to represent the Netherlands at the 2017 contest. Ogene was confirmed as the Dutch entrant on 29 October 2016. The group consists of sisters Lisa, Amy and Shelley Vol, and had also previously represented the Netherlands at the Junior Eurovision Song Contest 2007 where they placed eleventh out of seventeen entries with the song "Adem in, adem uit". The selection of Ogene as the Dutch representative occurred through the decision of a selection commission consisting of singer and television host Jan Smit, television host and author Cornald Maas, radio DJ Daniël Dekker and AVROTROS media-director Remco van Leen. On 2 January 2017, Shelley Vol revealed during her interview with NPO Radio 2 that three entries had been shortlisted from 40 songs received from songwriters worldwide, one of them which was written by the father of the group members Rick Vol.

On 2 March 2017, Ogene's Eurovision entry, "Lights and Shadows", was presented to the public during a press conference that took place in Amsterdam and hosted by Jan Smit and Cornald Maas. The presentation was streamed online by AVROTROS via YouTube and Facebook. The official video for the song directed by Rolf Meter was released on the same day. The song was written by Rory de Kievit and Rick Vol; O'G3NE revealed earlier during an interview with Radio 538 on 2 February 2017 that Vol's song had been selected as their Eurovision song.

=== Promotion ===
In the lead up to the Eurovision Song Contest, Ogene's promotional activities occurred entirely within the Netherlands where they performed at live events, radio shows and talk shows. On 8 April, Ogene performed during the Eurovision in Concert event which was held at the Melkweg venue in Amsterdam and hosted by Cornald Maas and Selma Björnsdóttir.

== At Eurovision ==
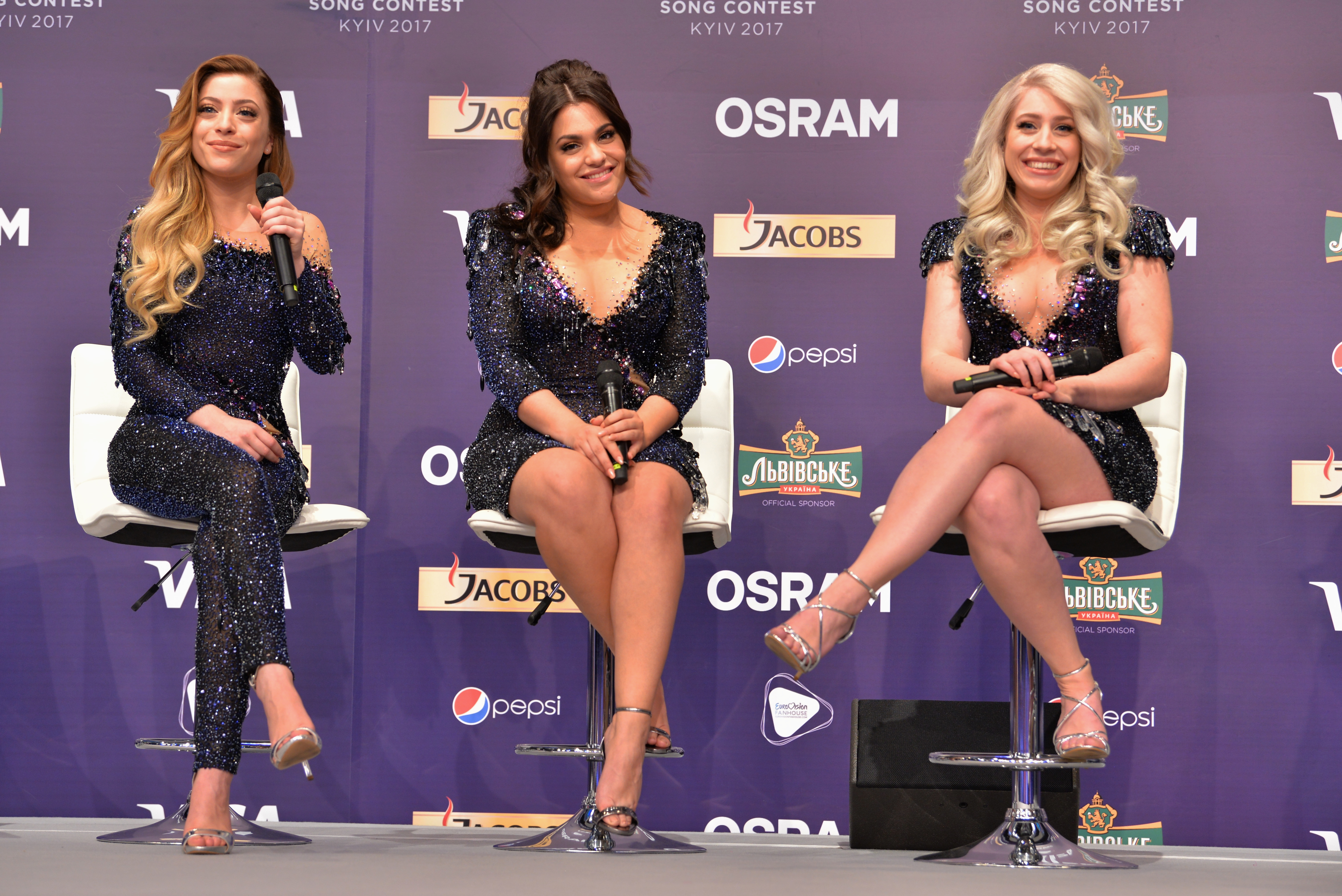
Ogene during a press meet and greet

According to Eurovision rules, all nations with the exceptions of the host country and the "Big Five" (France, Germany, Italy, Spain and the United Kingdom) are required to qualify from one of two semi-finals in order to compete for the final; the top ten countries from each semi-final progress to the final. The European Broadcasting Union (EBU) split up the competing countries into six different pots based on voting patterns from previous contests, with countries with favourable voting histories put into the same pot. On 31 January 2017, a special allocation draw was held which placed each country into one of the two semi-finals, as well as which half of the show they would perform in. The Netherlands was placed into the second semi-final, to be held on 11 May 2017, and was scheduled to perform in the first half of the show.

Once all the competing songs for the 2017 contest had been released, the running order for the semi-finals was decided by the shows' producers rather than through another draw, so that similar songs were not placed next to each other. The Netherlands was set to perform in position 7, following the entry from Romania and before the entry from Hungary. But after Russia was removed from the running order of the competition following their withdrawal from the contest, the Netherlands' position shifted to 6.

The two semi-finals and the final was broadcast in the Netherlands on NPO 1 and BVN with commentary by Cornald Maas and Jan Smit. The Dutch spokesperson, who announced the top 12-point score awarded by the Dutch jury during the final, was 2016 Dutch Eurovision entrant Douwe Bob.

=== Semi-final ===
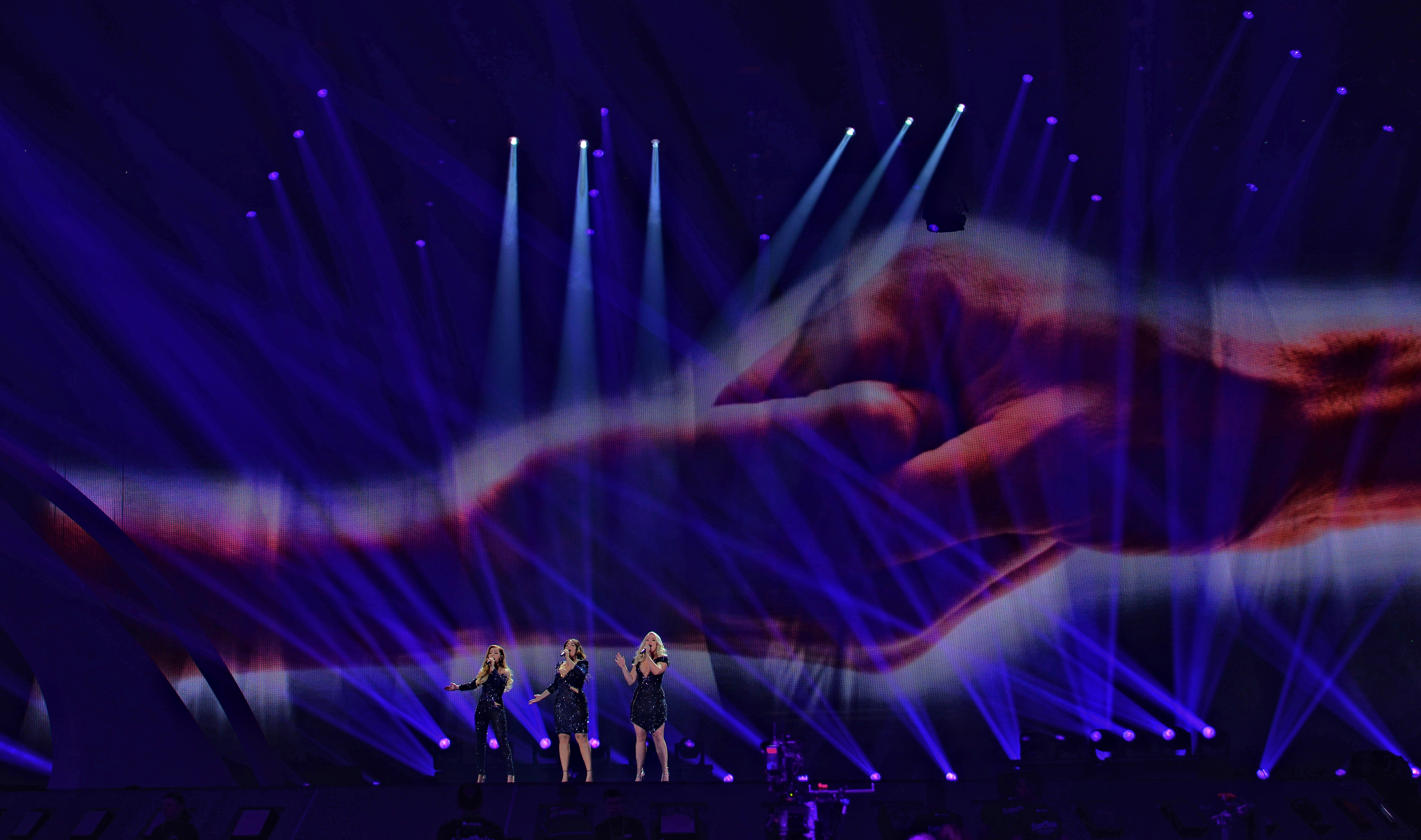
Ogene during a rehearsal before the second semi-final

Ogene took part in technical rehearsals on 2 April and 6 May, followed by dress rehearsals on 10 and 11 May. This included the jury show on 10 May where the professional juries of each country watched and voted on the competing entries.

The Dutch performance featured the members of Ogene wearing black glittery outfits and performing on a predominately dark blue stage with the LED screens displaying various lyrics from the song, candles and an angel image. Towards the end the group members concluded the performance by facing each other. The staging director for the performance was Rolf Meter, who also directed the music video of "Lights and Shadows".

At the end of the show, the Netherlands was announced as having finished in the top 10 and subsequently qualifying for the grand final. It was later revealed that the Netherlands placed fourth in the semi-final, receiving a total of 200 points: 51 points from the televoting and 149 points from the juries.

=== Final ===
Shortly after the second semi-final, a winners' press conference was held for the ten qualifying countries. As part of this press conference, the qualifying artists took part in a draw to determine which half of the grand final they would subsequently participate in. This draw was done in the reverse order the countries appeared in the semi-final running order. The Netherlands was drawn to compete in the first half. Following this draw, the shows' producers decided upon the running order of the final, as they had done for the semi-finals. The Netherlands was subsequently placed to perform in position 6, following the entry from Armenia and before the entry from Moldova.

Ogene once again took part in dress rehearsals on 12 and 13 May before the final, including the jury final where the professional juries cast their final votes before the live show. The group performed a repeat of their semi-final performance during the final on 14 May. The Netherlands placed eleventh in the final, scoring 150 points: 15 points from the televoting and 135 points from the juries.

=== Voting ===
Voting during the three shows involved each country awarding two sets of points from 1-8, 10 and 12: one from their professional jury and the other from televoting. Each nation's jury consisted of five music industry professionals who are citizens of the country they represent, with their names published before the contest to ensure transparency. This jury judged each entry based on: vocal capacity; the stage performance; the song's composition and originality; and the overall impression by the act. In addition, no member of a national jury was permitted to be related in any way to any of the competing acts in such a way that they cannot vote impartially and independently. The individual rankings of each jury member as well as the nation's televoting results were released shortly after the grand final.

Below is a breakdown of points awarded to the Netherlands and awarded by the Netherlands in the second semi-final and grand final of the contest, and the breakdown of the jury voting and televoting conducted during the two shows:

==== Points awarded to the Netherlands ====
Points awarded to the Netherlands (Semi-final 2)
| Score | Televote | Jury |
|---|---|---|
| 12 points | | Croatia; Romania; San Marino |
| 10 points | | Denmark; Hungary |
| 8 points | | Austria; Belarus; Bulgaria; Germany; Norway; Serbia; Switzerland |
| 7 points | Denmark | |
| 6 points | Hungary | Estonia; Macedonia; Malta; Ukraine |
| 5 points | Germany; Ireland | France; Lithuania |
| 4 points | Austria; Israel; Switzerland | |
| 3 points | Malta; Norway; San Marino | Ireland |
| 2 points | Croatia; Estonia; Macedonia | |
| 1 point | Bulgaria | |

Points awarded to the Netherlands (Final)
| Score | Televote | Jury |
|---|---|---|
| 12 points | | Austria; Romania |
| 10 points | Belgium | Bulgaria |
| 8 points | | Croatia; Czech Republic; Hungary; Poland |
| 7 points | | Germany; San Marino; Switzerland |
| 6 points | | |
| 5 points | | Belarus; Denmark |
| 4 points | | Australia; Estonia; France; Ireland; Norway; United Kingdom |
| 3 points | | Portugal; Sweden; Ukraine |
| 2 points | Spain | Lithuania |
| 1 point | Croatia; Denmark; Germany | Georgia; Slovenia; Spain |

==== Points awarded by the Netherlands ====
Points awarded by the Netherlands (Semi-final 2)
| Score | Televote | Jury |
|---|---|---|
| 12 points | Bulgaria | Bulgaria |
| 10 points | Hungary | Denmark |
| 8 points | Romania | Austria |
| 7 points | Israel | Norway |
| 6 points | Austria | Serbia |
| 5 points | Norway | Israel |
| 4 points | Croatia | Switzerland |
| 3 points | Belarus | Malta |
| 2 points | Ireland | Croatia |
| 1 point | Denmark | Romania |

Points awarded by the Netherlands (Final)
| Score | Televote | Jury |
|---|---|---|
| 12 points | Portugal | Portugal |
| 10 points | Belgium | Bulgaria |
| 8 points | Bulgaria | Denmark |
| 7 points | Romania | Norway |
| 6 points | Hungary | Sweden |
| 5 points | Moldova | United Kingdom |
| 4 points | Sweden | Australia |
| 3 points | Croatia | Austria |
| 2 points | Italy | Belgium |
| 1 point | Poland | Romania |

==== Detailed voting results ====
The following members comprised the Dutch jury:

- Marjolein Dekkers (jury chairperson) – Editor in Chief MAX Broadcasting, radio host
- John Ewbank – songwriter, producer
- Gordon Groothedde – producer, composer
- Erica Groeneveld – singer, songwriter
- Matthijs van Duijvenbode – singer, producer, songwriter, musician

Detailed voting results from the Netherlands (Semi-final 2)
| R/O | Country | Jury | | | | | | | Televote | |
| R/O | Country | J. Ewbank | G. Groothedde | M. Dekkers | E. Groeneveld | M. van Duijvenbode | Rank | Points | Rank | Points |
|---|---|---|---|---|---|---|---|---|---|---|
| 01 | Serbia | 5 | 3 | 5 | 4 | 5 | 5 | 6 | 14 | |
| 02 | Austria | 4 | 4 | 7 | 3 | 2 | 3 | 8 | 5 | 6 |
| 03 | Macedonia | 9 | 15 | 9 | 17 | 6 | 11 | | 11 | |
| 04 | Malta | 8 | 5 | 14 | 10 | 12 | 8 | 3 | 16 | |
| 05 | Romania | 10 | 13 | 11 | 12 | 9 | 10 | 1 | 3 | 8 |
| 06 | Netherlands | | | | | | | | | |
| 07 | Hungary | 12 | 14 | 17 | 13 | 14 | 16 | | 2 | 10 |
| 08 | Denmark | 2 | 2 | 3 | 1 | 4 | 2 | 10 | 10 | 1 |
| 09 | Ireland | 15 | 16 | 12 | 11 | 13 | 15 | | 9 | 2 |
| 10 | San Marino | 17 | 17 | 13 | 15 | 17 | 17 | | 17 | |
| 11 | Croatia | 14 | 8 | 16 | 7 | 10 | 9 | 2 | 7 | 4 |
| 12 | Norway | 3 | 7 | 2 | 6 | 3 | 4 | 7 | 6 | 5 |
| 13 | Switzerland | 7 | 9 | 8 | 9 | 7 | 7 | 4 | 13 | |
| 14 | Belarus | 13 | 12 | 15 | 8 | 11 | 12 | | 8 | 3 |
| 15 | Bulgaria | 1 | 1 | 1 | 2 | 1 | 1 | 12 | 1 | 12 |
| 16 | Lithuania | 16 | 10 | 10 | 14 | 16 | 14 | | 15 | |
| 17 | Estonia | 11 | 11 | 6 | 16 | 15 | 13 | | 12 | |
| 18 | Israel | 6 | 6 | 4 | 5 | 8 | 6 | 5 | 4 | 7 |

Detailed voting results from the Netherlands (Final)
| R/O | Country | Jury | | | | | | | Televote | |
| R/O | Country | J. Ewbank | G. Groothedde | M. Dekkers | E. Groeneveld | M. van Duijvenbode | Rank | Points | Rank | Points |
|---|---|---|---|---|---|---|---|---|---|---|
| 01 | Israel | 21 | 14 | 13 | 12 | 21 | 18 | | 16 | |
| 02 | Poland | 25 | 24 | 23 | 24 | 24 | 25 | | 10 | 1 |
| 03 | Belarus | 16 | 17 | 17 | 14 | 16 | 17 | | 19 | |
| 04 | Austria | 15 | 13 | 8 | 6 | 6 | 8 | 3 | 14 | |
| 05 | Armenia | 23 | 20 | 24 | 22 | 20 | 23 | | 11 | |
| 06 | Netherlands | | | | | | | | | |
| 07 | Moldova | 14 | 11 | 10 | 9 | 22 | 14 | | 6 | 5 |
| 08 | Hungary | 10 | 16 | 16 | 20 | 13 | 15 | | 5 | 6 |
| 09 | Italy | 9 | 9 | 19 | 10 | 12 | 11 | | 9 | 2 |
| 10 | Denmark | 3 | 7 | 4 | 2 | 3 | 3 | 8 | 23 | |
| 11 | Portugal | 1 | 2 | 3 | 1 | 1 | 1 | 12 | 1 | 12 |
| 12 | Azerbaijan | 18 | 22 | 18 | 23 | 19 | 20 | | 22 | |
| 13 | Croatia | 20 | 21 | 25 | 18 | 18 | 21 | | 8 | 3 |
| 14 | Australia | 8 | 6 | 6 | 7 | 11 | 7 | 4 | 18 | |
| 15 | Greece | 22 | 18 | 11 | 15 | 17 | 19 | | 21 | |
| 16 | Spain | 24 | 25 | 22 | 25 | 23 | 24 | | 25 | |
| 17 | Norway | 6 | 4 | 2 | 8 | 4 | 4 | 7 | 15 | |
| 18 | United Kingdom | 7 | 8 | 7 | 5 | 7 | 6 | 5 | 13 | |
| 19 | Cyprus | 13 | 10 | 20 | 13 | 8 | 13 | | 17 | |
| 20 | Romania | 5 | 12 | 14 | 19 | 9 | 10 | 1 | 4 | 7 |
| 21 | Germany | 17 | 19 | 15 | 16 | 10 | 16 | | 20 | |
| 22 | Ukraine | 19 | 23 | 21 | 17 | 25 | 22 | | 24 | |
| 23 | Belgium | 11 | 5 | 5 | 21 | 15 | 9 | 2 | 2 | 10 |
| 24 | Sweden | 4 | 3 | 9 | 4 | 5 | 5 | 6 | 7 | 4 |
| 25 | Bulgaria | 2 | 1 | 1 | 3 | 2 | 2 | 10 | 3 | 8 |
| 26 | France | 12 | 15 | 12 | 11 | 14 | 12 | | 12 | |
