= Serbia in the Eurovision Song Contest 2017 =

- Eurovision Song Contest 2017
- Participating broadcaster: Radio Television of Serbia (RTS)
- Country: Serbia
- Selection process: Internal selection
- Announcement date: Artist: 27 February 2017; Song: 11 March 2017

Competing entry
- Song: "In Too Deep"
- Artist: Tijana Bogićević
- Songwriters: Borislav Milanov; Joacim Bo Persson; Johan Alkenäs; Lisa Desmond

Placement
- Semi-final result: Failed to qualify (11th)

Participation chronology

Serbia was represented at the Eurovision Song Contest 2017 with the song "In Too Deep" written by Borislav Milanov, Joacim Bo Persson, Johan Alkenäs and Lisa Desmond. The song was performed by Tijana Bogićević, who was internally selected by the Serbian national broadcaster, Radio Television of Serbia (RTS) to represent Serbia in the 2017 contest in Kyiv, Ukraine. Bogićević was announced as the Serbian representative on 27 February 2017, while the song, "In Too Deep", was presented on 11 March 2017.

Serbia was drawn to compete in the second semi-final of the Eurovision Song Contest which took place on 11 May 2017. Performing as the opening entry for the show in position 1, "In Too Deep" was not announced among the top 10 entries of the second semi-final and therefore did not qualify to compete in the final. It was later revealed that Serbia placed eleventh out of the 18 participating countries in the semi-final with 98 points.

== Background ==
Prior to the 2017 contest, Serbia had participated in the Eurovision Song Contest nine times since its first entry in 2007, winning the contest with their debut entry "Molitva" performed by Marija Šerifović. Since 2007, seven out of nine of Serbia's entries have featured in the final with the nation failing to qualify in 2009 and 2013. Serbia's 2016 entry "Goodbye (Shelter)" performed by Sanja Vučić ZAA qualified to the final and placed eighteenth.

The Serbian national broadcaster, Radio Television of Serbia (RTS), broadcasts the event within Serbia and organises the selection process for the nation's entry. RTS confirmed their intentions to participate at the 2017 Eurovision Song Contest on 5 October 2016. Between 2007 and 2009, Serbia used the Beovizija national final in order to select their entry. However, after their 2009 entry, "Cipela" performed by Marko Kon and Milaan, failed to qualify Serbia to the final, the broadcaster shifted their selection strategy to selecting specific composers to create songs for artists. In 2010, RTS selected Goran Bregović to compose songs for a national final featuring three artists, while in 2011 Kornelije Kovač, Aleksandra Kovač and Kristina Kovač were tasked with composing one song each. In 2012, the internal selection of Željko Joksimović and the song "Nije ljubav stvar" secured the country's second highest placing in the contest to this point, placing third. In 2013, RTS returned to an open national final format and organized the Beosong competition. The winning entry, "Ljubav je svuda" performed by Moje 3, failed to qualify Serbia to the final at the Eurovision Song Contest 2013. In 2015, RTS selected Vladimir Graić, the composer of Serbia's 2007 Eurovision Song Contest winning entry "Molitva", to compose songs for a national final featuring three artists. In 2016, RTS internally selected the Serbian entry with the decision made by RTS music editors.

== Before Eurovision ==
=== Internal selection ===
RTS internally selected the Serbian entry for the Eurovision Song Contest 2017 with the decision made by RTS music editors. The name of the artist to represent Serbia, Tijana Bogićević, was confirmed by RTS on 27 February 2017. In addition to attempting to represent Serbia at the Eurovision Song Contest in 2009 with the song "Pazi šta radiš", failing to qualify from the semi-final in the national final, Tijana Bogićević previously represented Serbia in the Eurovision Song Contest 2011 as a backing vocalist for Nina Radojičić. It was also announced on the same day that the song Bogićević would perform at the Eurovision Song Contest would be written by members of the songwriting team Symphonix International, Borislav Milanov, Joacim Bo Persson, Johan Alkenäs and Lisa Desmond.

The Serbian entry, "In Too Deep", was presented through the release of the official music video via the official Eurovision Song Contest's YouTube channel on 11 March 2017. In regards to the song, songwriter Borislav Milanov stated: "The song is worldly but it has a Balkan element. It took us two or three months for the song to be ready. The Eurovision Song Contest has been modernized in recent years. New ideas are being presented, the quality is at a high level and the whole competition is moving forward into the future."

=== Promotion ===
Tijana Bogićević made several appearances across Europe to specifically promote "In Too Deep" as the Serbian Eurovision entry. Between 3 and 6 April, Bogićević took part in promotional activities in Tel Aviv, Israel where she performed during the Israel Calling event held at the Ha'teatron venue. On 8 April, Tijana Bogićević performed during the Eurovision in Concert event which was held at the Melkweg venue in Amsterdam, Netherlands and hosted by Cornald Maas and Selma Björnsdóttir. On 15 April, Bogićević performed during the Eurovision Spain Pre-Party, which was held at the Sala La Riviera venue in Madrid, Spain.

== At Eurovision ==
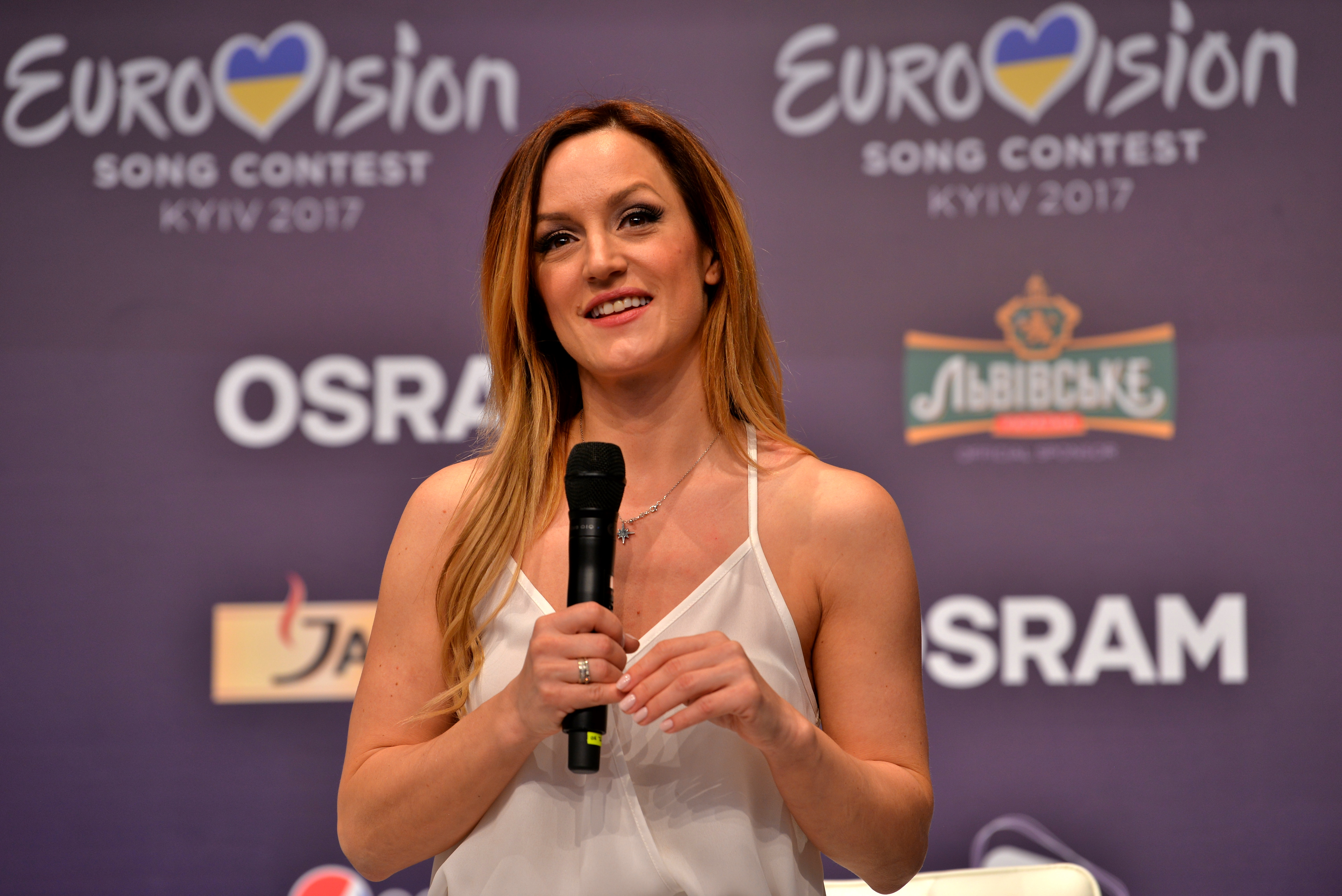
Tijana Bogićević during a press meet and greet

According to Eurovision rules, all nations with the exceptions of the host country and the "Big Five" (France, Germany, Italy, Spain and the United Kingdom) are required to qualify from one of two semi-finals in order to compete for the final; the top ten countries from each semi-final progress to the final. The European Broadcasting Union (EBU) split up the competing countries into six different pots based on voting patterns from previous contests, with countries with favourable voting histories put into the same pot. On 31 January 2017, a special allocation draw was held which placed each country into one of the two semi-finals, as well as which half of the show they would perform in. Serbia was placed into the second semi-final, to be held on 11 May 2017, and was scheduled to perform in the first half of the show.

Once all the competing songs for the 2017 contest had been released, the running order for the semi-finals was decided by the shows' producers rather than through another draw, so that similar songs were not placed next to each other. Serbia was set to open the show and perform in position 1, before the entry from Austria.

The two semi-finals and the final were broadcast in Serbia on RTS1, RTS HD and RTS Sat with commentary for the first semi-final by Silvana Grujić and Olga Kapor and commentary for the second semi-final and final by Duška Vučinić. The Serbian spokesperson, who announced the top 12-point score awarded by the Serbian jury during the final, was former Serbian Eurovision contestant Sanja Vučić who represented Serbia in 2016.

=== Semi-final ===
Tijana Bogićević took part in technical rehearsals on 4 and 7 May, followed by dress rehearsals on 11 and 12 May. This included the jury show on 11 May where the professional juries of each country watched and voted on the competing entries.

The Serbian performance featured Tijana Bogićević performing in a silver leotard with white flowing fabrics covering the sleeves and bottom half together with a ballet dancer Boris Vidaković. The stage lighting and background LED screens predominantly displayed dark blue colours and bubbles of water bursting out. In regards to the staging, Bogićević commented: "The song is basically a love song about a woman who is deeply in love and losing her mind. We decided to put in a little twist at the end of the performance – you really don't have to fall deep, you can save yourself." Tijana Bogićević was joined by three off-stage backing vocalists: Jelena Đurić, Sanja Bogosavljević and Jelena Pajić.

At the end of the show, Serbia was not announced among the 10 qualifying entries in the second semi-final and therefore failed to qualify to compete in the final. It was later revealed that Serbia placed eleventh in the semi-final, receiving a total of 98 points: 45 points from the televoting and 53 points from the juries, missing the qualification by just 3 points.

=== Voting ===
Voting during the three shows involved each country awarding two sets of points from 1–8, 10 and 12: one from their professional jury and the other from televoting. Each nation's jury consisted of five music industry professionals who are citizens of the country they represent, with their names published before the contest to ensure transparency. This jury judged each entry based on: vocal capacity; the stage performance; the song's composition and originality; and the overall impression by the act. In addition, no member of a national jury was permitted to be related in any way to any of the competing acts in such a way that they cannot vote impartially and independently. The individual rankings of each jury member as well as the nation's televoting results were released shortly after the grand final.

Below is a breakdown of points awarded to Serbia and awarded by Serbia in the second semi-final and grand final of the contest, and the breakdown of the jury voting and televoting conducted during the two shows:

==== Points awarded to Serbia ====
Points awarded to Serbia (Semi-final 2)
Score	Televote	Jury
12 points	Macedonia; Switzerland	
10 points	Croatia	
8 points		Denmark
7 points		Germany
6 points	Austria	Netherlands; Norway; Switzerland
5 points	France	
4 points		Belarus; Hungary
3 points		
2 points		Bulgaria; Croatia; Ireland; Malta; San Marino
1 point		Estonia; France

==== Points awarded by Serbia ====
Points awarded by Serbia (Semi-final 2)
Score	Televote	Jury
12 points	Hungary	Hungary
10 points	Macedonia	Bulgaria
8 points	Bulgaria	Netherlands
7 points	Croatia	Israel
6 points	Romania	Austria
5 points	Israel	Macedonia
4 points	Switzerland	Denmark
3 points	Norway	Croatia
2 points	Belarus	Malta
1 point	Austria	Norway

Points awarded by Serbia (Final)
Score	Televote	Jury
12 points	Hungary	Portugal
10 points	Bulgaria	Hungary
8 points	Portugal	Italy
7 points	Moldova	Moldova
6 points	Italy	Bulgaria
5 points	Croatia	Armenia
4 points	Romania	Austria
3 points	Belgium	Australia
2 points	France	Sweden
1 point	Sweden	Israel

==== Detailed voting results ====
The following members comprised the Serbian jury:

- Vojislav "Vojkan" Borisavljević (jury chairperson) – composer
- Ivana Peters – composer, singer
- Tanja Banjanin – singer
- Aleksandar Milić (Mili) – composer, singer
- Ana Štajdohar – singer

Detailed voting results from Serbia (Semi-final 2)
R/O	Country	Jury							Televote	
R/O	Country	I. Peters	T. Banjanin	V. Borisavljević	Mili	A. Štajdohar	Rank	Points	Rank	Points
01	Serbia									
02	Austria	5	5	6	11	6	5	6	10	1
03	Macedonia	7	10	5	7	5	6	5	2	10
04	Malta	8	4	8	9	12	9	2	16	
05	Romania	17	17	17	10	16	17		5	6
06	Netherlands	3	1	1	4	7	3	8	11	
07	Hungary	1	2	3	1	1	1	12	1	12
08	Denmark	6	8	9	6	8	7	4	12	
09	Ireland	16	15	16	8	15	15		14	
10	San Marino	15	13	15	12	10	14		15	
11	Croatia	4	11	4	3	17	8	3	4	7
12	Norway	13	6	13	17	3	10	1	8	3
13	Switzerland	14	12	12	15	11	13		7	4
14	Belarus	12	16	14	16	14	16		9	2
15	Bulgaria	2	3	2	2	2	2	10	3	8
16	Lithuania	11	9	10	14	9	11		17	
17	Estonia	10	14	11	13	13	12		13	
18	Israel	9	7	7	5	4	4	7	6	5

Detailed voting results from Serbia (Final)
R/O	Country	Jury							Televote	
R/O	Country	I. Peters	T. Banjanin	V. Borisavljević	Mili	A. Štajdohar	Rank	Points	Rank	Points
01	Israel	10	11	11	11	12	10	1	14	
02	Poland	22	16	16	23	18	20		24	
03	Belarus	23	24	23	14	24	24		15	
04	Austria	6	8	12	12	10	7	4	20	
05	Armenia	15	6	10	8	9	6	5	17	
06	Netherlands	14	15	6	13	19	13		19	
07	Moldova	8	1	3	7	4	4	7	4	7
08	Hungary	2	3	4	1	2	2	10	1	12
09	Italy	3	4	1	2	3	3	8	5	6
10	Denmark	18	19	20	22	20	21		22	
11	Portugal	1	2	2	3	1	1	12	3	8
12	Azerbaijan	24	12	17	9	16	18		21	
13	Croatia	11	25	8	4	26	15		6	5
14	Australia	7	10	14	10	8	8	3	16	
15	Greece	16	9	18	6	21	14		13	
16	Spain	25	21	25	18	25	25		23	
17	Norway	9	5	13	25	6	11		12	
18	United Kingdom	17	17	21	21	14	19		18	
19	Cyprus	12	13	19	17	17	16		11	
20	Romania	26	26	26	16	23	26		7	4
21	Germany	20	18	22	24	22	22		26	
22	Ukraine	13	20	15	15	15	17		25	
23	Belgium	21	23	24	26	13	23		8	3
24	Sweden	4	14	5	20	7	9	2	10	1
25	Bulgaria	5	7	9	19	5	5	6	2	10
26	France	19	22	7	5	11	12		9	2
