= Croatia in the Eurovision Song Contest 2017 =

- Eurovision Song Contest 2017
- Country: Croatia
- Selection process: Internal selection
- Announcement date: Artist: 17 February 2017; Song: 2 March 2017

Competing entry
- Song: "My Friend"
- Artist: Jacques Houdek
- Songwriters: Jacques Houdek; Siniša Reljić; Tony Malm; Ines Prajo; Arjana Kunštek; Fabrizio Laucella

Placement
- Semi-final result: Qualified (8th, 141 points)
- Final result: 13th, 128 points

Participation chronology

Croatia was represented at the Eurovision Song Contest 2017 with the song "My Friend" written by Jacques Houdek, Tony Roberth Malm, Siniša Reljić, Arjana Kunštek, Ines Prajo and Fabrizio Laucella. The song was performed by Jacques Houdek, who was selected internally by the Croatian broadcaster Croatian Radiotelevision (HRT) on 17 February 2017 to represent Croatia at the 2017 contest in Kyiv, Ukraine. His song "My Friend" was presented to the public on 2 March 2017 during the radio programme Svijet diskografije broadcast on the HR 2 station.

Croatia was drawn to compete in the second semi-final of the Eurovision Song Contest which took place on 11 May 2017. Performing during the show in position 11, "My Friend" was announced among the top 10 entries of the second semi-final and therefore qualified to compete in the final on 13 May. It was later revealed that Croatia placed eighth out of the 18 participating countries in the semi-final with 141 points. In the final, Croatia performed in position 13 and placed thirteenth out of the 26 participating countries, scoring 128 points.

== Background ==
Prior to the 2017 contest, Croatia had participated in the Eurovision Song Contest twenty-two times since its first entry in 1993. The nation's best result in the contest was fourth, which it achieved on two occasions: in 1996 with the song "Sveta ljubav" performed by Maja Blagdan and in 1999 with the song "Marija Magdalena" performed by Doris Dragović. Following the introduction of semi-finals in 2004, Croatia had thus far featured in six finals. After the Croatian entries failed to qualify from the semi-finals between 2010 and 2013, Croatia managed to qualify to the final in 2016 with Nina Kraljić and the song "Lighthouse".

The Croatian national broadcaster, Croatian Radiotelevision (HRT), broadcasts the event within Croatia and organises the selection process for the nation's entry. HRT confirmed Croatia's participation in the 2017 Eurovision Song Contest on 17 September 2016. Between 1993 and 2011, HRT organised the national final Dora in order to select the Croatian entry for the Eurovision Song Contest. In 2012 and 2013, the broadcaster opted to internally select the entry. The Croatian broadcaster continued the internal selection procedure in 2016 as well as in 2017 after missing the contest in 2014 and 2015.

== Before Eurovision ==
=== Internal selection ===
On 17 February 2017, the Croatian national broadcaster HRT announced that it had internally selected Jacques Houdek to represent Croatia at the Eurovision Song Contest 2017. Jacques Houdek previously attempted to represent Croatia at the Eurovision Song Contest on several occasions: in 2002 with "Čarolija" placing thirteenth, in 2003 with "Na krilima ljubavi" placing fifth, in 2004 with "Nema razloga" placing fourth, in 2005 with "Nepobjediva" placing fourth, and in 2011 placing second. In regards to his selection as the Croatian entrant, Houdek stated: "I am extremely happy and thank Croatian Radio and Television for the trust they have shown. Being a representative of Croatia at the Eurovision Song Contest is a big honour for me and I'm grateful for the opportunity. I have been living for this for the past ten months, all of my artistic capabilities have been directed towards writing this song and I can barely wait for listeners to let it into their hearts."

The song that Houdek performed at the Eurovision Song Contest, "My Friend", was presented on 2 March 2017 during the radio programme Svijet diskografije broadcast on HR 2 and hosted by Zlatko Turkalj Turki. The song was written by Jacques Houdek himself, Tony Roberth Malm, Siniša Reljić, Arjana Kunštek, Ines Prajo and Fabrizio Laucella. Kunštek and Prajo were also the co-writers of "Ne brini", the Bosnian Eurovision Song Contest entry in 2003. In regards to his song, Houdek stated: "This is the song of my life and certainly the best thing I wrote so far. I'm happy that I have gathered such a great team of authors who have helped me to make the idea of the song come true and we believe that it will represent our homeland in the most beautiful light".

=== Preparation ===
Following the presentation show, the preview video submitted for the Eurovision Song Contest by HRT for "My Friend" premiered, which was directed by Dario Lepoglavec and featured illustrations by Annamaria Gržetić and Deniss Grgić. In late March, Houdek filmed the music video for "My Friend", which was directed by Katja Restović. The music video was released to the public on 4 April.

== At Eurovision ==
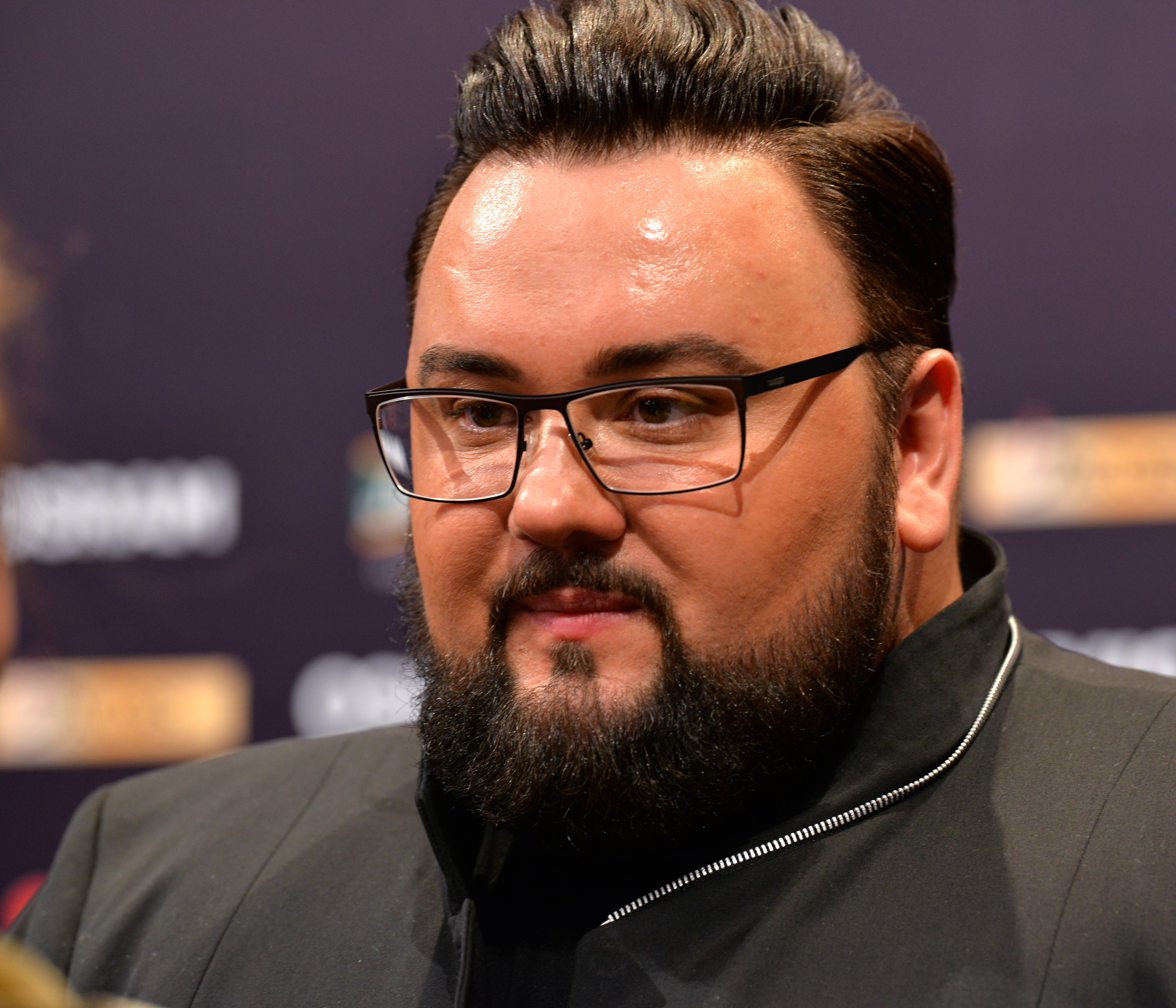
Jacques Houdek during a press meet and greet

According to Eurovision rules, all nations with the exceptions of the host country and the "Big Five" (France, Germany, Italy, Spain and the United Kingdom) are required to qualify from one of two semi-finals in order to compete for the final; the top ten countries from each semi-final progress to the final. The European Broadcasting Union (EBU) split up the competing countries into six different pots based on voting patterns from previous contests, with countries with favourable voting histories put into the same pot. On 31 January 2017, a special allocation draw was held which placed each country into one of the two semi-finals, as well as which half of the show they would perform in. Croatia was placed into the second semi-final, to be held on 11 May 2017, and was scheduled to perform in the second half of the show.

Once all the competing songs for the 2017 contest had been released, the running order for the semi-finals was decided by the shows' producers rather than through another draw, so that similar songs were not placed next to each other. Croatia was set to perform in position 12, following the entry from San Marino and before the entry from Norway. But after Russia was removed from the running order of the competition following their withdrawal from the contest, Croatia's position shifted to 11.

The two semi-finals and the final were broadcast in Croatia on HRT 1 with commentary by Duško Ćurlić. The three shows were also broadcast via radio on HR 2 with commentary by Zlatko Turkalj Turki. The Croatian spokesperson, who announced the top 12-point score awarded by the Croatian jury during the final, was Uršula Tolj.

=== Semi-final ===
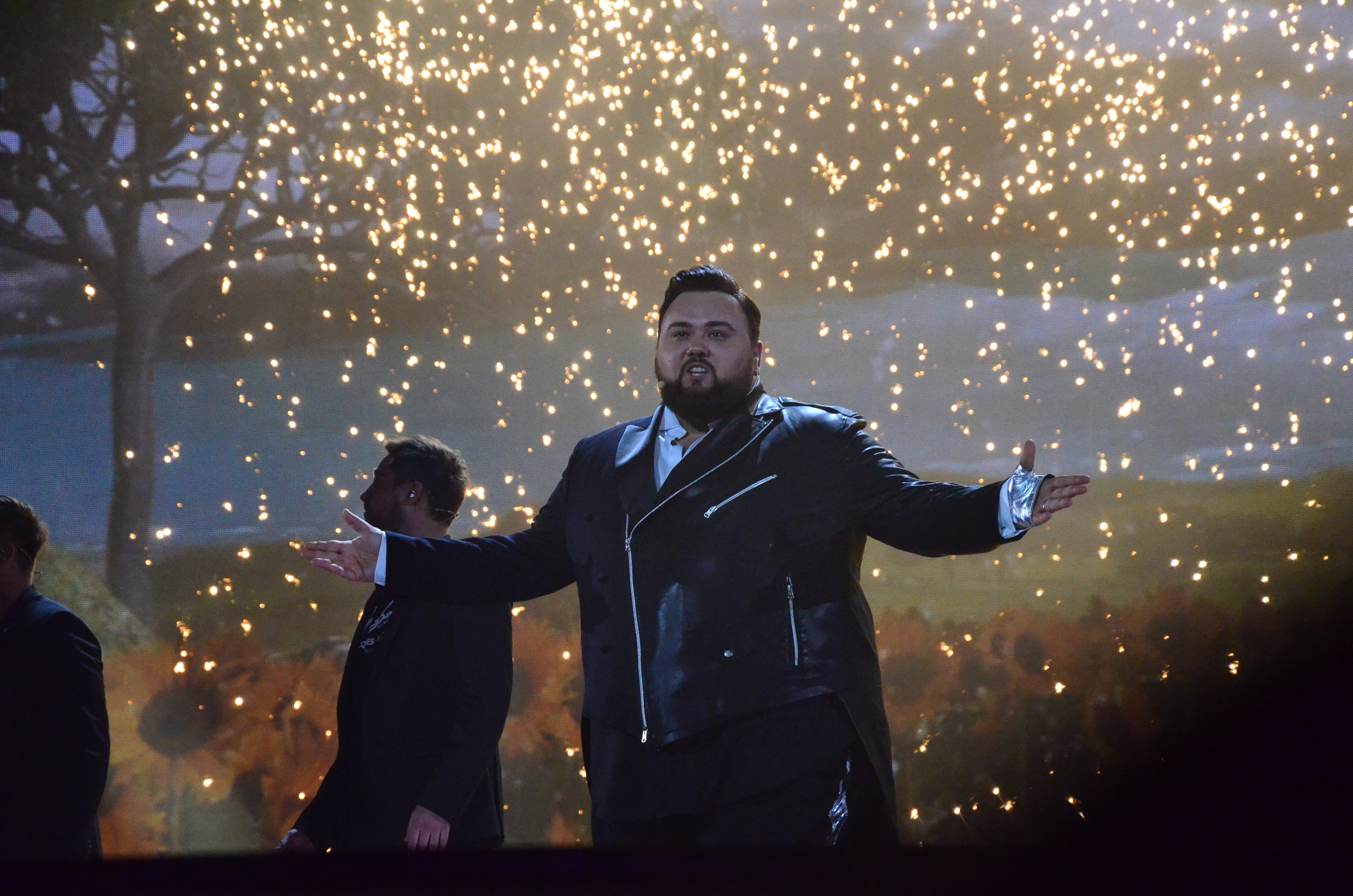
Jacques Houdek during a rehearsal before the second semi-final

Jacques Houdek took part in technical rehearsals on 3 and 6 May, followed by dress rehearsals on 10 and 11 May. This included the jury show on 10 May where the professional juries of each country watched and voted on the competing entries.

The Croatian performance featured Jacques Houdek dressed in a black half-and-half costume including a suit and leather jacket, joined on stage by two instrumentalists and three backing vocalists dressed in black suits. Houdek's outfit was designed by Marco Falcioni. The LED screens transitioned from images of Houdek that turned to each side when his voice changed to a sunflower and rainbow backdrop. At the end of the song, the performers all came together. The performance also featured a pyrotechnic waterfall effect. The three backing vocalists that joined Houdek were: Alen Đuras, Edgar Rupena and Matija Cvek, while the two instrumentalists were violinist Antun Stašić and cellist Emanuel Pavon.

At the end of the show, Croatia was announced as having finished in the top 10 and subsequently qualifying for the grand final. It was later revealed that Croatia placed eighth in the semi-final, receiving a total of 141 points: 104 points from the televoting and 37 points from the juries.

=== Final ===
Shortly after the second semi-final, a winners' press conference was held for the ten qualifying countries. As part of this press conference, the qualifying artists took part in a draw to determine which half of the grand final they would subsequently participate in. This draw was done in the reverse order the countries appeared in the semi-final running order. Croatia was drawn to compete in the first half. Following this draw, the shows' producers decided upon the running order of the final, as they had done for the semi-finals. Croatia was subsequently placed to perform in position 13, following the entry from Azerbaijan and before the entry from Australia.

Jacques Houdek once again took part in dress rehearsals on 12 and 13 May before the final, including the jury final where the professional juries cast their final votes before the live show. Jacques Houdek performed a repeat of his semi-final performance during the final on 13 May. Croatia placed thirteenth in the final, scoring 128 points: 103 points from the televoting and 25 points from the juries.

=== Voting ===
Voting during the three shows involved each country awarding two sets of points from 1-8, 10 and 12: one from their professional jury and the other from televoting. Each nation's jury consisted of five music industry professionals who are citizens of the country they represent, with their names published before the contest to ensure transparency. This jury judged each entry based on: vocal capacity; the stage performance; the song's composition and originality; and the overall impression by the act. In addition, no member of a national jury was permitted to be related in any way to any of the competing acts in such a way that they cannot vote impartially and independently. The individual rankings of each jury member as well as the nation's televoting results were released shortly after the grand final.

Below is a breakdown of points awarded to Croatia and awarded by Croatia in the second semi-final and grand final of the contest, and the breakdown of the jury voting and televoting conducted during the two shows:

==== Points awarded to Croatia ====
Points awarded to Croatia (Semi-final 2)
Score	Televote	Jury
12 points		
10 points	Austria; Hungary; Switzerland	
8 points	Macedonia; Malta	
7 points	Ireland; Serbia	Romania
6 points	Bulgaria; Germany; San Marino	Bulgaria
5 points	Estonia; Romania	Germany; Ukraine
4 points	Belarus; Netherlands	San Marino
3 points	Ukraine	Belarus; Serbia
2 points	France; Lithuania	Netherlands
1 point	Norway	Austria; Norway

Points awarded to Croatia (Final)
Score	Televote	Jury
12 points	Montenegro; Slovenia	
10 points	Macedonia	
8 points	Germany; Switzerland	
7 points	Albania	Ukraine
6 points	Italy	Malta
5 points	Hungary; Serbia; United Kingdom	Montenegro
4 points	Austria	
3 points	Ireland; Malta; Netherlands; Romania; San Marino	Germany; Romania
2 points	Sweden	
1 point	Australia; Bulgaria; Norway; Poland	Azerbaijan

==== Points awarded by Croatia ====
Points awarded by Croatia (Semi-final 2)
Score	Televote	Jury
12 points	Hungary	Netherlands
10 points	Serbia	Hungary
8 points	Bulgaria	Denmark
7 points	Romania	Belarus
6 points	Macedonia	Bulgaria
5 points	Israel	Austria
4 points	Austria	Norway
3 points	Belarus	Israel
2 points	Netherlands	Serbia
1 point	Switzerland	Malta

Points awarded by Croatia (Final)
Score	Televote	Jury
12 points	Hungary	Hungary
10 points	Portugal	Bulgaria
8 points	Bulgaria	Netherlands
7 points	Italy	Portugal
6 points	Romania	Australia
5 points	Belgium	Belarus
4 points	Moldova	Sweden
3 points	France	Denmark
2 points	Sweden	Norway
1 point	Netherlands	Austria

==== Detailed voting results ====
The following members comprised the Croatian jury:

- Tihomir Preradović (jury chairperson) – producer, arranger, composer, multi-instrumentalist
- Dino Jelusić – rock singer, musician, songwriter, winner of the Junior Eurovision Song Contest 2003
- Saša Lozar – singer
- Ivana Kindl – singer, songwriter
- Sanja Doležal – singer, television host, represented Yugoslavia in the 1987 contest as part of Novi fosili

Detailed voting results from Croatia (Semi-final 2)
R/O	Country	Jury							Televote	
R/O	Country	T. Preradović	D. Jelusić	S. Lozar	I. Kindl	S. Doležal	Rank	Points	Rank	Points
01	Serbia	9	15	9	10	10	9	2	2	10
02	Austria	5	9	5	4	5	6	5	7	4
03	Macedonia	13	14	11	14	11	13		5	6
04	Malta	10	8	14	12	9	10	1	16	
05	Romania	17	16	17	17	17	17		4	7
06	Netherlands	1	1	3	1	2	1	12	9	2
07	Hungary	2	4	1	2	1	2	10	1	12
08	Denmark	4	2	4	5	6	3	8	14	
09	Ireland	14	17	10	16	16	16		13	
10	San Marino	11	13	16	15	13	14		15	
11	Croatia									
12	Norway	8	10	2	11	4	7	4	11	
13	Switzerland	15	7	13	9	15	12		10	1
14	Belarus	3	3	7	6	3	4	7	8	3
15	Bulgaria	6	5	6	3	7	5	6	3	8
16	Lithuania	12	11	12	8	12	11		17	
17	Estonia	16	12	15	13	14	15		12	
18	Israel	7	6	8	7	8	8	3	6	5

Detailed voting results from Croatia (Final)
R/O	Country	Jury							Televote	
R/O	Country	T. Preradović	D. Jelusić	S. Lozar	I. Kindl	S. Doležal	Rank	Points	Rank	Points
01	Israel	18	13	18	24	16	18		19	
02	Poland	22	7	14	12	17	13		22	
03	Belarus	2	8	11	9	7	6	5	11	
04	Austria	9	14	10	8	10	10	1	15	
05	Armenia	6	23	15	25	15	16		23	
06	Netherlands	3	1	6	2	5	3	8	10	1
07	Moldova	13	11	13	19	11	12		7	4
08	Hungary	1	9	1	1	1	1	12	1	12
09	Italy	19	24	9	13	12	15		4	7
10	Denmark	10	2	12	4	13	8	3	20	
11	Portugal	5	5	4	6	3	4	7	2	10
12	Azerbaijan	17	22	17	17	18	20		14	
13	Croatia									
14	Australia	7	4	8	7	4	5	6	12	
15	Greece	23	16	21	20	19	22		24	
16	Spain	24	15	24	18	25	24		25	
17	Norway	14	12	7	5	9	9	2	13	
18	United Kingdom	15	17	5	14	8	11		16	
19	Cyprus	16	18	19	21	24	21		17	
20	Romania	8	6	25	15	20	14		5	6
21	Germany	21	20	20	11	14	17		18	
22	Ukraine	20	25	23	16	22	23		21	
23	Belgium	25	21	22	23	23	25		6	5
24	Sweden	11	10	2	10	6	7	4	9	2
25	Bulgaria	4	3	3	3	2	2	10	3	8
26	France	12	19	16	22	21	19		8	3
