= Sada Vidoo =

Danish singer and songwriter

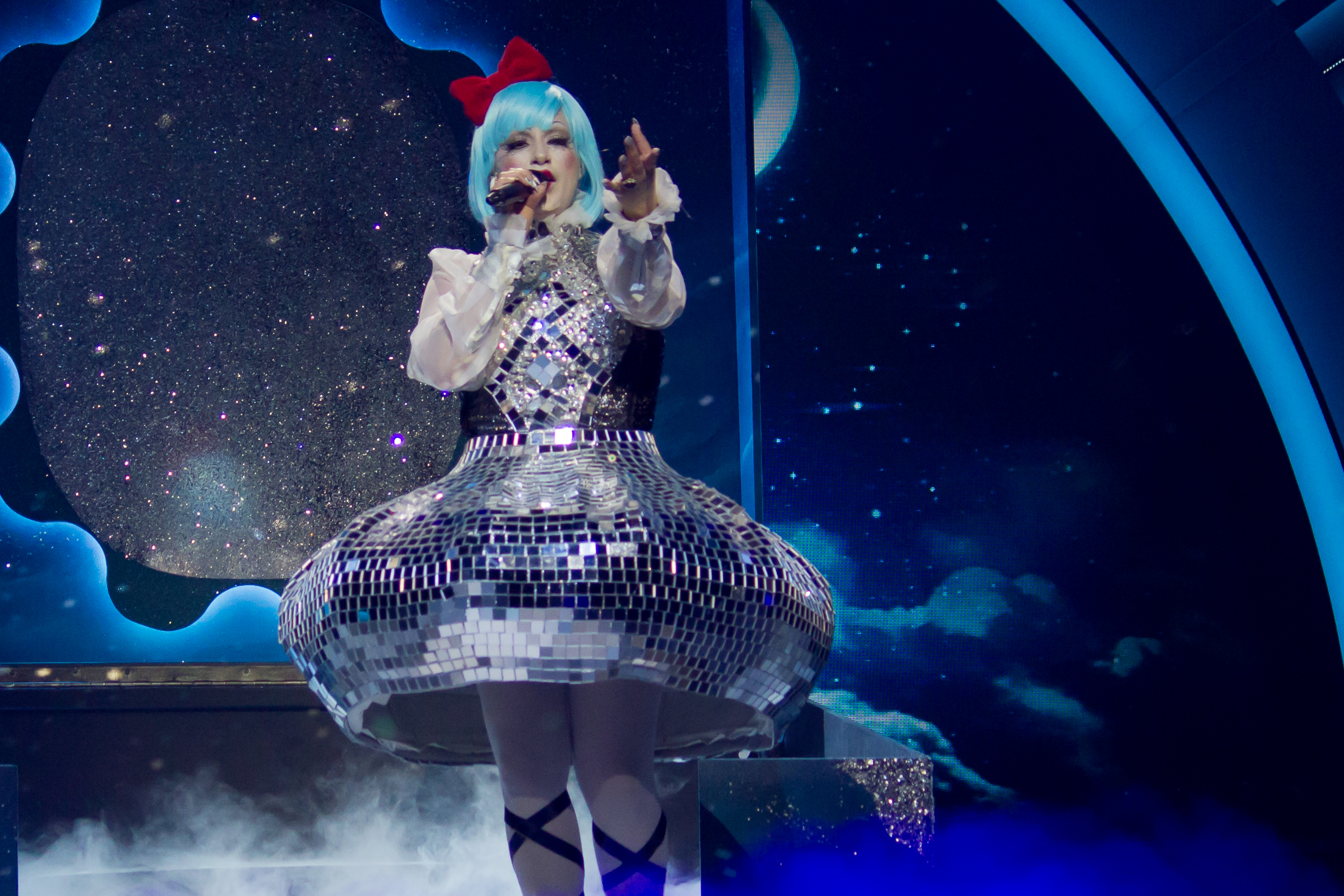

Background information
- Also known as: Nicole; Miss Nicole
- Born: Nicole Stokholm Pedersen; 30 June 1977 (age 49); Copenhagen, Denmark
- Genres: Pop, Alternative
- Occupations: Singer; songwriter
- Instrument: Vocals
- Years active: 2001–present
- Labels: Cross Over; Target; Virgin Records Denmark
- Website: sadavidoo.com

Nicole Stokholm Pedersen (born 30 June 1977), known professionally as Sada Vidoo, is a Danish-Palestinian singer and songwriter. She is best known for taking part in series 13 of The X Factor UK and Dansk Melodi Grand Prix 2017.

== Life and career ==
=== Early life and career beginnings ===
Nicole Stokholm Pedersen was born on 30 June 1977 in Copenhagen to a Danish mother and a Palestinian father, who left Vidoo's family when she was young. Because she was bullied at school, she started writing and recording songs as a form of escape. As a result, Vidoo pursued a music career.

Under her given name Nicole, she signed a record deal with Virgin Records Denmark in the late 1990s and came to prominence by singing the hook to DJ Aligator's 2000 single "Lollipop". The song hit the top 10 in Norway and Sweden and was the sixth best-selling single of 2000 in Denmark. Her debut single, "Hide Away", was released in 2001, and a series of singles through Virgin followed until the label dropped her because the singer was not "pretty enough for the camera." Since then, Vidoo focused on songwriting. Her first hit as a songwriter became "Ten Miles", released by Infernal in 2006. The song hit number two on the Polish Airplay Chart and was certified Platinum in Denmark. Between 2002 and 2007, the artist would tour as the lead singer for Snap! in Europe. In 2008, she became a finalist on the Danish vocal talent show Elsk mig i nat from Kanal 5. As Nicole Stokholm, the singer was part of the group The Stokholm Promise, which released the 2010 charity single "United" featuring Danish rapper M.I.L.O.—former ISAF 9 soldier—in honour of Danish soldiers who died in Afghanistan. Also in 2010, the artist adopted the stage name Miss Nicole and was featured on Danish rapper Sami Krid's Danish-language single "Kostbar", which had a music video released in 2011.

=== 2012–present: A Story with No End, The X Factor and Dansk Melodi Grand Prix ===
In 2012, Vidoo moved to London, where she started working with British musicians Russ and Chris Ballard. She later adopted her "living doll" persona Sada Vidoo, and released her debut album A Story with No End on 11 August 2014 through Target Records. The album includes three singles—"The Actress", "China Doll", and a cover of Pat Benatar's "Love Is a Battlefield"—and received mixed to positive reviews. The singer performed at the 2014 edition of Copenhagen Pride also in August of that year. With "Love Is a Battlefield", Vidoo auditioned for the thirteenth series of the British The X Factor in 2016. After singing "Hold On" in bootcamp and "Numb" during the Six-Chair Challenge, she was eliminated in the process of going to the Judge's House with mentor Sharon Osbourne in the "Over 25" category. Vidoo was among the auditionees who returned to the X Factor stage and performed "Nothing's Gonna Stop Us Now" in the final.

Vidoo competed to represent Denmark in the Eurovision Song Contest 2017 through the national final Dansk Melodi Grand Prix with her entry "Northern Lights", which did not advance to the super final in the selection held on 25 February 2017. "Northern Lights" was released internationally three days later. On 1 March 2017, Danish channel DR started broadcasting 4-episode docu-series Sada Vidoo chronicling Vidoo's life and career.

== Discography ==
=== Studio albums ===
Title	Album details
A Story with No End	Released: 11 August 2014 (DEN); Label: Target; Format: Digital download

=== Extended plays ===
Title	Album details
A Beautiful Lie	Released: 8 September 2017; Label: AGP Music; Format: Digital download

=== Singles ===
==== As lead artist ====
Title	Year	Album
Credited as Nicole
"Hide Away" (featuring Almo)	2001	Non-album singles
"I Don't Love You... No More" (featuring Jan W)	2001	Non-album singles
Credited as Sada Vidoo
"The Actress"	2014	A Story with No End
"China Doll"	2015	A Story with No End
"Love Is a Battlefield"	2015	A Story with No End
"Northern Lights"	2017	A Beautiful Lie
"Iconic"	2017	A Beautiful Lie

==== As featured artist ====
Title	Year	Album
Credited as Nicole
"Tell Me Why" (Morgan featuring Nicole)	2002	Non-album singles
"A Different World" (Misja Helsloot vs. Roland K. featuring Nicole)	2002	Non-album singles
Credited as Miss Nicole
"Kostbar" (Sami Krid featuring Miss Nicole)	2010	Non-album singles

==== Promotional singles ====
Title	Year	Album
Credited as Nicole
"Te Quiero" (featuring Me & My)	2002	Non-album single
