= Denmark in the Eurovision Song Contest 2017 =

- Eurovision Song Contest 2017
- Country: Denmark
- Selection process: Melodi Grand Prix 2017
- Selection date: 25 February 2017

Competing entry
- Song: "Where I Am"
- Artist: Anja
- Songwriters: Anja Nissen; Angel Tupai; Michael D'Arcy

Placement
- Semi-final result: Qualified (10th, 101 points)
- Final result: 20th, 77 points

Participation chronology

Denmark was represented at the Eurovision Song Contest 2017 with the song "Where I Am" written by Anja Nissen, Angel Tupai and Michael D'Arcy. The song was performed by Anja. The Danish broadcaster DR organised the national final Melodi Grand Prix 2017 in order to select the Danish entry for the 2017 contest in Kyiv, Ukraine. Ten songs competed in a televised show where "Where I Am" performed by Anja Nissen was the winner as decided upon through the combination of jury voting and public voting over two rounds.

Denmark was drawn to compete in the second semi-final of the Eurovision Song Contest which took place on 11 May 2017. Performing during the show in position 8, "Where I Am" was announced among the top 10 entries of the second semi-final and therefore qualified to compete in the final on 13 May. It was later revealed that Denmark placed tenth out of the 18 participating countries in the semi-final with 101 points. In the final, Denmark performed in position 10 and placed twentieth out of the 26 participating countries, scoring 77 points.

== Background ==
Prior to the 2017 contest, Denmark had participated in the Eurovision Song Contest forty-four times since its first entry in 1957. Denmark had won the contest, to this point, on three occasions: in 1963 with the song "Dansevise" performed by Grethe and Jørgen Ingmann, in 2000 with the song "Fly on the Wings of Love" performed by Olsen Brothers, and in 2013 with the song "Only Teardrops" performed by Emmelie de Forest. In the 2016 contest, "Soldiers of Love" performed by Lighthouse X failed to qualify Denmark to the final.

The Danish national broadcaster, DR, broadcasts the event within Denmark and organises the selection process for the nation's entry. DR confirmed their intentions to participate at the 2017 Eurovision Song Contest on 6 June 2016. Denmark has selected all of their Eurovision entries through the national final Dansk Melodi Grand Prix. Along with their participation confirmation, the broadcaster announced that Dansk Melodi Grand Prix 2017 would be organised in order to select Denmark's entry for the 2017 contest.

== Before Eurovision ==
=== Melodi Grand Prix 2017 ===
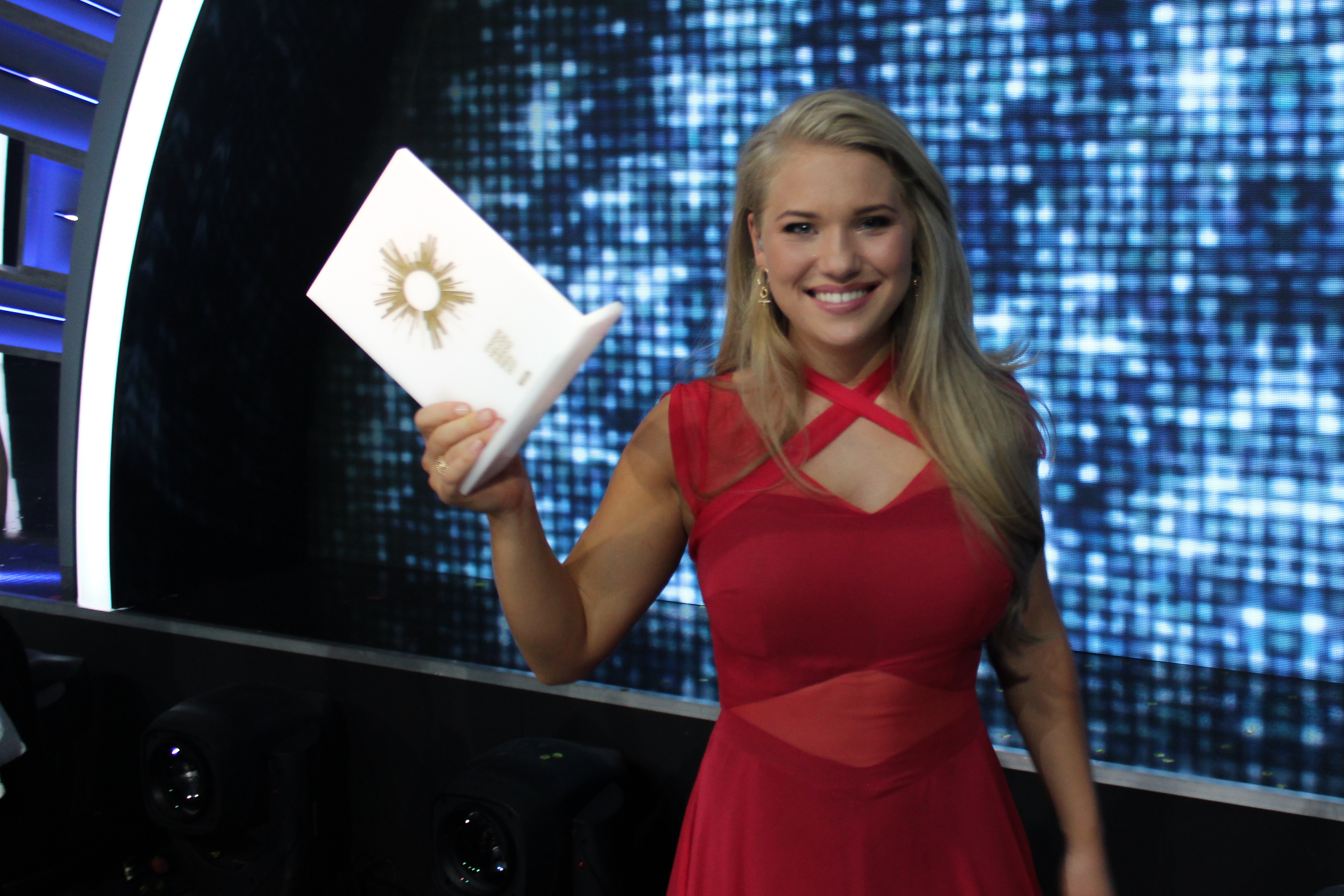
Anja Nissen at Dansk Melodi Grand Prix 2017

Melodi Grand Prix 2017 was the 47th edition of Dansk Melodi Grand Prix, the music competition that selects Denmark's entries for the Eurovision Song Contest. The event was held on 25 February 2017 at the Jyske Bank Boxen in Herning, hosted by Annette Heick and Johannes Nymark. The show was televised on DR1 as well as streamed online at the official DR website.

==== Format ====
Ten songs competed in one show where the winner was determined over two rounds of voting. In the first round, the top three songs based on the combination of votes from a public vote and a five-member jury panel qualified to the superfinal. In the superfinal, the winner was determined again by the votes of the jury and public. Viewers were able to vote via SMS or a mobile application specifically designed for the competition. Viewers using the app to cast a vote were provided with one free vote. The five-member jury panel was composed of five Danish Eurovision fans: Mogens Dalsgaard Myklebust, Mette Thorning Svendsen, Peter Hansen, Morten Kaiser and Søren Toft.

==== Competing entries ====
DR opened a submission period between 6 June 2016 and 5 September 2016 for artists and composers to submit their entries. The entertainment director for DR, Jan Lagermand Lundme, stated that the competition would seek out "good songs with a strong chorus, which have the potential to be a hit and that can get [Denmark] in the final of Eurovision". The broadcaster received a record breaking 1,115 entries during the submission period; the previous record was set in 2016 when the broadcaster received 982 entries. Music producers Cutfather and Jonas Schroeder, who had been affiliated with the Dansk Melodi Grand Prix since 2013, shortlisted 41 songs from the entries submitted to the broadcaster and a selection committee of 50 Dansk Melodi Grand Prix fans, television viewers and industry professionals selected five songs. An additional five participants were invited by Cutfather and Jonas Schroeder to compete. DR held a press meet and greet at the DR Byen in Copenhagen on 19 January 2017 where the competing artists and songs were announced and officially presented.

Artist	Song	Songwriter(s)
Anja	"Where I Am"	Anja Nissen, Angel Tupai, Michael D'Arcy
Anthony	"Smoke In My Eyes"	Kim Nowak-Zorde, Kasper Larsen, Hans Petersen, Ollie Marland, Phil Plested
Calling Mercury	"Big Little Lies"	Thomas Sardorf, Rune Braager, Martin Luke Brown
Ida Una	"One"	Peter Bjørnskov, Lene Dissing
Jeanette Bonde	"Hurricane"	Jeanette Bonde, Alexander Grandjean, Jeppe Pilgaard Ulrichsen, Nermin Harambasic
Johanna Beijbom	"A.S.A.P."	Peter Wallevik, Daniel Heløy Davidsen, Patrick Devine, Dimitri Stassos, Freja Jonsson Blomberg, Christian Fast
René Machon	"Warriors"	Astrid Cordes, Alexander Grandjean, Hans Petersen, Lars Andersen
Rikke Skytte	"Color My World"	Mads Løkkegaard, Joël Pagiël MacDonald, Mohamed Alitou, Laura Kloos
Sada Vidoo	"Northern Lights"	Christoffer Lauridsen, Andreas Öhrn, Alessandra Günthardt
Thomas Ring	"Vesterbro"	Thomas Ring Petersen

==== Final ====
The final took place on 25 February 2017. In the first round of voting the top three advanced to the superfinal based on the votes of a five-member jury (50%) and a public vote (50%). In the superfinal, the winner, "Where I Am" performed by Anja, was selected by the public and jury vote. In addition to the performances of the competing entries, Danish Eurovision Song Contest 2000 winners Olsen Brothers performed as the interval act.

Final – 25 February 2017
R/O	Artist	Song	Result
1	Ida Una	"One"	Advanced
2	Thomas Ring	"Vesterbro"	—N/a
3	Rikke Skytte	"Color My World"	—N/a
4	Anja	"Where I Am"	Advanced
5	Calling Mercury	"Big Little Lies"	—N/a
6	Anthony	"Smoke In My Eyes"	—N/a
7	René Machon	"Warriors"	—N/a
8	Sada Vidoo	"Northern Lights"	—N/a
9	Jeanette Bonde	"Hurricane"	—N/a
10	Johanna Beijbom	"A.S.A.P."	Advanced

Superfinal – 25 February 2017
R/O	Artist	Song	Percentage	Place
1	Ida Una	"One"	26%	2
2	Anja	"Where I Am"	64%	1
3	Johanna Beijbom	"A.S.A.P."	10%	3

=== Promotion ===
Anja Nissen made several appearances across Europe to specifically promote "Where I Am" as the Danish Eurovision entry. On 2 April, Anja Nissen performed during the London Eurovision Party, which was held at the Café de Paris venue in London, United Kingdom and hosted by Nicki French. Between 3 and 6 April, Nissen took part in promotional activities in Tel Aviv, Israel where she performed during the Israel Calling event held at the Ha'teatron venue. On 8 April, Nissen performed during the Eurovision in Concert event which was held at the Melkweg venue in Amsterdam, Netherlands and hosted by Cornald Maas and Selma Björnsdóttir.

== At Eurovision ==
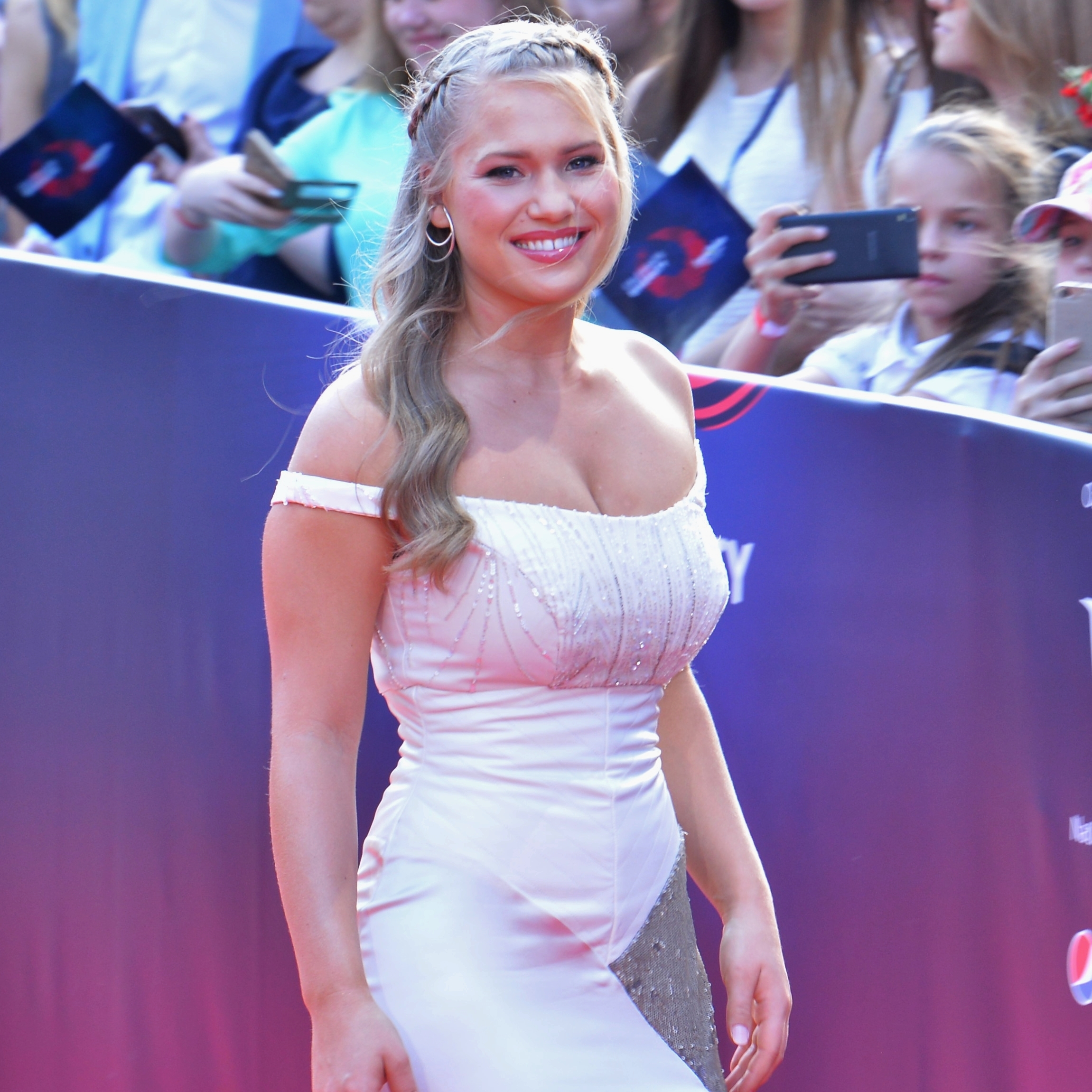
Anja Nissen at the 2017 Eurovision Red Carpet event

According to Eurovision rules, all nations with the exceptions of the host country and the "Big Five" (France, Germany, Italy, Spain and the United Kingdom) are required to qualify from one of two semi-finals in order to compete for the final; the top ten countries from each semi-final progress to the final. The European Broadcasting Union (EBU) split up the competing countries into six different pots based on voting patterns from previous contests, with countries with favourable voting histories put into the same pot. On 31 January 2017, a special allocation draw was held which placed each country into one of the two semi-finals, as well as which half of the show they would perform in. Denmark was placed into the second semi-final, to be held on 11 May 2017, and was scheduled to perform in the first half of the show.

Once all the competing songs for the 2017 contest had been released, the running order for the semi-finals was decided by the shows' producers rather than through another draw, so that similar songs were not placed next to each other. Originally, Denmark was set to perform in position 9, following the entry from Hungary and before the entry from Ireland. But after Russia was removed from the running order of the competition following their withdrawal from the contest, Denmark's position shifted to 8.

The two semi-finals and final were broadcast on DR1 with commentary by Ole Tøpholm. The Danish spokesperson, who announced the top 12-point score awarded by the Danish jury during the final, was Ulla Essendrop.

=== Semi-final ===
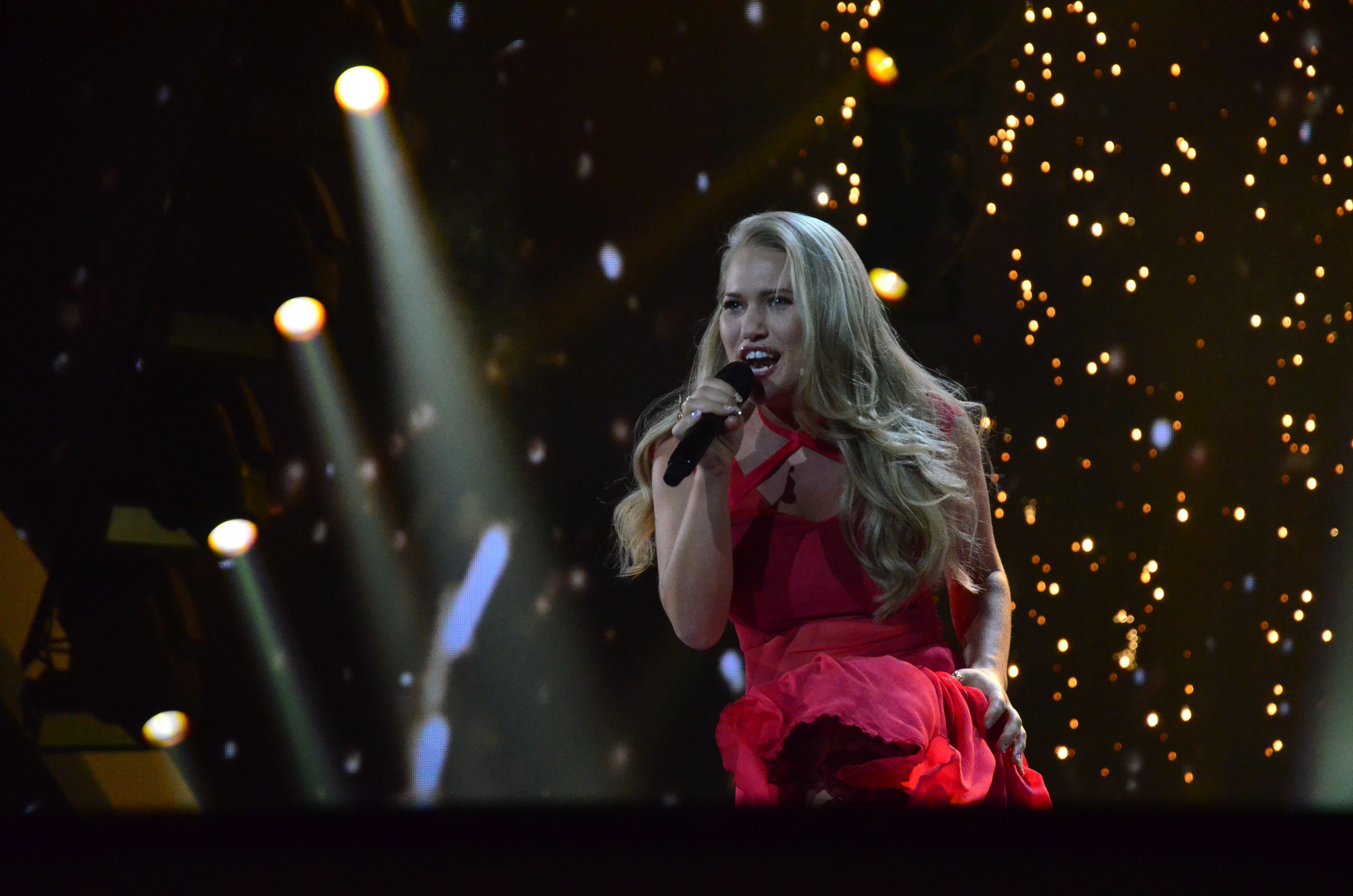
Anja Nissen during a rehearsal before the second semi-final

Anja Nissen took part in technical rehearsals on 2 April and 6 May, followed by dress rehearsals on 10 and 11 May. This included the jury show on 10 May where the professional juries of each country watched and voted on the competing entries.

The Danish performance featured Anja Nissen performing in a red dress which represented "purity, passion and vibrancy". The LED screens transitioned from pink, purple and blue colours to gold and Nissen finished her performance on her knees with a pyrotechnic fountain effect. Anja Nissen was joined by five off-stage backing vocalists: Andy Roda, Jasmin Gabay, Julie Lindell, Linda Andrews and Trille Palsgaard.

At the end of the show, Denmark was announced as having finished in the top 10 and subsequently qualifying for the grand final. It was later revealed that Denmark placed tenth in the semi-final, receiving a total of 101 points: 5 points from the televoting and 96 points from the juries.

=== Final ===
Shortly after the second semi-final, a winners' press conference was held for the ten qualifying countries. As part of this press conference, the qualifying artists took part in a draw to determine which half of the grand final they would subsequently participate in. This draw was done in the reverse order the countries appeared in the semi-final running order. Denmark was drawn to compete in the first half. Following this draw, the shows' producers decided upon the running order of the final, as they had done for the semi-finals. Denmark was subsequently placed to perform in position 10, following the entry from Italy and before the entry from Portugal.

Anja Nissen once again took part in dress rehearsals on 12 and 13 May before the final, including the jury final where the professional juries cast their final votes before the live show. Anja Nissen performed a repeat of her semi-final performance during the final on 14 May. Denmark placed twentieth in the final, scoring 77 points: 8 points from the televoting and 69 points from the juries.

=== Voting ===
Voting during the three shows involved each country awarding two sets of points from 1-8, 10 and 12: one from their professional jury and the other from televoting. Each nation's jury consisted of five music industry professionals who are citizens of the country they represent, with their names published before the contest to ensure transparency. This jury judged each entry based on: vocal capacity; the stage performance; the song's composition and originality; and the overall impression by the act. In addition, no member of a national jury was permitted to be related in any way to any of the competing acts in such a way that they cannot vote impartially and independently. The individual rankings of each jury member as well as the nation's televoting results were released shortly after the grand final.

Below is a breakdown of points awarded to Denmark and awarded by Denmark in the second semi-final and grand final of the contest, and the breakdown of the jury voting and televoting conducted during the two shows:

==== Points awarded to Denmark ====
Points awarded to Denmark (Semi-final 2)
Score	Televote	Jury
12 points		
10 points		Netherlands; Norway; Romania
8 points		Croatia; Estonia
7 points		Macedonia
6 points		Hungary; Lithuania
5 points		Malta; San Marino
4 points	Norway	Bulgaria; Israel; Serbia
3 points		Switzerland
2 points		Belarus; France
1 point	Netherlands	Germany; Ireland

Points awarded to Denmark (Final)
Score	Televote	Jury
12 points		
10 points		
8 points	Australia	Netherlands; Norway
7 points		Macedonia
6 points		Czech Republic
5 points		Australia; Estonia; Hungary; Romania; Sweden
4 points		Finland
3 points		Belarus; Croatia; Iceland
2 points		United Kingdom
1 point		

==== Points awarded by Denmark ====
Points awarded by Denmark (Semi-final 2)
Score	Televote	Jury
12 points	Bulgaria	Norway
10 points	Norway	Netherlands
8 points	Romania	Serbia
7 points	Netherlands	Austria
6 points	Israel	Bulgaria
5 points	Ireland	Israel
4 points	Hungary	Switzerland
3 points	Austria	Hungary
2 points	Estonia	Ireland
1 point	Switzerland	Estonia

Points awarded by Denmark (Final)
Score	Televote	Jury
12 points	Sweden	Sweden
10 points	Bulgaria	Portugal
8 points	Moldova	Australia
7 points	Norway	Austria
6 points	Belgium	Norway
5 points	Portugal	Netherlands
4 points	Romania	Bulgaria
3 points	Hungary	Moldova
2 points	Australia	Belgium
1 point	Netherlands	Armenia

==== Detailed voting results ====
The following members comprised the Danish jury:

- Anders Øhstrøm (jury chairperson) – composer, producer, singer; backing vocalist for Denmark in the 2005, 2008, 2009, and 2013 contests
- Cisilia Ismailova (Cisilia) – singer
- Morten Kærså – composer, singer, producer
- Sys Bjerre – singer-songwriter
- Monique Spartalis (Monique) – singer

Detailed voting results from Denmark (Semi-final 2)
R/O	Country	Jury							Televote	
R/O	Country	S. Bjerre	A. Øhrstrøm	Monique	M. Kærså	Cisilia	Rank	Points	Rank	Points
01	Serbia	4	3	2	2	12	3	8	17	
02	Austria	5	5	6	3	9	4	7	8	3
03	Macedonia	15	12	14	9	11	14		13	
04	Malta	3	14	7	13	13	11		16	
05	Romania	16	16	17	17	17	17		3	8
06	Netherlands	2	2	8	7	2	2	10	4	7
07	Hungary	7	13	11	6	7	8	3	7	4
08	Denmark									
09	Ireland	8	11	9	4	16	9	2	6	5
10	San Marino	17	15	16	16	10	16		14	
11	Croatia	12	10	10	10	14	13		11	
12	Norway	1	7	1	1	3	1	12	2	10
13	Switzerland	11	8	5	12	1	7	4	10	1
14	Belarus	9	9	12	5	15	12		12	
15	Bulgaria	10	1	4	11	5	5	6	1	12
16	Lithuania	14	17	13	15	6	15		15	
17	Estonia	13	4	15	8	8	10	1	9	2
18	Israel	6	6	3	14	4	6	5	5	6

Detailed voting results from Denmark (Final)
R/O	Country	Jury							Televote	
R/O	Country	S. Bjerre	A. Øhrstrøm	Monique	M. Kærså	Cisilia	Rank	Points	Rank	Points
01	Israel	15	19	6	18	2	12		17	
02	Poland	22	12	13	17	9	17		20	
03	Belarus	13	16	21	3	15	15		19	
04	Austria	12	6	8	4	3	4	7	12	
05	Armenia	18	7	19	11	4	10	1	25	
06	Netherlands	6	4	9	10	5	6	5	10	1
07	Moldova	7	15	12	9	8	8	3	3	8
08	Hungary	11	11	20	8	14	13		8	3
09	Italy	3	14	14	6	23	11		15	
10	Denmark									
11	Portugal	1	1	4	7	7	2	10	6	5
12	Azerbaijan	19	20	18	15	17	19		21	
13	Croatia	24	10	15	25	20	21		11	
14	Australia	9	3	2	12	6	3	8	9	2
15	Greece	21	21	22	13	18	22		23	
16	Spain	20	25	25	24	21	24		22	
17	Norway	4	13	5	1	11	5	6	4	7
18	United Kingdom	17	9	11	23	10	16		13	
19	Cyprus	14	17	7	16	13	14		14	
20	Romania	25	23	24	22	25	25		7	4
21	Germany	10	22	17	21	22	20		18	
22	Ukraine	23	24	23	20	24	23		24	
23	Belgium	2	8	10	14	19	9	2	5	6
24	Sweden	8	5	1	2	1	1	12	1	12
25	Bulgaria	16	2	3	5	12	7	4	2	10
26	France	5	18	16	19	16	18		16	
