= France in the Eurovision Song Contest 2017 =

- Eurovision Song Contest 2017
- Participating broadcaster: France Télévisions
- Country: France
- Selection process: Internal selection
- Announcement date: 9 February 2017

Competing entry
- Song: "Requiem"
- Artist: Alma
- Songwriters: Nazim Khaled; Alexandra Maquet

Placement
- Final result: 12th, 135 points

Participation chronology

France was represented at the Eurovision Song Contest 2017 with the song "Requiem" written by Nazim Khaled and Alma, and performed by Alma. The French broadcaster France Télévisions in collaboration with the television channel France 2 internally selected the French entry for the 2017 contest in Kyiv, Ukraine. "Requiem" was officially announced by France 2 as the French entry on 9 February 2017 and later the song was presented to the public as the contest entry on 11 March 2017.

As a member of the "Big Five", France automatically qualified to compete in the final of the Eurovision Song Contest. Performing as the closing entry during the show in position 26, France placed twelfth out of the 26 participating countries with 135 points.

== Background ==
Prior to the 2017 contest, France had participated in the Eurovision Song Contest fifty-nine times since its debut as one of seven countries to take part in 1956. France first won the contest in 1958 with "Dors, mon amour" performed by André Claveau. In the 1960s, they won three times, with "Tom Pillibi" performed by Jacqueline Boyer in 1960, "Un premier amour" performed by Isabelle Aubret in 1962, and "Un jour, un enfant" performed by Frida Boccara, who won in 1969 in a four-way tie with the Netherlands, Spain and the United Kingdom. France's fifth victory came in 1977, when Marie Myriam won with the song "L'oiseau et l'enfant". France have also finished second four times, with Paule Desjardins in 1957, Catherine Ferry in 1976, Joëlle Ursull in 1990 and Amina in 1991, who lost out to Sweden's Carola in a tie-break. In the 21st century, France has had less success, only making the top ten three times, with Natasha St-Pier finishing fourth in 2001, Sandrine François finishing fifth in 2002, Patricia Kaas finishing eighth in 2009 and Amir finishing sixth in 2016.

The French national broadcaster, France Télévisions, broadcasts the event within France and delegates the selection of the nation's entry to the television channel France 2. France 2 confirmed that France would participate in the 2017 Eurovision Song Contest on 16 May 2016. The French broadcaster had used both national finals and internal selection to choose the French entry in the past. The 2014 French entry was selected via a national final that featured three competing acts. In 2015 and 2016, the broadcaster opted to internally select the French entry, a procedure that was continued in order to select the 2017 entry.

== Before Eurovision ==
=== Internal selection ===
France 2 announced in on 13 September 2016 that the French entry for the 2017 Eurovision Song Contest would be selected internally. The broadcaster opened a submission period on 30 September 2016 in order for interested artists and songwriters to submit their proposals through an online submission form up until the deadline on 30 November 2016. Francophone performers 16 to 50 years of age and of any nationality were eligible for consideration, while songs were required to contain at least 80% French language lyrics with a free language allowance for the remaining lyrics. Artists and songwriters could apply individually or together, with artists that applied individually being possibly matched with a song submitted by a songwriter with or without an attached artist. At the closing of the deadline, the French broadcaster received around 300 submissions.

The artistic committee of France Télévisions reviewed the received submissions between 30 November 2016 and 10 March 2017, and on 9 February 2017, France 2 announced that the French entry for the Eurovision Song Contest 2017 would be "Requiem" performed by Alma. The song, performed entirely in French, was written by Alma and Nazim Khaled who co-wrote the French 2016 contest entry "J'ai cherché". "Requiem" was edited at the request of the French broadcaster and included additional lyrics in English. The entry was formally presented to the public on 11 March 2017 via the official Eurovision Song Contest YouTube channel.

It was discovered during the week of 17 February 2017 that the artist's song had been recorded and performed prior to the EBU's submission deadline, 1 September 2016, which therefore violated the EBU's song submission policy. Further research shows that Alma's song was performed at the end of January 2015. The French broadcaster later claimed that they were not in breach of the EBU's submission rules.

=== Promotion ===
Alma made several appearances across Europe to specifically promote "Requiem" as the French Eurovision entry. On 25 February, Alma performed "Requiem" during the final of the Ukrainian Eurovision national final. On 2 April, Alma performed during the London Eurovision Party, which was held at the Café de Paris venue in London, United Kingdom and hosted by Nicki French and Paddy O'Connell. On 8 April, Alma performed during the Eurovision in Concert event which was held at the Melkweg venue in Amsterdam, Netherlands and hosted by Cornald Maas and Selma Björnsdóttir. Between 3 and 6 April, Alma took part in promotional activities in Tel Aviv, Israel and performed during the Israel Calling event held at the Ha'teatron venue. On 15 April, Amir performed during the Eurovision-Spain Pre-Party, which was held at the La Riviera venue in Madrid, Spain.

== At Eurovision ==
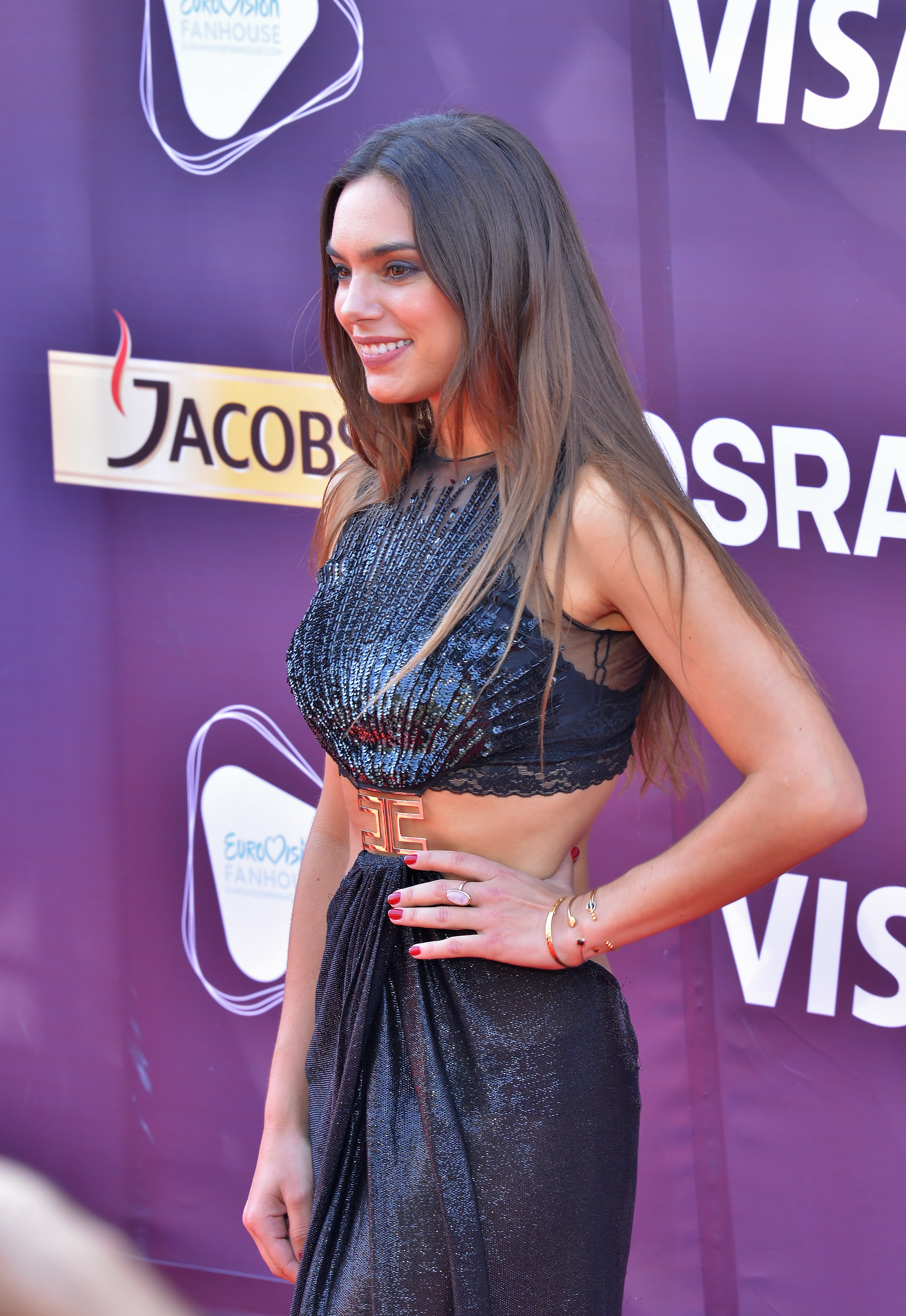
Alma at the Eurovision Song Contest opening ceremony

According to Eurovision rules, all nations with the exceptions of the host country and the "Big Five" (France, Germany, Italy, Spain and the United Kingdom) are required to qualify from one of two semi-finals in order to compete for the final; the top ten countries from each semi-final progress to the final. As a member of the "Big Five", France automatically qualified to compete in the final on 13 May 2017. In addition to their participation in the final, France is also required to broadcast and vote in one of the two semi-finals. During the semi-final allocation draw on 31 January 2017, France was assigned to broadcast and vote in the second semi-final on 11 May 2017.

In France, the two semi-finals was broadcast on France 4 with commentary by Marianne James and Jarry, while the final was broadcast on France 2 with commentary by Marianne James, Stéphane Bern and Amir Haddad who represented France in the 2016 Contest. The final was also broadcast in all CGR Cinemas across the country for the first time. The French spokesperson, who announced the top 12-point score awarded by the French jury during the final, was Élodie Gossuin.

=== Final ===
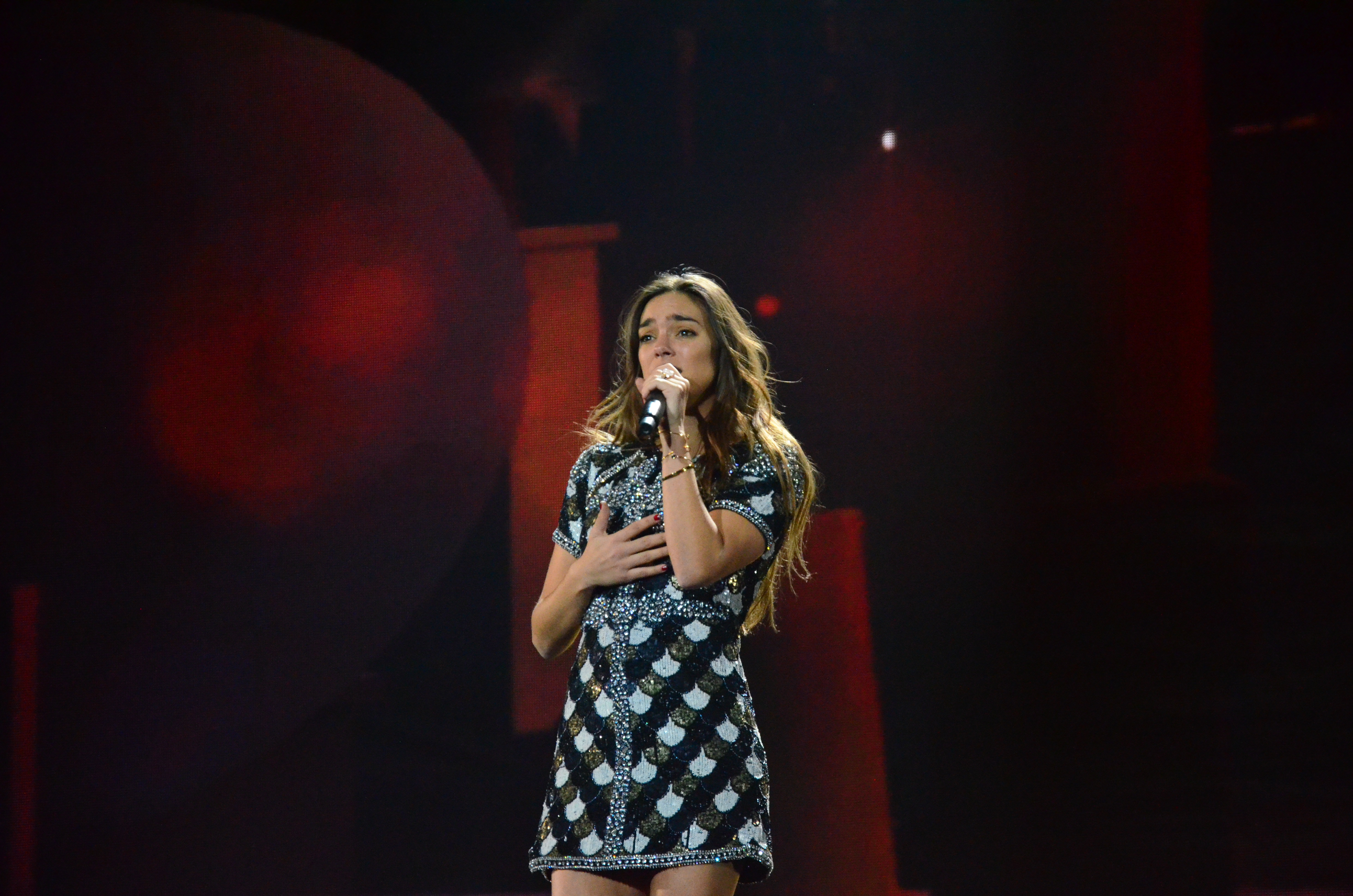
Alma during a rehearsal before the final

Alma took part in technical rehearsals on 5 and 7 May, followed by dress rehearsals on 10, 12 and 13 May. This included the semi-final jury show on 10 May where an extended clip of the French performance was filmed for broadcast during the live show on 11 May and the jury final on 12 May where the professional juries of each country watched and voted on the competing entries. After the technical rehearsals were held on 7 May, the "Big Five" countries and host nation Ukraine held a press conference. As part of this press conference, the artists took part in a draw to determine which half of the grand final they would subsequently participate in. France was drawn to compete in the second half. Following the conclusion of the second semi-final, the shows' producers decided upon the running order of the final. The running order for the semi-finals and final was decided by the shows' producers rather than through another draw, so that similar songs were not placed next to each other. France was subsequently placed to perform last in position 26, following the entry from Bulgaria.

The French performance featured Alma on stage alone dressed in a knee-length black dress with silver embroidery. The LED screens displayed animations of the Eiffel Tower and people in buildings with lighted windows, and a circle of lights surrounding Alma were shown on the stage floor. Alma was joined by three off-stage backing vocalists: Céline Arnaud, Michaël LeLong and Nathanaëlle Langlais. France placed twelfth in the final, scoring 135 points: 90 points from the televoting and 45 points from the juries.

=== Voting ===
Voting during the three shows involved each country awarding two sets of points from 1-8, 10 and 12: one from their professional jury and the other from televoting. Each nation's jury consisted of five music industry professionals who are citizens of the country they represent, with their names published before the contest to ensure transparency. This jury judged each entry based on: vocal capacity; the stage performance; the song's composition and originality; and the overall impression by the act. In addition, no member of a national jury was permitted to be related in any way to any of the competing acts in such a way that they cannot vote impartially and independently. The individual rankings of each jury member as well as the nation's televoting results were released shortly after the grand final.

Below is a breakdown of points awarded to France and awarded by France in the second semi-final and grand final of the contest, and the breakdown of the jury voting and televoting conducted during the two shows:

==== Points awarded to France ====
Points awarded to France (Final)
Score	Televote	Jury
12 points	Bulgaria	
10 points		
8 points	Armenia	
7 points		
6 points	Macedonia; Portugal; Ukraine	Israel; Italy
5 points	Azerbaijan; Moldova	Albania; Macedonia; Ukraine
4 points	Belarus; Greece; Israel; Romania	Malta; Portugal
3 points	Belgium; Croatia; Cyprus; Georgia; Spain	Armenia; Montenegro
2 points	Montenegro; Serbia; Switzerland	Cyprus
1 point	Albania; Estonia; Finland; Hungary; Italy	Belgium; Switzerland

==== Points awarded by France ====
Points awarded by France (Semi-final 2)
Score	Televote	Jury
12 points	Romania	Israel
10 points	Israel	Belarus
8 points	Bulgaria	Macedonia
7 points	Hungary	Bulgaria
6 points	Estonia	Malta
5 points	Serbia	Netherlands
4 points	Switzerland	Austria
3 points	Belarus	Norway
2 points	Croatia	Denmark
1 point	Ireland	Serbia

Points awarded by France (Final)
Score	Televote	Jury
12 points	Portugal	Portugal
10 points	Romania	Italy
8 points	Belgium	Sweden
7 points	Moldova	Norway
6 points	Armenia	Israel
5 points	Italy	Bulgaria
4 points	Bulgaria	Netherlands
3 points	Israel	United Kingdom
2 points	Hungary	Australia
1 point	Poland	Austria

==== Detailed voting results ====
The following members comprised the French jury:

- Antoine Gouiffes-Yan (jury chairperson) – marketing director
- Sonia Boraso (Enea) – singer
- Julien Gonçalves – music journalist
- Steven Bellery – music expert
- Hédia Charni – culture and music journalist, television host

Detailed voting results from France (Semi-final 2)
R/O	Country	Jury							Televote	
R/O	Country	A. Gouiffes-Yan	Enea	J. Gonçalves	S. Bellery	H. Charni	Rank	Points	Rank	Points
01	Serbia	4	9	13	11	6	10	1	6	5
02	Austria	8	8	5	3	10	7	4	13	
03	Macedonia	1	5	8	15	1	3	8	11	
04	Malta	2	11	2	14	3	5	6	18	
05	Romania	16	10	4	7	14	11		1	12
06	Netherlands	13	4	6	1	8	6	5	12	
07	Hungary	14	14	11	9	13	14		4	7
08	Denmark	9	12	3	2	11	9	2	15	
09	Ireland	10	16	17	13	12	16		10	1
10	San Marino	17	18	18	18	18	18		17	
11	Croatia	18	13	15	6	15	15		9	2
12	Norway	6	1	12	8	9	8	3	14	
13	Switzerland	12	6	7	12	16	12		7	4
14	Belarus	3	3	14	4	4	2	10	8	3
15	Bulgaria	11	7	1	5	7	4	7	3	8
16	Lithuania	15	17	16	16	17	17		16	
17	Estonia	7	15	10	17	5	13		5	6
18	Israel	5	2	9	10	2	1	12	2	10

Detailed voting results from France (Final)
R/O	Country	Jury							Televote	
R/O	Country	A. Gouiffes-Yan	Enea	J. Gonçalves	S. Bellery	H. Charni	Rank	Points	Rank	Points
01	Israel	2	13	5	7	15	5	6	8	3
02	Poland	22	10	21	20	19	21		10	1
03	Belarus	14	22	25	10	14	19		16	
04	Austria	13	14	13	9	5	10	1	24	
05	Armenia	9	6	22	19	6	13		5	6
06	Netherlands	11	11	2	1	20	7	4	14	
07	Moldova	20	24	20	12	10	20		4	7
08	Hungary	12	20	10	16	12	14		9	2
09	Italy	6	5	3	3	7	2	10	6	5
10	Denmark	21	19	6	4	11	12		25	
11	Portugal	1	7	1	5	2	1	12	1	12
12	Azerbaijan	25	21	19	6	22	22		17	
13	Croatia	18	23	23	17	21	24		12	
14	Australia	17	9	12	8	8	9	2	20	
15	Greece	15	18	16	22	23	23		15	
16	Spain	19	17	15	14	13	18		19	
17	Norway	4	3	14	15	3	4	7	23	
18	United Kingdom	8	2	4	23	16	8	3	22	
19	Cyprus	16	15	17	18	4	15		13	
20	Romania	23	16	9	13	17	17		2	10
21	Germany	3	4	18	24	24	16		21	
22	Ukraine	24	25	24	25	25	25		18	
23	Belgium	10	8	8	21	9	11		3	8
24	Sweden	5	12	11	2	1	3	8	11	
25	Bulgaria	7	1	7	11	18	6	5	7	4
26	France									
