= Latvia in the Eurovision Song Contest 2010 =

- Eurovision Song Contest 2010
- Participating broadcaster: Latvijas Televīzija (LTV)
- Country: Latvia
- Selection process: Eirodziesma 2010
- Selection date: 27 February 2010

Competing entry
- Song: "What For?"
- Artist: Aisha
- Songwriters: Jānis Lūsēns; Guntars Račs

Placement
- Semi-final result: Failed to qualify (17th)

Participation chronology

Latvia was represented at the Eurovision Song Contest 2010 with the song "What For?" written by Jānis Lūsēns and Guntars Račs, and performed by Aisha. The Latvian participating broadcaster, Latvijas Televīzija (LTV), organised the national final Eirodziesma 2010 in order to select its entry for the contest. Ten songs were selected to compete in the national final on 27 February 2010 where two rounds of voting by a public televote and a five-member jury panel selected "What For?" performed by Aisha as the winner.

Latvia was drawn to compete in the first semi-final of the Eurovision Song Contest which took place on 25 May 2010. Performing during the show in position 6, "What For?" was not announced among the top 10 entries of the first semi-final and therefore did not qualify to compete in the final. It was later revealed that Latvia placed seventeenth (last) out of the 17 participating countries in the semi-final with 11 points.

== Background ==
Prior to the 2010 contest, Latvijas Televīzija (LTV) had participated in the Eurovision Song Contest representing Latvia ten times since its first entry in 2000. Latvia won the contest once in 2002 with the song "I Wanna" performed by Marie N. Following the introduction of semi-finals for the 2004, Latvia was able to qualify to compete in the final between 2005 and 2008. However, in 2009, the nation had failed to qualify to the final with their entry "Probka" performed by Intars Busulis.

As part of its duties as participating broadcaster, LTV organises the selection of its entry in the Eurovision Song Contest and broadcasts the event in the country. Despite financial instabilities that could have resulted in a withdrawal, LTV confirmed its intentions to participate at the 2010 contest on 15 December 2009 after securing sponsorships and a cooperation agreement with the Ventspils City Council. LTV has selected its entries for the Eurovision Song Contest through a national final. Since their debut in 2000, it had organised the selection show Eirodziesma. Along with its participation confirmation, the broadcaster announced that they would organise Eirodziesma 2010 in order to select its entry for the 2010 contest.

== Before Eurovision ==
=== Eirodziesma 2010 ===
Eirodziesma 2010 was the eleventh edition of Eirodziesma, the music competition that selects Latvia's entries for the Eurovision Song Contest. The competition consisted of a final on 27 February 2010 that took place at the Jūras vārti Theatre in Ventspils and hosted by Uģis Joksts and Kristīne Virsnīte. The show was broadcast on LTV1 as well as online via the broadcaster's official website ltv.lv and the official Eurovision Song Contest website eurovision.tv.

==== Format ====
The format of the competition consisted of one show held on 27 February 2010. The final featured ten competing entries from which the Latvian entry for Oslo was selected over two rounds of voting: the first round selected the top three songs and the second round (superfinal) selected the winner. Results both rounds were determined by the 50/50 combination of votes from a jury panel and a public televote. Both the jury and public assigned points from 1 to 10 based on ranking in the first round of the final, with the first place receiving one point and last place receiving ten points. In the superfinal, the jury and public both assigned points from 1 to 3 also based on ranking with the first place receiving one point and last place receiving three points. Ties were decided in favour of the entries that received higher points from the public. Viewers were able to vote via telephone up to five times or via SMS with a single SMS counting as five votes.

The jury panel that voted in the competition consisted of:

- Uldis Marhilēvičs – composer
- Daiga Mazvērsīte – musicologist
- Niks Matvejevs – singer
- Atis Volfs – DJ at Pieci.lv
- Intars Busulis – singer, trombonist, radio host and 2009 Latvian Eurovision entrant

==== Competing entries ====
Artists and songwriters were able to submit their entries to the broadcaster between 23 December 2009 and 15 January 2010. All artists and songwriters were required to have Latvian citizenship or residency unlike in previous years. 79 entries were submitted at the conclusion of the submission period. A jury panel appointed by LTV evaluated the submitted songs and selected ten entries for the competition. The jury panel consisted of Uldis Marhilēvičs (composer), Niks Matvejevs (singer), Kārlis Lācis (composer), Ance Krauze (singer and vocal teacher), Marija Naumova (Latvian Eurovision Song Contest 2002 winner), Artis Volfs (DJ at Pieci.lv), members of the LTV Eurovision team and creators of the LTV7 programme SeMS. The ten competing artists and songs were announced during a press conference on 22 January 2010. Among the artists was Lauris Reiniks who represented Latvia in the Eurovision Song Contest 2003 as part of the group F.L.Y.

Artist	Song	Songwriter(s)
Aisha	"What For?"	Jānis Lūsēns, Guntars Račs
Dons	"My Religion Is Freedom"	Zigmars Liepiņš, Jānis Liepiņš, Nikita Kellermans
H2O	"When I Close My Eyes"	Staņislavs Judins, Jānis Strapcāns
Ivo Grīsniņš Grīslis	"Because I Love You"	Ingars Viļums
Konike	"Digi digi dong"	Edijs Šnipke, Andris Konters
Kristīna Zaharova	"Snow in July"	Jānis Strazds, Guntars Račs
Kristīne Kārkla-Puriņa	"Rišti räšti"	Raimonds Tiguls, Valts Ernštreits
Lauris Reiniks	"Your Morning Lullaby"	Lauris Reiniks
PeR	"Like a Mouse"	Mārtiņš Freimanis
Triānas parks	"Lullaby for My Dreammate (Diamond Lullaby)"	Agnese Rakovska

==== Final ====
The final took place on 27 February 2010. The running order draw for the ten competing entries took place on 3 February 2010 during the LTV7 programme SeMS. The winner was selected over two rounds of voting. In the first round, three songs advanced to the second round, the superfinal, based on the combination of votes from a jury panel and a public televote. In the superfinal, "What For?" performed by Aisha was selected as the winner through the combination of votes from the jury and public. Aisha and Dons were tied at 3 points each but since Aisha received the most votes from the public she was declared the winner. In addition to the performances of the competing songs, the show featured guest performances by the band Lady's Sweet, singer Roberts Pētersons, 2005 Latvian Eurovision entrant Kārlis Būmeisters and 2010 Swiss Eurovision entrant Michael von der Heide.

Final – 27 February 2010
R/O	Artist	Song	Jury	Televote	Total	Place
1	PeR	"Like a Mouse"	10	10	20	10
2	Triānas parks	"Lullaby for My Dreammate (Diamond Lullaby)"	3	8	11	6
3	Aisha	"What For?"	2	1	3	1
4	Lauris Reiniks	"Your Morning Lullaby"	7	4	11	4
5	Dons	"My Religion Is Freedom"	1	2	3	2
6	Konike	"Digi digi dong"	6	5	11	5
7	H2O	"When I Close My Eyes"	8	9	17	9
8	Kristīne Kārkla-Puriņa	"Rišti räšti"	5	7	12	8
9	Ivo Grīsniņš Grīslis	"Because I Love You"	4	6	10	3
10	Kristīna Zaharova	"Snow in July"	9	3	12	7

Detailed Jury Votes
R/O	Song	Juror					Total	Points
R/O	Song	1	2	3	4	5	Total	Points
1	"Like a Mouse"	10	9	7	8	9	43	10
2	"Lullaby for My Dreammate (Diamond Lullaby)"	3	3	3	4	1	14	3
3	"What For?"	2	2	2	1	4	11	2
4	"Your Morning Lullaby"	5	7	9	9	8	38	7
5	"My Religion Is Freedom"	1	1	1	2	2	7	1
6	"Digi digi dong"	7	8	6	3	7	31	6
7	"When I Close My Eyes"	9	6	8	6	10	39	8
8	"Rišti räšti"	4	4	5	7	6	26	5
9	"Because I Love You"	6	5	4	5	3	23	4
10	"Snow in July"	8	10	10	10	5	43	9

Superfinal – 27 February 2010
R/O	Artist	Song	Jury	Televote	Total	Place
1	Dons	"My Religion Is Freedom"	1	2	3	2
2	Ivo Grīsniņš-Grīslis	"Because I Love You"	3	3	6	3
3	Aisha	"What For?"	2	1	3	1

Detailed Jury Votes
R/O	Song	Juror					Total	Points
R/O	Song	1	2	3	4	5	Total	Points
1	"My Religion Is Freedom"	2	2	1	1	2	8	1
2	"Because I Love You"	3	3	3	3	1	13	3
3	"What For?"	1	1	2	2	3	9	2

=== Promotion ===
Aisha specifically promoted "What For?" as the Latvian Eurovision entry on 24 April 2010 by performing during the Eurovision in Concert event which was held at the Lexion venue in Zaanstad, Netherlands on 24 April and hosted by Cornald Maas and Marga Bult.

== At Eurovision ==
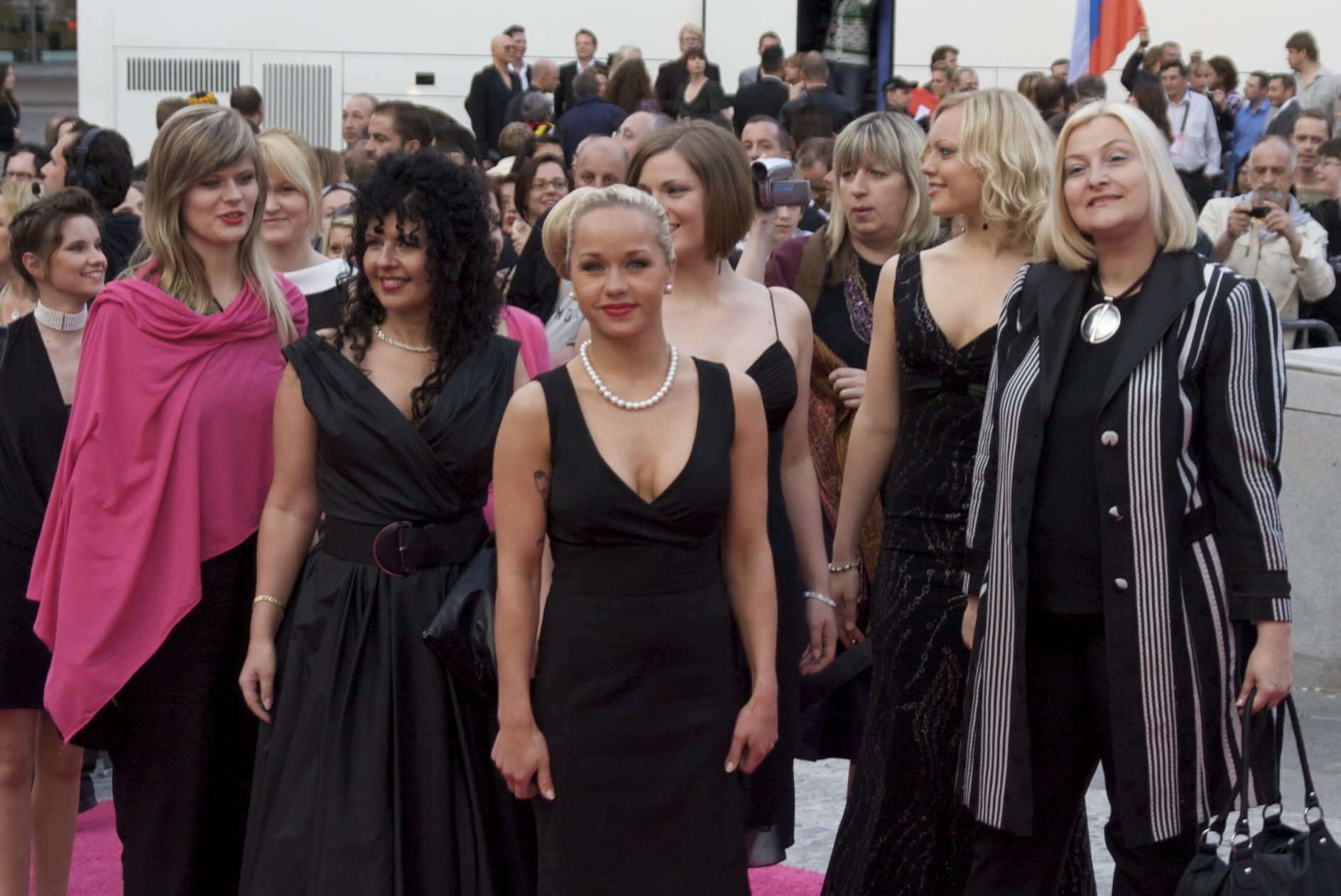
Aisha at the Eurovision Opening Party in Oslo

According to Eurovision rules, all nations with the exceptions of the host country and the "Big Four" (France, Germany, Spain and the United Kingdom) are required to qualify from one of two semi-finals in order to compete for the final; the top ten countries from each semi-final progress to the final. The European Broadcasting Union (EBU) split up the competing countries into six different pots based on voting patterns from previous contests, with countries with favourable voting histories put into the same pot. On 7 February 2010, a special allocation draw was held which placed each country into one of the two semi-finals, as well as which half of the show they would perform in. Latvia was placed into the first semi-final, to be held on 25 May 2010, and was scheduled to perform in the first half of the show. The running order for the semi-finals was decided through another draw on 23 March 2010 and Latvia was set to perform in position 7, following the entry from Finland and before the entry from Serbia

The two semi-finals and the final were broadcast in Latvia on LTV1 with all shows featuring commentary by Kārlis Streips. The Latvian spokesperson, who announced the Latvian votes during the final, was Kārlis Būmeisters.

=== Semi-final ===
Aisha took part in technical rehearsals on 16 and 20 May, followed by dress rehearsals on 24 and 25 May. This included the jury show on 24 May where the professional juries of each country watched and voted on the competing entries. The Latvian performance featured Aisha performing on stage in a champagne outfit. The stage featured a large half-circle of blue-grey draperies against a dark setting as well as the use of smoke effects and a wind machine. Aisha was joined on stage by four backing vocalists: Katrīna Cīrule, Lāsma Ivansone, Madara Kačoreka and Raili Orrava.

At the end of the show, Latvia was not announced among the top 10 entries in the first semi-final and therefore failed to qualify to compete in the final. It was later revealed that Latvia placed seventeenth (last) in the semi-final, receiving a total of 11 points.

=== Voting ===
Voting during the three shows consisted of 50 percent public televoting and 50 percent from a jury deliberation. The jury consisted of five music industry professionals who were citizens of the country they represent, with their names published before the contest to ensure transparency. This jury was asked to judge each contestant based on: vocal capacity; the stage performance; the song's composition and originality; and the overall impression by the act. In addition, no member of a national jury could be related in any way to any of the competing acts in such a way that they cannot vote impartially and independently. The individual rankings of each jury member were released shortly after the grand final.

Following the release of the full split voting by the EBU after the conclusion of the competition, it was revealed that Latvia had placed seventeenth (last) with both the public televote and the jury vote in the first semi-final. In the public vote, Latvia scored 12 points, while with the jury vote, Latvia scored 15 points.

Below is a breakdown of points awarded to Latvia and awarded by Latvia in the first semi-final and grand final of the contest. The nation awarded its 12 points to Estonia in the semi-final and to Germany in the final of the contest.

==== Points awarded to Latvia ====
Points awarded to Latvia (Semi-final 1)
Score	Country
12 points	
10 points	
8 points	
7 points	
6 points	Estonia
5 points	Finland
4 points	
3 points	
2 points	
1 point	

==== Points awarded by Latvia ====
Points awarded by Latvia (Semi-final 1)
Score	Country
12 points	Estonia
10 points	Russia
8 points	Belgium
7 points	Portugal
6 points	Finland
5 points	Belarus
4 points	Poland
3 points	Serbia
2 points	Iceland
1 point	Malta

Points awarded by Latvia (Final)
Score	Country
12 points	Germany
10 points	Denmark
8 points	Russia
7 points	Ukraine
6 points	Portugal
5 points	Spain
4 points	Belgium
3 points	Romania
2 points	Azerbaijan
1 point	Armenia
