= Latvia in the Eurovision Song Contest 2009 =

- Eurovision Song Contest 2009
- Participating broadcaster: Latvijas Televīzija (LTV)
- Country: Latvia
- Selection process: Eirodziesma 2009
- Selection date: 28 February 2009

Competing entry
- Song: "Probka"
- Artist: Intars Busulis
- Songwriters: Kārlis Lācis; Jānis Elsbergs; Sergejs Timofejevs

Placement
- Semi-final result: Failed to qualify (19th)

Participation chronology

Latvia was represented at the Eurovision Song Contest 2009 with the song "Probka", written by Kārlis Lācis, Jānis Elsbergs and Sergejs Timofejevs, and performed by Intars Busulis. The Latvian participating broadcaster, Latvijas Televīzija (LTV), organised the national final Eirodziesma 2009 in order to select its entry for contest. Twenty songs were selected to compete in the national final, which consisted of two shows: a semi-final and a final. In the semi-final, ten entries were selected to advance based on a public vote. Ten songs ultimately qualified to compete in the final on 28 February 2009 where two rounds of voting by the public and a five-member jury panel selected "Sastrēgums" performed by Intars Busulis as the winner. The song was later translated from Latvian to Russian for the Eurovision Song Contest and was titled "Probka".

Latvia was drawn to compete in the second semi-final of the Eurovision Song Contest which took place on 14 May 2009. Performing during the show in position 3, "Probka" was not among the 10 qualifying entries of the second semi-final and therefore did not qualify to compete in the final. It was later revealed that Latvia placed nineteenth (last) out of the 19 participating countries in the semi-final with 7 points.

== Background ==
Prior to the 2009 contest, Latvijas Televīzija (LTV) had participated in the Eurovision Song Contest representing Latvia nine times since its first entry in 2000. Latvia won the contest once in 2002 with the song "I Wanna" performed by Marie N. Following the introduction of semi-finals for the 2004, Latvia was able to qualify to compete in the final between 2005 and 2008 including with their 2008 entry "Wolves of the Sea" performed by Pirates of the Sea. Despite a possible boycott to be held between the three Baltic states due to the Russian participation in the 2008 South Ossetia war in Georgia as announced by Estonian Minister of Culture Laine Jänes, LTV confirmed its intention to participate at the 2009 contest on 26 August 2008. The broadcaster has selected its entries for the Eurovision Song Contest through a national final. Since their debut in 2000, LTV had organised the selection show Eirodziesma and on 3 November 2008, the broadcaster announced that they would organise Eirodziesma 2009 in order to select its entry for the 2009 contest.

On 17 December 2008, it was revealed that LTV had requested to the European Broadcasting Union (EBU) their withdrawal from the 2009 contest due to budget cuts of 2 million Lats (over €3 million) by the Latvian government that led to the forced cancellation of planned shows for 2009 including Eirodziesma 2009. After talks between the two parties for a way that the nation could participate in the contest, LTV confirmed their withdrawal on 20 December 2008 without being penalised for withdrawing three days after the deadline. However, the EBU announced that Latvia would still participate on 12 January 2009 after a lowered participation fee was granted to LTV, while LTV confirmed the continued organisation of Eirodziesma 2009 on 23 January 2009 after securing sponsorships and a cooperation agreement with the Ventspils Development Agency and Ventspils City Council.

== Before Eurovision ==
=== Eirodziesma 2009 ===
Eirodziesma 2009 was the tenth edition of Eirodziesma, the music competition that selects Latvia's entries for the Eurovision Song Contest. The competition commenced with the semi-final on 27 February 2009 and concluded with a final on 28 February 2009. All shows in the competition took place at the Olympic Center in Ventspils, hosted by Uģis Joksts and Kristīne Virsnīte and broadcast on LTV1 as well as online via the broadcaster's official Eurovision Song Contest website eirovizija.lv.

==== Format ====
The format of the competition consisted of two shows: a semi-final and a final. The semi-final, held on 27 February 2009, featured twenty competing entries facing a public vote where the top ten advanced to the final. The final, held on 28 February 2009, selected the Latvian entry for Moscow from the remaining ten entries over two rounds of voting: the first round selected the top three songs as determined by the 50/50 combination of votes from a jury panel and a public vote, and the second round (superfinal) selected the winner exclusively by a public vote. The initial format was to broadcast five shows: three semi-finals each featuring nine competing entries from which three would advance directly to the final, a Second Chance round from which one would proceed to the final. However, such plans was later cancelled. Both the jury and public vote assigned points from 1 to 10 based on ranking in the first round of the final, with the first place receiving one point and last place receiving ten points. Viewers were able to vote via telephone up to five times or via SMS with a single SMS counting as five votes.

==== Competing entries ====
Artists and songwriters were able to submit their entries to the broadcaster between 3 November 2008 and 30 November 2008. All artists and songwriters were required to have Latvian citizenship or residency, however foreign collaborations were allowed as long as one-thirds of the composition were by Latvian songwriters. 108 entries were submitted at the conclusion of the submission period. A jury panel appointed by LTV evaluated the submitted songs and selected twenty-one entries for the competition. The jury panel consisted of Daina Markova (musicologist and content editor at LTV), Raimonds Macats (musician and composer), Aivars Hermanis (musician and producer), Ance Krauze (singer and vocal teacher), Dace Pūce (director and producer), Jegors Jerohomovičs (music critic and cultural journalist), Edmunds Kaševskis (producer at Radio SWH) and members of the LTV Eurovision team: Iveta Lepeško, Zita Kaminska, Arvīds Babris, Baiba Saleniece and Uldis Salenieks. The twenty-one competing artists and songs were announced on 9 December 2008. Among the artists was Valters Frīdenbergs who represented Latvia in the Eurovision Song Contest 2005 as part of Walters and Kazha.

On 12 January 2009, Kristīna Zaharova withdrew "I Wish I Could Pretend" from the competition in favour of the song competing in the 2009 Irish Eurovision national final. On 13 February 2009, LTV announced that the song "In Love We Trust" would be performed by Policistas instead of Aisha, Ella and Olga, while the song "Have to Say Goodbye" would be performed by Astra Dreimane instead of Madara Celma.

Artist	Song	Songwriter(s)
Aisha feat. G-Point	"Hey, Hey, Hey, Hey"	Kjell Jennstig, Leif Golkuhl
Astra Dreimane	"Have to Say Goodbye"	Madara Celma
Camillas	"Time Goes"	Romāns Falkenšteins, Ņina Kovaiko
Dace and Frīdis	"Running Around"	Mārtiņš Freimanis
Edijs Šnipke	"Make My Day"	Edijs Šnipke
Fidji	"Don't Want to Say Goodbye"	Katrīna Tene, Tarmo Keränen
Ginta Ēķe	"Be Yourself"	Kristaps Krievkalns, Ginta Ēķe
Girts Zebuliņš	"Place to Be"	Andris Barons, Brita Barone, Diāna Dubrovska
Intars Busulis	"Sastrēgums"	Kārlis Lācis, Jānis Elsbergs
Iveta Baumane and Ivo Grīsniņš-Grīslis	"Tic Tac"	Ingars Viļums
Johnny Salamander	"Party"	Jānis Gūža, Meldra Gūža
Ketta	"Without You"	Pavel Murashov
~~Kristīna Zaharova~~	~~"I Wish I Could Pretend"~~	~~Lauris Reiniks, Gordon Pogoda~~
Kristīna Zaharova and Annija Putniņa	"Angel of Mine"	Mārtiņš Freimanis
Miks Dukurs	"Aizejot"	Edijs Dukurs, Miks Dukurs
Natālija Tumševica	"Dynamite"	Mikael Erlandsson
Policistas	"In Love We Trust"	Tomass Kleins, Guntars Račs
Sabīne Berezina feat. PeR	"Bye, Bye"	Markus Riva
Simply 4	"When the Sun Is Going Down"	Artūrs Palkevičs, Leonīds Jevsejevs, Sergejs Ivanovs
Triānas parks	"Call Me Any Time You Need a Problem"	Aivars Rakovskis, Agnese Rakovska
Valters Frīdenbergs	"For a Better Tomorrow"	Valters Frīdenbergs

==== Semi-final ====
The semi-final took place on 27 February 2009. Twenty acts competed and the ten entries with the highest number of votes from the public qualified to the final.

Semi-final – 27 February 2009
R/O	Artist	Song	Televote	Place
1	Camillas	"Time Goes"	1,434	8
2	Dace and Frīdis	"Running Around"	603	15
3	Girts Zebuliņš	"Place to Be"	1,239	12
4	Johnny Salamander	"Party"	399	19
5	Miks Dukurs	"Aizejot"	533	16
6	Iveta Baumane and Ivo Grīsniņš-Grīslis	"Tic Tac"	1,510	7
7	Ginta Ēķe	"Be Yourself"	448	18
8	Natālija Tumševica	"Dynamite"	1,601	5
9	Triānas parks	"Call Me Any Time You Need a Problem"	1,427	9
10	Intars Busulis	"Sastrēgums"	1,730	4
11	Kristīna Zaharova and Annija Putniņa	"Angel of Mine"	2,935	1
12	Astra Dreimane	"Have to Say Goodbye"	316	20
13	Edijs Šnipke	"Make My Day"	719	14
14	Ketta	"Without You"	1,415	10
15	Policistas	"In Love We Trust"	1,401	11
16	Fidji	"Don't Want to Say Goodbye"	517	17
17	Aisha feat. G-Point	"Hey, Hey, Hey, Hey"	2,564	3
18	Simply 4	"When the Sun Is Going Down"	2,704	2
19	Sabīne Berezina feat. PeR	"Bye, Bye"	1,559	6
20	Valters Frīdenbergs	"For a Better Tomorrow"	856	13

==== Final ====
The final took place on 28 February 2009. The ten entries that qualified from the semi-final competed and the winner was selected over two rounds of voting. In the first round, three songs advanced to the second round, the superfinal, based on the combination of votes from a jury panel and the Latvian public. In the superfinal, the song with the highest number of votes from the public, "Sastrēgums" performed by Intars Busulis, was declared the winner. The jury panel that voted in the final consisted of Daiga Mazvērsīte (musicologist), Jānis Lūsēns (composer), Aivars Hermanis (musician and producer), Jolanta Gulbe (singer and vocal teacher) and Edmunds Kaševskis (producer at Radio SWH).

In addition to the performances of the competing entries, guest performers included participant Kristīna Zaharova, 2004 Latvian Eurovision entrant Fomins and Kleins, 2008 Latvian Eurovision entrant Pirates of the Sea, 2009 Lithuanian Eurovision entrant Sasha Son and 2009 Polish Eurovision entrant Lidia Kopania.

Final – 28 February 2009
R/O	Artist	Song	Jury		Televote		Total	Place
R/O	Artist	Song	Votes	Points	Votes	Points	Total	Place
1	Simply 4	"When the Sun Is Going Down"	47	9	5,351	2	11	7
2	Aisha feat. G-Point	"Hey, Hey, Hey, Hey"	25	6	4,781	4	10	6
3	Kristīna Zaharova and Annija Putniņa	"Angel of Mine"	33	7	6,127	1	8	2
4	Sabīne Berezina feat. PeR	"Bye, Bye"	39	8	1,998	10	18	9
5	Iveta Baumane and Ivo Grīsniņš-Grīslis	"Tic Tac"	48	10	3,310	8	18	10
6	Intars Busulis	"Sastrēgums"	6	1	4,871	3	4	1
7	Natālija Tumševica	"Dynamite"	14	2	3,376	7	9	3
8	Camillas	"Time Goes"	19	3	2,431	9	12	8
9	Triānas parks	"Call Me Any Time You Need a Problem"	20	4	3,846	6	10	4
10	Ketta	"Without You"	24	5	4,160	5	10	5

Detailed Jury Votes
R/O	Song	Juror					Total
R/O	Song	1	2	3	4	5	Total
1	"When the Sun Is Going Down"	9	10	10	9	9	47
2	"Hey Hey Hey Hey"	5	5	6	6	3	25
3	"Angel of Mine"	8	6	7	5	7	23
4	"Bye, Bye"	7	8	8	8	8	33
5	"Tic Tac"	10	9	9	10	10	48
6	"Sastrēgums"	1	1	2	1	1	6
7	"Dynamite"	3	4	1	4	2	14
8	"Time Goes"	4	2	5	3	5	19
9	"Call Me Any Time You Need a Problem"	6	3	3	2	6	20
10	"Without You"	2	7	4	7	4	24

Superfinal – 28 February 2009
R/O	Artist	Song	Televote	Place
1	Intars Busulis	"Sastrēgums"	21,027	1
2	Natālija Tumševica	"Dynamite"	5,662	3
3	Kristīna Zaharova and Annija Putniņa	"Angel of Mine"	19,679	2

==== Ratings ====
Viewing figures by show
Show	Air date	Viewing figures		Ref.
Show	Air date	Nominal	Share	Ref.
Semi-final	27 February 2009	222,000	10.2%	
Final	28 February 2009	306,000	14%	

=== Preparation ===
On 1 March, it was announced that "Sastrēgums" would be translated from Latvian to Russian for the Eurovision Song Contest, titled "Probka" with lyrics by Sergejs Timofejevs. The official music video for the song was released on 24 March.

== At Eurovision ==
According to Eurovision rules, all nations with the exceptions of the host country and the "Big Four" (France, Germany, Spain and the United Kingdom) are required to qualify from one of two semi-finals in order to compete for the final; the top nine songs from each semi-final as determined by televoting progress to the final, and a tenth was determined by back-up juries. The European Broadcasting Union (EBU) split up the competing countries into six different pots based on voting patterns from previous contests, with countries with favourable voting histories put into the same pot. On 30 January 2009, a special allocation draw was held which placed each country into one of the two semi-finals. Latvia was placed into the second semi-final, to be held on 14 May 2009. The running order for the semi-finals was decided through another draw on 16 March 2009 and Latvia was set to perform in position 3, following the entry from Ireland and before the entry from Serbia.

The two semi-finals and the final were broadcast in Latvia on LTV1 with all shows featuring commentary by Kārlis Streips. The Latvian spokesperson, who announced the Latvian votes during the final, was Roberto Meloni.

=== Semi-final ===
Intars Busulis took part in technical rehearsals on 5 and 8 May, followed by dress rehearsals on 13 and 14 May. The Latvian performance featured Intars Busulis wearing a blue jacket with circular badges, a blue shirt and a red tie, joined on stage by a keyboard player, two guitarists and two backing vocalists. Busulis interacted with the other performers during the performance, while the LED screens displayed the silhouette of a city and a road signpost that mentioned the names of several European cities: Stockholm, Brussels, Riga, Rome, Berlin, Oslo and Yerevan. The director for the Latvian performance was Viktors Runtulis. The musicians that joined Intars Busulis were: Gints Pabērzs, the co-composer of "Probka" Kārlis Lācis and Kaspars Zemītis, while the two backing vocalists were Jolanta Strikaite and Vineta Elksne.

At the end of the show, Latvia was not announced among the top 10 entries in the second semi-final and therefore failed to qualify to compete in the final. It was later revealed that Latvia placed nineteenth (last) in the semi-final, receiving a total of 7 points.

=== Voting ===
Below is a breakdown of points awarded to Latvia and awarded by Latvia in the second semi-final and grand final of the contest. The nation awarded its 12 points to Estonia in the semi-final and to Norway in the final of the contest.

==== Points awarded to Latvia ====
Points awarded to Latvia (Semi-final 2)
Score	Country
12 points	
10 points	
8 points	
7 points	
6 points	Lithuania
5 points	
4 points	
3 points	
2 points	
1 point	Estonia

==== Points awarded by Latvia ====
Points awarded by Latvia (Semi-final 2)
Score	Country
12 points	Estonia
10 points	Norway
8 points	Azerbaijan
7 points	Lithuania
6 points	Ukraine
5 points	Ireland
4 points	Greece
3 points	Denmark
2 points	Moldova
1 point	Cyprus

Points awarded by Latvia (Final)
Score	Country
12 points	Norway
10 points	Estonia
8 points	Iceland
7 points	Lithuania
6 points	Russia
5 points	France
4 points	Azerbaijan
3 points	Denmark
2 points	United Kingdom
1 point	Malta

==== Detailed voting results ====
Detailed voting results from Latvia (Final)
R/O	Country	Results			Points
R/O	Country	Jury	Televoting	Combined	Points
01	Lithuania	6	6	12	7
02	Israel				
03	France	4	4	8	5
04	Sweden		2	2	
05	Croatia	1		1	
06	Portugal				
07	Iceland	12	5	17	8
08	Greece				
09	Armenia				
10	Russia		8	8	6
11	Azerbaijan		7	7	4
12	Bosnia and Herzegovina				
13	Moldova	2		2	
14	Malta	5		5	1
15	Estonia	8	10	18	10
16	Denmark	7		7	3
17	Germany				
18	Turkey				
19	Albania				
20	Norway	10	12	22	12
21	Ukraine		1	1	
22	Romania				
23	United Kingdom	3	3	6	2
24	Finland				
25	Spain				
