= Latvia in the Eurovision Song Contest 2017 =

- Eurovision Song Contest 2017
- Country: Latvia
- Selection process: Supernova 2017
- Selection date: 26 February 2017

Competing entry
- Song: "Line"
- Artist: Triana Park
- Songwriters: Agnese Rakovska; Kristaps Ērglis; Kristians Rakovskis

Placement
- Semi-final result: Failed to qualify (18th)

Participation chronology

Latvia was represented at the Eurovision Song Contest 2017 with the song "Line" written by Agnese Rakovska, Kristaps Ērglis and Kristians Rakovskis. The song was performed by the group Triana Park. The Latvian broadcaster Latvijas Televīzija (LTV) organized the national final Supernova 2017 in order to select the Latvian entry for the 2017 contest in Kyiv, Ukraine. 22 songs were selected to compete in the national final, which consisted of four shows: two heats, one semi-final and a final. In the heats and the semi-final, four entries were selected to advance from each show: two entries selected based on a public televote and two entries selected by a four-member jury panel. Four songs ultimately qualified to compete in the final on 26 February 2017 where a public vote exclusively selected "Line" performed by Triana Park as the winner.

Latvia was drawn to compete in the first semi-final of the Eurovision Song Contest which took place on 9 May 2017. Performing as the closing entry during the show in position 18, "Line" was not announced among the top 10 entries of the first semi-final and therefore did not qualify to compete in the final. It was later revealed that Latvia placed eighteenth (last) out of the 18 participating countries in the semi-final with 21 points.

== Background ==
Prior to the 2017 contest, Latvia had participated in the Eurovision Song Contest seventeen times since its first entry in 2000. Latvia won the contest once in 2002 with the song "I Wanna" performed by Marie N. Following the introduction of semi-finals for the 2004, Latvia was able to qualify to compete in the final between 2005 and 2008. Between 2009 and 2014, the nation had failed to qualify to the final for six consecutive years. After managing to qualify to the final in the 2015 contest where they placed 6th in the final with the song "Love Injected" performed by Aminata - giving them their best placing since 2005 and highest score ever, Latvia once again qualified to the final in 2016 with the song "Heartbeat" performed by Justs which placed 15th in the final, scoring 132 points.

The Latvian national broadcaster, Latvijas Televīzija (LTV), broadcasts the event within Latvia and organises the selection process for the nation's entry. LTV confirmed their intentions to participate at the 2017 Eurovision Song Contest on 4 August 2016. Latvia has selected their entries for the Eurovision Song Contest through a national final. Since their debut in 2000 until 2012, LTV had organised the selection show Eirodziesma. In a response to the nation's failure to qualify to the final at Eurovision since 2008, between 2013 and 2014, the competition was rebranded and retooled as Dziesma. However, after failing to produce successful entries those two years, LTV developed the Supernova national final since 2015 which produced two Latvian entries that managed to qualify the nation to the final of the Eurovision Song Contest. In late August 2016, the broadcaster announced that they would organise Supernova 2017 in order to select the Latvian entry for the 2017 contest.

== Before Eurovision ==
=== Supernova 2017 ===
Supernova 2017 was the third edition of Supernova, the music competition that selects Latvia's entries for the Eurovision Song Contest. The competition commenced on 5 February 2017 and concluded with a final on 26 February 2017. All shows in the competition took place at the LTV Studio 6 in Riga, hosted by Ketija Šēnberga and Toms Grēviņš and broadcast on LTV1 as well as online via the streaming platform Replay.lv and the official Supernova website supernova.lsm.lv. Alternative broadcasts of the final also occurred on LTV7 with Elza Volonte and Ainārs Ostvalds presenting the show in sign language as well as online at lsm.lv with commentary by Aleksis Vilciņš and Karmena Stepanova.

==== Format ====
The format of the competition consisted of four shows: two heats, one semi-final and a final. LTV broadcast two introductory shows on 22 and 29 January 2017 that covered the background preparation processes and performer auditions that occurred prior to the competition. The two heats, held on 5 and 12 February 2017, each featured eleven competing entries from which four advanced to the semi-final from each show. The semi-final, held on 19 February 2017, featured the eight qualifiers from the heats from which the top four proceeded to the final. The final, held on 26 February 2017, selected the Latvian entry for Kyiv from the remaining four entries.

Results during the heats and the semi-final shows were determined by a jury panel and votes from the public. In the heats and the semi-final, the songs first faced a public vote where the top two entries qualified. The jury then selected an additional two qualifiers from the remaining entries to proceed in the competition. In the final, a public vote exclusively determined which entry would be the winner. Viewers were able to vote via telephone up to five times or via SMS with a single SMS counting as five votes. The online vote conducted through the official Supernova website allowed users to vote once per each accepted social network account: Draugiem.lv, Facebook and Twitter. Votes conducted through Spotify were based on unique listener counts, with each stream counting as one vote for each entry.

The jury participated in each show by providing feedback to the competing artists and selecting entries to advance in the competition. The panel consisted of:

- Kaspars Roga – drummer for Brainstorm and director of music videos
- Guntars Račs – musician, songwriter, producer and music publisher
- Rūdolfs Budze–DJ Rudd – DJ and producer

==== Competing entries ====
Artists and songwriters were able to submit their applications and entries separately to the broadcaster between 17 August 2016 and 28 October 2016. 168 songs were submitted and 89 performers applied for the competition at the conclusion of the submission period. Local and international jury panels were appointed by LTV for the selection process. The international jury panel evaluated the submitted songs between 28 October and 10 November 2016 but only provided consultation for the local jury, which conducted both the song and performers selection, on which entries should be selected. The international jury panel consisted of Petri Mannonen (Commercial Director at Universal Music Group Finland and the Baltics), Matthias Mueller (CEO of Crazy Planet Records Germany), Fruzsina Szép (festival director of Lollapalooza Berlin) and Joy Deb (songwriter, co-wrote the 2015 Swedish Eurovision winning song "Heroes"). The local jury panel consisted of Daumants Kalniņš (singer and musician) and the three-member jury panel during the live shows: Kaspars Roga, Guntars Račs and Rūdolfs Budze–DJ Rudd. The performer auditions took place on 15 and 22 November 2016 at LTV Studio 6 and featured performers shortlisted from the initial 89 that had applied. The twenty-two selected performers and songs were determined on 12 December 2016 and all relevant parties were informed. The twenty-two competing artists and songs were announced during a live streamed press conference held on 13 January 2017.

Artist	Song	Songwriter(s)
Anna Zankovska	"Rage Love"	Anna Zankovska, Agnese Upleja
Crime Sea	"Escape"	Crime Sea, Marija Mickeviča
Edgars Kreilis	"We Are Angels"	Edgars Kreilis
First Question	"Naked"	Mikus Tillers
Franco Franco	"Up"	Kristīne Vaksa, Reinis Kārkliņš, Mārtiņš Spuris, Elizabete Vētra
The HiQ	"Taju ot lyubvi" (Таю от любви)	Kristaps Čimbars
Katrīna Cīrule	"Blood Runs Quicker"	Katrīna Cīrule
Katrine Lukins	"Silhouette"	Katrine Lukins, Kārlis Indrišonoks, Andris Lūkins
Laura Lo and Chris Oak	"Little Weird"	Laura Ločmele
Lauris Valters	"Magic Years"	Lauris Valters
Linda Leen	"Who Is In Charge"	Linda Leen
The Ludvig	"I'm in Love with You"	Jēkabs Ludvigs Kalmanis
Markus Riva	"Dynamite"	Miķelis Ļaksa
Miks Dukurs	"Spiritual Priest"	Gints Smukais, Edijs Dukurs
Miks Galvanovskis	"Runaway"	Miks Galvanovskis
My Radiant You	"All I Know"	Jānis Driksna
Pikaso	"U (Can Keep Your Cools)"	Jānis Lipšāns, Jānis Aišpurs, Arnis Račinskis
Rock'n'Berries	"Feel the Love"	Reinis Ašmanis, Oskars Millers, Jānis Narbuts
Santa Daņeļeviča	"Your Breath"	Santa Daņeļeviča
Toms Kalderauskis	"We Won't Back Down"	Gints Stankevičs, Kerija Kalēja
Triana Park	"Line"	Agnese Rakovska, Kristaps Ērglis, Kristians Rakovskis
UP	"One by One"	Agnese Upleja

==== Shows ====
===== Heats =====
The two heats took place on 5 and 12 February 2017. In each heat 11 acts competed and four entries qualified to the semi-final. The competing entries first faced a jury vote where the top two songs advanced; an additional two qualifiers were then selected from the remaining nine entries based on the public vote. Singer-songwriter Dons was a guest juror for the first heat, while singer, trombonist, radio host and 2009 Latvian Eurovision entrant Intars Busulis was a guest juror for the second heat.

Public vote qualifier Jury qualifier

Heat 1 – 5 February 2017
R/O	Artist	Song	Jury rank	Public Vote					Result
R/O	Artist	Song	Jury rank	Internet	Televote	Spotify streams	Total	Rank	Result
1	Katrīna Cīrule	"Blood Runs Quicker"	—	5.96%	6.07%	9.38%	7.14%	7	—N/a
2	Miks Dukurs	"Spiritual Priest"	Top 2	15.28%	13.66%	8.75%	12.56%	2	Advanced
3	Anna Zankovska	"Rage Love"	—	2.16%	2.87%	9.49%	4.84%	9	—N/a
4	Edgars Kreilis	"We Are Angels"	—	3.97%	5.83%	10.7%	6.83%	8	—N/a
5	Crime Sea	"Escape"	—	10.54%	9.62%	9.02%	9.73%	6	—N/a
6	Rock'n'Berries	"Feel the Love"	—	2.33%	5.08%	6.82%	4.74%	10	—N/a
7	Lauris Valters	"Magic Years"	—	16.15%	18.62%	9.82%	14.86%	1	Advanced
8	First Question	"Naked"	—	1.73%	4.44%	6.06%	4.08%	11	—N/a
9	Franco Franco	"Up"	Top 2	14.94%	9.02%	11.09%	11.68%	4	Advanced
10	Pikaso	"U (Can Keep Your Cools)"	—	13.9%	8.66%	10.93%	11.16%	5	—N/a
11	Linda Leen	"Who Is In Charge"	—	13.04%	16.14%	7.95%	12.38%	3	Advanced

Heat 2 – 12 February 2017
R/O	Artist	Song	Jury rank	Public Vote					Result
R/O	Artist	Song	Jury rank	Internet	Televote	Spotify streams	Total	Rank	Result
1	Katrine Lukins	"Silhouette"	—	0.73%	0.97%	5.55%	2.42%	11	—N/a
2	Markus Riva	"Dynamite"	—	5.34%	5.64%	7.33%	6.10%	6	—N/a
3	Toms Kalderauskis	"We Won't Back Down"	—	7.90%	9.20%	8.65%	8.58%	5	—N/a
4	UP	"One by One"	—	3.30%	3.39%	6.65%	4.45%	9	—N/a
5	Miks Galvanovskis	"Runaway"	—	1.27%	4.38%	7.74%	4.46%	8	—N/a
6	The HiQ	"Taju ot lyubvi"	—	3.19%	3.63%	5.07%	3.96%	10	—N/a
7	Santa Daņeļeviča	"Your Breath"	Top 2	10.28%	28.29%	7.67%	15.41%	3	Advanced
8	Laura and Chris	"Little Weird"	—	3.28%	3.01%	7.39%	4.56%	7	—N/a
9	My Radiant You	"All I Know"	—	15.01%	12.83%	10.70%	12.85%	4	Advanced
10	The Ludvig	"I'm in Love with You"	Top 2	19.09%	11.86%	17.15%	16.03%	2	Advanced
11	Triana Park	"Line"	—	30.61%	16.80%	16.10%	21.17%	1	Advanced

===== Semi-final =====
The semi-final took place on 19 February 2017. Commercial Director of Universal Music Group Finland and the Baltics Petri Mannonen was a guest juror for the semi-final. Four entries qualified to the final. The seven competing entries first faced a jury vote where the top two songs advanced. An additional two qualifiers were selected from the remaining five entries based on the public vote.

Public vote qualifier Jury qualifier

Semi-final – 19 February 2017
R/O	Artist	Song	Jury rank	Public Vote					Result
R/O	Artist	Song	Jury rank	Internet	Televote	Spotify streams	Total	Rank	Result
1	Linda Leen	"Who Is In Charge"	—	1.44%	2.69%	7.78%	3.97%	8	—N/a
2	The Ludvig	"I'm in Love with You"	Top 2	16.48%	12.57%	21.80%	16.95%	2	Advanced
3	Franco Franco	"Up"	—	2.50%	2.79%	10.68%	5.32%	7	—N/a
4	Santa Daņeļeviča	"Your Breath"	Top 2	10.76%	25.87%	9.85%	15.49%	4	Advanced
5	Lauris Valters	"Magic Years"	—	2.72%	5.08%	9.61%	5.80%	6	—N/a
6	Triana Park	"Line"	—	37.99%	24.28%	18.04%	26.77%	1	Advanced
7	Miks Dukurs	"Spiritual Priest"	—	10.50%	10.11%	8.57%	9.73%	5	—N/a
8	My Radiant You	"All I Know"	—	17.63%	16.60%	13.67%	15.97%	3	Advanced

===== Final =====
The final took place on 26 February 2017. Intars Busulis together with singer and Eurovision Song Contest 2002 winner Marija Naumova were guest jurors for the final. The four entries that qualified from the semi-final competed. The song with the highest number of votes from the public, "Line" performed by Triana Park, was declared the winner. In addition to the performances of the competing entries, guest performers included Intars Busulis and 2016 Latvian Eurovision entrant Justs.

Final – 26 February 2017
R/O	Artist	Song	Public Vote				
R/O	Artist	Song	Internet	Televote	Spotify streams	Total	Place
1	Santa Daņeļeviča	"Your Breath"	9.29%	13.71%	15.83%	12.94%	4
2	The Ludvig	"I'm in Love with You"	15.24%	12.76%	28.95%	18.98%	2
3	My Radiant You	"All I Know"	14.73%	15.66%	19.15%	16.52%	3
4	Triana Park	"Line"	60.74%	57.87%	36.07%	51.56%	1

==== Ratings ====
Viewing figures by show
Show	Date	Viewing figures		Ref.
Show	Date	Nominal	Share	Ref.
Final	26 February 2017	165,600	8.6%	

=== Promotion ===
Triana Park made several appearances across Europe to specifically promote "Line" as the Latvian Eurovision entry. on 2 April, Triana Park performed during the London Eurovision Party, which was held at the Café de Paris venue in London and hosted by Nicki French and Paddy O'Connell. Between 3 and 6 April, Triana Park took part in promotional activities in Tel Aviv, Israel where she performed during the Israel Calling event held at the Ha'teatron venue. On 8 April, Triana Park performed during the Eurovision in Concert event which was held at the Melkweg venue in Amsterdam, Netherlands and hosted by Cornald Maas and Selma Björnsdóttir. On 15 April, Triana Park performed during the Eurovision Spain Pre-Party, which was held at the Sala La Riviera venue in Madrid, Spain. In addition to their international appearances, on 25 March, Triana Park performed during the Eurovision PreParty Riga, which was organised by OGAE Latvia and held at the Crystal Club Concert Hall in Riga.

== At Eurovision ==
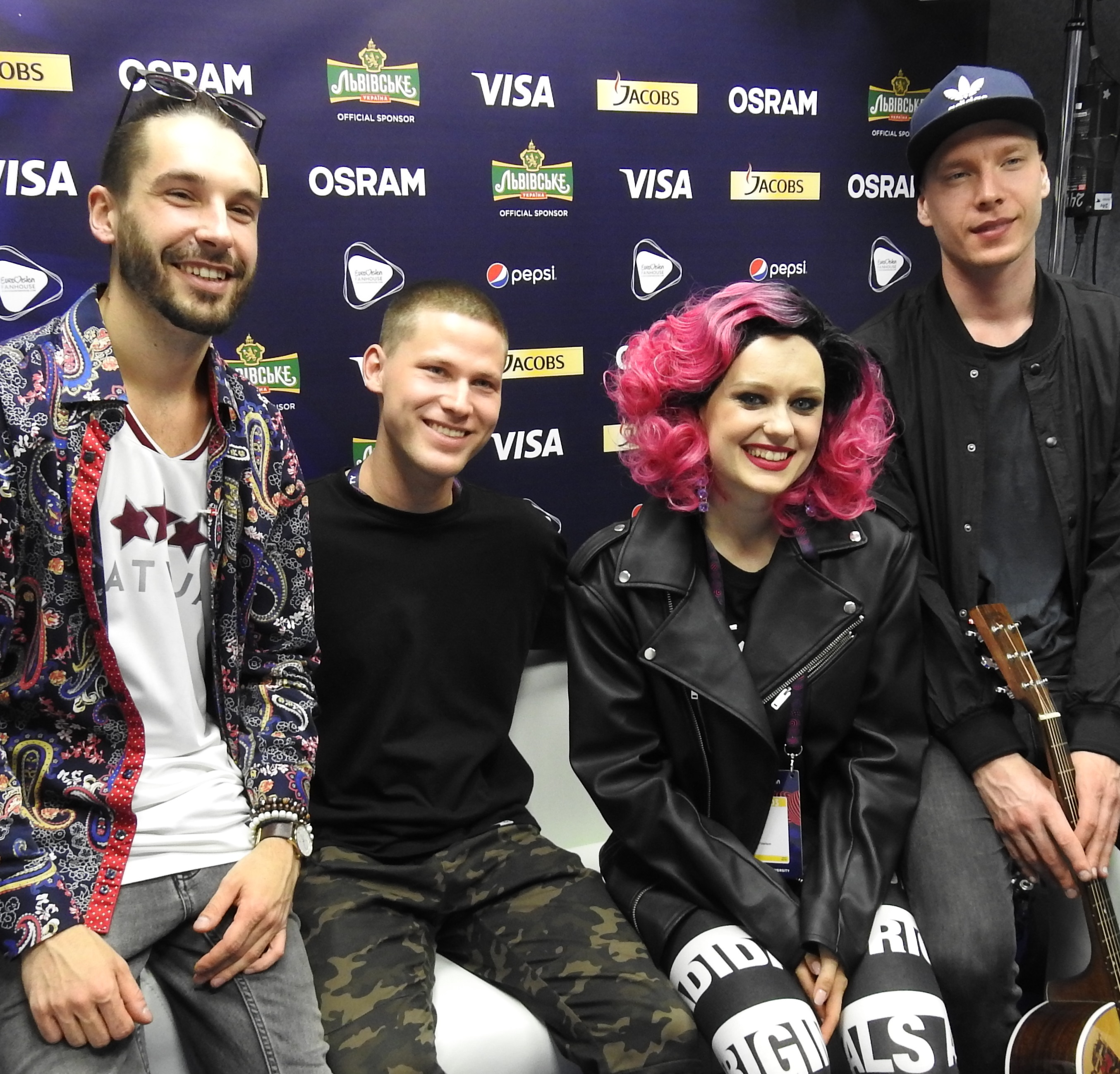
Triana Park during a press meet and greet

According to Eurovision rules, all nations with the exceptions of the host country and the "Big Five" (France, Germany, Italy, Spain and the United Kingdom) are required to qualify from one of two semi-finals in order to compete for the final; the top ten countries from each semi-final progress to the final. The European Broadcasting Union (EBU) split up the competing countries into six different pots based on voting patterns from previous contests, with countries with favourable voting histories put into the same pot. On 31 January 2017, a special allocation draw was held which placed each country into one of the two semi-finals, as well as which half of the show they would perform in. Latvia was placed into the first semi-final, to be held on 9 May 2017, and was scheduled to perform in the second half of the show.

Once all the competing songs for the 2017 contest had been released, the running order for the semi-finals was decided by the shows' producers rather than through another draw, so that similar songs were not placed next to each other. Latvia was set to perform last in position 18, following the entry from Slovenia.

The two semi-finals and the final were broadcast in Latvia on LTV1 with all shows featuring commentary by Valters Frīdenbergs who was joined by Toms Grēviņš for the final. The Latvian spokesperson, who announced the top 12-point score awarded by the Latvian jury during the final, was Aminata.

=== Semi-final ===
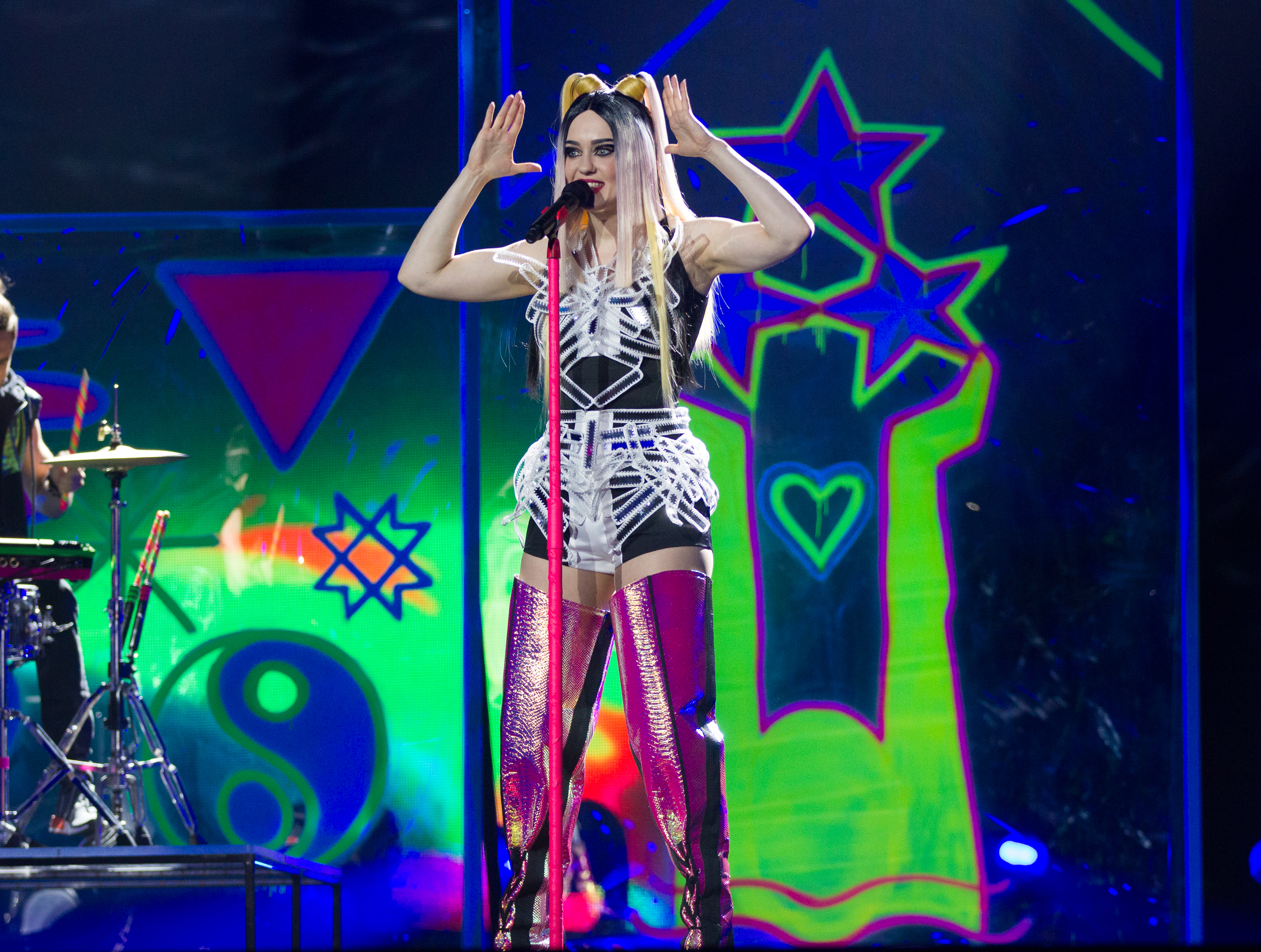
Triana Park during a rehearsal before the first semi-final

Triana Park took part in technical rehearsals on 1 May and 5 May, followed by dress rehearsals on 8 and 9 May. This included the jury show on 8 May where the professional juries of each country watched and voted on the competing entries.

The Latvian performance featured the members of Triana Park performing on stage in a band set-up surrounded by neon panels. The LED screens and floor transitioned from a black and white wave motion pattern to a neon backdrop with neon-figure people. Triana Park was joined by two backing vocalists: Antra Kūmiņa and Katrīna Anna Vīgante.

At the end of the show, Latvia was not announced among the top 10 entries in the first semi-final and therefore failed to qualify to compete in the final. It was later revealed that Latvia placed eighteenth (last) in the semi-final, receiving a total of 21 points: 20 points from the televoting and 1 point from the juries.

=== Voting ===
Voting during the three shows involved each country awarding two sets of points from 1–8, 10 and 12: one from their professional jury and the other from televoting. Each nation's jury consisted of five music industry professionals who are citizens of the country they represent, with their names published before the contest to ensure transparency. This jury judged each entry based on: vocal capacity; the stage performance; the song's composition and originality; and the overall impression by the act. In addition, no member of a national jury was permitted to be related in any way to any of the competing acts in such a way that they cannot vote impartially and independently. The individual rankings of each jury member as well as the nation's televoting results were released shortly after the grand final.

Below is a breakdown of points awarded to Latvia and awarded by Latvia in the first semi-final and grand final of the contest, and the breakdown of the jury voting and televoting conducted during the two shows:

==== Points awarded to Latvia ====
Points awarded to Latvia (Semi-final 1)
Score	Televote	Jury
12 points		
10 points		
8 points		
7 points	United Kingdom	
6 points		
5 points	Moldova	
4 points	Azerbaijan	
3 points		
2 points	Spain	
1 point	Finland; Iceland	Azerbaijan

==== Points awarded by Latvia ====
Points awarded by Latvia (Semi-final 1)
Score	Televote	Jury
12 points	Portugal	Portugal
10 points	Belgium	Australia
8 points	Moldova	Iceland
7 points	Sweden	Czech Republic
6 points	Cyprus	Moldova
5 points	Finland	Belgium
4 points	Iceland	Armenia
3 points	Poland	Poland
2 points	Azerbaijan	Sweden
1 point	Armenia	Azerbaijan

Points awarded by Latvia (Final)
Score	Televote	Jury
12 points	Belgium	Portugal
10 points	Portugal	Belgium
8 points	Moldova	Bulgaria
7 points	Bulgaria	Norway
6 points	Belarus	Austria
5 points	Romania	Australia
4 points	Sweden	United Kingdom
3 points	Italy	Romania
2 points	Hungary	Belarus
1 point	Norway	Moldova

==== Detailed voting results ====
The following members comprised the Latvian jury:

- Jānis Ozols (jury chairperson) – choral conductor, represented Latvia in the 2006 contest as a member of Cosmos
- Ieva Akuratere – singer
- Kaspars Ansons – music record producer
- Valters Pūce – cellist, composer
- Rūta Dūduma – jazz musician

Detailed voting results from Latvia (Semi-final 1)
R/O	Country	Jury							Televote	
R/O	Country	J. Ozols	I. Akuratere	K. Ansons	V. Puce	R. Duduma	Rank	Points	Rank	Points
01	Sweden	10	13	4	6	12	9	2	4	7
02	Georgia	11	10	11	12	11	12		13	
03	Australia	2	6	3	3	2	2	10	12	
04	Albania	17	16	17	17	16	17		17	
05	Belgium	13	2	5	9	5	6	5	2	10
06	Montenegro	16	17	16	16	17	16		16	
07	Finland	14	3	15	10	8	11		6	5
08	Azerbaijan	15	12	12	7	4	10	1	9	2
09	Portugal	1	1	1	1	1	1	12	1	12
10	Greece	9	9	13	13	15	13		15	
11	Poland	8	8	9	11	9	8	3	8	3
12	Moldova	4	7	6	8	3	5	6	3	8
13	Iceland	5	5	2	5	6	3	8	7	4
14	Czech Republic	3	4	8	2	10	4	7	14	
15	Cyprus	12	15	10	15	13	15		5	6
16	Armenia	7	11	7	4	7	7	4	10	1
17	Slovenia	6	14	14	14	14	14		11	
18	Latvia									

Detailed voting results from Latvia (Final)
R/O	Country	Jury							Televote	
R/O	Country	J. Ozols	I. Akuratere	K. Ansons	V. Puce	R. Duduma	Rank	Points	Rank	Points
01	Israel	23	20	25	16	25	24		23	
02	Poland	12	18	11	15	17	14		18	
03	Belarus	11	12	5	8	11	9	2	5	6
04	Austria	7	10	8	7	7	5	6	22	
05	Armenia	22	24	13	18	19	20		20	
06	Netherlands	21	7	18	14	13	15		19	
07	Moldova	3	13	7	17	9	10	1	3	8
08	Hungary	24	11	12	24	16	18		9	2
09	Italy	8	16	23	6	18	13		8	3
10	Denmark	17	6	14	11	4	11		21	
11	Portugal	1	1	3	1	1	1	12	2	10
12	Azerbaijan	18	25	15	19	15	19		12	
13	Croatia	25	17	26	20	14	22		15	
14	Australia	4	9	9	10	8	6	5	16	
15	Greece	13	23	24	22	20	21		26	
16	Spain	26	22	20	25	26	26		24	
17	Norway	14	4	1	2	2	4	7	10	1
18	United Kingdom	10	5	19	5	6	7	4	13	
19	Cyprus	20	26	21	23	23	25		14	
20	Romania	5	3	17	12	10	8	3	6	5
21	Germany	15	15	16	13	21	16		25	
22	Ukraine	19	14	10	21	22	17		17	
23	Belgium	6	2	2	3	5	2	10	1	12
24	Sweden	9	21	6	9	12	12		7	4
25	Bulgaria	2	8	4	4	3	3	8	4	7
26	France	16	19	22	26	24	23		11	
