= Opus Pro =

Latvian musical group

- Origin: Latvia
- Genres: Hard rock
- Years active: 1986–present
- Label: Microphone
- Members: Alex; Arthur Farmer; John Retenais; John Walter; Juris Veremejs
- Past members: Alexander Sircovs; Uldis Krumins; Guntis Vecgailis; Eugene Krupēņins; Oleg Upenieks; Harry Zarins

Opus Pro is a Latvian hard rock group, established in 1986. The core group consists of lead singer Oleg Andreyev (Alex), and guitarist and songwriter Harry Zarins. Opus Pro was one of the most popular Latvian groups in the 1980s and 1990s. The band released two original albums "Dzimene" and "I'm going to steal you" and a "Greatest Hits". Andreyev released an album "You and I" with daughter Aija Andrejeva, commonly known as Aisha. Aisha started performing with the group in 2004. After a 6-year break, in 2012 the group recorded the song We'll be together more after club performances in 2011.

The group's most popular and best-known songs are Freedom of the Baltics, Me and You, Pink Rain, Tonight and Sweetie.

== Discography ==
=== Studio albums ===
- "Dzimene (1996)
- "I'm going to steal you" (2000)
- "The Greatest Hits" (2002)
- "You and I" by Aisha (2006)
