= Triana Park =

Latvian musical group

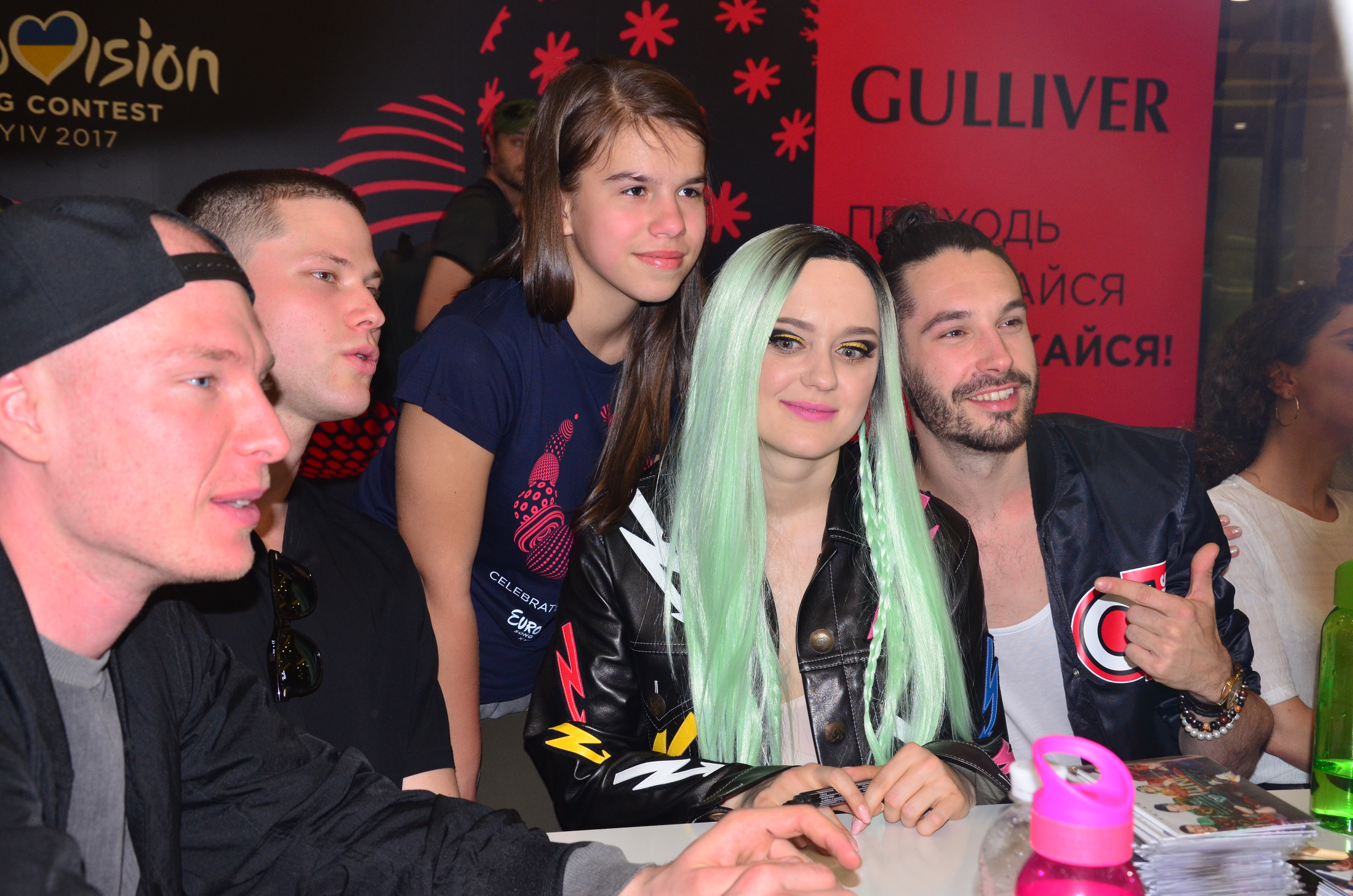
- Triana Park with a fan at a meet and greet for Eurovision 2017 in Kyiv, Ukraine.

Background information
- Origin: Riga, Latvia
- Genres: Electronic; pop rock; funk rock
- Years active: 2008–present
- Labels: Krap
- Members: Agnese Rakovska; Artūrs Strautiņš; Edgars Viļums; Kristaps Ērglis
- Past members: Aivars Rakovskis; Renārs Lazda
- Website: Official website

Triana Park (Latvian: Triānas Parks) is a Latvian group founded in 2008 consisting of lead vocalist and founder Agnese Rakovska, guitarist Artūrs Strautiņš, drummer Edgars Viļums and bassist Kristaps Ērglis. Their style combines pop and electronic with hints of hip-hop and rock.

They represented Latvia in the Eurovision Song Contest 2017 with their song "Line" They also previously attempted to represent the nation in 2008, 2009, 2010, 2011, and 2012.

== Career ==
The group was formed by Agnese Rakovska and her father Aivars Rakovski, with them being joined by Edgars Viļums and eventually also by Kristaps Ērglis. They attempted to represent Latvia in the Eurovision Song Contest in 2008, 2009, 2010, 2011 and 2012, failing to win the Eirodziesma. In 2011, their song "Upside Down" qualified for the final of the preselection, but the band pulled out as Rakovski fell ill. Triana Park's debut studio album, EnterTainment, was released in 2010. A follow-up eponymous extended play was made available for purchase in August 2014, including the lead single "Iron Blue".

The band attempted to represent Latvia for a sixth time in 2017 with "Line" and were successful, receiving 51.56% of the public vote and winning the right to perform for Latvia at the Eurovision Song Contest 2017. It was eventually announced that they would take part in the first semi final on 9 May 2017 at the International Exhibition Centre in Kyiv, Ukraine as the closing act. In Kyiv, they failed to qualify for the final, finishing last out of 18 countries in the first semi final with 21 points.

The band released their second album, Alive on 18 April 2018. It is made up of 13 songs including the Eurovision entry, Line.

== Members ==
=== Current ===
- Agnese Rakovska – lead vocals
- Artūrs Strautiņš – guitar
- Edgars Viļums – drums
- Kristaps Ērglis – bass

=== Former ===
- Aivars Rakovskis
- Renārs Lazda

== Discography ==
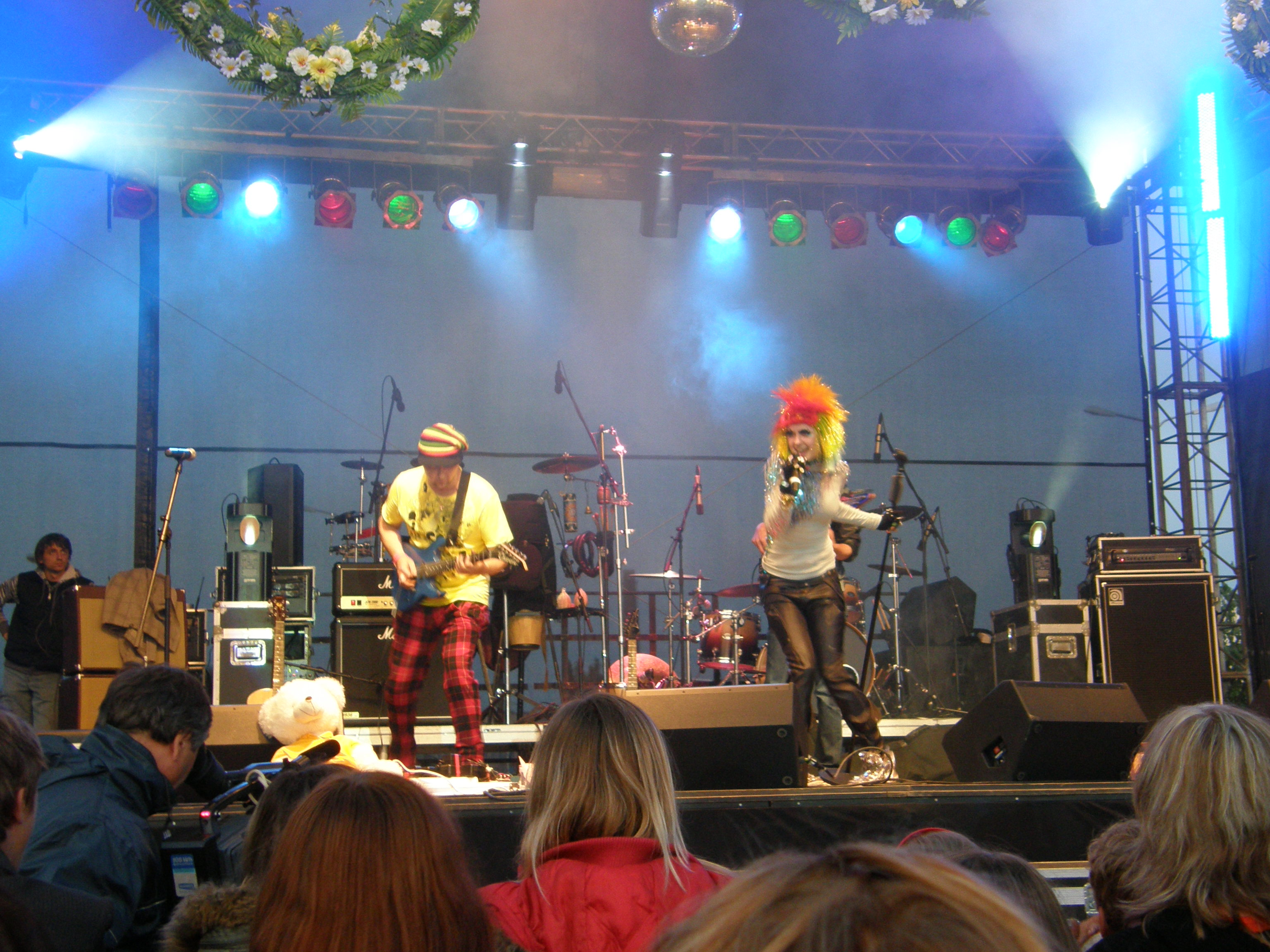
Guitarist Artūrs Strautiņš (left) and vocalist Agnese Rakovska (right) performing in 2009.

=== Albums ===
| Title | Details |
|---|---|
| EnterTainment | Released: 2010; Label: Krap; Format: Digital download, CD |
| Alive | Released: 2018; Label: Krap; Format: Digital download, CD |
| Vientuļo Dzejnieku Sala | Released: 15 November 2024; Label: Format: Digital download, |CD |

=== Extended plays ===
| Title | Details |
|---|---|
| Triana Park | Released: 29 August 2014; Label: Krap; Format: Digital download |

=== Charted singles ===
| Title | Year | Peak chart positions | | Album |
| Title | Year | LVA | RUS | Album |
|---|---|---|---|---|
| "Line" | 2017 | 6 | 283 | Non-album single |

Awards and achievements
| Preceded by Justs with "Heartbeat" | Latvia in the Eurovision Song Contest; 2017 | Succeeded by Laura Rizzotto with "Funny Girl" |
