= Kārlis Lācis =

Latvian composer and pianist

- Born: September 21, 1977 (age 48); Tukums, Latvia
- Education: Jāzeps Vītols Latvian Academy of Music
- Occupation: Composer Pianist
- Years active: 1999-
- Website: www.karlislacis.lv

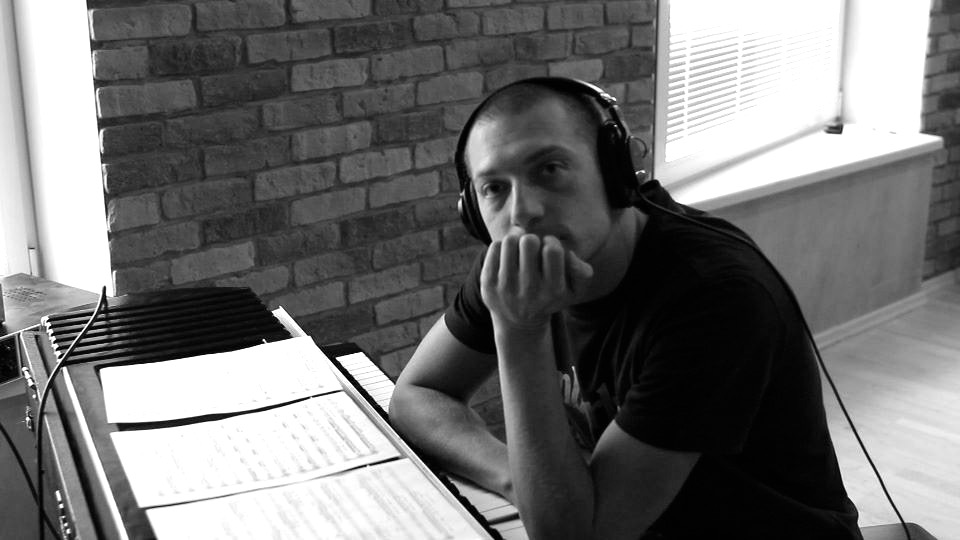
Recording of the album, Sound division studios, Riga

Kārlis Lācis (born September 21, 1977) is a Latvian contemporary composer. Along with the scores for theatre productions, movies, and musical arrangements, a large part of his work is dedicated to vocal and choral music, symphonic, and instrumental compositions, including "Te Deum" (2014) with the State Choir Latvija, and double concerto for flute, oboe and orchestra "42.195" (2014) with Liepaja symphony orchestra. "Rorate coeli" (2014) for soprano, saxophone and organ and the first symphony "Via Crucis" premiered on April 3, 2015 with Latvian National symphony orchestra. Kārlis was one of the jury members for 2014 World choir games while Latvian capital Riga was the European capital of culture. His creative contribution includes musicals staged in Liepāja theatre and Dailes theatre "Pūt vējiņi" (2011) and "Oņēgins" (2013), both rewarded with the highest annual theater award for the best music author.

Upcoming premieres will include "Waltz for double-bass and string quartet" (2017) - collaboration with famous Latvian musicians Vineta Sareika (violin), Gunārs Upatnieks (double - bass) and their colleagues from Berlin Philharmonic orchestra during the festival "Sensus " in Liepāja on July 12, 2017.

== Biography ==
Kārlis Lācis was born in Tukums. He graduated Kandava Children's School of Music (piano class), Kandava secondary school (1992), Jāzeps Mediņš College of Music in Riga (piano class, 1997) and the Latvian Academy of Music, where he studied piano with Juris Kalnciems (1997–2001, bachelor's degree, 2003–2005, master's degree), as well as composition with Juris Karlsons (2001–2002).

== Works ==
=== Theatre music ===
In 2005, Lācis composed for Deah Loher's Klāras sakari, directed by Gintaras Varnas. It premiered at Dailes Theatre on 29 February 2005. In 2006, he composed for Riga's Tango, a ballet in one act in honor of late composer Oskars Stroks. Ilya Vlasenko choreographed the show and it premiered 3 April 2006 at the Latvian National Opera. German Grekov's Hanana, directed by Dž. Dž. Džilindžers, premiered February 5, 2010 at Liepāja Theatre Later that year, on 17 September, he composed for Friedrich Schiller's Mary Stuart. This show opened at the Dailes Theatre and was also directed by Džilindžers. Pūt Vējiņi, a musical based on works by Rainis and directed by Džilindžers, opened 11 November 2011 at the Liepāja Theatre. Just over a month later, he composed for Kārlis Skalbe's children's play Pasaka par vērdiņu, directed by Pauls Timrots and open at the Dailes Theatre starting 21 December.

On 27 January 2012, he worked on Shakespeare's Romeo and Juliet, which was directed by Džilindžers and opened at the Dailes Theatre. He composed Oņegins, a musical based on Alexander Pushkin's Eugene Onegin, which was also directed by Džilindžers. It opened 22 February 2013 at Dailes Theatre. Lācis did not compose for professional theatre in 2014 and returned with Maxim Gorky's Children of the Sun, directed by Džilindžers and open at the Dailes Theatre starting 9 January 2015. He also worked on Joan of Arc, again with Džilindžers at the Dailes. This premiered 9 January 2015.

=== Discography ===
Co-producer, composer:

Year	Album title	Featured artists, singers	Label ©+℗
2000	Corners	Kārlis Lācis	Platforma Records
2002	Fresh Evergreen	Kārlis Lācis	Platforma Records
2008	Chameleon	Linda Leen	Linda Leen
2008	KИNO	Intars Busulis	Platforma Records
2010	AKTs	Intars Busulis	deBusul MUSIC
2011	Lāču tēta dziesmas	Various artists, Lyrics by Kārlis Vērdiņš	deBusul MUSIC
2012	Ziedonis. Lācis. Sievietes	Various artists, Lyrics by Imants Ziedonis	2K Publishing
2013	Mežā	Artist: Aija Andrejeva, Lyrics by Māra Zālīte	2K Publishing
2013	CITĀ©	Intars Busulis	deBusul MUSIC
2017	Nākamā pietura	Intars Busulis	deBusul MUSIC

== Additional reading ==
=== Reviews ===
- Radzobe, S. (2011, December 21). Meistardarbs Liepājas teātrī. NRA.lv. https://www.nra.lv
- Dūmiņa, L. (2012, August 23). Pūt, vējiņi! ar milža spēku. NRA.lv. https://www.nra.lv
- Kultūras diena. (2012, August 27). Latvijas teātru ābolu ķocis. Liepājas teātra mūzikls Pūt, vējiņi! Kultūras diena. https://www.diena.lv
- Znotiņš, A. (2013, January 31). Koncerta Neakadēmisks vakars ar Kārli Lāci recenzija. Kārļa Lāča mūzikas vilinājums. Kultūras diena. https://www.diena.lv
- Kultūras diena. (2013, February 27). Puškins Lāča nagos dus. Kultūras diena. https://www.diena.lv
- Čakare, V. (2013, March 8). Kur virsdrēbe, kur odere? Krosders.lv. https://www.kroders.lv
- Silabriedis, O. (2013, March 8). Neņemsim pārāk nopietni. Krosders.lv. https://www.kroders.lv
- Kultūras diena. (2013, May 15). Ābolu ķocis. Katra emocija un intonācija trāpa desmitniekā. Kultūras diena. https://www.diena.lv.

=== Interviews ===
- Rudaks, U. (2013, January 24). Kārlis Lācis: Man nevedas sarunas par lielo harmoniju. Kultūras diena. https://www.diena.lv.
- Vilkārse, I. (2013, April 8). Divu vienādu reižu nav… Kroders.lv. https://www.kroders.lv
