= Richie Roo Bear =

Latvian animation character and mascot

Ričijs Rū / Richie Roo
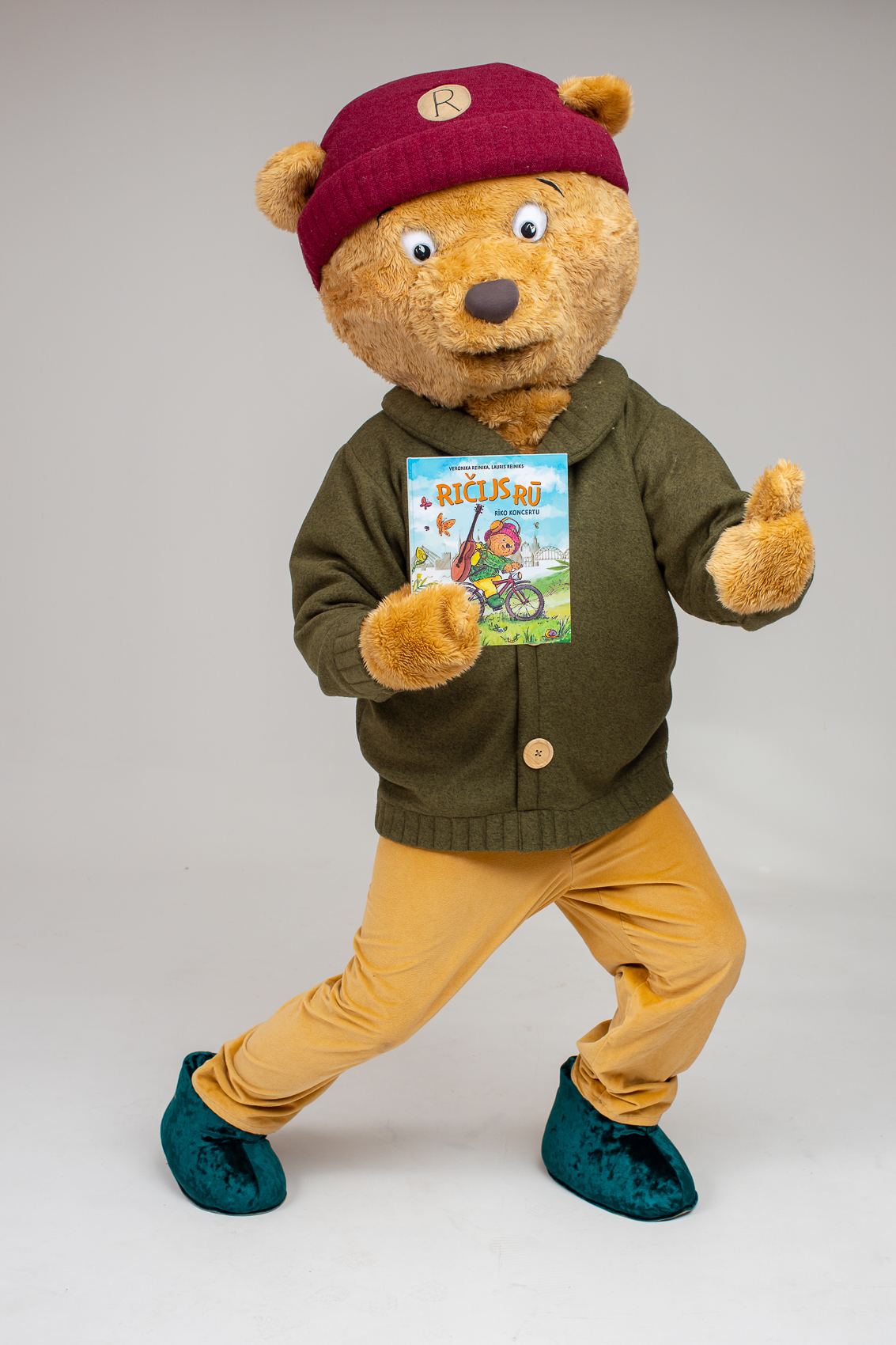

Background information
- Origin: Riga, Latvia
- Genres: Pop music; Children's music; Children's literature
- Works: "Ričijs Rū rīko koncertu" (Latvia); "Ričis Ra su gitara" (Lithuania); "Ričijs Rū rīko koncertu 2" (Latvia)
- Years active: 2021-present
- Label: MicRec
- Members: Lauris Reiniks: Rūta Reinika-Preisa; Sofija Timma; Edgars Šteins
- Website: ricijsru.lv

Richie Roo Bear (originally Ričijs Rū) is a Latvian animation character in children's literature, music and television. The fictional bear character was created in 2021 by a producer Rūta Reinika-Preisa and her brother, musician Lauris Reiniks. Richie Roo is also a touring mascot.

Based on Rūta and Lauris's grandmother Veronika Reinika's poems for children, Rūta wanted to create something special and long-lasting for her two-year-old son Richard. She approached her brother Lauris who is a composer and singer, convinced him of the idea and soon after that first songs about Richie Roo bear and his friends were created. Little Richard loved these songs right away. It was decided to continue and develop this project, bringing on board illustrator and artist Guna Mikelsone. In 2021, MicRec Publishing released a song album and interactive poetry book for children called "Ričijs Rū rīko koncertu" (Richie Roo Throws A Concert).

Adventures of Richie Roo together with songs have been released in two interactive poetry and song books - "Ričijs Rū rīko koncertu" (Richie Roo Throws a Concert) - lyrics by Veronika Reinika, music by Lauris Reiniks and a sequel "Ričijs Rū rīko koncertu 2" (Ceļojums uz Āfriku) (Richie Roo Throws a Concert 2 - A Journey to Africa) - lyrics by Rūta Reinika Preisa, music by Lauris Reiniks) Video versions of these songs have been viewed millions of times on YouTube. Separately, "Ričijs Rū un draugi" (Richie Roo and friends), the fairytale book for kids was released, These fairytales were also turned into a TV show for kids, called "Ričija Rū pasakas" (Fairytales of Richie Roo) released by the biggest Latvian video streaming service Tet TV+. The author of the book and TV show illustrations is Guna Miķelsone.

In 2022, it was translated and released in Lithuania under a title "Ričis Ra su muzika gera" (Richie Roo With a Good Music) (Veronika Reinika / Lauris Reiniks / Deivydas Zvonkus). Video clips of all Ričis Ra album songs in Lithuanian are also found on YouTube. In 2025 a streaming service Telia Play+ in Lithuania adds "Ričio Ra pasakos" TV show (Fairytales of Richie Roo) to their offered content for kids and families.

Richie Roo has had three sold-out concert show tours around Latvia: "Ričijs Rū rīko koncertu", "Ričijs Rū rīko koncertu 2 / Ceļojums uz Āfriku", and "Ričijs Rū Ziemassvētkos" (Richie Roo at Christmas).

== Awards and prizes ==
"Ričijs Rū rīko koncertu" (Richie Roo Throws a Concert) has certified Platinum disc in Latvia for selling more than 10,000 hard copies of the song album, but the book, according to votes of Riga Central Library employees, was recognized as Best Children Book of 2021. It has been a best-selling book charts leader in Latvian bookstores.

On December 5, 2023, AKKA/ LAA, The Latvian author's and copyrights society, awards Lauris Reiniks and Rūta Reinika-Preiss with the Eternity Prize for "Ričijs Rū rīko koncertu 2" album. This award is presented annually to the most broadcast, publicly performed and streamed Latvian authors.

On March 8, 2024, "Richie Roo Throws a Concert 2" album won the nomination for Best Music Album for Children at the annual Latvian Music Awards ceremony "Zelta Mikrofons 2024" (Golden Microphone)

On April 25, 2024, a song "Ričijs Rū ar gaisa balonu" (Richie Roo with a hot-air balloon) received the Gold Certificate presented by the Latvian Music Producers Association (LaIPA) as one of the most streamed songs produced in Latvia. "Ričijs Rū ar gaisa balonu" has been streamed more than 2,000,000 times since January 1, 2022.
