= Lauris Reiniks =

Latvian musician, TV host, actor

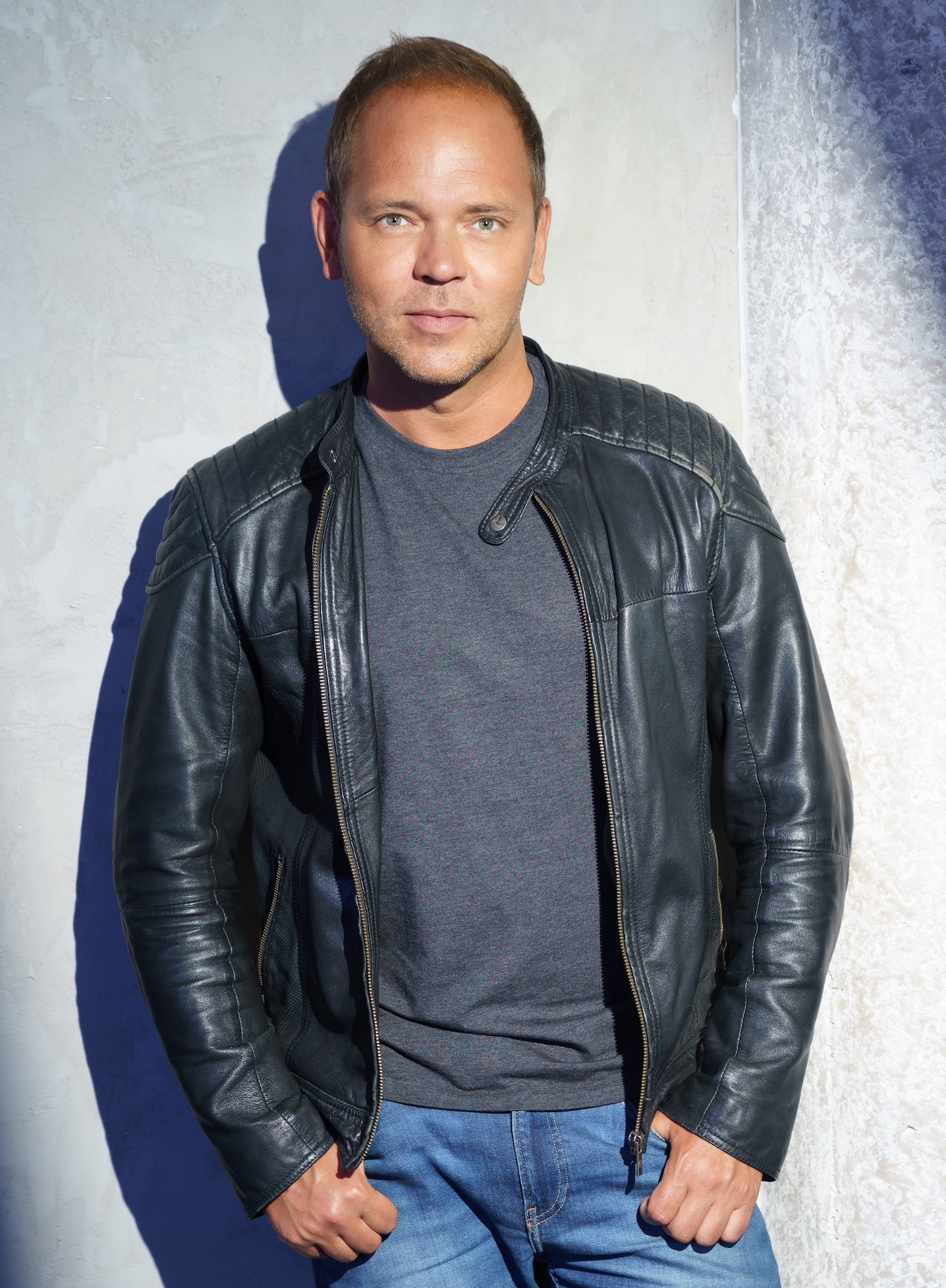
- Reiniks in 2023

Background information
- Born: July 11, 1979 (age 47); Dobele, Latvia
- Origin: Riga, Latvia
- Genres: Pop; pop-rock
- Occupations: Singer; songwriter; TV host; actor
- Years active: 1999–present
- Labels: MicRec (2008–present); MicRec PM (2005–2008); Platforma Records (2002–2005)
- Website: laurisreiniks.com

Lauris Reiniks (born July 11, 1979) is a Latvian pop music singer, songwriter, television host and actor. He has graduated from Jelgava Music college, studied communication science at the University of Latvia and trained as an actor in Los Angeles, California. Lauris Reiniks has released 9 solo albums and singles in 11 languages. He is also a composer and one of the creators of Ričijs Rū / Richie Roo Bear project for kids. As a composer and recording artist Lauris Reiniks has received more than 20 National Latvian awards and has gained international recognition in the Baltic states. Lauris Reiniks is a presenter of Supernova, Latvian National selection show for Eurovision Song Contest and also the Season 1 winner of Latvian "Dancing with the Stars" show. The millions of views of his music videos on YouTube has unofficially made him a "King of YouTube" in Latvia.

== Early years ==
Lauris was born in a small Latvian town – Dobele, grew up in a musical family in Tērvete. Lauris' first appearance on Latvian television was at the age of 5, singing in a show called "Tiekas kaimiņi"(Neighbors Meet). As a kid and teenager, Lauris was a soloist in a pop-rock group called "AURI" formed by his father. Together with this band Lauris gained his first stage experience; participating in different children music festivals, contests and other musical activities.

The Reiniks family (mother Dace, father Arturs, sister Ruta) used to be one of the most active singing families in the country. They regularly appeared on a broadcast called "Spiets" (The Swarm) and toured around Latvia with concerts.

In 1998, Latvian Television noticed Lauris and offered him to host a new musical TV show called "Nošu Spēles" (Games of Music Notes).

The show brought Lauris together with the top popular Latvian composer Raimonds Pauls who invited Lauris to participate in several his music projects and record songs. This collaboration lasted for one year when Lauris realized he could write his own music and be an independent artist.

The management company "Aktiv Music" approached Lauris Reiniks in 2000 and offered him a record deal with Platforma Records company. That was a moment when Lauris stepped into the "big" scene of Latvian pop music and started his way to fame.

== Music career highlights ==
Lauris Reiniks' most popular and renowned songs in Latvia are "Sirds Sadeg Neparasti", "Es Neesmu Neprātīgs", "Tik Balti", "Es Tev Apmulsis", "Tev Šodien Vienalga", "Es Esmu Tev Dzīslās" in a hit duet with his sister Rūta, "Pasakā" in a duet with Aisha and his 2010 Baltic smash hit "Es skrienu" (I'm running). Most of his Latvian songs are written in collaboration with Mārtiņš Freimanis who wrote lyrics to Lauris's music. Lyrics for songs in English are written by Lauris Reiniks himself, Dutch writer Edward Van De Vendel and American writer Gordon Pogoda. Most of Lauris Reiniks's hit songs in Latvian also have Estonian and Lithuanian versions performed by the artist himself. Estonian versions have been created in collaboration with Leelo Tungal, the Estonian writer and translator. Lithuanian versions have been adapted working together with Justinas Jankevičius and Deivydas Zvonkus, renowned Lithuanian writers and artists.

- Three times Lauris Reiniks has been a winner of the annual Universality Prize offered by AKKA/LAA the Latvian copyright agency for those songs that have been played most often on the radio and television in Latvia. "Tell Me" (2004) in a duet with Marija Naumova, "Sirds Sadeg Neparasti" (2007) song that had received all major music awards in Latvia already in 2003 and "Es skrienu" (2012).
- He has been a voice of a Coca-Cola commercial in Latvia.
- The 2003 album Lidot savādāk (To Fly Differently) certified Gold ( 8000 copies sold)
- In 2005 the Latvian edition of BBC pop music magazine Top of the Pops awarded Lauris with a title of "Latvian National Megastar 2004".
- In 2005 Lauris Reiniks releases a song "And You Came" in a duet with Estonian singer Maarja which becomes a hit both in Latvia and Estonia.
- In 2009 marketing and public relations specialists from 7guru.lv who presented a list of Latvia's seven most successful pop musicians ranked Lauris second, right after the band Brainstorm.
- His 2010 studio album Es skrienu was awarded the "Best Pop Album" at Annual Latvian Music Awards 2010, it also certified Gold status. The title song "Es skrienu" from the same album won in a category Radio Hit and was officially the best selling song of 2010 on doremi.lv – the biggest mp3 shop in Latvia at a time.
- In 2010 Lauris Reiniks's song, video "Es skrienu" very fast becomes a national hit. "Es skrienu" song has been recorded and released also in 8 more languages – Estonian ("Ma jooksen"), Lithuanian ("Aš bėgu"), Russian ("Я бегу"), Italian ("Correrò da te"), German ("Ich Renne"), English ("I Will Run"), Dutch (Zo'n Verhaal) and Turkish ("Koşuyorum"), hitting the radio charts and dance clubs in all three Baltic States – Latvia, Estonia and Lithuania. The German version "Ich renne" has been included in several compilations in Germany, released by EMI Germany.
- With a music video for "Es skrienu" song Lauris has set the Baltic record as the first Baltic artist who has reached over 1 million views on YouTube in less than 2 months. That happened with a Lithuanian version called "Aš bėgu".
- In 2011 Lauris Reiniks' song "Aš bėgu" wins "Song of the Year" award in Lithuania on TV3 Lithuania show "Vaikų Balsas 2011".
- On June 1, 2011, Lauris Reiniks releases his first album in Lithuania called "Aš bėgu". The album is Lithuanian adaptation of Lauris's award-winning Latvian album "Es skrienu", featuring tracks in Lithuanian from the original Latvian album as well as previously unpublished English versions of Lauris's most popular Latvian songs.
- In July 2011 Lauris Reiniks releases his first album in Estonia called "Ma jooksen" ("I'm Running"). The album is Estonian adaptation of Lauris's award-winning Latvian album "Es skrienu", featuring tracks in Estonian from the original Latvian album as well as previously unpublished English versions of Lauris's most popular Latvian songs.
- September 2011, Lauris Reiniks "Es skrienu" album certifies Gold (5000 sold CDs) in Latvia.
- February 2012, Lauris Reiniks wins "Radio Hit of the Year" award with a song "Es skrienu" at Latvian Music Awards 2011.
- August 2012, the French version of "Es skrienu" ("Je cours") is released on YouTube.
- November 2012, Lauris Reiniks releases his Christmas album "Lauris Reiniks Ziemassvētkos" followed by a concert-show in Arena Riga on December 20 (7000 people in attendance)
- 2012–2014 Lauris Reiniks in parallel to his musical and TV activities in Latvia, tours around Lithuania and Estonia with concerts and releases singles in Estonian and Lithuanian. Estonian and Lithuanian versions of Reiniks's Latvian hit songs.
- 2015. Lauris Reiniks releases a new song and video in all three Baltic languages at once. "Rīts pieneņpūkās" in Latvia, "Rytas Pienės Pūke" in Lithuania and "Hommik võilille-ehmetes" in Estonia. The song has also the English version called "Morning in Dandelion Fluff".
- 2017. Lauris Reiniks goes on a sold out National tour around 12 cities in Latvia called "Es domāšu par tevi". The tour is connected with a release of Lauris Reiniks music sheet book of 50 most popular songs, as well as the compilation album of 22 most popular Reiniks's songs of all time.
- 2018 in November 2018, Lauris Reiniks presents his new single called "Viss labi būs" which is a soundtrack and theme song for a romantic comedy "Jaungada taksometrs" (dir.by Māris Martinsons) where Lauris is playing the leading role. The song is also being released in Lithuania and Estonia under titles "Viskas bus gerai" (LT) and "Koos on hea" (EE).
- 2021. "Ričijs Rū rīko koncertu" (Richie Roo throws a concert) album and book for kids is being released in Latvia. The Reiniks family project features songs composed by Lauris Reiniks. All poems are written by Lauris and Ruta's grandmother Veronika Reinika. "Ričijs Rū rīko koncertu" songs quickly go viral and a book becomes a best seller among kids and parents.
- In 2022 National "Ričijs Rū rīko koncertu" sold-out concert tour is taking place around Latvia. The book gets recognized as a "Book of the year 2021 for children" and in June the album receives the prestigious Golden Disc award for spectacular sales.
- On January 11, 2023 "Ričijs Rū rīko koncertu" is awarded with the Platinum Disc. The album and a book has sold more than 10.000 copies.
- August 3, 2023 a sequel of "Ričijs Rū rīko koncertu" is being released. The new album and book is called "Ričijs Rū rīko koncertu 2". It is followed by a sold out tour around Latvia called "Ričijs Rū- ceļojums uz Āfriku" (Richie Roo- a trip to Africa).
- December 3, 2023 Lauris Reiniks receives his 4th "Eternity prize" (Bezgalības balva) awarded annually by Latvian copyrights agency AKKA/LAA. The prize is given for the album "Ričijs Rū rīko koncertu 2" (Richie Roo throws a concert 2) as the most published, broadcast and streamed work. Along with Lauris who is a composer of all songs, this award is given also to his sister Rūta Reinika-Preisa who wrote lyrics for the album and is a creator of the project Ričijs Rū.
- On March 8, 2024 "Richie Roo Throws a Concert 2" album wins the nomination "Best Music Album For Children" at the annual Latvian Music Awards ceremony "Zelta Mikrofons 2024" (Golden Microphone)
- In March of 2026 Lauris Reiniks goes on National concert tour around Latvia with a show called "100% Lauris Reiniks". His 9 shows were sold-out long before the tour kicked off. At the same time the vinyl record with Lauris's best songs of all time was released by MicRec.

== Television ==
Ever since 1998 Lauris Reiniks has been hosting several TV shows for Latvian Television LTV, TV3 Latvia, 360TV and LNT Television. Lauris has done several National TV commercials and print ads. In 2010 Lauris gets his first National TV award "Zelta Vilnis 2009" (Golden Wave) in a nomination "TV Personality of the Year" but in 2016 he received the TV3 Latvia people's choice award "Ekrāna mīlulis"- Ieguldījums Latvijas šovbiznesā (Screen's Favorite- contribution to Latvia's show business).

Lauris Reiniks has been a host of following TV shows and projects:

- 1998–2003: "Nošu spēles" LTV
- 1998–2001: International children music festival "Saules zaķis" LTV
- 2000: Eurovision Song Contest 2000 spokesperson from Latvia. LTV
- 2000: VIII Latvian school and youth song and dance festival LTV
- 2000: "Rīga 800"; LTV
- 2001–2005: "Kam gaišāka galva?" LTV
- 2002–2003: "Troksnis" LTV
- 2003: "SeMS" LTV 7
- 2004: "Junior Eurovision Latvia 2004" LTV; co-hosted by Rūta Reinika.
- 2005: IX Latvian school and youth song and dance festival LTV
- 2005: "SeMS " LTV 7
- 2007: "Dziedi ar zvaigzni" (Sing With a Star) TV3 Latvia, co-hosted by Iveta Feldmane.
- 2008: "Koru kari" " (Clash of the Choirs). TV3 Latvia
- 2009: "Muzikālā banka 2008" (Latvian Radio 2 Music Awards) LTV
- 2009: "Latvijas zelta talanti 2009" (Latvia's Golden Talents) LNT
- 2009–2010: "Latvijas ģimeņu dziedāšanas svētki" (Latvia's Singing Families) LNT
- 2012: "Pelnrušķīte" (Cinderella) LNT
- 2013: "Koru kari" " (Clash of the Choirs). TV3 Latvia
- 2014: "Izklausies redzēts" Season 1 (Your Face Sounds Familiar). TV3 Latvia
- 2015: "Izklausies redzēts" Season 2 (Your Face Sounds Familiar). TV3 Latvia
- 2016: "Izklausies redzēts" Season 3 (Your Face Sounds Familiar). TV3 Latvia
- 2020: "Pasaki to skaļi" (Say It Out Loud) Season 1 360TV
- 2021: "Pasaki to skaļi" (Say It Out Loud) Season 2 360TV
- 2022: "Pasaki to skaļi" (Say It Out Loud) Season 3 360TV
- 2022: "Supernova 2022" (Latvian Eurovision Song Contest selection) LTV
- 2023: "Supernova 2023" (Latvian Eurovision selection) LTV
- 2023: "Paaudžu duelis" (Duel of Generations) Season 1 360TV
- 2024: "Supernova 2024" (Latvian Eurovision selection) LTV
- 2025: "Supernova 2025" (Latvian Eurovision selection) LTV
- 2025: "Sapnis Citā Amerikā" (A Dream In A Different America) 360TV TET TV+
- 2026: "Supernova 2026" (Latvian Eurovision selection) LTV

== Dancing with the Stars ==
On April 8, 2007, live on TV3 Latvia Lauris Reiniks becomes the first season winner of Latvian "Dancing with the Stars" (Dejo ar Zvaigzni). He was partnered by a professional ballroom dancer and many time Latin dance champion – Aleksandra Kurusova. In the spring of 2008, an ABC Television affiliate in California, USA presented a story about Lauris as a successful pop musician and winner of the Latvian version of "Dancing with the Stars".

4 years later (2011) Lauris Reiniks is invited to participate in the same kind of show in Lithuania -"Šok su manimi" (Dance with me) on TV3 Lithuania. After three episodes, Lauris and his partner Aleksandra gave their place to the eliminated couple and withdrew from the show.

== Acting ==
As an actor for film and television Lauris Reiniks has trained at private acting schools in Los Angeles. In 2009 he finished a program at TVI Actors Studio but in 2014 he got certified at "The Acting Corps" and "Speiser/Sturges Acting Studio"

His acting credits include a role of Rolf in a musical The Sound Of Music in 2004/2005 Olympus role in a musical "Autoplanet" in 2005. As a guest star he has appeared also on "Prāts vai Instinkts" LTV series produced by Riga Pictures (2010). (2011) "Dancis pa trim" (Three to Dance) feature film produced by "Kaupo" film studio where he is playing Edvards, a Latvian soldier during the latter stages of World War II. In 2010–2012 Lauris Reiniks is playing one of the lead roles in the well-known play "Ladies Night" (Kailie Brieži) produced by Domino Teatras and staged at National Theater in Riga.

In 2016 Reiniks joined the cast of TV3 Latvia hit series "Viņas melo labāk" (Women lie better) playing Igors, an ex-criminal who is hired to pretend to be a maniac to intimidate Marta, the lead character of the show. In 2018 his character returns to the show's 6th season as a car thief and emotional criminal.

2018 also brings Lauris Reiniks his first lead role in a feature film "Jaungada Taksometrs" (New Year's Eve Taxi) where he is playing Andrejs, the taxi driver and main character of the movie. The romantic comedy is directed by internationally recognized director Māris Martinsons and produced by Kruk Films. "Jaungada taksometrs" is released in movie theaters across Latvia on November 30, 2018.

2019 - In November "Jaungada taksometrs 2" hits the movie theaters in Latvia. It is a sequel of "Jaungada taksometrs" first movie. A story takes place one year later. Lauris Reiniks again plays the lead- Andrejs, the taxi driver.

2019 Lauris Reiniks is cast as the speaking and singing voice of adult Simba in Latvian-Dubbed version of Disney new The Lion King.

2021 Lauris plays a priest on Tet TV+ series "Pefektās kāzas" (The perfect wedding) produced by Cinevilla Films.

2022 " Ričija Rū pasakas" (Fairytales of Ričijs Rū) series on Tet TV+ video streaming service where Lauris Reiniks is telling stories to kids from the book with the same title.

2023 Tet TV+/ STV TV series "No naida līdz mīlestībai" (From hate to love) where Reiniks is playing Andris Zviedris, a famous actor. The show was released in October 2023.

== Eurovision Song Contest / Eirodziesma ==
- 2001 – Lauris Reiniks in a duet with Linda Leen finishes 2nd at Latvian National selection with a song "I Wish I Knew".
- 2002 – Lauris Reiniks finishes 5th at Latvian National selection Eirodziesma 2002 with a song "My Memory Tape".
- 2003 – along with Mārtiņš Freimanis and Yana Kay a trio F.L.Y. has been created specially for Eurovision Song Contest Latvian selection. With a song "Hello From Mars" they won the National preliminaries and represented Latvia at Eurovision Song Contest 2003 taking place in Riga. The song finished 24th, which was until 2015 the lowest ever finish by a host country performer.
- 2009 – Lauris Reiniks's song "I wish I could pretend" performed by Kristina Zaharova finishes 2nd in Irish Eurovision Finals "Eurosong 2009".
- 2010 – Lauris Reiniks' song "Your Morning Lullaby" gets into the finals of Latvian Eurovision National preliminaries "Eirodziesma 2010" finishing 4th.
- 2011 – Lauris Reiniks finishes 2nd at Latvian Eurovision National preliminaries "Eirodziesma 2011" with his song "Banjo Laura". The Spanish version "La chica del Banjo" of the song is being released a month later.
- Since 2022, Lauris Reiniks has been a presenter of Supernova (Latvian TV series), National Eurovision selection show on LTV1 (Latvian National Television).

== Discography ==
- Planet 42 (2002)
- Lidot savādāk (2003)
- Tik balti (2003)
- Never Look Back (with F.L.Y.) (2003)
- Debesskrāpju spīts (2005)
- Nakts veikalā (2007)
- Es skrienu (2010)
- Aš bėgu (2011) Lithuania
- Ma jooksen (2011) Estonia
- Lauris Reiniks Ziemassvētkos (2012)
- Lauris Reiniks – Labāko dziesmu izlase (2017)
- Ričijs Rū rīko koncertu (2021)
- Ričis Ra su muzika gera (2022) Lithuania
- Ričijs Rū rīko koncertu 2 (2023)
- Ričijs Rū pilsētā (2025)
- 100% Lauris Reiniks (2026)
