= Microphone Records =

Latvian record label

- Type: Private
- Industry: Music
- Founded: 1993
- Headquarters: Riga, Latvia
- Area served: Baltics
- Key people: Elita Mīlgrāve, Guntars Račs, Klāss Vāvere
- Products: CD, DVD, Blu-ray, MP3
- Website: Company website

Microphone Records (Latvian: Mikrofona ieraksti or short MicRec) is a Latvian record label and distribution company founded in 1993 (although it can be traced back to 1992, when its first record was released under the '’MicRec'’ brand label) by professional radio journalist Elita Mīlgrāve and professional record producer and musician Guntars Račs. Since 1996, Microphone Records has a license agreement with the EMI Group on promoting and marketing EMI and Virgin artists in the Baltic states.

Microphone Records owns the following labels MicRec, Aktiv and Raibā Taureņa Ieraksti, and also operates as the official distributor for the Sony BMG, Universal Music, Playground, Elap and Going for a Song record labels, among others. Microphone Records has a publishing division "MicRec Publishing" the sub publisher for EMI Music Publishing and Sony/ATV.

Some of Latvia's most famous pop, rock and dance music artists are signed with Microphone Records: Raimonds Pauls, Prāta Vētra (Brainstorm), Lauris Reiniks, Līvi, Credo, Pērkons, Vaidava, Laima Vaikule, Olga Rajecka, Turaidas Roze, Zodiaks, Remix, Igo, Eolika, Menuets, Zigmars Liepiņš, Jānis Lūsēns, Ingus Baušķenieks, Valdis Atāls, Ieva Akuratere, Tumsa, DJ Ella, BTH, Opus Pro, Aisha, Andris Ērglis, bet bet, Jauns Mēness, Dzeguzīte, Knīpas un Knauķi, Normunds Rutulis, Ance Krauze, Marija Naumova, Marhils are some of the main artists distributed by the brand.

Microphone Records is one of the few record companies, in the region, with an international success. MicRec has gotten chart entries at the UK Top 40 (BTH) as well as the France Club Chart (DJ Ella). Represented band "Brainstorm" has had chart entries in Belgium, Germany, Poland, Sweden and other European countries. MicRec has had 7 of their distributed artists competing at the grand finals of the Eurovision song contest.

In 2011 Microphone Records released Lauris Reiniks album "Es skrienu", which was later re-released in Estonia ("Ma jooksen") & Lithuania ("Aš bėgu") as well as Germany ("Ich renne").

== Currently signed artists ==
- Brainstorm
- Lauris Reiniks
- Raimonds Pauls
- Ričijs Rū / Richie Roo / Ričis Ra
- Musiqq
- LieneCandy
- Aija Andrejeva
- Līvi
- Ivo Fomins
- Detlef Zoo
- Nikolajs Puzikovs
- BTH
- Normunds Rutulis
- [Ex [da] Bass]
- Evija Sloka
- Fomins & Kleins
- F.L.Y.
- bet bet
- Kazha
- Bonaparti.lv
- Credo
- Hospitāļu iela
- Labvēlīgais Tips
- Tumsa
- Boyza II
