= Radio SWH Rock =

Radio station in Riga, Latvia

Riga; Latvia
- Frequencies: FM 89.2 (MHz) Rīga, FM 95.6 (MHz) in Liepāja

Programming
- Format: Modern alternative rock

Ownership
- Owner: Communicorp

History
- First air date: 15 November 2001

Links
- Webcast: Listen Live
- Website: www.radioswh.lv

Radio SWH Rock is a Latvian rock music radio station and part of the Radio SWH network. It primarily broadcasts rock music programming to listeners across Latvia. In 2023, the station received national broadcaster status in the country.
