= Liepāja Theatre =

Theatre in Liepaja, Latvia

Coordinates: 56.5099°N 21.0149°E

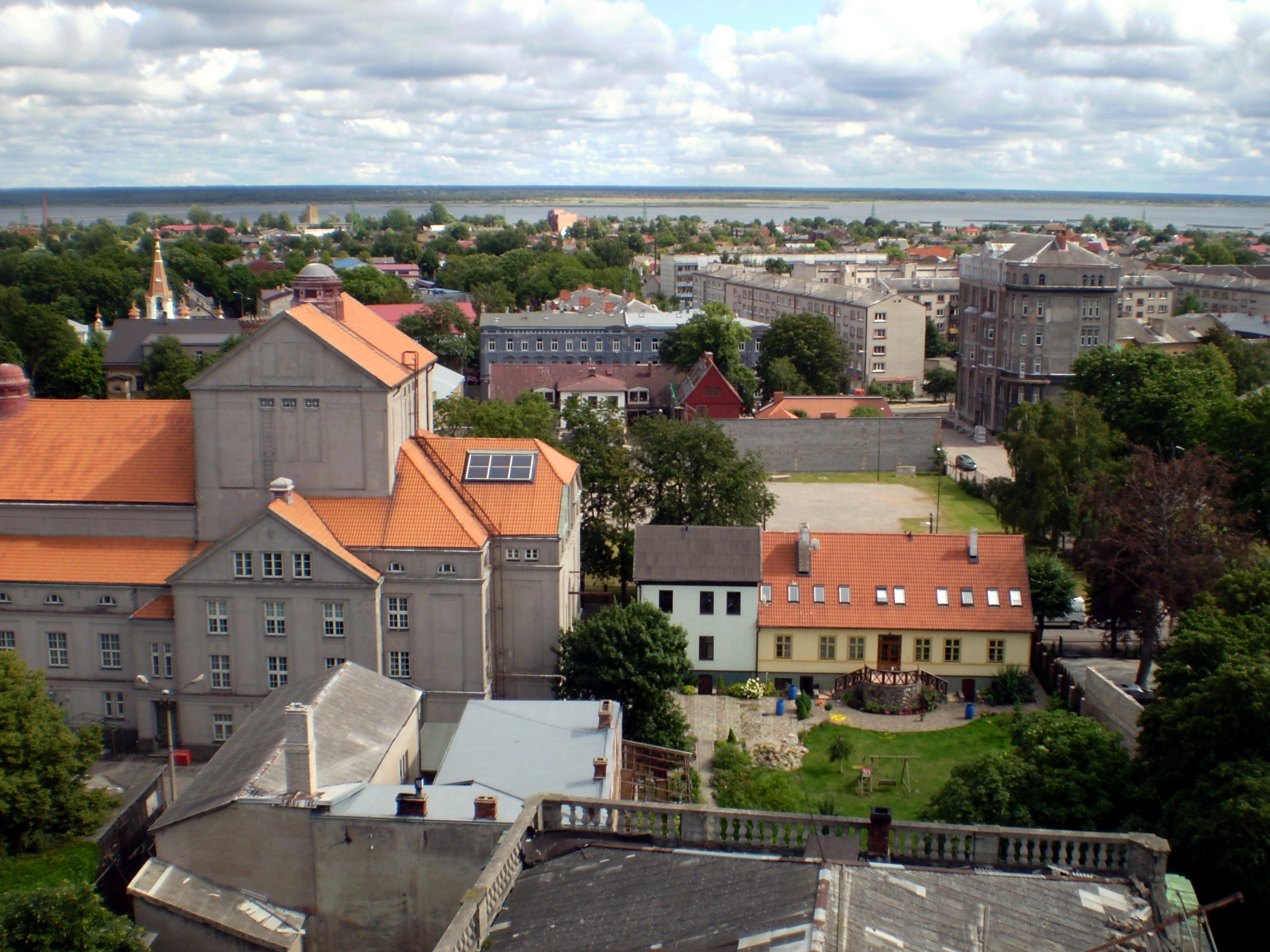
Liepāja Theatre

Liepāja Theatre (Latvian: Liepājas teātris) is a theatre in Liepāja, Latvia. It was established in 1907.
