= Latvijas Radio 5 =

Latvian national radio station

Latvijas Radio 5 - Pieci.lv
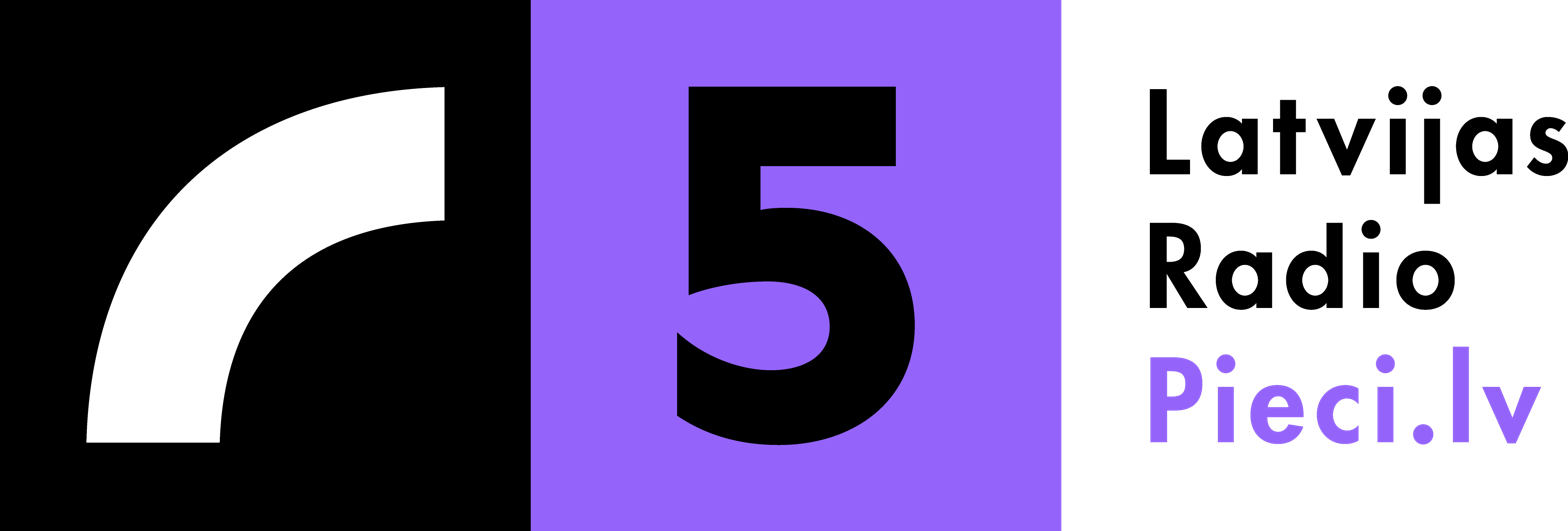
- Latvia
- RDS: pieci.lv

Programming
- Format: Top 40

Ownership
- Owner: LSM
- Sister stations: Pieci Latvieši; Pieci Hiti; Hip Hop Strāva; Pieci Latgalieši; Ukrainas Mūzika; Pieci Ziemassvētki

History
- First air date: 14 July 2013; 12 years ago

Technical information
- Transmitter coordinates: 56°56′59″N 24°06′21″E

Links
- Website: www.pieci.lv

Latvijas Radio 5 - Pieci.lv is part of Latvijas Radio public service broadcasting network based in Riga, Latvia. Pieci.lv is public service broadcasting for youth, combining subculture, different lifestyle and opinion leaders. Currently the network consists of nine internet only stations and a nationwide FM station.

On 15 March 2015, Pieci.lv competed in first European Radio Championship which was held in Milan. In the Championship the station was represented by Toms Grēviņš and Marta Līne.

== History ==
Latvijas Radio 5 - Pieci.lv was launched at 10pm on 14 July 2013. The first station to be launched was Pieci Koncerti which played exclusive live recordings from the Positivus Festival in Salacgrīva.

== Stations ==
Pieci.lv streams several stations, available both online and in mobile apps:

- Pieci Latvieši – Latvian only music
- Pieci Hiti – Pop music
- Hip Hop Strāva – Latvian Hip Hop
- Pieci Latgalieši – Music in Latgalian
- Ukrainas Mūzika – Ukraine artist support radio
- Pieci Ziemassvētki – Christmas pop-up radio (broadcasting only during the holiday season)

== Frequency ==
City	Frequency
Rīga	93,1
Liepāja	97,9
Ventspils	96,5
Valmiera	89,5
Daugavpils	104,0
Rēzekne	103,8
Limbaži	100,5
Kuldīga	91,3
Saldus	102,4

== See also ==
- Latvijas radio
