= Zodiac (Latvian band) =

Latvian musical group

- Also known as: Zodiaks
- Origin: Riga, Latvian SSR
- Genres: Electronic music; Space disco
- Years active: 1980–1992
- Label: Melodiya

Zodiac (Russian: Зодиак, Latvian: Zodiaks) was a Latvian space disco band active in the Latvian Soviet Socialist Republic between 1980 and 1992. The band was extremely popular in the Soviet Union and has been credited by critics as the Soviet answer to the French band Space, which was popular at the time.

== Biography ==
Zodiac was formed by Jānis Lūsēns, then studying composition at the Latvian State Conservatory in Riga (now Jāzeps Vītols Latvian Academy of Music). The other four members of the group were also students of various faculties of the same conservatory.

Zodiac's first vinyl record Disco Alliance (Russian: Диско альянс, Latvian: Disko alianse) was released in 1980 on the monopolist Melodiya label, during the band members' studentship, and sold in 20 million copies. The album was produced by Aleksandrs Grīva, the father of band member Zane Grīva. The music featured a lot of then-unusual synthesized sounds and effects together with more conventional euro disco elements.

The second album Music in the Universe (Russian: Музыка во Вселенной) released two years later was much inspired by a meeting with cosmonauts in the Star City, Moscowm and their tales about space flights. The music of the second album was much more rock-influenced than the first.

During that time the band also performed the music of Viktor Vlasov for the films Женские радости и печали (Woman's Joys and Sorrows, 1982) and Экипаж машины боевой (The Tank Crew, 1983). The soundtracks for both films were released on a vinyl record Music from the Films (Russian: Музыка из кинофильмов) in 1985. The music of the group was also used in the documentary film about the cosmonaut artist Alexei Leonov Звёздная палитра (Star Palette, 1982).

The album In Memoriam was composed and produced by Jānis Lūsēns alone and released in 1989. The album was dedicated to the ancient and modern cultural and natural heritage of Latvia. The sound of the album turned from disco to light techno and synth-pop, while gaining a lot of Western classical-music influences as well as the influence of Jean Michel Jarre's ambient works.

The last album Clouds was released in 1991 by RiTonis (former Melodiya). It contains a hit song of the early 1990s in Latvia "My Favourite Flowers".

Disco Alliance and Music in the Universe were released together on compact disc by Mikrofona Ieraksti (which represented EMI in the Baltic states).

In the early 2000s, the Russian electronic duo PPK recorded a remix of Zodiac's composition "Zodiac" from the Disco Alliance album. This remix, titled "Reload", entered the charts in a number of territories.

In 2016, the band appeared on New Year's Eve show on Russian Channel One, performing "Pacific".

== Discography ==
All the albums are equally known under their Russian and English titles and had both spellings on their original covers.

- Disco Alliance (1980)
1. Zodiac
2. Pacific
3. Provincial Disco
4. Polo
5. Mirage
6. Rock on the Ice
7. Alliance
- Music in the Universe (1982)
1. The Mysterious Galaxy
2. Laser Illumination
3. Silver Dream
4. Photo Finish
5. The Other Side of Heaven
6. In the Light of Saturn
7. Flight Over El Dorado
- Music from the Films (Музыка из кинофильмов, Muzyka iz kinofilmov) (1985) (Russian only)

Из к/ф "Экипаж машины боевой" (From the film "The Tank Crew")
No.	Title	Length
1.	"Пришельцы (Strangers)"	2:57
2.	"В таинственном квадратe (In a Mysterious Square)"	3:08
3.	"Зеленые Чудовища (Green Monsters)"	4:45
4.	"Поединок (Duel)"	3:35
5.	"Мирное небо (Peaceful Sky)"	3:21

Из к/ф "Женские радости и печали" (From the film "Woman's Joys and Sorrows")
No.	Title	Length
6.	"Огненные дороги (Fiery Roads)"	2:45
7.	"Девичьи грезы (Maiden's Dreams)"	4:30
8.	"Волшебная ночь (Magic Night)"	3:14
9.	"Идущие впереди (Going in Advance)"	5:18
10.	"Сердце стучит (The Heart's Beating)"	3:17

- In Memoriam (1989) (Russian only)
1. In Memoriam / V Kurzeme (In Courland)
2. Ostrov Moritsala (Moricsala Island)
3. V Muzeye Pod Otkrytym Nebom (In the Open Air Museum)
4. Rundalskiy Dvorets (Rundāle Palace)
5. Doma Staroy Rigi (Houses of Old Riga)
6. Pastorale (bergerette)
7. Na Gore Zilayskalns (On the Mount Zilaiskalns)
- Mākoņi (Clouds) (1991) (Latvian only)
1. Pakrēšļa puķes (Twilight Flowers)
2. Staburags un saules meitiņa (Staburags and the Daughter of the Sun)
3. Veltījums (Dedication)
4. Daugava (Daugava River)
5. Manas mīļākās puķes (My Favourite Flowers)
6. Mākoņi (Clouds)
7. Es tevis meklēju (Searching for You)
8. Rotaļa (A Game)
9. Bohēmieša dziesma (Bohemian's Song)

== Line-up ==
Since the group rarely performed live, every new album had a new line-up except the producer Jānis Lūsēns.

Disco Alliance:

- Jānis Lūsēns – ARP Omni, ARP Odyssey, celesta, production
- Zane Grīva – piano, ARP Omni, vocals
- Andris Sīlis – guitar
- Ainārs Ašmanis – bass guitar
- Andris Reinis – drums
- Aleksander Grīva – production

Music in the Universe:

- Jānis Lūsēns – piano, Yamaha SK-50D, production
- Aivars Gudrais – guitar on tracks 2–4, 6
- Dzintars Sāgens – guitar on tracks 1, 5, 7
- Ivars Piļka – bass guitar
- Andris Reinis – drums
- Aleksander Grīva – production

The line-up on Music from the Films is unknown. The original CD cover has only the following info:

- Viktor Vlasov – composition
- Aleksander Grīva – producing, sound engineering

In Memoriam:

- Jānis Lūsēns – synthesizers, piano, production
- Zigfrīds Muktupāvels – vocals, DDD-1, violin
- Dzintars Sāgens – computer, guitar
- Guntis Zvirgzdiņš – synthesizer
- Maija Lūsēna – vocals on track 4
- Normunds Šnē – oboe on track 3
- Aivars Gudrais – guitar on track 5
- Ivars Piļka – sound engineering

Clouds:

- Jānis Lūsēns – synthesizers, piano, production
- Maija Lūsēna – vocals
- Zigfrīds Muktupāvels – vocals, programming, violin
- Aivars Gudrais – guitar
- Gatis Gaujenieks – sound engineering
- Ivars Piļka – sound engineering
- P. Joksts – cover design
