= Intars Busulis =

Latvian singer

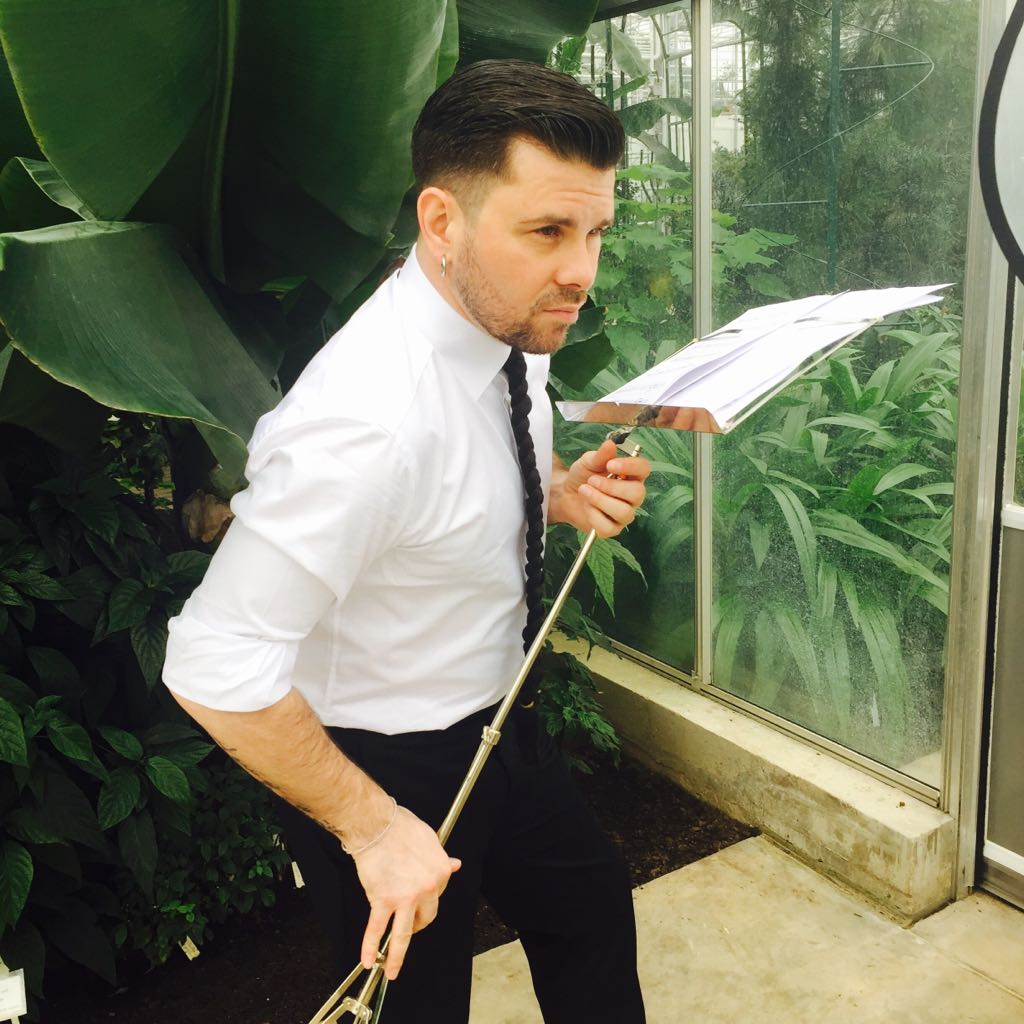
- Busulis in 2017

Background information
- Born: 2 May 1978 (age 48); Talsi, Latvia
- Genres: pop, Rock, Jazz
- Occupations: Musician singer trombone player
- Years active: 2003–present
- Label: deBusul Music
- Website: intarsbusulis.com

Intars Busulis (born 2 May 1978 in Talsi, Latvia) is a Latvian singer, trombonist and musician in a Musical Union Intars Busulis & Abonementa orķestris. Wider recognition came from participation in a band called "Caffe", in 2001. Also, he has been the winner of several music competitions (including the Grand Prix of the "New Wave" in 2005), as well as, he represented Latvia in Eurovision Song Contest 2009.

He was also a contestant in the 3rd season of Russian reality television singing competition The Voice, based on The Voice series.

== Education ==
Intars Busulis got his education in Primary School, in Pastende, but musical education received by completing Talsi Children's Music School and by finishing Ventspils Music College, where he played trombone in "Ventspils big-band" led by Ziedonis Zaikovskis.

== Musical career ==
Musical career started, together with sister performing the song "Ūsainā puķe" (Latvian for "Flower with Mustache"). Also, during his childhood, played in a children's ensemble "Talsu Sprīdīši". The singer's career began in Raimonds Tiguls' project, the musical group "Caffe". The band took part in Eurosong 2002. "Caffe" lasted for four years. In parallel, he also played in the NAF Headquarters brass orchestra and jazz group "Wet Point", along with Vilnis Kundrāts. The spring of 2005 he took part in Erik Moseholms' (Danish bass guitar player) project E.Y.J.O. (European Youth Jazz Orchestra).

Intars Busulis represented Latvia in 2005 in the international contest "New Wave" and won a Grand Prix. He performed three songs – "Kiss", "Ты Ветер", "Изчезли солнечние дни".

In collaboration with composer Kārlis Lācis recorded several solo albums in Latvian, participated in K. Lācis musical "Oņegins" in Daile theater performances and also participated in the recording of a musical album "Lāču tēta dziesmas" (Latvian for "Bear Dad's songs").

In "Musical Bank" 2008, which took place in January 2009 in Ventspils, Intars Busulis won with the song "Brīvdiena" (Latvian for "Holiday"). In 2008 LNT (Latvian Independent Television) music show "Fight Club" finals in February 2009 Intars Busulis won with the song "Davai, Davai".

In Music Record Awards concert ceremony Zelta Mikrofons ("Golden Microphone", 2017) received an award in nomination – Concert-recording, for Intars Busulis, Abonementa orchesta and Liepāja Symphony Orchestra concert (2016).

A few months after the release of album Nāmakā pietura (1 March 2017), it received Golden Disc Status. In Music Record Awards concert ceremony "Golden Microphone" (2018) album "Nākamā pietura" won in two nominations – Best Pop album and Album of the year.

== Discography ==
=== Albums ===
- Shades of Kiss (2005) – publisher "Denissjazz.com"
- Kino (2008) – publisher "Platforma Records”
- AKTs (2010) – publisher "deBusul MUSIC”
- CitāC (2013) – publisher "deBusul MUSIC”
- Гравитация (2015) – publisher "deBusul MUSIC”
- Nākamā Pietura (2017) – publisher "deBusul MUSIC”
- Spēlē savā burvju flautā (2023) – publisher "deBusul MUSIC”

Awards and achievements
Preceded by Pirates of the Sea with "Wolves of the Sea"	Latvia in the Eurovision Song Contest; 2009	Succeeded by Aisha with "What For?"
