= Aisha (Latvian singer) =

Latvian singer

Aija Andrejeva
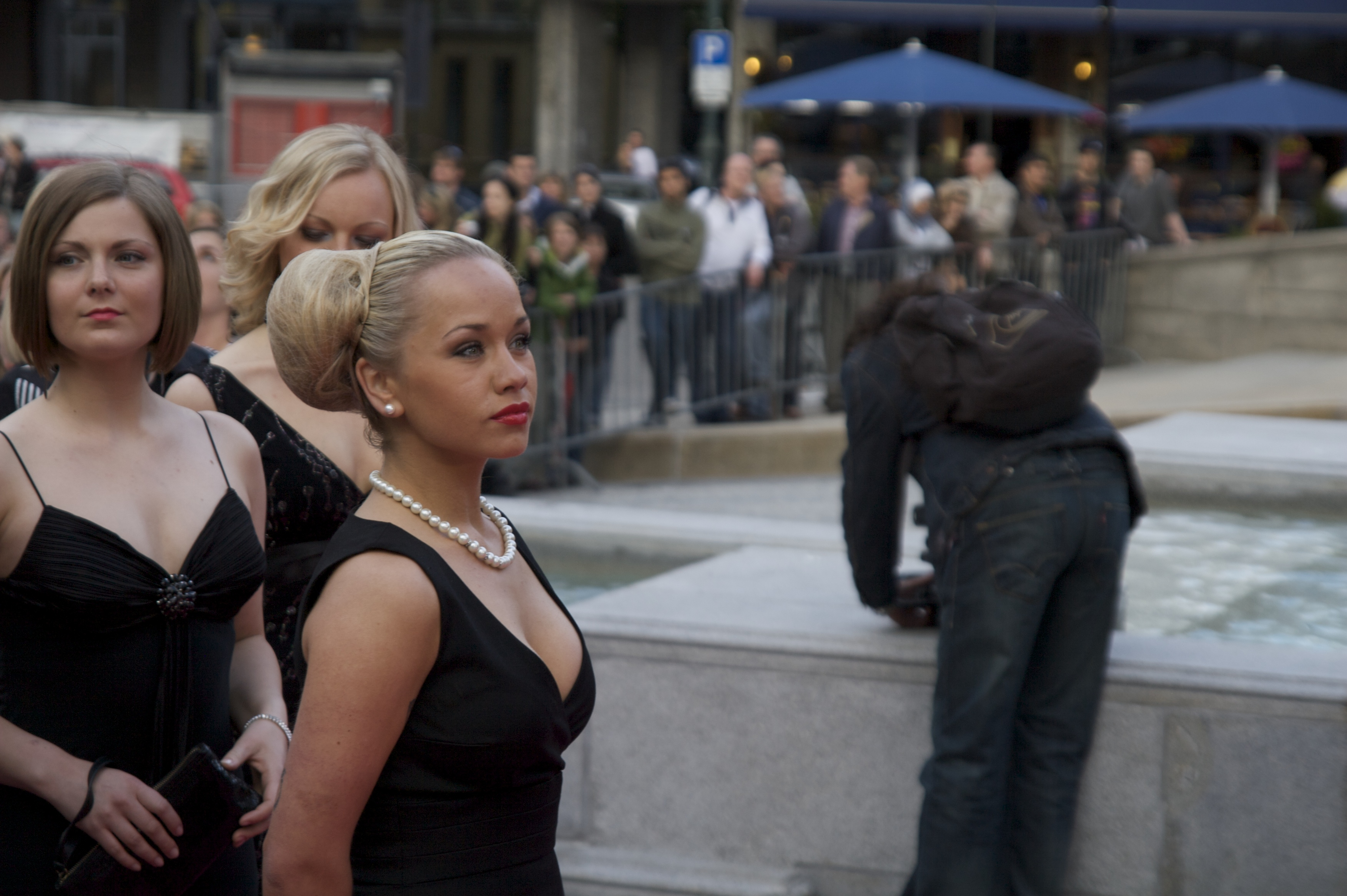

Background information
- Also known as: Aisha
- Born: 16 January 1986 (age 40); Lielvarde, Latvian SSR
- Origin: Lielvarde
- Occupation: Singer
- Years active: 1991–present

Aija Andrejeva (born 16 January 1986 in Lielvarde), also known by her former stage name Aisha ([aiʃa]), is a Latvian singer.

== Eurovision Song Contest 2010 ==
On 27 February 2010, Aija Andrejeva won the Latvian national final Eirodziesma 2010, and has represented Latvia in the Eurovision Song Contest 2010 in Oslo, Norway, with the song What For?.

Andrejeva failed to qualify to the final from the first semifinal on 25 May, coming in last place.

The following year, she presented the Latvian votes.

== Discography ==
- Tu un Es (2006)
- Viss kārtībā, Mincīt! (2008)
- Dvēselīte (2009)
- Mazais princis (2016)

Awards and achievements
Preceded by Intars Busulis with "Probka"	Latvia in the Eurovision Song Contest; 2010	Succeeded by Musiqq with "Angel in Disguise"
