= Ashot Ter-Matevosyan =

Armenian actor

Ashot Ter-Matevosyan Աշոտ Տեր-Մաթևոսյան
- Born: 23 January 1985 (age 40); Yerevan, Armenian SSR, USSR
- Occupation: Actor
- Years active: 2008–present

Ashot Lemsiki Ter-Matevosyan (Armenian: Աշոտ Լեմսիկի Տեր-Մաթևոսյան born on 23 January 1985) is an Armenian actor. He is known for his roles in many Armenian TV-series airing on Shant TV, Armenia TV and Public Television company of Armenia. He works in Goy theater as an actor.

== Filmography ==
Film
Year	Title	Role	Notes
2013	"The American Woman"		Lead role
2013	"Garegin Nzhdeh"	Matevosov	
2014	"Thank You, Dad "	Hovhannes	

Television and web
Year	Title	Role	Notes
2008–2011	Cost of Life	Aram	Main Cast
2014–2015	The Slave of Love	Rouben Santrosyan	Main Cast
2014	Ransom (Փրկագին)	Rouben Santrosyan	Main Cast
2015–2016	Stranger's Soul	Arsen Karapetyan	Main Cast
2016–2017	On the Border	Hayk	Main Cast
2016	Secret Love	David Karapetyan	Main Cast
2017	The Million in a Trap	Leo	Main Cast

As herself
Year	Title	Notes
2018	3/OFF	Guest

== See also ==
- Sofya Poghosyan
