= Matevosyan =

Matevosyan is an Armenian language surname. Notable people with the surname include:

- David Matevosyan (1960–2020), Armenian soldier, police officer, and politician
- Hrant Matevosyan (1935–2002), Armenian writer and screenwriter
- Julia Matevosyan (born 1978), electrical engineer born in Soviet Union, educated in Latvia and Sweden, and working in the US
- Karen Matevosyan, Armenian art historian
- Ashot Ter-Matevosyan (born 1985), Armenian actor
