= Sofya Poghosyan =

Armenian broadcaster, psychologist, and actress

Sofya Poghosyan Սոֆյա Պողոսյան
- Born: October 20, 1988 (age 37); Yerevan, Armenian SSR, USSR
- Occupations: Actress, psychologist, presenter, model
- Years active: 2009-present
- Spouse: Narek Gevorgyan (2010-2016)
- Relatives: Maya Poghosyan (sister)

Sofya Sergeyi Poghosyan (Armenian: Սոֆյա Սերգեյի Պողոսյան born on October 20, 1988) is an Armenian broadcaster, psychologist and actress. She is known for her roles in many Armenian TV-series airing on Shant TV.

== Filmography ==
Television and web
| Year | Title | Role | Notes |
|---|---|---|---|
| 2009-2011 | Return (Վերադարձ) | Nina | Main Cast |
| 2012–2013 | The Stranger | Mary | Main Cast |
| 2014-2015 | The Slave of Love | Anoush Babayan | Main Cast |
| 2015-2016 | Stranger's Soul | Yeva Baveyan | Main Cast |
| 2015-2016 | Secret Love | Mane Danielyan | Main Cast |
| 2017 | The Million in a Trap | Louisa | Main Cast |
| 2018 | Tandem | Mayranoush | Main Cast |

As herself
| Year | Title | Notes |
|---|---|---|
| 2018 | 3/OFF | Guest |

== See also ==
- Ashot Ter-Matevosyan
