= On the Border (Armenian TV series) =

- Genre: action, drama
- Countries of origin: Armenia, Republic of Artsakh
- Original languages: Armenian, Azerbaijani
- No. of seasons: 2
- No. of episodes: 32

Production
- Producer: Hunan Soghoyan
- Production locations: Yerevan, Armenia
- Running time: 45-50 minutes

Original release
- Network: Shant TV
- Release: December 5, 2015 – May 22, 2016

Related
- In The Army (Armenian TV series)

On the Border (Armenian: Սահմանին Sahmanin) is an Armenian action drama television series based on the complex and distorted human destinies. The series premiered on Shant TV on December 5, 2015 and comprises twelve episodes. Director was Roman Musheghyan.

The series took place in Armenia and in the Republic of Artsakh, mainly in Artsakh-Azerbaijani border.

== Cast and characters ==
=== Main cast ===
- Ashot Ter-Matevosyan
- Rozi Avetisova
- Edgar Igityan
- David Afrikian
- Arman Vardanyan

=== Recurring cast ===
- Rudolph Ghevondyan
- Artak Aivazyan
- Armen Soghoyan
- Sargis Grigoryan
- Suren Tumasyan
- Garik Chepchyan
- Khachik Ghazaryan
- Hovak Galoyan
- Gnel Ulikhanyan
- Sepuh Apiyan
- Inna Khojamiryan
- Hayk Manukyan
- Narek Aghababyan
- Karen Tjagharyan
- Armen Sargsyan
- Davit Aghajanyan
- Sofya Poghosyan
