= The Surrogate Mother (Armenian TV series) =

- Genre: Romance drama
- Developed by: Roman Musheghyan
- Country of origin: Armenia
- Original language: Armenian
- No. of seasons: 2

Production
- Production locations: Yerevan, Armenia
- Running time: 40 minutes

Original release
- Network: Shant TV
- Release: September 2, 2016

The Surrogate Mother (Armenian: Փոխնակ մայրը Pokhnak mairy) is an Armenian romantic drama television series. The series premiered on Shant TV on September 2, 2016.

The series took place in Yerevan. It was directed by Artyom Haroutyunian, and co-directed by Hayk Vardanyan.

== Series overview ==
| Season | Episodes | Originally released | |
| Season | Episodes | First released | Last released |
|---|---|---|---|
| 1 | 86 | September 2, 2016 | December 30, 2016 |
| 2 | 45 | January 9, 2017 | March 10, 2017 |

== Cast and characters ==
- Marinka Khachatryan portrays Sona (The surrogate mother)
- Anahit Kocharyan portrays Maro Sona's aunt
- Hayk Petrosyan portrays Aram Karamyan Husband of Elen
- Tigran Nersisyan portrays Arsen Rushanyan Father of Elen
- Hovak Galoyan portrays Avet Karamyan Father of Aram
- Yelena Borisenko portrays Gayane Mother of Elen
- Eva Baghdasaryan portrays Elen Rushanyan Woman of Aram, daughter of Arsen and Gayane
- Armen Dallakyan portrays Tosh Friend of Masha and Elen
- Tamara Gevorgyan portrays Kiki Friend of Elen
- Lia Zakharyan portrays Masha Friend of Elen
- Ani Bayatyan portrays Djina Women's colony prisoner
- Sevak Santrosyan portrays Amirbekyan
- Djulieta Babayan
- Source 1 =
- Source 2 =
