= List of accolades received by Anora =

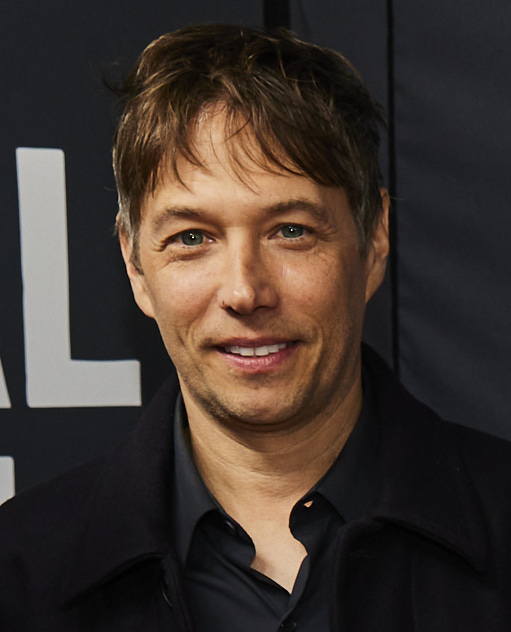
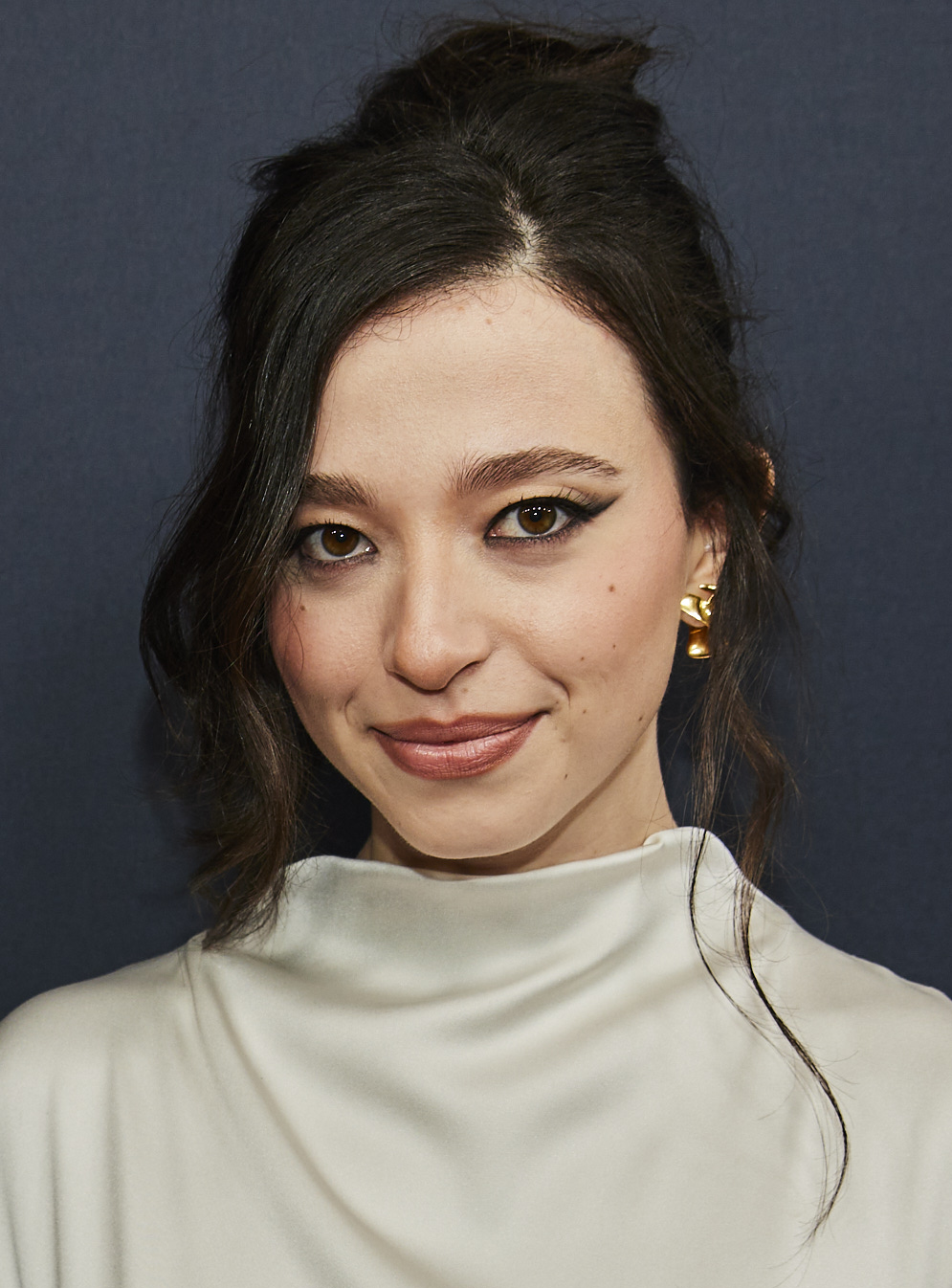
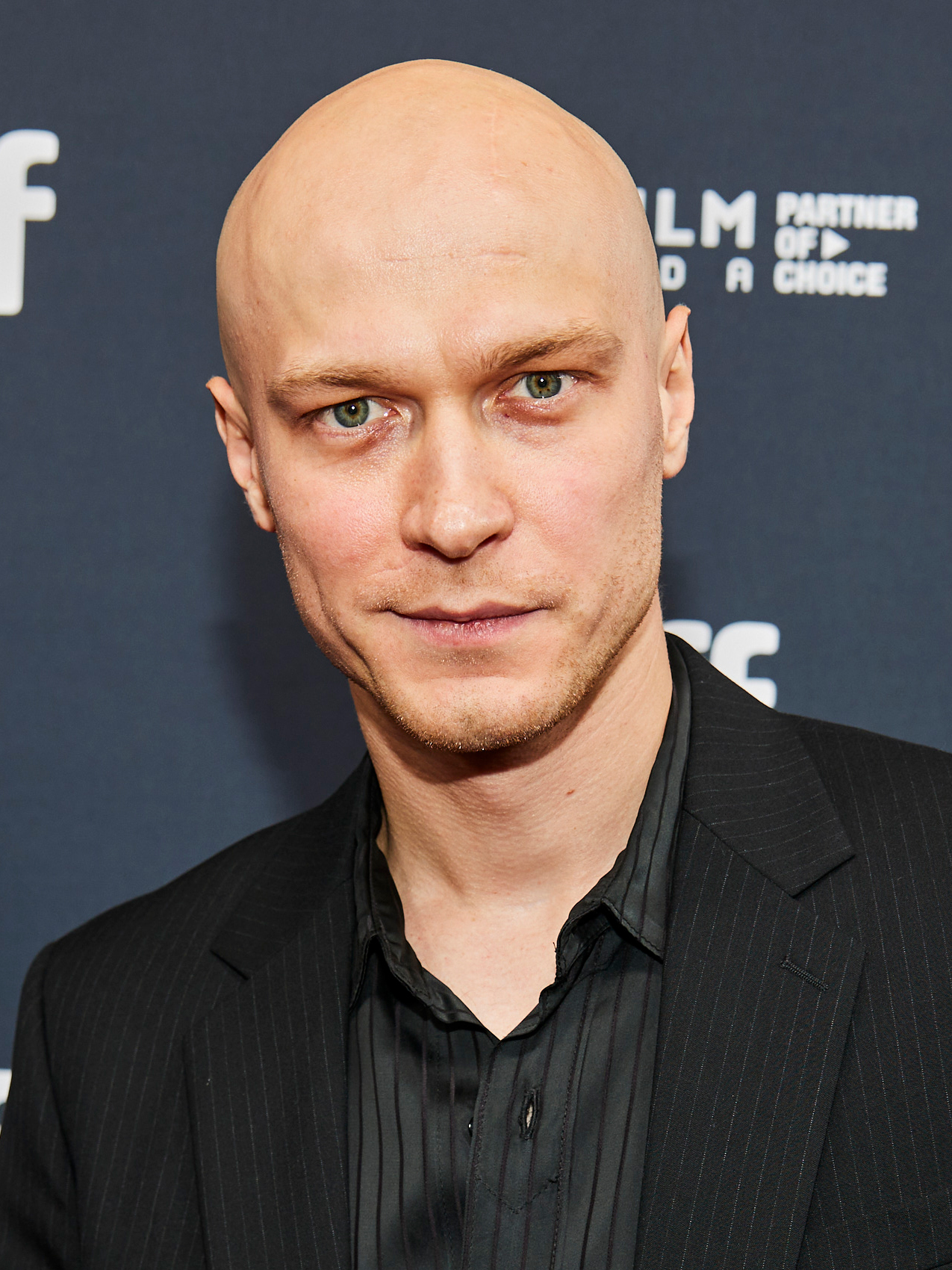
- Sean Baker (left) received critical acclaim for his direction, screenplay and film editing, and Mikey Madison (center) and Yura Borisov (right) for their performances in the film, with all three garnering nominations at the 97th Academy Awards; Baker & Madison won for their contributions.
Accolades
Award	Wins	Nominations
AACTA International Awards	0	3
American Cinema Editors Awards	0	1
Academy Awards	5	6
Alliance of Women Film Journalists	1	8
American Film Institute Awards	1	1
Astra Film and Creative Arts Awards	0	7
Austin Film Critics Association	5	7
Boston Society of Film Critics Awards	4	4
British Academy Film Awards	2	7
British Independent Film Awards	1	1
Cannes Film Festival	1	1
Capri Hollywood International Film Festival	1	1
Celebration of Cinema and Television	1	1
Chicago Film Critics Association	0	6
Critics Choice Awards	1	7
Dallas–Fort Worth Film Critics Association	4	4
David di Donatello Awards	1	1
Directors Guild of America Awards	1	1
Florida Film Critics Circle	1	7
Georgia Film Critics Association	3	5
Golden Globe Awards	0	5
Gotham Awards	0	4
Hamilton Behind the Camera Awards	1	1
Houston Film Critics Society	3	6
Imagine Film Festival	1	1
Independent Spirit Awards	3	5
Kansas City Film Critics Circle	4	4
London Film Critics' Circle	0	7
Los Angeles Film Critics Association	5	5
Mill Valley Film Festival	1	1
Miskolc International Film Festival	0	1
National Board of Review	2	2
National Society of Film Critics	4	4
New York Film Critics Circle	1	1
New York Film Critics Online	1	8
Online Film Critics Society	0	6
Palm Springs International Film Festival	1	1
Producers Guild of America Award	1	1
San Diego Film Critics Society	2	4
San Francisco Bay Area Film Critics Circle	4	6
Santa Barbara International Film Festival	1	1
Satellite Awards	1	6
Savannah Film Festival	1	1
Screen Actors Guild Awards	0	3
Seattle Film Critics Society	4	6
Set Decorators Society of America Awards	0	1
St. Louis Film Critics Association	1	3
Toronto Film Critics Association	5	6
Toronto International Film Festival	1	1
Washington D.C. Area Film Critics Association	2	7
Writers Guild of America Awards	1	1

Totals (Note: Certain award groups do not simply award one winner. They acknowledge several different recipients, have runners-up, and have third place. Since this is a specific recognition and is different from losing an award, runner-up mentions are considered wins in this award tally. For simplification and to avoid errors, each award in this list has been presumed to have had a prior nomination.)
- Wins: 91
- Nominations: 180

Anora is a 2024 American romantic comedy-drama film written, directed, and edited by Sean Baker. It follows the beleaguered marriage between Anora (Mikey Madison), a young sex worker, and Vanya Zakharov (Mark Eydelshteyn), the son of a Russian oligarch. The supporting cast includes Yura Borisov, Karren Karagulian, Vache Tovmasyan, and Aleksei Serebryakov.

Anora premiered on May 21, 2024, at the 77th Cannes Film Festival, where it won the Palme d'Or and received critical acclaim. It was released theatrically on October 18 by Neon. It was named one of the top 10 films of 2024 by the National Board of Review and the American Film Institute.

It made history at the 30th Critics' Choice Awards, becoming the first film to only win the Critics' Choice Movie Award for Best Picture and none of its other six nominations at the ceremony. It did garner the corresponding six nominations at the 97th Academy Awards: Best Picture, Best Director, Best Original Screenplay & Best Editing all for Baker, Best Actress for Madison, going on to win all 5 of these awards (atop a nomination for Best Supporting Actor for Borisov). With this, Baker became the 9th ever individual to receive 4 nominations at that ceremony in one night, and subsequently the first ever person to win 4 awards in one ceremony for a single film, tying the record for the most Oscar wins in a single year with Walt Disney. Anora is the fourth ever film to win both the Palme d'Or & the Academy Award for Best Picture.

The film also won the Producers Guild of America Award for Best Theatrical Motion Picture and, for Baker, the Directors Guild of America Award for Outstanding Directing – Feature Film. It also received five nominations at the 82nd Golden Globe Awards (including Best Motion Picture – Comedy or Musical), and seven at British Academy Film Awards (including Best Film), winning for Best Casting & Best Actress for Madison at the latter ceremony.

== Accolades ==
Award	Date of ceremony	Category	Recipient(s)	Result	Ref.
AACTA International Awards	February 7, 2025	Best International Film	Anora	Nominated	
AACTA International Awards	February 7, 2025	Best International Actress	Mikey Madison	Nominated	
AACTA International Awards	February 7, 2025	Best International Screenplay	Sean Baker	Nominated	
Academy Awards	March 2, 2025	Best Picture	Alex Coco, Samantha Quan and Sean Baker	Won	
Academy Awards	March 2, 2025	Best Director	Sean Baker	Won	
Academy Awards	March 2, 2025	Best Actress	Mikey Madison	Won	
Academy Awards	March 2, 2025	Best Supporting Actor	Yura Borisov	Nominated	
Academy Awards	March 2, 2025	Best Original Screenplay	Sean Baker	Won	
Academy Awards	March 2, 2025	Best Film Editing	Sean Baker	Won	
American Cinema Editors Awards	March 14, 2025	Best Edited Feature Film (Comedy, Theatrical)	Sean Baker	Nominated	
Alliance of Women Film Journalists	January 7, 2025	Best Film	Anora	Nominated	
Alliance of Women Film Journalists	January 7, 2025	Best Director	Sean Baker	Nominated	
Alliance of Women Film Journalists	January 7, 2025	Best Actress	Mikey Madison	Nominated	
Alliance of Women Film Journalists	January 7, 2025	Best Women's Breakthrough Performance	Mikey Madison	Won	
Alliance of Women Film Journalists	January 7, 2025	Best Actor in a Supporting Role	Yura Borisov	Nominated	
Alliance of Women Film Journalists	January 7, 2025	Best Screenplay, Original	Sean Baker	Nominated	
Alliance of Women Film Journalists	January 7, 2025	Best Editing	Sean Baker	Nominated	
Alliance of Women Film Journalists	January 7, 2025	Best Ensemble Cast and Casting Director	Anora	Nominated	
American Film Institute Awards	December 5, 2024	Top 10 Films	Anora	Honored	
Astra Film and Creative Awards	December 8, 2024	Best Picture	Anora	Nominated	
Astra Film and Creative Awards	December 8, 2024	Best Comedy or Musical	Anora	Nominated	
Astra Film and Creative Awards	December 8, 2024	Best Director	Sean Baker	Nominated	
Astra Film and Creative Awards	December 8, 2024	Best Original Screenplay	Sean Baker	Nominated	
Astra Film and Creative Awards	December 8, 2024	Best Actress	Mikey Madison	Nominated	
Astra Film and Creative Awards	December 8, 2024	Best Supporting Actor	Yura Borisov	Nominated	
Astra Film and Creative Awards	December 8, 2024	Best Editing	Sean Baker	Nominated	
Austin Film Critics Association	January 6, 2025	Best Film	Anora	Won	
Austin Film Critics Association	January 6, 2025	Best Director	Sean Baker	Won	
Austin Film Critics Association	January 6, 2025	Best Actress	Mikey Madison	Won	
Austin Film Critics Association	January 6, 2025	Best Supporting Actor	Yura Borisov	Won	
Austin Film Critics Association	January 6, 2025	Best Original Screenplay	Sean Baker	Won	
Austin Film Critics Association	January 6, 2025	Best Film Editing	Sean Baker	Nominated	
Austin Film Critics Association	January 6, 2025	Best Ensemble	Anora	Nominated	
Boston Society of Film Critics	December 8, 2024	Best Picture	Anora	Won	
Boston Society of Film Critics	December 8, 2024	Best Director	Sean Baker	Won	
Boston Society of Film Critics	December 8, 2024	Best Actress	Mikey Madison	Won	
Boston Society of Film Critics	December 8, 2024	Best Screenplay	Sean Baker	Won	
British Academy Film Awards	February 16, 2025	Best Film	Sean Baker, Alex Coco, and Samantha Quan	Nominated	
British Academy Film Awards	February 16, 2025	Best Direction	Sean Baker	Nominated	
British Academy Film Awards	February 16, 2025	Best Actress in a Leading Role	Mikey Madison	Won	
British Academy Film Awards	February 16, 2025	Best Actor in a Supporting Role	Yura Borisov	Nominated	
British Academy Film Awards	February 16, 2025	Best Original Screenplay	Sean Baker	Nominated	
British Academy Film Awards	February 16, 2025	Best Casting	Sean Baker and Samantha Quan	Won	
British Academy Film Awards	February 16, 2025	Best Editing	Sean Baker	Nominated	
British Independent Film Awards	December 8, 2024	Best International Independent Film	Sean Baker, Alex Coco, and Samantha Quan	Won	
Cannes Film Festival	May 25, 2024	Palme d'Or	Sean Baker	Won	
Capri Hollywood International Film Festival	January 2, 2025	Best Original Screenplay	Sean Baker	Won	
Celebration of Cinema and Television	November 12, 2024	Producer Award	Samantha Quan	Honored	
Chicago Film Critics Association	December 12, 2024	Best Film	Anora	Nominated	
Chicago Film Critics Association	December 12, 2024	Best Director	Sean Baker	Nominated	
Chicago Film Critics Association	December 12, 2024	Best Actress	Mikey Madison	Nominated	
Chicago Film Critics Association	December 12, 2024	Best Supporting Actor	Yura Borisov	Nominated	
Chicago Film Critics Association	December 12, 2024	Best Original Screenplay	Sean Baker	Nominated	
Chicago Film Critics Association	December 12, 2024	Best Editing	Sean Baker	Nominated	
Critics' Choice Movie Awards	February 7, 2025	Best Picture	Anora	Won	
Critics' Choice Movie Awards	February 7, 2025	Best Director	Sean Baker	Nominated	
Critics' Choice Movie Awards	February 7, 2025	Best Actress	Mikey Madison	Nominated	
Critics' Choice Movie Awards	February 7, 2025	Best Supporting Actor	Yura Borisov	Nominated	
Critics' Choice Movie Awards	February 7, 2025	Best Acting Ensemble	Anora	Nominated	
Critics' Choice Movie Awards	February 7, 2025	Best Original Screenplay	Sean Baker	Nominated	
Critics' Choice Movie Awards	February 7, 2025	Best Editing	Sean Baker	Nominated	
David di Donatello Awards	May 7, 2025	Best International Film	Sean Baker	Won	
Dallas–Fort Worth Film Critics Association	December 18, 2024	Best Picture	Anora	Won	
Dallas–Fort Worth Film Critics Association	December 18, 2024	Best Director	Sean Baker	Won	
Dallas–Fort Worth Film Critics Association	December 18, 2024	Best Actress	Mikey Madison	Won	
Dallas–Fort Worth Film Critics Association	December 18, 2024	Best Screenplay	Sean Baker	2nd Place	
Directors Guild of America Awards	February 8, 2025	Outstanding Directing – Feature Film	Sean Baker	Won	
Florida Film Critics Circle	December 20, 2024	Best Picture	Anora	Nominated	
Florida Film Critics Circle	December 20, 2024	Best Director	Sean Baker	Nominated	
Florida Film Critics Circle	December 20, 2024	Best Actress	Mikey Madison	Nominated	
Florida Film Critics Circle	December 20, 2024	Breakout Performance	Mikey Madison	Won	
Florida Film Critics Circle	December 20, 2024	Best Supporting Actor	Yura Borisov	Nominated	
Florida Film Critics Circle	December 20, 2024	Best Original Screenplay	Sean Baker	Nominated	
Florida Film Critics Circle	December 20, 2024	Best Ensemble	Anora	Nominated	
Georgia Film Critics Association	January 7, 2025	Best Picture	Anora	Won	
Georgia Film Critics Association	January 7, 2025	Best Director	Sean Baker	Nominated	
Georgia Film Critics Association	January 7, 2025	Best Actress	Mikey Madison	Won	
Georgia Film Critics Association	January 7, 2025	Best Supporting Actor	Yura Borisov	Nominated	
Georgia Film Critics Association	January 7, 2025	Best Original Screenplay	Sean Baker	Won	
Golden Globe Awards	January 5, 2025	Best Motion Picture – Musical or Comedy	Anora	Nominated	
Golden Globe Awards	January 5, 2025	Best Actress – Motion Picture Musical or Comedy	Mikey Madison	Nominated	
Golden Globe Awards	January 5, 2025	Best Supporting Actor – Motion Picture	Yura Borisov	Nominated	
Golden Globe Awards	January 5, 2025	Best Director	Sean Baker	Nominated	
Golden Globe Awards	January 5, 2025	Best Screenplay	Sean Baker	Nominated	
Golden Trailer Awards	May 29, 2025	Best Independent Trailer	Neon / GrandSon (for "Love Story")	Won	
Golden Trailer Awards	May 29, 2025	Best Independent TV Spot	Universal Pictures / Inside Job (for "Fun Review Safe")	Won	
Golden Trailer Awards	May 29, 2025	Best Romance TV Spot (for a Feature Film)	Neon / AV Squad (for "One Question")	Won	
Gotham Awards	December 2, 2024	Best Feature	Sean Baker, Alex Coco, and Samantha Quan	Nominated	
Gotham Awards	December 2, 2024	Best Director	Sean Baker	Nominated	
Gotham Awards	December 2, 2024	Outstanding Lead Performance	Mikey Madison	Nominated	
Gotham Awards	December 2, 2024	Outstanding Supporting Performance	Yura Borisov	Nominated	
Hamilton Behind the Camera Awards	November 14, 2024	Property Master Award	Kendra Eaves	Honored	
Houston Film Critics Society	January 14, 2025	Best Picture	Anora	Won	
Houston Film Critics Society	January 14, 2025	Best Director	Sean Baker	Nominated	
Houston Film Critics Society	January 14, 2025	Best Actress	Mikey Madison	Won	
Houston Film Critics Society	January 14, 2025	Best Supporting Actor	Yura Borisov	Nominated	
Houston Film Critics Society	January 14, 2025	Best Screenplay	Sean Baker	Won	
Houston Film Critics Society	January 14, 2025	Best Ensemble Cast	The cast of Anora	Nominated	
Imagine Film Festival	November 2, 2024	Silver Scream Award	Sean Baker	Won	
Independent Spirit Awards	February 22, 2025	Best Feature	Sean Baker, Alex Coco, and Samantha Quan	Won	
Independent Spirit Awards	February 22, 2025	Best Director	Sean Baker	Won	
Independent Spirit Awards	February 22, 2025	Best Lead Performance	Mikey Madison	Won	
Independent Spirit Awards	February 22, 2025	Best Supporting Performance	Yura Borisov	Nominated	
Independent Spirit Awards	February 22, 2025	Best Supporting Performance	Karren Karagulian	Nominated	
Kansas City Film Critics Circle	January 4, 2025	Best Director	Sean Baker	Runner-up	
Kansas City Film Critics Circle	January 4, 2025	Best Actress	Mikey Madison	Won (Note: Tied with Demi Moore for The Substance.)	
Kansas City Film Critics Circle	January 4, 2025	Best Supporting Actor	Yura Borisov	Runner-up	
Kansas City Film Critics Circle	January 4, 2025	Best Original Screenplay	Sean Baker	Runner-up	
London Film Critics' Circle	February 2, 2025	Film of the Year	Anora	Nominated	
London Film Critics' Circle	February 2, 2025	Director of the Year	Sean Baker	Nominated	
London Film Critics' Circle	February 2, 2025	Actress of the Year	Mikey Madison	Nominated	
London Film Critics' Circle	February 2, 2025	Supporting Actor of the Year	Yura Borisov	Nominated	
London Film Critics' Circle	February 2, 2025	Screenwriter of the Year	Sean Baker	Nominated	
London Film Critics' Circle	February 2, 2025	Breakthrough Performer	Mikey Madison	Won	
London Film Critics' Circle	February 2, 2025	Technical Achievement Award	Stunts (Manny Siverio, Christopher Colombo and Roberto Lopez)	Nominated	
Los Angeles Film Critics Association	December 8, 2024	Best Picture	Anora	Won	
Los Angeles Film Critics Association	December 8, 2024	Best Leading Performance	Mikey Madison	Won (Note: Shared with Marianne Jean-Baptiste for Hard Truths.)	
Los Angeles Film Critics Association	December 8, 2024	Best Supporting Performance	Yura Borisov	Won (Note: Shared with Kieran Culkin for A Real Pain.)	
Los Angeles Film Critics Association	December 8, 2024	Best Director	Sean Baker	Runner-up	
Los Angeles Film Critics Association	December 8, 2024	Best Screenplay	Sean Baker	Runner-up	
Mill Valley Film Festival	October 16, 2024	MVFF Breakthrough Performance Award	Mikey Madison	Honored	
Miskolc International Film Festival	September 14, 2024	Emeric Pressburger Prize	Anora	Nominated	
National Board of Review	December 4, 2024	Top Ten Films	Anora	Won (Note: This award does not have a single winner, but recognizes multiple films.)	
National Board of Review	December 4, 2024	Breakthrough Performance	Mikey Madison	Won	
National Society of Film Critics	January 4, 2025	Best Picture	Anora	2nd Place (Note: Tied with All We Imagine as Light.)	
National Society of Film Critics	January 4, 2025	Best Director	Sean Baker	3rd Place	
National Society of Film Critics	January 4, 2025	Best Actress	Mikey Madison	2nd Place	
National Society of Film Critics	January 4, 2025	Best Screenplay	Sean Baker	3rd Place	
New York Film Critics Circle	January 8, 2025	Best Screenplay	Sean Baker	Won	
New York Film Critics Online	December 16, 2024	Best Film	Anora	Nominated	
New York Film Critics Online	December 16, 2024	Best Director	Sean Baker	Nominated	
New York Film Critics Online	December 16, 2024	Best Actress	Mikey Madison	Nominated	
New York Film Critics Online	December 16, 2024	Breakthrough Performer	Mikey Madison	Won	
New York Film Critics Online	December 16, 2024	Breakthrough Performer	Mark Eidelstein	Nominated	
New York Film Critics Online	December 16, 2024	Best Supporting Actor	Yura Borisov	Nominated	
New York Film Critics Online	December 16, 2024	Best Original Screenplay	Sean Baker	Nominated	
New York Film Critics Online	December 16, 2024	Best Ensemble Cast	Anora	Nominated	
Online Film Critics Society	January 27, 2025	Best Picture	Anora	Won	
Online Film Critics Society	January 27, 2025	Best Director	Sean Baker	Nominated	
Online Film Critics Society	January 27, 2025	Best Actress	Mikey Madison	Won	
Online Film Critics Society	January 27, 2025	Best Supporting Actor	Yura Borisov	Nominated	
Online Film Critics Society	January 27, 2025	Best Original Screenplay	Sean Baker	Won	
Online Film Critics Society	January 27, 2025	Best Editing	Sean Baker	Nominated	
Palm Springs International Film Festival	January 3, 2025	Breakthrough Performance Award	Mikey Madison	Honored	
Producers Guild of America Awards	February 8, 2025	Outstanding Producer of Theatrical Motion Pictures	Alex Coco, Samantha Quan and Sean Baker	Won	
San Diego Film Critics Society	December 9, 2024	Best Film	Anora	Runner-up	
San Diego Film Critics Society	December 9, 2024	Best Actress	Mikey Madison	Nominated	
San Diego Film Critics Society	December 9, 2024	Best Original Screenplay	Sean Baker	Won	
San Diego Film Critics Society	December 9, 2024	Best Editing	Sean Baker	Nominated	
San Francisco Bay Area Film Critics Circle	December 15, 2024	Best Film	Anora	Won	
San Francisco Bay Area Film Critics Circle	December 15, 2024	Best Director	Sean Baker	Nominated	
San Francisco Bay Area Film Critics Circle	December 15, 2024	Best Actress	Mikey Madison	Nominated	
San Francisco Bay Area Film Critics Circle	December 15, 2024	Best Supporting Actor	Yura Borisov	Won	
San Francisco Bay Area Film Critics Circle	December 15, 2024	Best Original Screenplay	Sean Baker	Won	
San Francisco Bay Area Film Critics Circle	December 15, 2024	Best Film Editing	Sean Baker	Won	
Santa Barbara International Film Festival	February 9, 2025	Virtuoso Award	Mikey Madison	Honored	
Satellite Awards	January 26, 2025	Best Motion Picture – Comedy or Musical	Anora	Won	
Satellite Awards	January 26, 2025	Best Director	Sean Baker	Nominated	
Satellite Awards	January 26, 2025	Best Actress in a Motion Picture – Comedy or Musical	Mikey Madison	Nominated	
Satellite Awards	January 26, 2025	Best Actor in a Supporting Role	Yura Borisov	Nominated	
Satellite Awards	January 26, 2025	Best Original Screenplay	Sean Baker	Nominated	
Satellite Awards	January 26, 2025	Best Editing	Sean Baker	Nominated	
Savannah Film Festival	November 2, 2024	Breakthrough Award	Mikey Madison	Honored	
Screen Actors Guild Awards	February 23, 2025	Outstanding Performance by a Female Actor in a Leading Role	Mikey Madison	Nominated	
Screen Actors Guild Awards	February 23, 2025	Outstanding Performance by a Male Actor in a Supporting Role	Yura Borisov	Nominated	
Screen Actors Guild Awards	February 23, 2025	Outstanding Performance by a Cast in a Motion Picture	Yura Borisov, Mark Eydelshteyn, Karren Karagulian, Mikey Madison, Aleksei Serebryakov, and Vache Tovmasyan	Nominated	
Seattle Film Critics Society	December 16, 2024	Best Picture	Anora	Nominated	
Seattle Film Critics Society	December 16, 2024	Best Director	Sean Baker	Won	
Seattle Film Critics Society	December 16, 2024	Best Lead Actress	Mikey Madison	Won	
Seattle Film Critics Society	December 16, 2024	Best Ensemble	The cast of Anora	Won	
Seattle Film Critics Society	December 16, 2024	Best Screenplay	Sean Baker	Won	
Seattle Film Critics Society	December 16, 2024	Best Editing	Sean Baker	Nominated	
Set Decorators Society of America	February 7, 2025	Best Achievement in Décor/Design of a Contemporary Feature Film	Christopher Phelps, Stephen Phelps	Nominated	
St. Louis Film Critics Association	December 15, 2024	Best Film	Anora	Nominated	
St. Louis Film Critics Association	December 15, 2024	Best Actress	Mikey Madison	Won	
St. Louis Film Critics Association	December 15, 2024	Best Original Screenplay	Sean Baker	Nominated	
Toronto Film Critics Association	December 15, 2024	Best Film	Anora	Runner-up	
Toronto Film Critics Association	December 15, 2024	Best Director	Sean Baker	Runner-up	
Toronto Film Critics Association	December 15, 2024	Best Lead Performance	Mikey Madison	Won (Note: Shared with Marianne Jean-Baptiste for Hard Truths.)	
Toronto Film Critics Association	December 15, 2024	Best Breakthrough Performance	Mikey Madison	Nominated	
Toronto Film Critics Association	December 15, 2024	Best Supporting Performance	Yura Borisov	Won (Note: Shared with Kieran Culkin for A Real Pain.)	
Toronto Film Critics Association	December 15, 2024	Best Original Screenplay	Sean Baker	Runner-up	
Toronto International Film Festival	September 15, 2024	People's Choice Award	Anora	2nd Runner-up	
Washington D.C. Area Film Critics Association	December 8, 2024	Best Film	Anora	Nominated	
Washington D.C. Area Film Critics Association	December 8, 2024	Best Director	Sean Baker	Nominated	
Washington D.C. Area Film Critics Association	December 8, 2024	Best Actress	Mikey Madison	Won	
Washington D.C. Area Film Critics Association	December 8, 2024	Best Supporting Actor	Yura Borisov	Nominated	
Washington D.C. Area Film Critics Association	December 8, 2024	Best Original Screenplay	Sean Baker	Nominated	
Washington D.C. Area Film Critics Association	December 8, 2024	Best Editing	Sean Baker	Won (Note: Tied with Joe Walker for Dune: Part Two.)	
Washington D.C. Area Film Critics Association	December 8, 2024	Best Ensemble	Anora	Nominated	
Writers Guild of America Awards	February 15, 2025	Best Original Screenplay	Sean Baker	Won	

== See also ==
- List of people who have won multiple Academy Awards in a single year
