= Ellen's Diary =

- Էլենի Օրագիրը
- Genre: Teen drama
- Developed by: Mher Khachatryan
- Country of origin: Armenia
- Original language: Armenian
- No. of seasons: 2

Production
- Production locations: Yerevan, Armenia

Original release
- Network: Shant Premium
- Release: September 18, 2017 – June 29, 2018

Related
- Alien (Armenian TV series)

Ellen's Diary (Armenian: Էլենի Օրագիրը Eleni oragiry) is an Armenian teen drama television series. The series premiered on Shant Premium on September 18, 2017 and aired from Mondays to Fridays at 9:00 (PM).

Most of the series took place in Yerevan, Armenia.

== Cast and characters ==
- Inna Khojamiryan as Ellen
- Marinka Khachatryan as Sara
- Sisian Sephanyan as Levon
- Davit Aghajanyan as Aram
- Mariam Adamyan as Lisa
- Edgar Igityan as Max
- Mary Yeremyan as Mrs Sona
- Nelly Kheranyan as Marie Arsenovna
- Davit Hakobyan as Gurgen
- Hovak Galoyan as Arto Maximovich
