= Astrid Veillon =

French actress

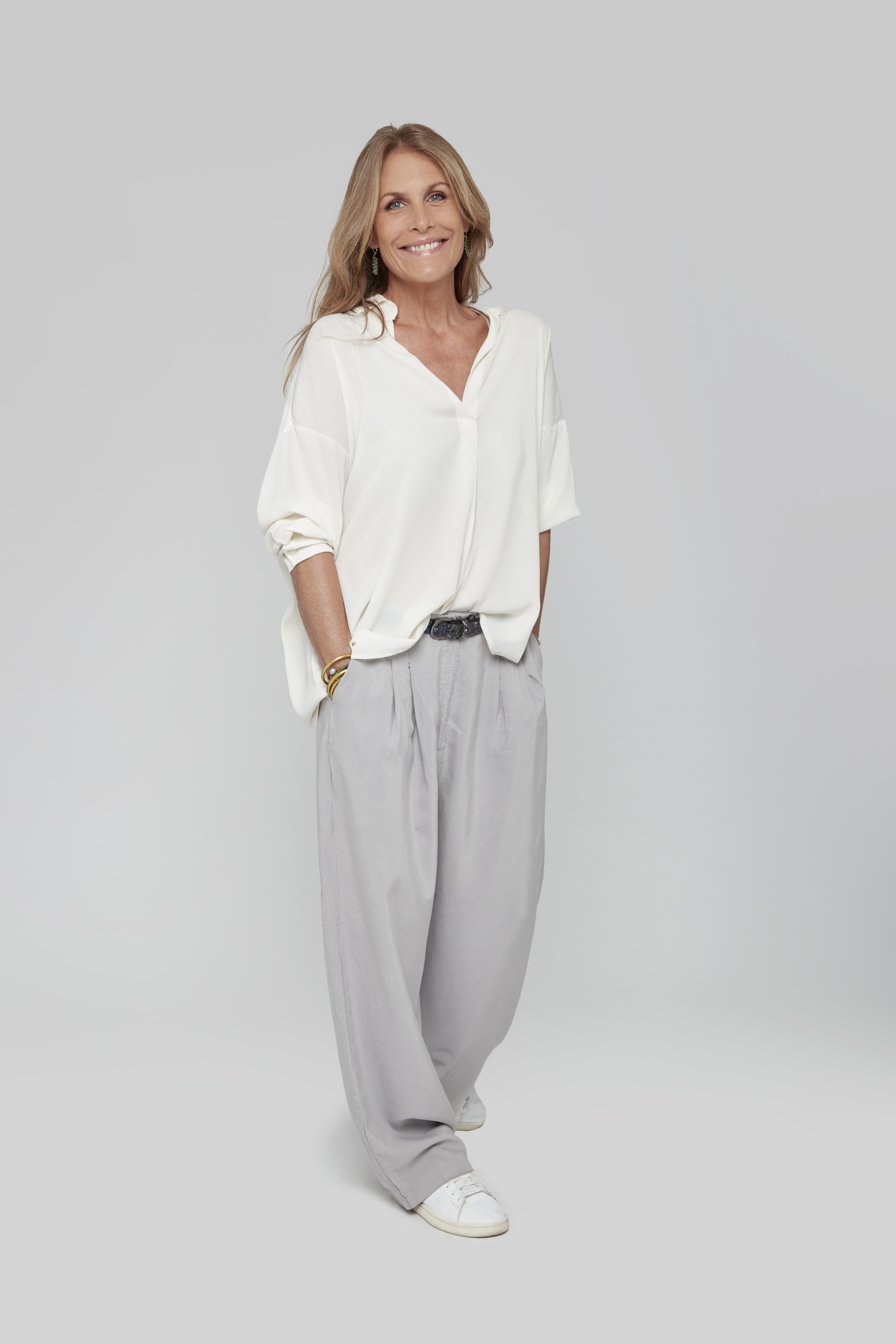
- Born: Astrid Veillon de La Garoullaye; October 30, 1971 (age 54); Sainte-Foy-lès-Lyon, Rhône, France
- Occupations: Actress, writer, director
- Notable work: Tandem, Quai n°1, La Femme du boulanger

Astrid Veillon de La Garoullaye, known professionally as Astrid Veillon (born 30 October 1971), is a French actress, author and director. She is best known for her roles in French television series such as Tandem and Quai n°1.

== Early life and career ==
Veillon was born in Sainte-Foy-lès-Lyon, in the department of Rhône, France. Her family has noble roots from Combrée, Anjou. She is the daughter of Bertrand, Viscount Veillon de La Garoullaye, and Christine Chêne. She is a niece of journalist Patrick Chêne and cousin of actress Juliette Chêne.

At the age of 9, she moved to Aix-en-Provence. She initially pursued modeling, including glamour modeling, before transitioning to acting. At 20, she relocated to Paris, joining the agency Beauties and appearing in advertisements for brands like Andros and Ibis Hotels. She has also served as an ambassador for the Foundation for Nature and Mankind.

== Career ==
=== Rise to fame (1990s) ===
Veillon began her television career with AB Productions and gained recognition through the action series Extrême Limite on TF1 (1994–1995). Her media profile rose quickly, and she appeared in French editions of magazines such as Playboy and Newlook in 1996. In 1998, she released the single "On Prend La Route", written by Félix Gray.

She starred in various prime-time television films and series including Marie Fransson, La Femme du boulanger, and Un homme en colère. In 2000, she took over a leading role in Quai n°1 on France 2, playing Commissioner Laurence Delage. She also acted alongside Alain Delon. in the miniseries Fabio Montale (2002).

=== Theatre and writing (2000s) ===
In 2003, Veillon wrote and performed in the play La Salle de bain, directed by Jean-Luc Moreau at the Comédie de Paris. She later starred opposite Alain Delon in Les Montagnes russes (2004) at the Théâtre Marigny.

After leaving Quai n°1 in 2005, she appeared in several television movies including Joséphine and La Tempête. She also performed in The Vagina Monologues and Opus Cœur at major Parisian theatres.

In 2008, she published her first novel, Pourras-tu me pardonner ?, and returned to the stage and screen with various roles. Her second book, Neuf mois dans la vie d'une femme, was released in 2010.

=== Return to TV and recent work (2010s–present) ===
In 2011, she returned to theatre in Une traversée sans histoire. She continued to act in television dramas, including Alice Nevers: Le juge est une femme, Changement de cap, and Meurtres à Aix-en-Provence.

In 2016, she began starring as Commander Léa Soler in the France 3 police procedural Tandem, a role she has continued through multiple seasons.

== Filmography ==
=== Film ===
- 1993: Tattoo (short film) – dir. Grégori Baquet
- 1994: L'Affaire – Call girl
- 1998: Sans mobile apparent (short)
- 2000: Old School – Jeanine Dupont
- 2001: Swordfish – Bank employee
- 2006: Terminus (short)
- 2013: Un prince (presque) charmant – Liliane

=== Television ===
- Premiers Baisers (1991–1992) – Adeline
- Le miel et les abeilles (1993) – Véronique
- Extrême Limite (1994–1995) – Paloma
- Quai n°1 (2001–2005) – Laurence Delage
- Fabio Montale (2002) – Sonia
- La Femme du boulanger (1999) – Aurélie
- Sous le soleil (1998) – Terry
- Un homme en colère (1999) – Debbie
- Hold-up à l'italienne (2008) – Marion
- Meurtres à Aix-en-Provence (2016) – Anne Giudicelli
- Tandem (2016–2024) – Léa Soler
- Crimes parfaits (2020) – Irène Delaune

=== As director ===
- 2024: Tandem (special episode "Retour vers le passé")

== Theatre ==
- 2003: La Salle de bain – Comédie de Paris
- 2004: Les Montagnes russes – Théâtre Marigny
- 2006: The Vagina Monologues – Théâtre de Paris
- 2006: Opus Cœur – Théâtre Hébertot
- 2011: Une traversée sans histoire – Théâtre Toursky
- 2012: Ma première fois – Théâtre Michel
- 2014: Coiffure et confidences – National tour
- 2015: Mathilda – Théâtre Toursky
- 2024–2025: Et si on en parlait ? – National tour

== Music ==
- 1998: "On Prend La Route" (single), written by Félix Gray
- 2008: "Tous en scène contre la Sclérose en Plaques" concerts (Châtenay-Malabry, Troyes)

== Publications ==
- 2002: *La Salle de bain* (play)
- 2008: *Pourras-tu me pardonner ?* – Plon
- 2010: *Neuf mois dans la vie d'une femme* – Calmann-Lévy
- 2021: *Pourquoi nous ?* – Plon
