= Yarmush =

Yarmush is a surname. Notable people with the surname include:

- Martin Yarmush (born 1952), American scientist, physician, and engineer
- Michael Yarmush (born 1982), American-Canadian actor

== See also ==
- Armush
