= Davit Aghajanyan =

Armenian actor and model

- Born: Davit Aghajanyan; March 5, 1992 (age 33); Yerevan, Armenian SSR, Soviet Union
- Occupation(s): Lawyer, model, actor
- Years active: 2009–present
- Spouse: Anna Dovlatyan

Davit Aghajanyan (Armenian: Դավիթ Աղաջանյան, born on March 5, 1992), is an Armenian actor and model. He is known for his role as Tigran on Full House.

== Artistry ==
=== Influences ===
Aghajanyan has listed Leonardo DiCaprio, Al Pacino, Robert De Niro and Jack Nicholson as his biggest influences.

== Filmography ==
Television and web
Year	Title	Role	Notes
2012–2013	Hard Life	Dave	Recurring role
2015	Full House	Tigran Avetisyan	Recurring role
2016	Secret Love	Levon Karapetyan	Main Cast
2017	Alien	Arsen	Main Cast
2017 - 2018	Ellen's Diary	Aram	Main Cast

== Discography ==
=== Singles ===
==== As featured artist ====
List of singles
Title	Year	Album
"Mek Vayrkyan" (Anna Dovlatyan featuring David Aghajanyan)	2018	Non-album singles
