= List of Neon films =

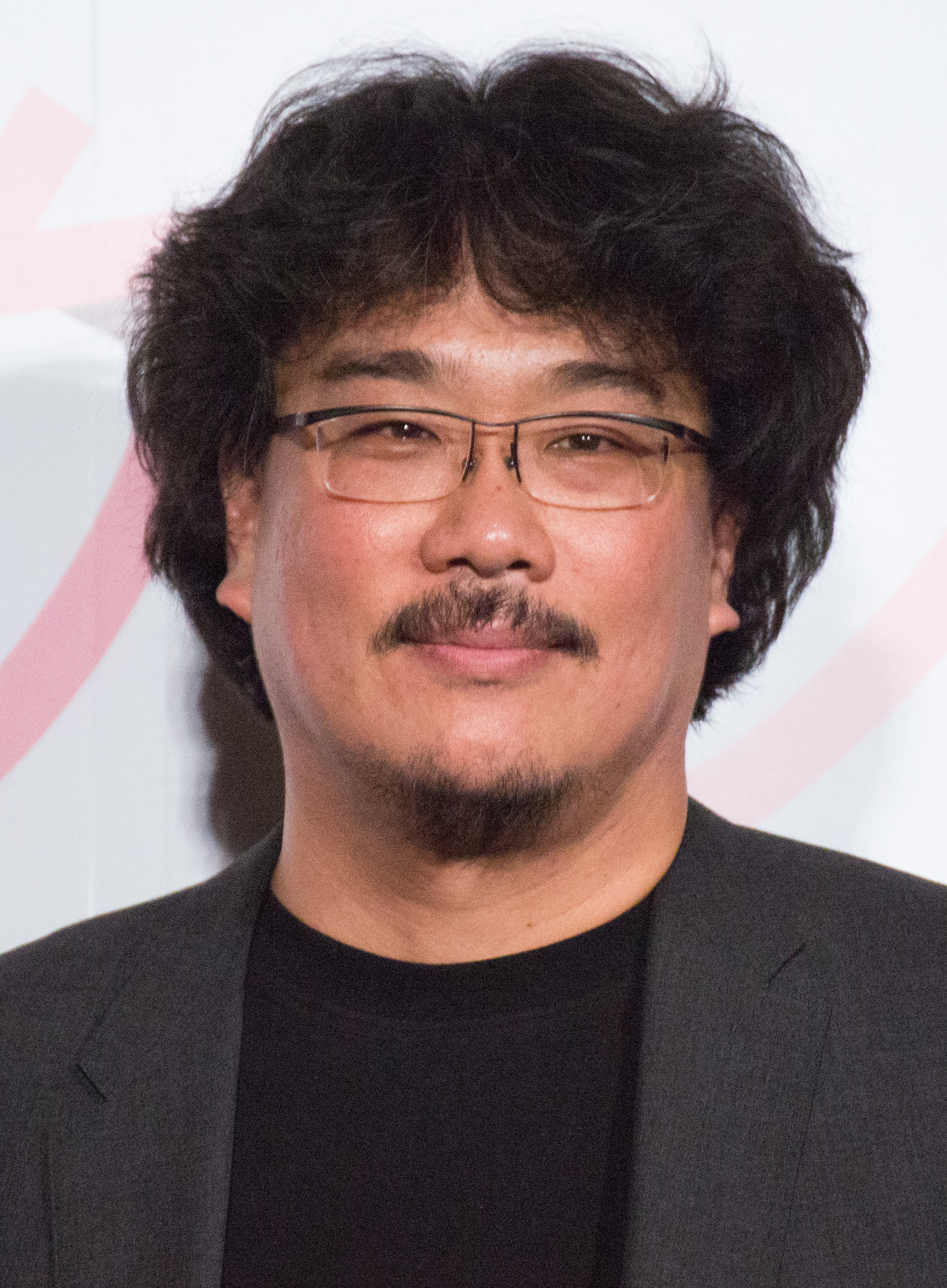
Bong Joon Ho, director of Parasite (2019), which was one of Neon's highest-grossing films at the box office with over $200 million, and won both the Palme d'Or and Academy Award for Best Picture.

This is a list of films originally produced and/or distributed theatrically by the American independent film production and distribution company Neon. The company was founded in 2017 by CEO Tom Quinn and Tim League; the latter is also the co-founder of the Alamo Drafthouse Cinema chain. Its first film, Colossal, was released on April 7, 2017.

Additionally, Neon has acquired the distribution rights to seven consecutive Palme d'Or winners at the Cannes Film Festival: Parasite (2019), Titane (2021), Triangle of Sadness (2022), Anatomy of a Fall (2023), Anora (2024), It Was Just an Accident (2025), and Fjord (2026).

Parasite is Neon's highest-grossing film with more than $200 million at the box office, and the distributor first film to win the Academy Award for Best Picture. Anora was Neon's second and most recent film to win Best Picture.

During 2017 and 2023, Neon's division Super LTD released fourteen films, mainly focused on international productions and documentaries. It's last released film was The Quiet Girl (2022), which was nominated for the Academy Award for Best International Feature Film representing Ireland.

== Released ==
=== 2010s ===
Release date	Title	Notes	Ref.
April 7, 2017	Colossal	North American theatrical distribution only	
May 5, 2017	Risk	North American theatrical distribution only	
June 23, 2017	The Bad Batch	North American distribution only; Venice Film Festival Special Jury Prize	
June 30, 2017	The B-Side: Elsa Dorfman's Portrait Photography	North American distribution only	
August 11, 2017	Ingrid Goes West	North American distribution only; Independent Spirit Award for Best First Feature	
August 25, 2017	Beach Rats	North American distribution only	
December 8, 2017	I, Tonya	U.S. co-distribution with 30West only; Nominated—Critics' Choice Movie Award for Best Comedy; Nominated—Golden Globe Award for Best Motion Picture – Musical or Comedy; Nominated—Producers Guild of America Award for Best Theatrical Motion Picture	
March 30, 2018	Gemini	U.S. distribution only	
April 13, 2018	Borg vs McEnroe	North American distribution only	
May 11, 2018	Revenge	North American theatrical and home media distribution only	
June 29, 2018	Three Identical Strangers	North American theatrical distribution only; Nominated—BAFTA Award for Best Documentary; Nominated—Critics' Choice Documentary Award for Best Documentary Feature; Nominated—Primetime Emmy Award for Exceptional Merit in Documentary Filmmaking	
July 6, 2018	Sharp Edges	Short film	
September 21, 2018	Assassination Nation	Co-distribution with Gozie AGBO and Refinery29 only	
September 28, 2018	Monsters and Men	North American distribution only; Nominated—Black Reel Award for Outstanding Independent Film	
October 26, 2018	Border	North American distribution only; Prix Un Certain Regard; Guldbagge Award for Best Film; Nominated—Goya Award for Best European Film	
November 2, 2018	Bodied	U.S. theatrical distribution only; Toronto International Film Festival People's Choice Award: Midnight Madness	
December 7, 2018	Vox Lux	U.S. distribution only; Nominated—Golden Lion	
March 1, 2019	Apollo 11	Critics' Choice Documentary Award for Best Documentary Feature; Producers Guild of America Award for Best Documentary Motion Picture; Nominated—Independent Spirit Award for Best Documentary Feature	
March 29, 2019	The Beach Bum	U.S. co-distribution with Vice Media only	
April 5, 2019	Amazing Grace	North American distribution only; NAACP Image Award for Outstanding Documentary	
April 19, 2019	Little Woods	North American distribution only	
May 10, 2019	The Biggest Little Farm	North American distribution only; Nominated—Critics' Choice Documentary Award for Best Documentary Feature	
June 21, 2019	Wild Rose	U.S. distribution only; Nominated—BIFA for Best British Independent Film	
July 26, 2019	Honeyland	North American distribution only; Critics' Choice Documentary Award for Best First Documentary Feature; National Society of Film Critics Award for Best Non-Fiction Film; New York Film Critics Circle Award for Best Non-Fiction Film; Nominated—Academy Award for Best Documentary Feature Film; Nominated—Academy Award for Best International Feature Film; Nominated—Critics' Choice Documentary Award for Best Documentary Feature	
August 2, 2019	Luce	U.S. co-distribution with Topic Studios only; Nominated—Black Reel Award for Outstanding Independent Film; Nominated—NAACP Image Award for Outstanding Independent Motion Picture	
September 13, 2019	Monos	U.S. distribution only; Nominated—British Independent Film Award for Best International Independent Film	
October 8, 2019	Little Monsters	U.S. co-distribution with Hulu only	
October 11, 2019	Parasite	North American distribution only; Academy Award for Best Picture; Academy Award for Best International Feature Film; BAFTA Award for Best Film Not in the English Language; César Award for Best Foreign Film; Critics' Choice Movie Award for Best Foreign Language Film; Golden Globe Award for Best Foreign Language Film; Independent Spirit Award for Best International Film; Palme d'Or; Saturn Award for Best International Film; Screen Actors Guild Award for Outstanding Performance by a Cast in a Motion Picture; Nominated—BAFTA Award for Best Film	
December 6, 2019	Portrait of a Lady on Fire	North American co-distribution with Hulu only; Cannes Film Festival Award for Best Screenplay; London Film Critics' Circle Award for Foreign Language Film of the Year; Queer Palm; Nominated—BAFTA Award for Best Film Not in the English Language; Nominated—César Award for Best Film; Nominated—Critics' Choice Movie Award for Best Foreign Language Film; Nominated—Golden Globe Award for Best Foreign Language Film; Nominated—Independent Spirit Award for Best International Film; Nominated—Palme d'Or	
December 27, 2019	Clemency	U.S. distribution only; Nominated—Independent Spirit Award for Best Film	

=== 2020s ===
Release date	Title	Notes	Ref.
February 7, 2020	The Lodge	U.S. distribution only	
March 13, 2020	Big Time Adolescence	North American co-distribution with Hulu only	
May 8, 2020	Spaceship Earth		
May 22, 2020	The Painter and the Thief	Nominated—Critics' Choice Documentary Award for Best Documentary Feature	
June 5, 2020	Shirley	North American distribution only	
July 10, 2020	Palm Springs	co-distribution with Hulu only Critics' Choice Movie Award for Best Comedy; Nominated—Golden Globe Award for Best Motion Picture – Musical or Comedy; Nominated—Grand Jury Prize Dramatic	
July 31, 2020	She Dies Tomorrow		
October 2, 2020	Possessor	U.S. co-distribution with Well Go USA Entertainment only	
October 13, 2020	Totally Under Control		
October 16, 2020	Bad Hair	Co-distribution with Hulu only	
October 19, 2020	Memories of Murder	Re-release, originally distributed in the U.S. by Palm Pictures	
November 13, 2020	Ammonite	North American distribution only	
January 29, 2021	Apollo 11: Quarantine	Short film	
January 29, 2021	Dear Comrades!	U.S. distribution only Venice Film Festival Special Jury Prize; Nominated—Golden Lion	
February 26, 2021	Billie Eilish: The World's a Little Blurry	U.S. theatrical distribution only	
February 26, 2021	Night of the Kings	U.S. distribution only Black Reel Award for Outstanding Foreign Film; NAACP Image Award for Outstanding International Motion Picture; Nominated—Independent Spirit Award for Best International Film	
April 16, 2021	Gunda	North American distribution only Nominated—Critics' Choice Documentary Award for Best Documentary Feature	
April 16, 2021	In the Earth	U.S. distribution only	
May 14, 2021	The Killing of Two Lovers	Nominated—Independent Spirit John Cassavetes Award	
May 21, 2021	New Order	North American distribution only Venice Film Festival Grand Jury Prize; Nominated—Golden Lion	
July 16, 2021	Pig	U.S. distribution only Nominated—Gotham Independent Film Award for Best Feature	
July 23, 2021	Ailey	North American distribution only	
September 3, 2021	The Year of the Everlasting Storm		
October 1, 2021	Titane	North American distribution only Palme d'Or; Toronto International Film Festival People's Choice Award: Midnight Madness; Nominated—European Film Award for Best Film; Nominated—Gotham Independent Film Award for Best International Feature; Nominated—Queer Palm	
November 5, 2021	Spencer	U.S. co-distribution with Topic Studios only Nominated—Golden Lion	
November 19, 2021	The First Wave	U.S. theatrical and home media distribution only Nominated—Producers Guild of America Award for Best Documentary Motion Picture	
December 3, 2021	Flee	North American co-distribution with Participant only Annie Award for Best Animated Feature – Independent; British Independent Film Award for Best International Independent Film; Cinema Eye Honor for Outstanding Non-Fiction Feature; Cristal Award for Best Feature Film; European Film Award for Best Documentary; European Film Award for Best Animated Feature Film; Gotham Independent Film Award for Best Documentary; Los Angeles Film Critics Association Award for Best Animated Film; National Society of Film Critics Award for Best Non-Fiction Film; New York Film Critics Circle Award for Best Non-Fiction Film; Nominated—Academy Award for Best Animated Feature; Nominated—Academy Award for Best Documentary Feature Film; Nominated—Academy Award for Best International Feature Film; Nominated—BAFTA Award for Best Animated Film; Nominated—BAFTA Award for Best Documentary; Nominated—Critics' Choice Documentary Award for Best Documentary Feature; Nominated—Critics' Choice Movie Award for Best Animated Feature; Nominated—Critics' Choice Movie Award for Best Foreign Language Film; Nominated—Golden Globe Award for Best Animated Feature Film; Nominated—Independent Spirit Award for Best Documentary Feature	
December 26, 2021	Memoria	North American distribution only Jury Prize (Cannes Film Festival); Nominated—Palme d'Or	
February 4, 2022	The Worst Person in the World	U.S. distribution only British Independent Film Award for Best International Independent Film; New York Film Critics Circle Award for Best Foreign Language Film; Nominated—Academy Award for Best International Feature Film; Nominated—BAFTA Award for Best Film Not in the English Language; Nominated—César Award for Best Foreign Film; Nominated—Critics' Choice Movie Award for Best Foreign Language Film; Nominated—Palme d'Or; Nominated—Toronto Film Critics Association Award for Best Foreign Language Film	
April 22, 2022	Petite Maman	North American distribution only Los Angeles Film Critics Association Award for Best Foreign Language Film; Nominated—BAFTA Award for Best Film Not in the English Language; Nominated—British Independent Film Award for Best International Independent Film; Nominated—Golden Bear; Nominated—Independent Spirit Award for Best International Film; Nominated—Toronto Film Critics Association Award for Best Foreign Language Film	
May 13, 2022	Pleasure	U.S. distribution only Nominated—British Independent Film Award for Best International Independent Film	
May 27, 2022	A Chiara	North American distribution only Nominated—Independent Spirit Award for Best Film	
June 3, 2022	Crimes of the Future	U.S. distribution only Nominated—Palme d'Or	
June 24, 2022	Beba		
July 6, 2022	Fire of Love	U.S. theatrical and home media distribution only Critics' Choice Documentary Award for Best Documentary Feature (Silver); Nominated—Academy Award for Best Documentary Feature Film; Nominated—BAFTA Award for Best Documentary	
September 16, 2022	Moonage Daydream	U.S. distribution only Nominated—BAFTA Award for Best Documentary; Nominated—Critics' Choice Documentary Award for Best Documentary Feature; Nominated—Queer Palm	
October 7, 2022	Triangle of Sadness	North American distribution only European Film Award for Best Film; Palme d'Or; Nominated—Academy Award for Best Picture; Nominated—César Award for Best Foreign Film; Nominated—Critics' Choice Movie Award for Best Comedy; Nominated—Golden Globe Award for Best Motion Picture – Musical or Comedy	
November 23, 2022	All the Beauty and the Bloodshed	North American theatrical distribution Golden Lion; Independent Spirit Award for Best Documentary Feature; London Film Critics' Circle Award for Documentary of the Year; Los Angeles Film Critics Association Award for Best Documentary Film; National Society of Film Critics Award for Best Non-Fiction Film; New York Film Critics Circle Award for Best Non-Fiction Film; Nominated—Academy Award for Best Documentary Feature Film; Nominated—BAFTA Award for Best Documentary; Nominated—British Independent Film Award for Best International Independent Film; Nominated—Critics' Choice Documentary Award for Best Political Documentary	
December 26, 2022	Broker	North American distribution only Nominated—Palme d'Or	
January 27, 2023	Infinity Pool	U.S. distribution only Nominated—Hollywood Critics Association Midseason Film Award for Best Horror Film	
March 31, 2023	Bait	North American distribution only BAFTA Award for Outstanding Debut by a British Writer, Director or Producer	
March 31, 2023	Enys Men	North American distribution only	
April 7, 2023	How to Blow Up a Pipeline		
May 19, 2023	Robots	U.S. and Caribbean distribution only	
May 19, 2023	Sanctuary	U.S. distribution only	
August 16, 2023	Oldboy	20th anniversary re-release, originally distributed in the U.S. by Tartan Films USA	
September 22, 2023	It Lives Inside		
October 6, 2023	The Royal Hotel	North American distribution only Nominated—AACTA Award for Best Film	
October 13, 2023	Anatomy of a Fall	North American distribution only César Award for Best Film; Critics' Choice Movie Award for Best Foreign Language Film; European Film Award for Best Film; Golden Globe Award for Best Foreign Language Film; Gotham Independent Film Award for Best International Feature; Independent Spirit Award for Best International Film; Los Angeles Film Critics Association Award for Best Foreign Language Film; Lumière Award for Best Film; National Board of Review Award for Best International Film; New York Film Critics Circle Award for Best Foreign Language Film; Palme d'Or; Nominated—Academy Award for Best Picture; Nominated—BAFTA Award for Best Film; Nominated—BAFTA Award for Best Film Not in the English Language; Nominated—Golden Globe Award for Best Motion Picture – Drama; Nominated—Queer Palm	
November 10, 2023	Perfect Days	North American distribution only Prize of the Ecumenical Jury (Cannes); Nominated—Academy Award for Best International Feature Film; Nominated—César Award for Best Foreign Film; Nominated—Critics' Choice Movie Award for Best Foreign Language Film; Nominated—Japan Academy Film Prize for Picture of the Year; Nominated—Palme d'Or	
November 10, 2023	Robot Dreams	North American distribution only Annie Award for Best Animated Feature – Independent; European Film Award for Best Animated Feature Film; Gaudí Award for Best Animated Film; Goya Award for Best Animated Film; Toronto Film Critics Association Award for Best Animated Film; Nominated—Academy Award for Best Animated Feature	
December 1, 2023	Eileen	North American distribution only	
December 8, 2023	La chimera	North American distribution only Nominated—Palme d'Or	
December 8, 2023	Origin	Nominated—Black Reel Award for Outstanding Film; Nominated—Golden Lion	
December 25, 2023	Ferrari	U.S. distribution only Nominated—Golden Lion	
January 3, 2024	Self Reliance	Limited release for one night, U.S. co-distribution with Hulu and Paramount Global Content Distribution only	
March 22, 2024	Immaculate	U.S. distribution only	
April 19, 2024	Stress Positions		
May 17, 2024	Babes	North American distribution only	
May 31, 2024	Handling the Undead	North American, U.K. and Irish distribution only	
June 13, 2024	Brats	Distributed by Hulu	
July 12, 2024	Longlegs	North American distribution only	
July 26, 2024	Mothers' Instinct	U.S. distribution only	
August 9, 2024	Cuckoo		
August 30, 2024	Seeking Mavis Beacon		
October 8, 2024	Bad Actor: A Hollywood Ponzi Scheme		
October 18, 2024	Anora	North American distribution only Academy Award for Best Picture; Critics' Choice Movie Award for Best Picture; Independent Spirit Award for Best Feature; Los Angeles Film Critics Association Award for Best Film; Palme d'Or; Satellite Award for Best Motion Picture – Musical or Comedy; Nominated—BAFTA Award for Best Film; Nominated—Golden Globe Award for Best Motion Picture – Musical or Comedy	
November 27, 2024	The Seed of the Sacred Fig	North American distribution only National Board of Review Award for Best International Film; Special Prize (Cannes); Nominated—Academy Award for Best International Feature Film; Nominated—BAFTA Award for Best Film Not in the English Language; Nominated—Critics' Choice Movie Award for Best Foreign Language Film; Nominated—European Film Award for Best Film; Nominated—Golden Globe Award for Best Foreign Language Film; Nominated—Palme d'Or	
December 6, 2024	The End	North American distribution only	
December 27, 2024	2073		
January 24, 2025	Presence		
February 21, 2025	The Monkey	U.S. distribution only	
March 14, 2025	The Actor	North American distribution only	
April 4, 2025	Hell of a Summer	U.S. distribution only	
May 30, 2025	Men of War		
June 6, 2025	The Life of Chuck	North American distribution only Toronto International Film Festival People's Choice Award	
July 30, 2025	Together		
August 22, 2025	Splitsville	Nominated - Critics' Choice Movie Award for Best Comedy	
October 3, 2025	Orwell: 2+2=5	North American distribution only Nominated – Critics' Choice Documentary Award for Best Documentary Feature; Nominated – L'Œil d'or	
October 15, 2025	It Was Just an Accident	North American distribution only Gotham Independent Film Award for Best International Feature; National Board of Review Award for Best International Film; Palme d'Or; Nominated – Academy Award for Best International Feature Film; Nominated – BAFTA Award for Best Film Not in the English Language; Nominated – Critics' Choice Movie Award for Best Foreign Language Film; Nominated –Golden Globe Award for Best Foreign Language Film; Nominated – Golden Globe Award for Best Motion Picture – Drama	
October 24, 2025	Shelby Oaks		
November 7, 2025	Sentimental Value	North American distribution only Academy Award for Best International Feature Film; BAFTA Award for Best Film Not in the English Language; Grand Prix (Cannes Film Festival); Nominated – Academy Award for Best Picture; Nominated – BAFTA Award for Best Film; Nominated – British Independent Film Award for Best International Independent Film; Nominated – Critics' Choice Movie Award for Best Foreign Language Film; Nominated – European Film Award for Best Film; Nominated –Golden Globe Award for Best Foreign Language Film; Nominated – Golden Globe Award for Best Motion Picture – Drama; Nominated – Palme d'Or	
November 14, 2025	Keeper		
November 14, 2025	Arco	North American, U.K. and Irish distribution only; Annie Award for Best Animated Feature – Independent; Cristal Award for Best Feature Film; Nominated – Academy Award for Best Animated Feature; Nominated – BAFTA Award for Best Children's & Family Film; Nominated – Critics' Choice Movie Award for Best Animated Feature; Nominated – European Film Award for Best Animated Film; Nominated – Golden Globe Award for Best Animated Feature Film	
November 26, 2025	The Secret Agent	North American distribution only; Critics' Choice Movie Award for Best Foreign Language Film; Golden Globe Award for Best Foreign Language Film; Independent Spirit Award for Best International Film; Los Angeles Film Critics Association Award for Best Foreign Language Film; National Society of Film Critics Award for Best Foreign Language Film; New York Film Critics Circle Award for Best Foreign Language Film; Nominated – Academy Award for Best Picture; Nominated – Academy Award for Best International Feature Film; Nominated – BAFTA Award for Best Film Not in the English Language; Nominated – Golden Globe Award for Best Motion Picture – Drama	
December 25, 2025	No Other Choice	North American distribution only International People's Choice Award (TIFF); Nominated – Critics' Choice Movie Award for Best Foreign Language Film; Nominated –Golden Globe Award for Best Foreign Language Film; Nominated – Golden Globe Award for Best Motion Picture – Musical or Comedy; Nominated – Golden Lion	
February 6, 2026	Sirāt	North American distribution only Jury Prize (Cannes Film Festival); Toronto Film Critics Association Award for Best Foreign Language Film; Nominated – Academy Award for Best International Feature Film; Nominated – BAFTA Award for Best Film Not in the English Language; Nominated – Critics' Choice Movie Award for Best Foreign Language Film; Nominated – European Film Award for Best Film; Nominated – Golden Globe Award for Best Foreign Language Film; Nominated – Palme d'Or	
February 13, 2026	Nirvanna the Band the Show the Movie	distribution outside Canada only	
February 27, 2026	EPiC: Elvis Presley in Concert	North American distribution only Critics' Choice Documentary Award for Best Music Documentary	
March 27, 2026	Alpha	North American distribution only Nominated – Palme d'Or; Nominated – Queer Palm	
April 10, 2026	The Christophers	North American distribution only	
April 10, 2026	Exit 8	North American distribution only	
May 1, 2026	Hokum		
May 22, 2026	I Love Boosters		
June 19, 2026	Leviticus	distribution outside Australia and New Zealand only	
July 24, 2026	Her Private Hell		
July 24, 2026	Sheep in the Box	North American, U.K., Irish, Australian and New Zealand distribution only Nominated – Palme d'Or	
August 14, 2026	The Wrong Girls		
August 21, 2026	It Ends		
September 9, 2026	Hope	North American, U.K., Irish, Australian and New Zealand distribution only Nominated - Palme d'Or	
September 30, 2026	NAZA	U.S. co-distribution with The Guardian and MK2 Films only Critics' Choice Documentary Award for Best Political Documentary; Special Jury Prize (Venice Film Festival); Nominated – Critics' Choice Documentary Award for Best Documentary Feature; Nominated – European Film Award for Best Documentary; Nominated – Golden Lion	
October 9, 2026	Fjord	North American, U.K., Irish, Australian and New Zealand distribution only Palme d'Or; Nominated – European Film Award for Best Film	
October 16, 2026	Once Upon a Time in Harlem	U.S., U.K. and Irish distribution only Critics' Choice Documentary Award for Best Archival Documentary; Critics' Choice Documentary Award for Best Historical Documentary; Nominated – Critics' Choice Documentary Award for Best Documentary Feature	
November 13, 2026	Paper Tiger	North American, U.K. and Irish distribution only Nominated - Palme d'Or	

== Upcoming ==
Release date	Title	Notes	Ref.
November 25, 2026	All of a Sudden	North American distribution only Nominated - Palme d'Or	
December 11, 2026	Clarissa		
December 25, 2026	Artificial		
April 23, 2027	A Place in Hell	U.S. distribution only	

=== Undated films ===
Year	Title	Notes	Ref.
2026	The Unknown	North American distribution only Nominated - Palme d'Or	
2027	Ally	North American distribution only	
2027	King Snake	U.S. distribution only	
TBA	4 X 4: The Event		
TBA	70 Up	North American distribution only	
TBA	Bad Lieutenant: Tokyo		
TBA	Brides	North American distribution only	
TBA	Samo Lives		
TBA	They Follow	North American distribution only	
TBA	The Young People		

=== In development ===
Title	Notes	Ref.
Cassandra at the Wedding		
I Want My MTV		
Lust		
Mora		
Untitled Matt Johnson film		
Untitled film based on SCP Foundation		

== Super LTD ==
Release date	Title	Notes	Ref.
October 13, 2017	Wasted! The Story of Food Waste	U.S. distribution only	
February 2, 2018	Before We Vanish	North American distribution only	
May 4, 2018	Racer and the Jailbird	North American distribution only	
August 31, 2018	Active Measures	U.S. distribution only	
June 7, 2019	This One's for the Ladies	U.S. distribution only	
August 21, 2020	You Cannot Kill David Arquette	North American distribution only	
January 29, 2021	Notturno	North American distribution only; Nominated—Golden Lion	
March 5, 2021	Quo Vadis, Aida?	North American distribution only; European Film Award for Best Film; Independent Spirit Award for Best International Film; Nominated—Academy Award for Best International Feature Film; Nominated—BAFTA Award for Best Film Not in the English Language	
June 4, 2021	All Light, Everywhere	North American distribution only	
January 28, 2022	GameStop: Rise of the Players	North American distribution only	
February 18, 2022	Ted K	North American distribution only	
August 19, 2022	Three Minutes: A Lengthening	North American distribution only; Nominated—Critics' Choice Documentary Award for Best First Documentary Feature	
January 13, 2023	Saint Omer	U.S. distribution only; Black Reel Award for Outstanding Foreign Film; César Award for Best First Feature Film; Venice Film Festival Grand Jury Prize; Nominated—Golden Lion; Nominated—Gotham Independent Film Award for Best International Feature; Nominated—Independent Spirit Award for Best International Film	
February 24, 2023	The Quiet Girl	North American distribution only; Irish Film and Television Award for Best Film; London Film Critics' Circle Award for Foreign Language Film of the Year; Nominated—Academy Award for Best International Feature Film; Nominated—BAFTA Award for Best Film Not in the English Language	
