= Boston Society of Film Critics Awards 2024 =

Annual US film awards ceremony

45th BSFC Awards

December 8, 2024

Best Film:
Anora

The 45th Boston Society of Film Critics Awards, honoring the best in filmmaking in 2024, were given on December 8, 2024. Unlike previous editions of the awards, runner-up standings were not revealed.

Anora received the most awards with three, including Best Film. Other multiple winners were The Brutalist and A Complete Unknown with two awards each. The meeting to decide the winners honored BSFC founder David Brudnoy, marking the 20th anniversary of his passing.

== Winners ==
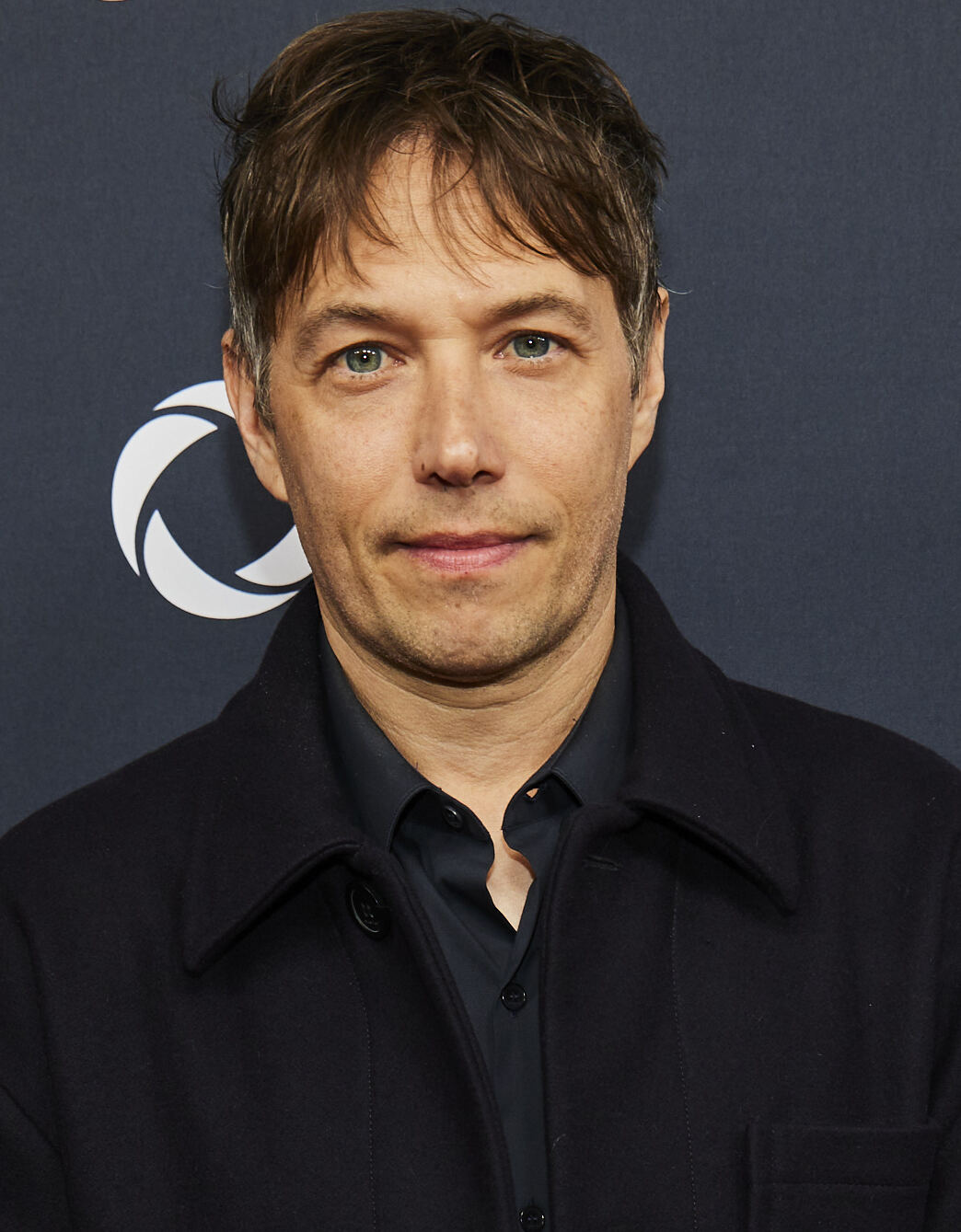
Sean Baker, Best Director and Best Original Screenplay winner

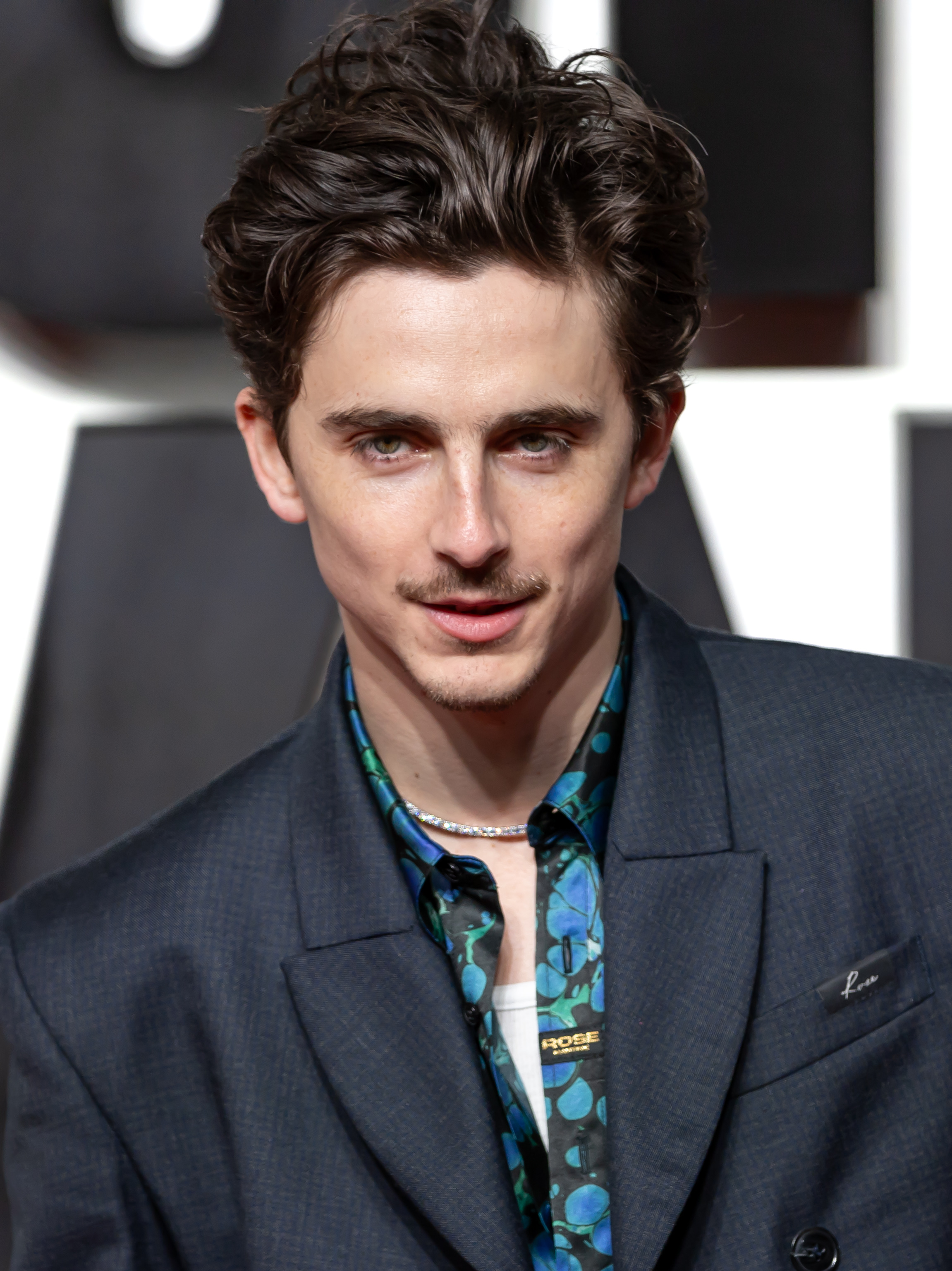
Timothée Chalamet, Best Actor winner

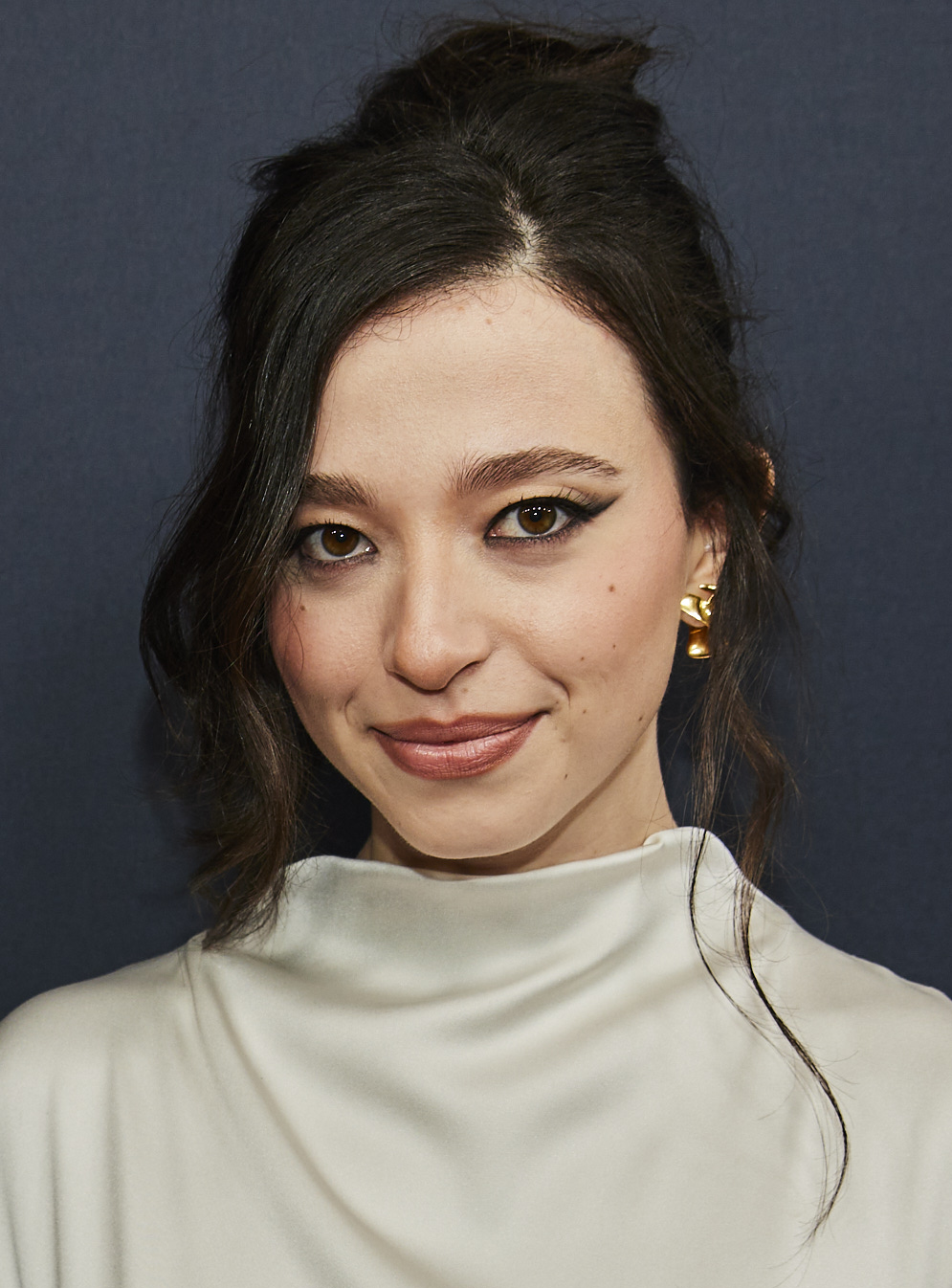
Mikey Madison, Best Actress winner

- Best Film:
  - Anora
- Best Director:
  - Sean Baker – Anora
- Best Actor:
  - Timothée Chalamet – A Complete Unknown
- Best Actress:
  - Mikey Madison – Anora
- Best Supporting Actor:
  - Edward Norton – A Complete Unknown
- Best Supporting Actress:
  - Danielle Deadwyler – The Piano Lesson
- Best Ensemble Cast:
  - Sing Sing
- Best Original Screenplay:
  - Anora – Sean Baker
- Best Adapted Screenplay:
  - Nickel Boys – RaMell Ross and Joslyn Barnes
- Best Cinematography:
  - The Brutalist – Lol Crawley
- Best Film Editing:
  - Challengers – Marco Costa
- Best Original Score:
  - The Brutalist – Daniel Blumberg
- Best Documentary Film:
  - No Other Land
- Best Non-English Language Film:
  - Do Not Expect Too Much from the End of the World (Romania)
- Best Animated Film:
  - Flow
- Best New Filmmaker:
  - Annie Baker – Janet Planet
