= Armush =

Armenian actor, comedian, and showman

- Born: Արման Խաչատրյան Arman Khachatryan; 18 March 1977 (age 48); Yerevan, Armenian SSR, Soviet Union
- Occupation(s): Actor, comedian, showman, presenter
- Years active: 2005–present

Arman Mamikoni Khachatryan (Armenian: Արման Մամիկոնի Խաչատրյան; born 18 March 1977), better known by his stage name Armush (Armenian: Արմուշ), is an Armenian actor, comedian, and showman. In 2005, Arman joined several other comedians—largely unknown to the public—to form 32 Teeth (32 ատամ) comedy show. In 2010, Arman and his friends created the Vitamin Club (Վիտամին ակումբ) stand-up comedy TV show, which was broadcast by Shant TV every week until 2015.

== Filmography ==
Armush has appeared in the following movies:

- Alabalanica (2011)
- Love Odd (2015)

Television and web
| Year | Title | Role | Notes |
|---|---|---|---|
| 2007 | Two Stars (Երկու աստղ) | Singer | with Shicker |
| 2015–2016 | Stone Cage | Gogo | Main Cast |

Himself
| Year | Title | Notes |
|---|---|---|
| 2006–2010 | 32 Atam (32 ատամ) | Comedy TV show |
| 2006–2007 | Like Tars (Թարսի պես) | Comedy TV show |
| 2010–2015 | Vitamin Club | Comedy TV show |
