= Vendetta (TV series) =

Armenian romantic drama television series

- Genre: Romance drama
- Starring: Levon Ayvazyan; Hayk Chomoyan; Lyusine Vardanyan; Narek Ter-Matevosyan; Djon Makaryan; Elina Petrosyan; Anoushik Arakelyan; Tamara Charkhiphalakyan; Narek Petrosyan; Grigor Hakobyan
- Country of origin: Armenia
- Original language: Armenian
- No. of seasons: 1

Production
- Producer: Edgar Avakian
- Production locations: Yerevan, Armenia
- Running time: 40–42 minutes

Original release
- Network: Shant TV
- Release: July 25, 2016

Vendetta (Armenian: Վենդետտա Vendetta) is an Armenian romantic drama television series. The series premiered on Shant TV on July 25, 2016.

Most of the series took place in Yerevan, Armenia.
