= Vitamin Club =

- Վիտամին Ակումբ
- Country of origin: Armenia
- Original language: Armenian
- No. of seasons: 4
- No. of episodes: 199

Production
- Production locations: Yerevan, Armenia
- Production company: Vitamin Production

Original release
- Network: Shant TV
- Release: August 13, 2010 – March 28, 2015

Vitamin Club (Armenian: Վիտամին Ակումբ, romanized: Vitamin Akumb) is an Armenian stand-up comedy television show, broadcast by Shant TV from 13 August 2010 to 28 March 2015.

== History ==
Vitamin Club was announced in June 2010, when most of former 32 Teeth residents left because of specific reasons, such as producers ambitions, internal misunderstandings and minor dramas. Also in a press conference, they announced that the show will be produced under «Vi-Lit» LLC, which meant separation from the former program.

According to their first episode, which consisted of one of the sketches telling Vitamin Club's creation, they created the club's name, logo and appearance, making it as a fresh breathe on a new show. But one of the closed Armenian news site Iravaban.am claimed that the real reason of the former program dissolving was the result of uncomfortable conditions of actors, rejection by Armenia 1, Armenia TV and their former broadcasters, and too high ambitious behavior.

In 2022, the place where the show was hosted was turned into the first ever Hard Rock Cafe in Armenia, and currently hosts the Women's Club show.

== Production ==
The show mostly took its programs from 32 Teeth: guests presentation, multivitamins (which renamed from Comixes), parodies of celebrities, guests of programs and anything social in general. Also Vitamin Club included long subjects, which could include fictional characters, beloved by viewers.

== Members ==
Majority of Vitamin Club's members were those who participated in 32 Teeth show, and their long-time residents and founders of Vitamin Club:

- Garik Papoyan
- Vache Tovmasyan
- Aram Mp3 (Sargsyan)
- Armush
- Charents (Karen Sahakyan)
- Tigran Gevorgyan

Also, starting from 2011, the cast of Vitamin Club also included newer members, such as:

- Ponch
- Grig Gevorgyan
- Bony (Vahe Beglaryan)
- Mher Mkhitaryan
- Van Khachatryan
