= Alien (Armenian TV series) =

- Օտարը
- Genre: Crime drama melodrama
- Developed by: Mher Khachatryan
- Composer: Hayk Hunanyan
- Country of origin: Armenia
- Original language: Armenian
- No. of seasons: 1
- No. of episodes: 99

Production
- Producer: Hunan Soghoyan
- Production locations: Yerevan, Armenia
- Running time: 42-47 minutes 71 minutes (pilot)

Original release
- Network: Shant TV and Shant Premium
- Release: March 13 – July 28, 2017

Alien, also known as The Stranger (Armenian: Օտարը Otary), is an Armenian romantic melodrama television series. The series started on Shant Premium on March 13, 2017. It premiered on Shant TV on September 18, 2017 and airs every workday at 8:00 (PM).

Most of the series took place in Yerevan, Armenia.

== Premise ==
Gor, Neneth, and Arsen are close friends and they study in the same school. Each of them has their own feelings that are not open even to their closest friends. When Gor finds out about the love between Arsen and Neneth, everything changes because he is also in love with her. Gor's father is arrested, for undisclosed reasons, and Gor is burdened with the responsibility of taking care of his family. Confronted with difficulties early in life, he has a fateful choice to make: to become the reason of Neneth and Arsen's separation, or to free the way for his friends' romance. The story woven around the three friends' parents is a dark curtain hiding unexpected secrets. The film is a story unfolding around the love triangle of the three characters in which the heroes will have to fight for happiness, understanding that nothing is given without a fight.

== Cast and characters ==
=== Main cast ===
- Gayane Balyan
- Hovak Galoyan
- Ruzan Mesropyan
- Suren Tumasyan
- Nelli Kheranyan
- Sisian Sephanyan as Gor
- Marinka Khachatryan as Neneth
- Davit Aghajanyan as Arsen
- Davit Hakobyan
- Mariam Adamyan
- Murad Nadiryan
- Marianna Gevorgyan
- Robert Hakobyan
- Luiza Karapetyan as Maya
- Ani Petrosyan
- Armen Margaryan
