= Golden School =

- Genre: sitcom
- Based on: A True Story
- Developed by: Vache Tovmasyan
- Starring: Vache Tovmasyan; Sergey Sargsyan; Anna Grigoryan; Lala Mnacakanyan; Vahe Petrosyan; Gevorg Dodozyan; Alla Vardanyan; Ashot Meloyan; Liana Hakobyan; Ilona Nurbekyan; Hayk Muradyan; Gosh Hakobyan; Ermina Zaxarova; Mher Mkhitaryan; Vahe Beglaryan; Eva Zohrabyan; Armen Balabanyan; Hovhannes Sargsyan
- Country of origin: Armenia
- Original language: Armenian
- No. of seasons: 3
- No. of episodes: 24-25

Production
- Producer: Vache Tovmasyan
- Production locations: Yerevan, Armenia
- Running time: 25-35 minutes
- Production company: Yerevan Productions

Original release
- Network: Armenia Premium
- Release: 17 October 2017 – 31 December 2018

Related
- Ulysses S. Grant High School

Golden School (Armenian: Ոսկե Դպրոց, Voske Dprots) is an Armenian situation comedy television series developed by Vache Tovmasyan. The series premiered on Armenia Premium on 17 October 2017, and since then the series air on Tuesdays and Thursdays at 21:00.

The series mostly took place in a school in Yerevan.

== Premise ==
A robber (Robert Tovmasyan) hides stolen gold at a construction site while escaping from the police. Five years later, when he is finally released from prison, he finds out that a school was built on top of the site of the buried gold. In order to find the gold, he becomes a teacher at the school. However, he falls in love with an English teacher and the flow of the series completely changes.

== Cast and characters ==
- Vache Tovmasyan as Robert Tovmasyan, Armenian history teacher
- Sergey Sargsyan as Sirak Mnacakanyan, Maths teacher
- Anna Grigoryan as Lusine Yesayan, English teacher
- Lala Mnatsakanyan as Karakhanyan, Deputy director of the school
- Vahe Petrosyan as Ando, Robert's best friend
- Gevorg Dodozyan as Jora, Warden of the school
- Alla Vardanyan as S. Hakobyan, Director of the school
- Ashot Meloyan as Menua Drtatyan, Geography teacher
- Liana Hakobyan as Elya Ananyan, Armenian language teacher
