= Overview of Abroad =

Armenian comedy television series

- Genre: Comedy drama
- Country of origin: Armenia
- Original languages: Armenian, Russian
- No. of seasons: 2
- No. of episodes: 106

Production
- Producer: Hunan Soghoyan
- Production locations: Yerevan, Armenia
- Editor: Khoren Tevanyan Levon Beglaryan
- Running time: 30-35 minutes

Original release
- Network: Shant TV
- Release: April 11, 2015 – June 26, 2016

Overview of Abroad (Armenian: Խոպանի տեսություն Khopani Tesutyun) is an Armenian comedy drama television series. The series premiered on Shant TV on April 11, 2015.

The series took place in Yerevan.

== Cast and characters ==
- Hayk Petrosyan portrays Rubik (seasons 1– 2) Single boy, sister of Asha, son of Mareta
- Ani Malyan portrays Syuzi (Seasons 1- 2) Sister of Tina, daughter of Anna
- Anahit Kirakosyan portrays Hayarpi (Seasons 1- 2) Relative from village, who has come to Yerevan for studying
- Anais Sardaryan portrays Tina (seasons 1- 2) Daughter of Anna, sister of Syuzi
- Hakob Qishmiryan portrays Ashot (Second part of seasons 1) Husband of Asha
- Manana Gevorgyan portrays Asha (Seasons 1- 2) Wife of Ashot, sister of Rubik and daughter of Mareta
- Arshaluys Avetisyan portrays Eva (Seasons 1- 2) Grandmother of Rubik, Syuzi, Tina and Asha, mother of Saqo and Suro
- Zara Sahakyan portrays Marieta "Sirun Mareta" (Seasons 1- present) Mother of Rubik and Asha, wife of Saqo
- Ani Petrosyan portrays Anna (Seasons 1- 2) Mother of Tina and Syuzi, wife of Suro
- Andranik Harutyunyan portrays Suro (Seasons 2) Father of Tina and Syuzi, husband of Anna, son of Eva
- Iveta Yedigaryan portrays Stella (Seasons 2) Neighbour
- Kseniya Enyutina portrays Yulya (First part of seasons 1) Russian speaking ex-wife of Saqo
- Saqo (Seasons 1-2, Voice only) Husband of Marieta, father of Rubik and Asha, brother of Suro, son of Eva
- - portrays Leonid (Seasons 1- 2, Recurring) Love interest of Eva
- - portrays Michael (Seasons 1- 2, Guest) Brother of Hayarpi
