= Vache Tovmasyan =

Armenian actor, comedian, and showman

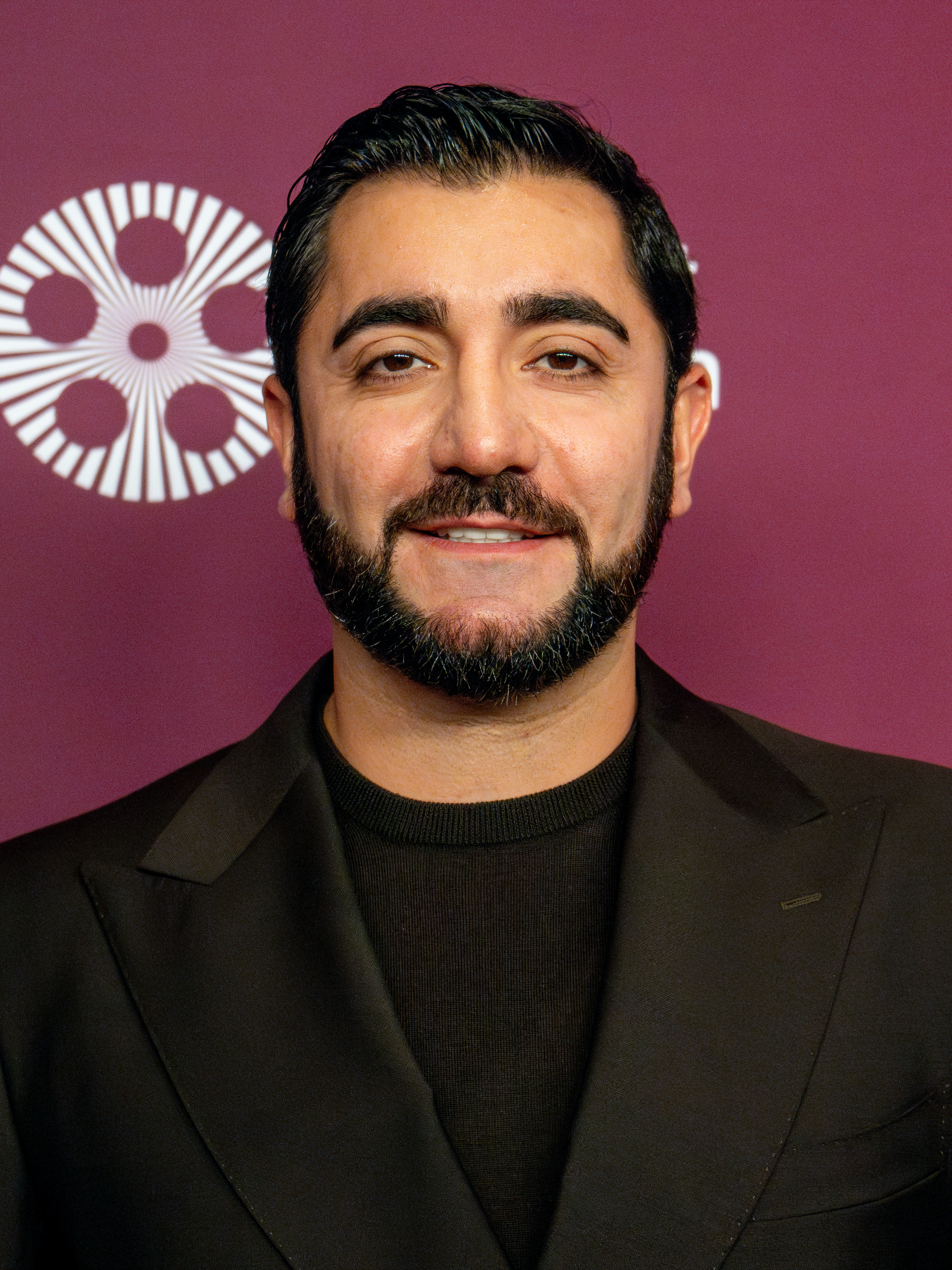
- Vache in 2024
- Born: Vachagan Tovmasyan; 15 July 1986 (age 38); Yerevan, Armenian SSR, Soviet Union
- Education: Armenian State University of Economics
- Occupation(s): Actor, comedian, showman, presenter, producer, screenwriter
- Years active: 2005–present
- Website: vachetovmasyan.com

Vachagan Kareni Tovmasyan (Armenian: Վաչագան Կարենի Թովմասյան; born 15 July 1986), known professionally as Vache Tovmasyan (Armenian: Վաչե Թովմասյան), is an Armenian actor, comedian, and showman. In 2005, Vache joined several other comedians—largely unknown to the public—to form 32 Teeth (32 ատամ) comedy show. In 2010, Vache and his friends created the Vitamin Club (Վիտամին ակումբ) stand-up comedy TV show, which was broadcast by Shant TV every week until 2015. He also played in the Armenian series called Stone cage [Qare Dard].

Tovmasyan portrayed Garnik in the 2024 film Anora, for which he was nominated for the Screen Actors Guild Award for Outstanding Performance by a Cast in a Motion Picture.

== Filmography ==
Film
| Year | Title | Role | Ref. |
|---|---|---|---|
| 2012 | Lost & Found in Armenia | Bldo | |
| 2024 | Anora | Garnik | |

Television and web
| Year | Title | Role | Notes | Ref. |
|---|---|---|---|---|
| 2009 | In The Army (Բանակում) | Tigran Sahakyan | | |
| 2011–2012 | Gerdastane (Գերդաստանը) | Alfred | Recurring cast | |
| 2015–2017 | Stone Cage | Moso | Main cast | |
| 2017–2018 | Golden School | Robert | Main cast | |
| 2019 | Coocoorooz | Himself | Producer, actor | |
| 2019–2020 | Sing if you can | | Host, showman | |
| 2020–present | Tovmasyan's Reality Show | | Author, producer and actor | |

Himself
| Year | Title | Notes | Ref. |
|---|---|---|---|
| 2006–2010 | 32 Atam (32 ատամ) | Comedy TV show | |
| 2010–2015 | Vitamin Club | Comedy TV show | |
| 2009–2010 | 3 walls (3 պատ) | Comedy TV show | |
| 2010 | Good Morning (բարի լույս) | Host | |
