= Stranger's Soul =

- Genre: Melodrama, Mystery, Romance, Fantasy, Suspense
- Based on: En otra piel
- Developed by: Roman Musheghyan
- Country of origin: Armenia
- Original language: Armenian
- No. of seasons: 1
- No. of episodes: 162

Production
- Production locations: Yerevan, Armenia
- Running time: 42 minutes

Original release
- Network: Shant TV
- Release: August 31, 2015 – April 22, 2016

Stranger's Soul (Armenian: Ուրիշի հոգին Ourishi hogin) is an Armenian romantic melodrama television series, which was based on the Spanish-language telenovela En otra piel. The series premiered on Shant TV on August 31, 2015. The series took place in Yerevan, Armenia. The directors were Armen Mirzoyan and Hayk Vardanyan, and the co-directors were Erik Ghukasyan and Meri Arakelyan.

== Cast and characters ==
Actor/Actress	Character(s)
Anna Gevorgyan; Anna Harutyunyan	Astghik Gasparyan / Maria Baveyan
Ashot Ter-Matevosyan	Arsen Karapetyan
Sofya Poghosyan	Yeva Baveyan /Manoushyan/
Narek Makaryan	Vahagn Ghandilyan
Yelena Borisenko	Maria Baveyan /Manoushyan/
Ovsanna Minasyan; Anna Dovlatyan	Arina Baveyan
Seda Shahnazaryan	Emili Baveyan
Tatever Khanjyan	Laura Manushyan

=== Recurring cast ===
Actor	Character	Notes
Levon Ghazaryan	Karlos Yazinchyan	
Movses Yeremyan	Gor Barseghyan	Friend of Arina, assistant of Khoren
Hayk Hovhannisyan	Gagik Barseghyan	
Tigran Mnacakanyan	Khoren / Mushegh Baveyan	Brother of Mushegh, uncle of Arina and Emili
Ani Mikayelyan	Aida	Housemaid of Baveyan's
Syuzan Papyan	Araksya Barseghyan	Second housemaid of Baveyan's, mother of Gor ad Gagik, ex-wife of Abgar
Hayk Torosyan	Abgar Barseghyan	Ex-husband of Araksya, father of Gor and Gagik
Satenik Hazaryan	Alla Marutyan	presenter, mutual friend of Maria
Asia Hovsepyan	Vika	waitress, lives in Djulik's home
Lusine Poghosyan	Marish	Mutual friend of Vika
Anahit Kocharyan	Djulik	Old woman
Vilen Sargsyan	Alik	bartender
Edgar Sargsyan	Gugo	Enemy of Gagik
Conan O'Brien	Boss	
