= Marinka Khachatryan =

Armenian actress

Marinka Khachatryan Մարինկա Խաչատրյան
- Born: Marinka Khachatryan; Yerevan, Armenia
- Occupation: Actress
- Years active: 2014–present

Marinka Khachatryan (Armenian: Մարինկա Խաչատրյան), is an Armenian actress. She is known for her roles as Mane on Full House and Arpi on Slave of Love, in addition to Sara in Elen’s Diary 1,2 and Nenet in Alien.

== Filmography ==
Television and web
Year	Title	Role	Notes
2014-2015	Slave of love	Arpi	Main Cast (204 episodes)
2016	Full House	Mane Yeranyan	Recurring (22 episodes)
2016-2017	The Surrogate Mother	Sona	Lead role
2017-2017	Alien	Nenet	Main cast
2017-2019	Ellen's Diary	Sara	Main cast

Music Video
Year	Title	Artist
2015	Wedding day	Gevorg Martirosyan
2016	Annman (unmatched)	Arabo
