= Julia Matevosyan =

Electrical engineer

Julia Matevosyan (also published as Julija Sveca, born 1978) is an electrical engineer specializing in the integration of renewable energy sources into the electrical grid, typically involving asynchronous inverter-based connections. Born in the Soviet Union, and educated in Latvia and Sweden, she works in the US as associate director and chief engineer for the Energy Systems Integration Group.

== Education and career ==
Matevosyan was born in Riga, then part of the Soviet Union, in 1978. Her high school best friend came from a family of power engineers, and they both determined to go into the same field together. She studied electrical engineering as an undergraduate at the Riga Technical University in Latvia, with an exchange term at the KTH Royal Institute of Technology in Stockholm, Sweden. Returning to KTH for graduate study, she received a master's degree and completed her Ph.D. Her 2006 doctoral dissertation, Wind Power Integration in Power Systems with Transmission Bottlenecks, was supervised by Lennart Söder.

After her doctorate, she continued at KTH for two years of postdoctoral research, and then worked for three years as a consultant in London before moving to Austin, Texas, where she worked for ten years at the Electric Reliability Council of Texas. After joining the Energy Systems Integration Group in Texas, she became chief engineer circa 2021 and associate director in 2024.

== Recognition ==
Matevosyan was named to the 2026 class of IEEE Fellows, "for contributions in the planning and design of power systems with inverter-based resources".
