= David Matevosyan =

Armenian military and police officer, and politician (1960–2020)

- Դավիթ Մաթևոսյան

Member of parliament
- In office 1995–1999
- President: Levon Ter-Petrosyan

Personal details
- Born: David Ghevondi Matevosyan; March 22, 1960 Karchevan, Armenian SSR, Soviet Union
- Died: October 23, 2020 (aged 60) Nrnadzor, Armenia
- Citizenship: Armenia
- Party: Armenian National Congress
- Education: Armenian Agricultural Institute

Military service
- Allegiance: Armenian Armed Forces
- Branch/service: Armenian Ground Forces
- Years of service: 1991– ?
- Battles/wars: First Nagorno-Karabakh War; Second Nagorno-Karabakh War

David Ghevondi Matevosyan (Armenian: Դավիթ Ղևոնդի Մաթևոսյան; March 22, 1960 – October 22, 2020) was an Armenian soldier, police officer, and politician. A participant of the First Nagorno-Karabakh War, he was killed during the 2020 Nagorno-Karabakh war.

== Life ==
David Matevosyan was born on 22 March 1960, in the village of Karchevan (near Meghri) of the Armenian SSR. He graduated from the Armenian Agricultural Institute with a degree in hydraulic engineering, and in 1982, he started working as a foreman in the Agarak mining construction department. A year later, he started working as an engineer in the Meghri Department of the Land Reclamation and Water Supply. In 1984, he became an instructor for the Meghri District Committee of the Armenian Komsomol. From 1985 to 1991, he served as the director of the Karchevan sovkhoz. He also fought in the First Nagorno-Karabakh War. Then, he served as the head of the Department of Internal Affairs of the Meghri District until 1995. From 1995 to 1999, he served in the Armenian parliament as a member of the ruling Republican Bloc.

During the 2008 Armenian presidential election, he was a member of Levon Ter-Petrosyan's campaign team. He was arrested during the 2008 Armenian presidential election protests, charged with attacking a police officer and sentenced to three years imprisonment in June 2008. He was released in June 2009. In 2019, the European Court of Human Rights ruled in Matevosyan's favor regarding his imprisonment and ordered the Armenian government to compensate him for the violation of his rights.

== Death ==
During the 2020 Nagorno-Karabakh war, he fought on the Armenian side and was killed on October 23. Before his death, he wrote a letter to Prime Minister Nikol Pashinyan, calling on him to end the war as soon as possible:

By my information and analysis, you are losing the 'holy' 'patriotic' war. While it is not too late, personally take responsibility and immediately go for a political solution. Be assured that the people will support you and value you.

== Legacy ==
In June 2022, a collection of David Matevosyan's writings, including his memoirs, articles, and prose, was published under the title Khaghaghutʻyan havatamkʻov ("With the Creed of Peace") by Antares Publishing.
