= Anora =

2024 film by Sean Baker

- Theatrical release poster
- Directed by: Sean Baker
- Written by: Sean Baker
- Produced by: Alex Coco; Samantha Quan; Sean Baker
- Starring: Mikey Madison; Mark Eydelshteyn; Yura Borisov; Karren Karagulian; Vache Tovmasyan; Darya Ekamasova; Aleksei Serebryakov
- Cinematography: Drew Daniels
- Edited by: Sean Baker
- Production companies: FilmNation Entertainment; Cre Film
- Distributed by: Neon (United States and Canada); Focus Features (Note: Distributed through Universal Pictures; deal excludes France (Le Pacte), Australia and New Zealand (Kismet Movies), and Israel (Lev Cinemas)) (International)
- Release dates: May 21, 2024 (Cannes); October 18, 2024 (United States)
- Running time: 139 minutes
- Country: United States
- Languages: English; Russian; Armenian
- Budget: $6 million
- Box office: $59.3 million

Anora is a 2024 American romantic comedy drama film written, directed, produced, and edited by Sean Baker. It stars Mikey Madison as Anora "Ani" Mikheeva, a lap dancer from New York who marries the wealthy son of a Russian oligarch played by Mark Eydelshteyn. The supporting cast includes Yura Borisov, Karren Karagulian, Vache Tovmasyan, Darya Ekamasova, and Aleksei Serebryakov.

Anora premiered at the 77th Cannes Film Festival on May 21, 2024, where it received critical acclaim and won the Palme d'Or. It was released theatrically on October 18, 2024, by Neon, with Focus Features releasing in other territories. It grossed $59.3 million worldwide against a $6 million budget, making it Baker's highest-grossing film.

Anora received numerous accolades and was named one of the top ten films of 2024 by the National Board of Review and the American Film Institute. It received six nominations at the 97th Academy Awards, winning five for Best Picture, Best Director, Best Actress (Madison), Best Original Screenplay, and Best Film Editing. It is one of only four films to win both the Palme d'Or and the Academy Award for Best Picture. (Note: The previous three films to win both awards were The Lost Weekend (1945), Marty (1955), and Parasite (2019).) Anora won for International Movie at the 70th David di Donatello awards, and received seven nominations at the 78th British Academy Film Awards, winning two; five at the 82nd Golden Globe Awards; and three at the 31st Screen Actors Guild Awards.

== Plot ==
Anora "Ani" Mikheeva, a 23-year-old stripper and prostitute, lives in Brighton Beach, a Russian-American neighborhood in Brooklyn, New York. Her boss introduces her to Ivan "Vanya" Zakharov, the 21-year-old son of the Russian oligarch Nikolai Zakharov, who has requested a dancer fluent in Russian. Though Vanya is in the U.S. to study, he spends most of his time partying in clubs, getting drunk and stoned and playing video games in his parents' lavish Brooklyn mansion.

Vanya hires Ani for several sexual encounters. He invites her to a New Year's Eve party at the mansion, and the following day, he offers her $15,000 to be his girlfriend for a week. During the week, Ani parties with Vanya and his friends, and they all go on an extravagant trip to Las Vegas. At the end of the trip, Vanya reveals that he has to return to Russia permanently to work at his father's company and expresses disdain for his parents. He suggests that he will not have to leave if he marries an American and impulsively proposes marriage. Ani is reluctant at first but agrees after Vanya assures her that his feelings are genuine. They elope at a Vegas wedding chapel. Vanya then buys her a large wedding ring and an expensive fur coat. She resigns from her job and moves into Vanya's mansion. When news of their marriage reaches Russia, Vanya's mother, Galina, orders his Armenian godfather, Toros, to find them and arrange an annulment while she and his father, Nikolai, fly to the U.S.

Toros sends his henchmen, Garnik and Igor, to the mansion. They inform Vanya that his parents are taking him back to Russia and enrage Ani by calling her a prostitute, suggesting Vanya only married her for a green card. Vanya flees the premises, and Ani engages in a violent struggle with Garnik and Igor before they restrain her. When Toros arrives, he tells Ani that Vanya's mansion and wealth belong to his parents and that he is immature and financially dependent on them. He confiscates her wedding ring, gags her after she starts screaming, and offers her $10,000 for the annulment. Ani insists she and Vanya are in love, but she agrees to help find him.

Over the next 12 hours, Ani, Toros, Garnik, and Igor search Brooklyn. Ani eventually learns from friends that Vanya is at her former strip club, where he is being entertained by Diamond, a rival dancer. They drag Vanya out of the club, but he is too intoxicated to listen to them, and the group is forced to wait outside the courthouse overnight. The annulment is dismissed since the marriage took place in Nevada.

At the airport, Ani introduces herself to Nikolai and Galina in broken Russian, but Galina rejects her. Conceding to his parents, Vanya coldly tells Ani their marriage must end while Galina orders everyone onto a plane to Las Vegas. Having not signed a prenuptial agreement, Ani pledges to file for a divorce settlement, but Galina threatens her and her family with financial ruin if she does not comply. Realizing Vanya's cowardice and his family's power, Ani signs the annulment papers. Igor suggests Vanya apologize to Ani, but Galina objects. Ani insults both Vanya and Galina before leaving, telling Galina that Vanya hates her and only got married to spite her.

Igor takes Ani back to New York to collect her belongings. At the mansion, she confronts Igor about their encounter the previous day, accusing him of assault and saying he would have raped her had they been alone, though Igor assures her that he had no intention of doing so. The next morning, Igor gives Ani the money Toros promised her and drives her home. In the car, he returns her wedding ring as a token of goodwill. Ani initiates sex with him but stops when he tries to kiss her; she breaks down and sobs in his arms.

== Cast ==
- Mikey Madison as Anora "Ani" Mikheeva, a high-priced stripper at the Headquarters strip club
- Mark Eydelshteyn (alternatively anglicized to "Eidelstein") as Ivan "Vanya" Zakharov, the wealthy son of a Russian oligarch
- Yura Borisov as Igor, a Russian henchman hired by Toros to look after Vanya
- Karren Karagulian as Toros, Vanya's Armenian godfather who is employed by Vanya's father to look after him
- Vache Tovmasyan as Garnik, an Armenian henchman who works for Toros
- Aleksei Serebryakov as Nikolai Zakharov, Vanya's father
- Darya Ekamasova as Galina Zakharova, Vanya's mother
- Luna Sofía Miranda as Lulu, another Headquarters stripper and a friend of Ani's
- Lindsey Normington as Diamond, an unfriendly Headquarters stripper who competes with Ani for clients
- Vincent Radwinsky as Jimmy, an owner at the Headquarters strip club
- Anton Bitter as Tom, Vanya's friend who works at a Coney Island candy shop
- Ivy Wolk as Crystal, Vanya's friend who works at a Coney Island candy shop
- Vlad Mamai as Aleks, Vanya's friend
- Maria Tichinskaya as Dasha, Vanya's friend
- Charles Jang as Vegas Hotel Manager
- Emily Weider as Nikki, a stripper
- Brittney Rodriguez as Dawn, a manager at Headquarters
- Sophia Carnabuci as Jenny, a stripper
- Ella Rubin as Vera, Ani's sister and roommate
- Alena Gurevich as Klara, a housekeeper for the Zakharova mansion
- Artyom Trubnikov as Michael Sharnov, a lawyer
- Michael Sergio as a judge
- Sebastian Conelli as Tow Truck Driver

== Production ==
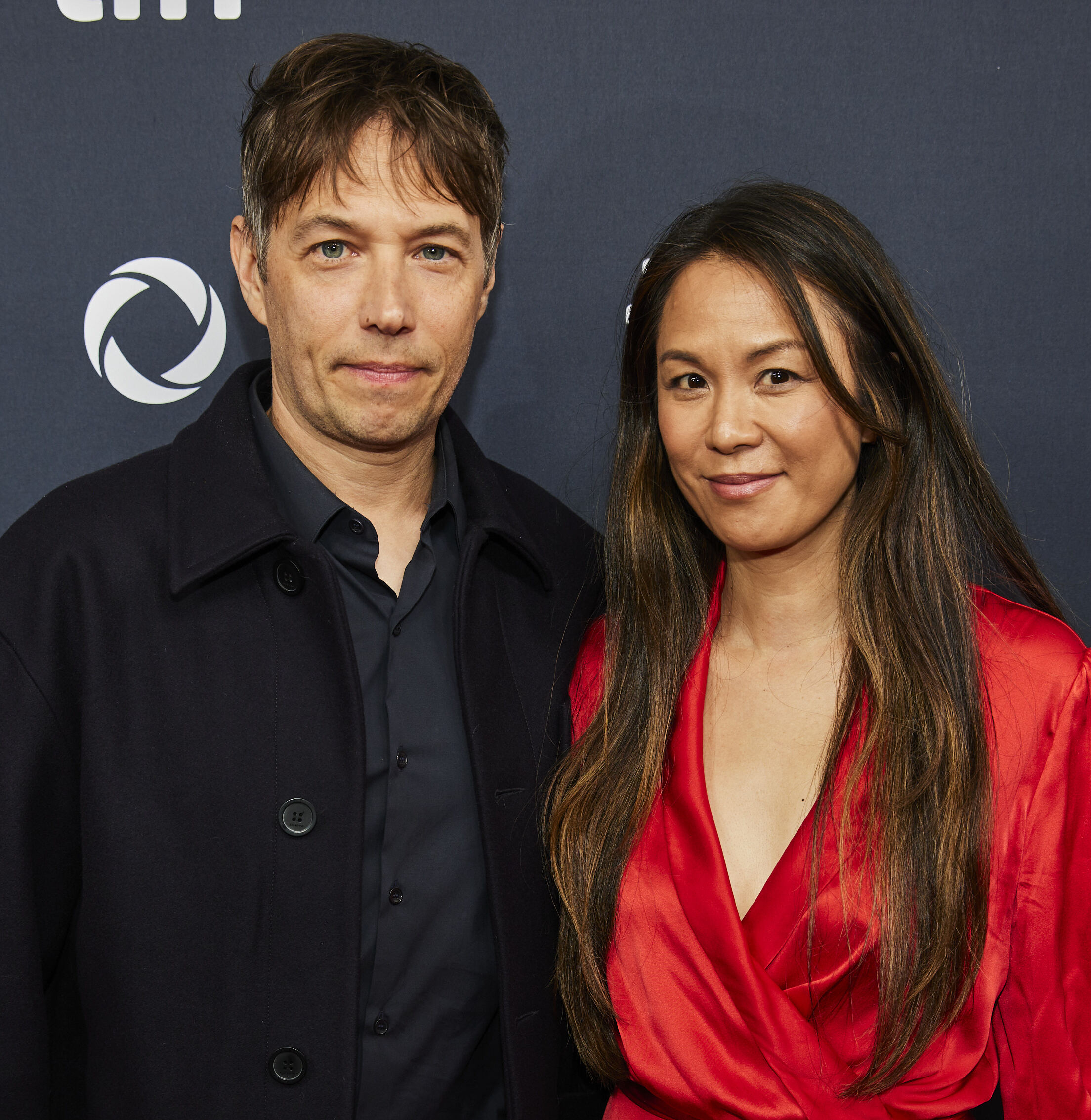
Director Sean Baker with his wife and co-producer Samantha Quan

The director, Sean Baker, said Anora was inspired by a story from a friend about a Russian-American newlywed kidnapped for collateral. He was also inspired by his work in 2000 and 2001, when he edited wedding videos, including ones of Russian-Americans in New York. Baker said his intentions were towards "telling human stories, by telling stories that are hopefully universal [...] It's helping remove the stigma that's been applied to [sex work], that's always been applied to this livelihood." Baker hired Andrea Werhun, a Canadian writer and actress known for her 2018 memoir Modern Whore about her prior time as a sex worker, as a creative consultant.

Baker cast Mikey Madison after seeing her in Once Upon a Time in Hollywood (2019) and Scream (2022). He hired Madison without an audition. Madison learned Russian, visited strip clubs, and studied the Brooklyn accent to prepare. Although some media outlets incorrectly reported that Anora Mikheeva was Uzbek-American, Baker said that Anora "is of Russian ethnicity" and "from one of the post-Soviet countries".

Principal photography took place starting in February 2023 in Brooklyn, including the neighborhoods of Brighton Beach, Coney Island, and Sheepshead Bay. Scenes set at Headquarters, Ani's workplace, were shot at both Rosewood Theater and HQ KONY, a pair of connected gentlemen's clubs located near Hudson Yards in Manhattan. Anora was filmed over 37 days, with the 25-minute home invasion scene taking 10 days. It was shot on Kodak 35 mm film framed in 4-perf widescreen anamorphic using an Arricam LT, with color correction completed via DaVinci Resolve at FotoKem. The "abduction" scene in the penthouse was filmed over five days with wide shots done first and close-ups done sometimes into the night; Gaffer Chris Hill explained that to match the daytime lighting of the wide shots, he used an 18K that they'd bounce in, a Prolycht 675, and a Celeb 850 with a snap grid and couch stuffing attached to the grid. Vintage LOMO prime and zoom lenses were mainly used for filming, while Atlas Orion lenses were used for low-light scenes. Scenes were also shot at the Palms Casino Resort and on Fremont Street in Las Vegas. The film's cinematography was inspired by 1970s crime dramas set in New York, including The French Connection and The Taking of Pelham One Two Three. Alex Coco, one of the producers, worked as a disc jockey for the music in the scenes in the club. Baker is credited with the casting, with the cast including more than 30 different speaking parts.

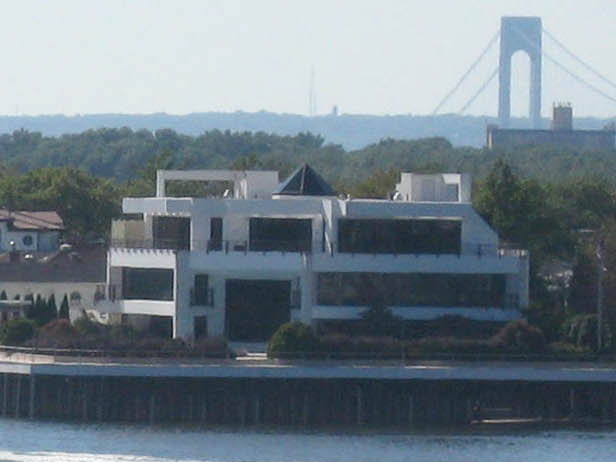
Mill Basin home used as the Zakharov mansion

For the Zakharov mansion, Baker filmed at 2458 National Drive, a Mill Basin mansion once owned by Vasily Anisimov, an oligarch with ties to Russia. Baker had searched on Google for "the biggest and best mansion in Brighton Beach". To learn more about the area, Baker and Mikey Madison temporarily moved to southern Brooklyn during pre-production. Toros' and Ani's search for Vanya was filmed in several restaurants and clubs that the producers had frequented.

At a press conference at the Cannes Film Festival, Madison said that Baker and the producer Samantha Quan, Baker's wife, would act out different sex positions to demonstrate what they wanted the actors to do. Madison was offered an intimacy coordinator, but said: "As I'd already created a really comfortable relationship with both of them for about a year, I felt that that would be where I was most comfortable with and it ended up working so perfectly."

The soundtrack includes Robin Schulz rework of "Greatest Day" by Take That and "All the Things She Said" by t.A.T.u. Madison also said that her friend curated a "stripper playlist" for her to get into character, including tracks from Cardi B, Megan Thee Stallion, Iggy Azalea and Slayyyter. As with his previous films, Baker edited Anora in Adobe Premiere Pro. Speaking with Josh Safdie, Baker admitted to editing Anora while high. The film includes a "special thanks" credit to Spanish exploitation filmmaker Jesús Franco and actress Soledad Miranda due to their film Vampyros Lesbos (1970) inspiring the red scarf prominently worn by Ani.

== Release ==
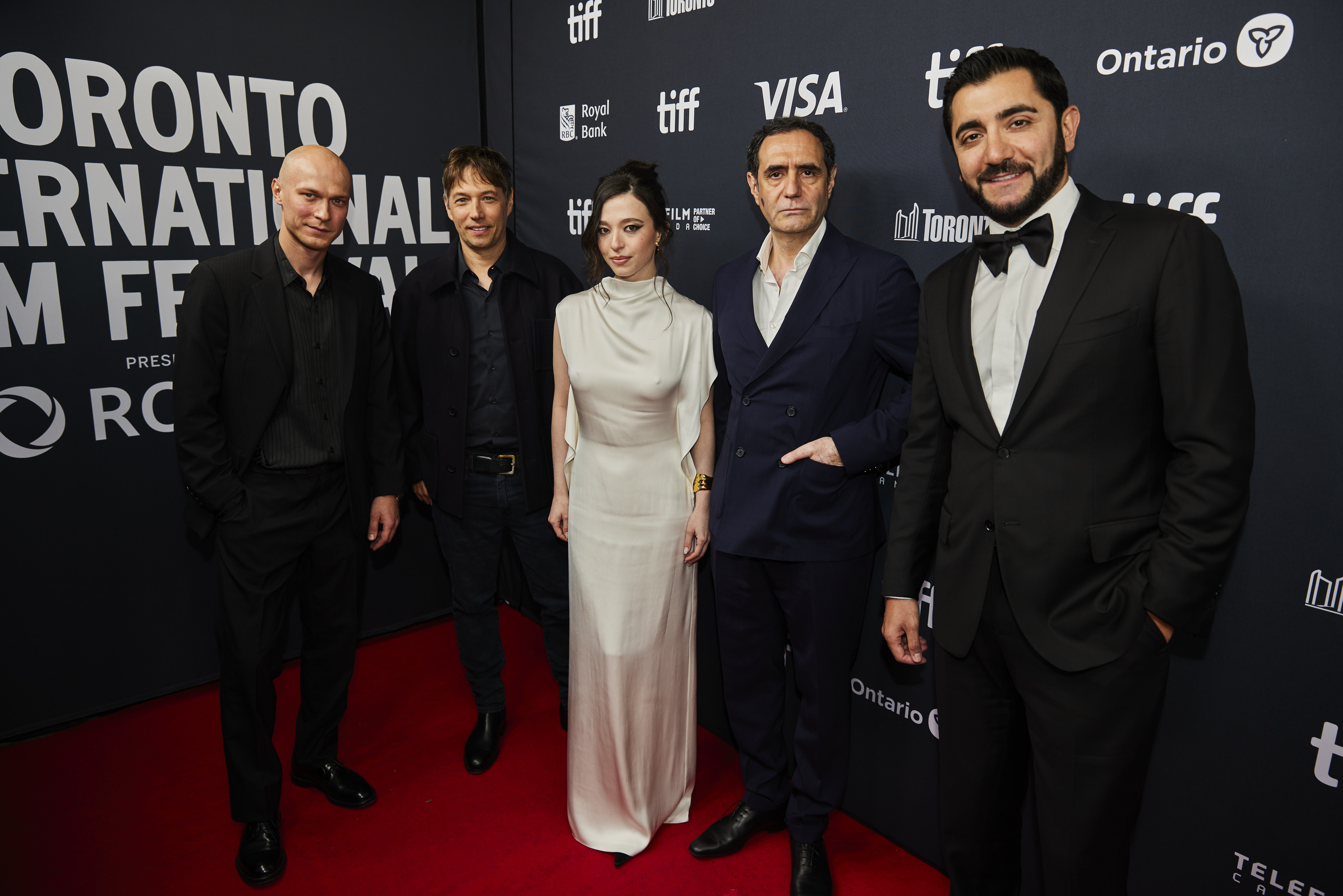
Yura Borisov, Sean Baker, Mikey Madison, Karren Karagulian, and Vache Tovmasyan at the 2024 Toronto International Film Festival

Worldwide distribution rights were acquired by FilmNation Entertainment in October 2023. The film was then sold by FilmNation to Le Pacte for France, Lev Cinemas for Israel, Kismet Movies for Australia and New Zealand, and Focus Features/Universal Pictures International for the rest of the world excluding North America in deals similar to those made on Baker's previous film, Red Rocket. In November 2023, Neon acquired North American distribution rights, and opened it in limited release on October 18, 2024.

Anora premiered at the Cannes Film Festival on May 21, 2024, and won the festival's Palme d'Or on May 25. It earned a 10-minute standing ovation at the end of its screening. It became the fifth consecutive Palme d'Or winner distributed by Neon in the United States, and the first American-produced film to win the Palme d'Or since Terrence Malick's 2011 epic The Tree of Life.

Anora also played at the Toronto International Film Festival, the New York Film Festival, the San Sebastián International Film Festival, the Busan International Film Festival, the BFI London Film Festival, the Rome Film Festival and several others. It was also the closing film at the MAMI Mumbai Film Festival 2024. The film was released on digital platforms on December 17, 2024, with a streaming release on Hulu on March 17, 2025. It was released on 4K Ultra HD Blu-ray by The Criterion Collection on April 29.

According to Tom Quinn, CEO of Neon, the P&A and the awards season publicity campaign budget was $18 million.

=== Home media ===
Anora was released on home media as part of The Criterion Collection on April 29, 2025, on standard Blu-ray and 4K Ultra HD Blu-ray formats, based on a new 4K master overseen by director Sean Baker. This release also includes two audio commentary tracks, one with Baker, producers Alex Coco and Samantha Quan, and cinematographer Drew Daniels, and another one with Baker and actors Yura Borisov, Mark Eydelshteyn, Karren Karagulian, Mikey Madison, and Vache Tovmasyan, as well as a making-of documentary, interviews with Baker and Madison, a recording of the press conference at the Cannes Film Festival, deleted scenes, audition footage, trailers, and essays written by writer Dennis Lim and author Kier-La Janisse.

== Reception ==
=== Box office ===
Anora grossed $20.5 million in the United States and Canada, and $38.8 million in other territories, for a worldwide total of $59.3 million. In the United States, it made $550,503 in its opening weekend from six theaters; its per-screen-average of $91,751 was the best of 2024 (topping Kinds of Kindness' $75,458 average), and the second-best since the start of the COVID-19 pandemic (after Asteroid City's $142,230). Expanding to 34 theaters in its second weekend, Anora made $908,830 and finished in eighth place. It made $1.8 million from 253 theaters and $2.5 million from 1,104 in its third and fourth weekends. In its 21st week of release in March, following its five Oscar wins, Anora was added to 1,130 theaters (for a total of 1,938) and made $1.8 million (an increase of 574% from the previous week), finishing seventh.

=== Critical response ===
On the review aggregator website Rotten Tomatoes, 93% of 356 critics' reviews are positive, with an average rating of 8.5/10. The website's consensus reads: "Another marvelous chronicle of America's strivers by writer-director Sean Baker given some extra pizzazz by Mikey Madison's brassy performance, Anora is a romantic drama on the bleeding edge." Metacritic, which uses a weighted average, assigned the film a score of 91 out of 100, based on 62 critics, indicating "universal acclaim". On AlloCiné, the film received an average rating of 4.2 out of 5, based on 45 reviews, from French critics.

Greta Gerwig, serving as the president of the 77th Cannes Film Festival Jury, commented that "[Anora] was something we collectively felt we were transported by, we were moved by [...] It felt both new and in conversation with older forms of cinema. There was something about it that reminded us of [the] classic structures of Lubitsch or Howard Hawks, and then it did something completely truthful and unexpected."

Richard Lawson of Vanity Fair thought Anora was "a wild, profane blast." He liked Madison's "lively" performance, yet described the storytelling as somewhat repetitive. Lawson wrote "a darkness thrums under the surface of all this flirting and bickering. Ani is forever yanked this way and that, degraded and disregarded [...] I [was] torn between finding Baker's conclusions compassionate and sensing a vague whiff of something patronizing." Roger Moore of Movie Nation thought it had "gauche, bourgeois clichés". While he praised Madison, he thought Baker's editing dulled "his predictable narrative and message." Stephen Dalton of The Film Verdict disliked how "an overlong runtime, underwritten characters and some uneasy tonal wobbles dampen the film's punchy humour and propulsive energy". He wrote of one scene as "an extended struggle that lurches uneasily between slapstick comedy and brutalising assault." Dalton thought the narrative was "oddly paced", describing the "lyrical final section" as lacking "conviction or firm resolution." Justin Chang of The New Yorker wrote that Anora "plays like a wild dream—first joyous, then catastrophic, and always fiercely unpredictable." He enjoyed the "contemporary return to screwball tradition", yet thought it could have been employed better. Chang liked how it "built up a righteous steam of fury, now unleashes it against the Ivans of the world and salutes those toiling thanklessly in their employ."

Sight and Sound named Anora the second-best film of 2024, and Film Comment named it one of the ten best. In 2025, Collider named Anora the 36th-best movie of the 2020s, with Jeremy Urquhart calling it "something of a modern classic". Anora was praised by many filmmakers and actors. In March 2025, IndieWire named it the 46th-best romance film of the century, with Wilson Chapman calling it "exactly the type of love affair only he [Baker] could write: funny, lewd, sexy, tempered by class and financial considerations, and ultimately quite tragic and brutally real." IndieWire also ranked it the 34th-best film of the decade so far in June 2025. Readers of The New York Times voted it the 14th-best film of the 21st century.

The Russian-Jewish screenwriter Mikhail Idov, found it difficult to reconcile support for Anora, given the ongoing Russian invasion of Ukraine; he commented in the New York Times on February 27, 2025, "Its Oscar nominations, especially the best supporting actor one for Yura Borisov, have been touted by some as a national victory in Russia. Which puts me in the unsettling position of being in some truly terrible company in cheering for it."

==== Reaction from sex workers ====
Anora received praise from some sex workers for its depiction of the profession, which they described as a step forward from films of the past that tended to portray sex work as a social transgression worthy of condemnation. In a piece for Slate, Risdon Roberts contrasted the character of Ani with Vivian Ward in Pretty Woman, writing the former "is not a desperate or trafficked waif, nor is she a hooker with a heart of gold. Baker doesn't even set out to make [Ani] worthy of sympathy—instead, we're in awe of her prowess as she works the floor of a high-end strip club while the opening credits play ... Right away, it's clear that we're rooting for Ani not because she's down and out like Vivian—we're rooting for her because she's shrewd and in control".

Tiff Smith said, "We're seeing a fully developed character doing sex work without their profession defining them—that's what representation really is." Some said Baker's hiring of sex workers for the production as consultants and cast members was reflected in the film's attention to detail like the mundane realities of strip club life and labor issues.

Others felt that Anora reverted to regressive stereotypes about sex workers as downtrodden and "in need of saving". A UK-based sex worker said it "rehashes the 'traumatised, vulnerable sex worker' trope, which we've seen a thousand times before". Marla Cruz opined that little is revealed about Ani's life outside of sex work, and that an exploration of the "boundary between Ani the person and Ani the worker" is absent. Ayanna Dozier wrote "the film narratively builds upon and follows the social imaginaries of sex workers as subhuman projections for other people's fantasies". Cruz wrote that it is debatable "whether Ani becomes more clear-eyed about her relationship to power, men, and money throughout the film". Though Roberts appreciated Anora generally, she critiqued the ending, writing that for real-life sex workers, the true goal is not to be saved by a man, but "is about survival (or, ideally, transcending the need to survive)". She added that rather than representing the knights in shining armor archetype, "Clients are a means to an end. Money can't break your heart."

==== Reception in Russia ====
The film has apparently had a mixed response in Russia, with some critics comparing it to a re-hashing of Pretty Woman. Anora has also been portrayed as a "national victory" and a sign of warming cultural relations between Russia and the West.

== Accolades ==
Anora won the Palme d'Or at the 77th Cannes Film Festival. It was nominated for five awards at the 82nd Golden Globe Awards, seven at the 78th British Academy Film Awards (winning Best Actress and Best Casting) and six at the 97th Academy Awards with Baker, Madison, and Borisov receiving nominations at each ceremony. The film won five Academy Awards, including Best Picture, becoming the fourth film (after The Lost Weekend, Marty, and Parasite) to win both it and the highest award at Cannes. Baker equalled the record set by Walt Disney for the most Academy Awards won by a person in one year and is the only person to win all four for the same film.

The American Film Institute and the National Board of Review named Anora as one of the top 10 films of 2024. At the 30th Critics' Choice Awards, it became the first film to only win Critics' Choice Movie Award for Best Picture and none of its other six nominations.

== See also ==
- Social realism
- List of American films of 2024
- List of American independent films
- List of films that most frequently use the word fuck
- List of Academy Award–winning films
- 77th Cannes Film Festival
- List of Neon films
