= Tandem (TV series) =

- Տանդեմ
- Genre: Sitcom
- Directed by: Arman Nshanyan
- Starring: Sofya Poghosyan; Feliks Khachatryan; Hovhannes Azoyan
- Country of origin: Armenia
- Original languages: Armenian; English

Production
- Production locations: Yerevan, Armenia

Original release
- Network: AMPTV
- Release: March 5 – May 17, 2018

Tandem (Armenian: Տանդեմ) is an Armenian sitcom television series developed by Arman Nshanyan. The series premiered on Armenia 1 on 5 March 2018. The shooting of the sitcom started on 23 December 2017.

The series takes place in Yerevan.
