= 3/OFF =

- Also known as: Three/OFF
- Երեք/ՕՖՖ
- Genre: Game show
- Written by: Artyom Hakobyan
- Directed by: Levon Bartikyan
- Creative director: Edgar Vardanyan Aram Stephanyan
- Presented by: Artyom Hakobyan
- Country of origin: Armenia
- Original language: Armenian
- No. of seasons: 3
- No. of episodes: 39

Production
- Producer: Artyom Hakobyan
- Cinematography: Ashot Avetisyan; Narek Maronyan; Sergey Ghazaryan; Serob Manukyan; Levon Margaryan; Ashot Hovhannisyan; Mikayel Khachaturyan
- Editors: Hovhannes Yephremyan; Arsen Aslanyan; Karen Khocharyan
- Running time: 39-42 minutes
- Production company: PanArmenian

Original release
- Network: Armenia TV
- Release: April 7, 2017 – June 8, 2018

3/OFF was an Armenian television program hosted by Armenian presenter-producer Artyom Hakobyan. It ran for three seasons with the first season premiering on Armenia TV on April 7, 2017 and the third one on March 16, 2018.

The show was an intellectual game show where two teams (of three contestants each) compete against each other.
