= Secret Love (Armenian TV series) =

- Genre: Romance melodrama
- Based on: Tierra de reyes
- Country of origin: Armenia
- Original language: Armenian
- No. of seasons: 1
- No. of episodes: 180

Production
- Production locations: Yerevan, Armenia
- Running time: 40-42 minutes

Original release
- Network: Shant TV
- Release: April 25 – August 31, 2016

Secret Love (Armenian: Թաքնված սեր Taknvats Ser) is an Armenian romantic melodrama television series, based on Spanish-language telenovela Tierra de reyes. The series premiered on Shant TV on April 25, 2016, and is composed of one-hundred-eighty episodes. Most of the series took place in Yerevan, Armenia.

== Cast and characters ==
=== Main cast ===
- Ashot Ter-Matevosyan portrays David Karapetyan
- Gayane Balyan portrays Anna Danielyan
- Gnel Ulikhanyan portrays Sos Karapetyan
- Mariam Adamyan portrays Saten Danielyan
- David Aghajanyan portrays Levon Karapetyan
- Sofya Poghosyan portrays Mane Danielyan
- Murad Nadiryan portrays Vahe Khachatryan
- Nelli Kheranyan portrays Elena Danielyan
- Davit Hakobyan portrays Arshak
- Inna Khojamiryan portrays Liza Karapetyan / Ani
- Milena Vardanyan portrays Nika
- Lusine Hovakimyan portrays Manan
- Tatev Mirzoyan portrays Syuzan
- Suren Tumasyan portrays Atom Badalyan
- Olya Hakobyan portrays Karine Margaryan
- Samvel Asatryan portrays Artak Margaryan

=== Recurring cast ===
- Armen Margaryan portrays Hrant Danielyan
- Ashot Hkaobyan portrays Voskanyan
- Asya Hovsepyan portrays Liusi
- Liza Barseghyan portrays Maro
- Hayk Hovhannisyan portrays Feliks
- Karen Galstyan portrays Gor Karakhanyan
- unknown portrays Sako
- unknown portrays Armen
- Arm Grigoryan portrays Sevak
- Hrach Mlrakyan portrays Aram
- Nane Gasparyan portrays Ruzan
