= Hovak Galoyan =

Armenian actor (born 1973)

Hovak Galoyan / Հովակ Գալոյան
- Born: Hovak Davit Galoyan / Հովակ Դավթի Գալոյան; September 17, 1973 (age 51); Yerevan, Armenian SSR, Soviet Union
- Occupation: Actor
- Years active: 1992–present

Hovak Davti Galoyan (Armenian: Հովակ Դավթի Գալոյան; born August 1, 1963), is an Armenian actor. In 2014, Galoyan was awarded with the title of Honored Artist of Armenia upon the decree of Armenian president Serzh Sargsyan.
