= Shant TV =

Armenian television channel

- Country: Armenia
- Headquarters: Yerevan (formerly Gyumri)

Programming
- Picture format: 576i SDTV; 1080p HDTV

Ownership
- Owner: Arthur Yezekyan, Armen Minas

History
- Launched: 1994
- Former names: STV Armenia

Links
- Website: www.shanttv.com

Availability

Terrestrial
- DVB-T: Channel 3

Shant TV (Armenian: Շանթ հեռուստատեսություն, romanized: Shant' herrustatesut'yun) is a private television broadcasting company in Armenia. Shant TV was founded by Arthur Yezekyan in Gyumri, the second largest city in Armenia, in 1994. Shant TV launched a full 6 hour broadcasting schedule in May 1995.

== History ==
The station was founded at a time of hunger for information programs and social tension in the country. This is the main reason why the newly founded TV company began specializing in producing news and information programs from its beginning. In 2001, Shant TV moved to Yerevan, the capital of Armenia, and gained popularity and trust over the next three years. It started regular broadcasting, also in 2001.

== Programming ==
The most popular shows on Shant TV include:

- The Surrogate Mother
- Slave of Love
- In The Army
- In The City
- Overview of Abroad
- Alien
- Ellen's Diary
- Armenians of the World
- Secret Love
- Vitamin Club

== Time-line ==
- 1994 - Founded in Gyumri
- 1995 - Shant TV has launched its full 6 hour broadcasting with every day Armenian TV programs system
- 1995 - Shant TV has launched a private weekly newspaper
- 1995/1996 - Temporary coding of the ether in terms of energy crisis
- 1997 - Start of production of humor and joke sketches and its realization among Armenians all over the world
- 1998 - Foundation of private radio station
- 2001 - Moved to Yerevan, where it started regular broadcasting
- 2003 - Shant TV acquired the right of broadcasting the Armenian version of the famous television show Who Wants to Be a Millionaire?. This television game was the first internationally acknowledged format in Armenia, acquired legally.
- 2003 - Shant TV company went online and started online broadcasting
- 2003 - "Car Parade" program began to be broadcast
- 2006 - Shant started TV serials
- 2006-2011 - Shant TV broadcasts competition TV shows: Hay Superstar (Idols franchise), My name is..., X-Factor, Dance Show, Hidden Talent, So You Think You Can Dance?
- 2011 - "Armenians of the World" began to be broadcast
- 2016 - Shant showed the romantic drama Vendetta

== Web presence ==
Shant TV also launched an online video platform focusing on international and national news called Shant News.

== See also ==
- Television in Armenia
