= Armenia in the New Wave competition =

Armenia
- Participating broadcaster: Public Television of Armenia (AMPTV)

Participation summary
- Appearances: 16 (17 participants)
- First appearance: 2003
- Highest placement: 1st: 2010, 2017, 2021, 2024

External links
- newwavestars.eu

Armenia has participated in the New Wave International Contest 16 times, making its first appearance in 2003, where the Armenian singer Emmy finished fourteenth.

Armenia has won the contest four times: in 2010, 2017, 2021 and 2024. The country's four wins were achieved by Sona Shahgeldyan (2010), Erna Mir (2017), Saro Gevorgyan (2021), and Anahit Hakobyan (2024). Armenia also finished in the top five several times during their participation in the contest, with Syuzanna Melqonyan and Gevorg Harutyunyan finishing second in 2017 and 2018, and Mger and Erik finishing fifth in 2008 and 2011 respectively.

== Contestants ==
Table key
1	Winner
2	Second place

Year	Artist	First day	Second day	Third day	Final	Points
2003	Emmy				14	191
2004	"Hayer" band				8-9	179
2005	Arman Grigoryan				15	197
2006	Razmik Amyan				10	279
2007	Did not participate				–	–
2008	Mger	"We Are the Champions"	"Հայաստան" (Hayastan)	"Кто" (Kto)	5	341
2009	Did not participate				–	–
2010	Sona Shahgeldyan	"Baby Come to Me"	"Հայաստան աշխարh" (Hayastan Ashkharh)	"Կորուստ թե գանձ" (Korust te gandz)	1	288
2011	Erik	"All in Love Is Fair"	"Твои следы" (Tvoi sledi)	"Լինեմ քամի" (Linem qami)	5-6	335
2012	Suren Arustamyan	"Change the World"	"Моя любовь тебе" (Moya lyubov tebe)	"Next to you"	8-9	180
2013	Meri Mnjoyan	"All by Myself"	"Твои следы" (Tvoi sledi)	"Я и только ты" (Ya i tolko ti)	8	344
2014	Sona Rubenyan	"Wrecking Ball"	"Հայաստան" (Hayastan)	"Կարոտ" (Karot)	6	220
2015	Grigor Kyokchyan	"Sunny"	"Две звезды" (Dve zvezdy)	"Afro"	7	265
2016	Did not participate				–	–
2017	Erna Mir	"24K Magic"	"Армения Моя" (Armenia Moya)	"In Love"	1	363
2017	Syuzanna Melqonyan	"Stand Up for Love"	"Твои следы" (Tvoi sledi)	"Навсегда" (Navsegda)	2	357
2018	Gevorg Harutyunyan	"Lost on You"	"Կյանք ու կռիվ" (Kyanq U Kriv)	"Stand Up"	2	297
2019	TYOM	"Так же, как все" (Tak zhe, kak vse)	"Let Me Feel You"		9	230
2021	Saro Gevorgyan	"Listen"	"Կուզես" (Kuzes)	"Биполярная любовь" (Bipolyarnaya lyubov')	1	267
2024	Anahit Hakobyan	"Jan Jan"	"The Armenian's Sky" (Հայի երկինքը)	"My Way"	1	222

== Awards ==
Year	Artist	Award
2008	Mger	Audience Choice
2011	Erik	Audience Choice
2014	Sona Rubenyan	Audience Choice
2015	Grigor Kyokchyan	Special prize from www.woman.ru

== See also ==
- Armenia in the Eurovision Song Contest
- Armenia in the Junior Eurovision Song Contest
