= Fallin' (Demy song) =

Single by Playmen featuring Demy

from the album #1
- Released: 11 January 2012
- Recorded: 2011
- Length: 4:00
- Label: Panik
- Songwriter(s): Playmen; New Tone; Stan
- Producer(s): Playmen; Alex Leon

Demy singles chronology
"Mono Mprosta" (2011)	"Fallin'" (2012)	"Poses Xiliades Kalokairia" (2012)

"Fallin'" is a song by Greek musical duo Playmen featuring Greek singer Demy. It was released as a digital download in Greece on 11 January 2012 as the third single from her debut studio album #1 (2012). The song also peaked at number 1 on the Greek Singles Chart.

== Music video ==
A music video to accompany the release of "Fallin'" was first released onto YouTube on 12 February 2012 at a total length of four minutes and twenty-three seconds.

== Track listing ==
Digital download
No.	Title	Length
1.	"Fallin'"	4:00

== Charts ==
Chart (2012)	Peak position
Bulgaria (Airplay Chart)	12
Greece (IFPI)	1

== Release history ==
Region	Date	Format	Label
Greece	11 January 2012	Digital download	Panik Records
