= 1 (Demy album) =

#1

Studio album by Demy
- Released: 19 December 2012
- Recorded: 2011–12
- Genre: Pop; dance-pop
- Length: 35:59
- Label: Panik Records
- Producer: Alex Leon; Dimitris Kontopoulos; OGE; LemonPlay; Ginno; Playmen

Demy chronology
Poses Hiliades Kalokairia (2012)	#1 (2012)	Rodino Oneiro (2014)

Singles from #1
- 1. "Mia Zografia" Released: 11 July 2011; 2. "Mono Brosta" Released: November 15, 2011; 3. "Fallin'" Released: 11 January 2012; 4. "Poses Hiliades Kalokairia" Released: 6 July 2012; 5. "I Zoi (To Pio Omorfo Tragoudi)" Released: 29 October 2012; 6. "Ki An Prospatho" Released: February 2013; 7. "Meno" Released: September 2013

#1 is the first studio album by Greek singer Demy, released in Greece and Cyprus on 19 December 2012 by Panik Records. The album includes all five singles that were put out prior to its release, including the hit "Mia Zografia", "Mono Brosta" and "Poses Hiliades Kalokairia", as well as the promotional/radio single "Kratise Me" featuring OGE. The album also included three previously unheard songs, "Ta Matia Sou", "Ki An Prospatho" and "Meno", with the latter two ending up being released as singles later on. The album track list finishes with the English version of "Poses Hiliades Kalokaria", titled "Love Light". Nearly six months after its release, on June 15, 2013, the album was certified platinum selling 12,000 copies in Greece.

== Singles ==
- "Mia Zografia" was released in July 2011, by the rapper Midenistis. It is the first song Demy made an appearance on.
- "Mono Brosta" was released in November 2011, as Demy's first single with her being the lead artist, and features rapper OGE. There are two versions, with the original version (released in early 2011) performed by T.N.S featuring Demy and OGE.
- "Fallin'" was released in January 2012, by the dance duo Playmen, and features Demy's vocals.
- "Kratise Me" was released in April 2012, as a promotional single and features rapper T.N.S. The song has two versions: a 2011 demo that remains unreleased and the final 2012 version that is on the album.
- "Poses Hiliades Kalokairia" was released in July 2012. This is Demy's first entirely solo song. An English version was also released, titled "Love Light".
- "I Zoi (To Pio Omorfo Tragoudi)" was released in October 2012, as the album's fifth official single.
- "Ki An Prospatho" was released in February 2013.
- "Meno" was released in September 2013 and is the album's seventh and last single. There was also an English version of the song released, titled "Stay Here", as part of a digital EP including the official version, and a couple remixes.

== Track listing ==
No.	Title	Writer(s)	Producer(s)	Length
1.	"I Zoi (To Pio Omorfo Tragoudi)"	Romy Papadea	Alex Leon	4:07
2.	"Poses Hiliades Kalokairia"	Nikos Moraitis	Dimitris Kontopoulos	3:22
3.	"Meno"	Nikos Moraitis	Dimitris Kontopoulos	3:10
4.	"Mono Brosta" (with OGE)	OGE; Romy Papadea	OGE	3:23
5.	"Ki An Prospatho"	Giannis Rentoumis	Dimitris Kontopoulos	3:21
6.	"Mia Zografia" (with Midenistis)	Midenistis	LemonPlay	3:57
7.	"Ta Matia Sou"	Ginno	Diveno	3:29
8.	"Kratise Me" (with TNS)	OGE; TNS	OGE	3:36
9.	"Fallin'" (with Playmen)	Playmen; New Tone; Stan	Playmen; Alex Leon	4:00
10.	"Love Light"	Gerard James Borg	Dimitris Kontopoulos	3:34
Total length:				35:59

== Charts ==
Chart (2012–13)	Peak position
Greece (IFPI)	1

== Release history ==
Region	Date	Format	Label
Greece	19 December 2012	CD, digital download	Panik Records
Cyprus	19 December 2012	CD, digital download	Panik Records
