= Name that Tune (Armenian game show) =

Name that Tune or Guess the tune (Armenian: Գուշակիր մեղեդին) is an Armenian entertainment television program, developed by Avet Barseghyan, who also presents it. The series premiered on Armenia 1 on September 8, 2015. Celebrity contestants on the program have included Hovhannes Davtyan, Arsen Grigoryan, Aram MP3, Sona Shahgeldyan, Mher Khachatryan, Gor Hakobyan, Arpi Gabrielyan, and Gevorg Martirosyan.
