= Ara Karagyan =

Armenian actor

- Born: Araik Karagyan; February 16, 1963 (age 62); Yerevan, Armenian SSR, Soviet Union
- Education: Yerevan State Institute of Theatre and Cinematography
- Occupation(s): Actor, presenter
- Years active: 1984–present

Ara Karagyan (Armenian: Արա Կարագյան; born February 2, 1963) is an Armenian actor. He is known for his roles as Zorik on In the city. He was a presenter of Mougounini-Boua TV-show.

== Filmography ==
Film
Year	Title	Role	Notes
2011	Ala Bala Nica		
2016	"Apricot Groves"	Barber	

Television and web
Year	Title	Role	Notes
2010-2012	Trapped	Miro	
2012-2013	Maestro		Main cast
2012	Angels' school		Recurring cast
October 1, 2012 – December 31, 2014	In The City (Armenian TV series)	Zorik	Main cast
2015–present	Domino	Alik	Recurring cast
