= In the Army =

In the Army may refer to:

- In the Army (TV series), an Armenian comedy drama television series
- In the Army (The Ren & Stimpy Show), an episode of The Ren & Stimpy Show
