= Syuzanna Melqonyan =

- Born: Yerevan, Armenia
- Occupation: Singer
- Years active: 2011–present

Syuzanna Melqonyan (Armenian: Սյուզաննա Մելքոնյան, born 1993), is an Armenian singer. She took part in Hay Superstar, The Voice of Armenia, X-Factor and Depi Evratesil. During Depi Evratesil she was in the group of Inga Arshakyan and advanced to the top 3. On July 30, she and the Freedom band were the special guests of Arena Live hosted by Garik Papoyan. On May 5, she published her first music video "I found love" via her YouTube account, which was written by Ellen Nahapetyan. In 2017, Melkonyan represented Armenia along with Erna Mir at the New Wave international contest in Sochi and gained the second place. She also took part in the competition called 1 in 360, a national final to select San Marino's entry for the Eurovision Song Contest 2018. The singer is a Grand Prix winner of various contests and festivals since 2011.

== Filmography ==
As herself
Year	Title	Notes
2016-2017	Depi Evratesil 1 (Դեպի Եվրատեսիլ)	Participant
2018	Depi Evratesil 2 (Դեպի Եվրատեսիլ)	Special guest
