= I Zoi (To Pio Omorfo Tragoudi) =

Single by Demy

from the album #1
- Released: 29 October 2012
- Recorded: 2011
- Genre: Pop
- Length: 4:07
- Label: Panik Records
- Songwriter(s): Romy Papadea
- Producer(s): Alex Leon

Demy singles chronology
"Poses Xiliades Kalokairia" (2012)	"I Zoi (To Pio Omorfo Tragoudi)" (2012)	"Ki An Prospatho" (2013)

"I Zoi (To Pio Omorfo Tragoudi)" is a song by Greek singer Demy. It was released as a digital download in [Greece on 29 October 2012 as the fifth single from her debut studio album #1 (2012). The song also peaked at number 1 on the Greek Singles Chart.

== Music video ==
A music video to accompany the release of "I Zoi (To Pio Omorfo Tragoudi)" was first released onto YouTube on 24 November 2012 at a total length of three minutes and forty-one seconds.

== Track listing ==
Digital download
No.	Title	Length
1.	"I Zoi (To Pio Omorfo Tragoudi)"	4:07

== Charts ==
Chart (2012)	Peak position
Greece (IFPI)	1

== Release history ==
Region	Date	Format	Label
Greece	29 October 2012	Digital download	Panik Records
