= Name That Tune (disambiguation) =

Name That Tune is an American television game show that on NBC Radio.

Name That Tune may also refer to:

- Name That Tune (British game show)
- Name that Tune (Armenian game show)
