= In the City =

In the City may refer to:

== Music ==
=== Albums ===
- In the City (The Jam album), 1977
- In the City (Tavares album), 1975
- In the City (Kevin Rudolf album), or the title song
- In the City (Chromatics album), 2010

=== Songs ===
- "In the City" (The Jam song), 1977, title track from the album of the same name
- "In the City" (Madness song), 1982, B-side of the song "Cardiac Arrest"
- "In the City" (Joe Walsh song), 1979, also recorded by the Eagles
- "In the City" (Charli XCX and Sam Smith song), 2023
- "In the City", a song by Bloom 06 from Crash Test 01
- "In the City", a song by Caveman from Caveman
- "In the City", a song by Chromatics from In Shining Violence EP
- "In the City", a song by Good Shoes from Think Before You Speak
- "In the City", a song by Hanson from This Time Around
- "In the City", a song by Lauri Ylönen from New World
- "In the City", a song by Razorlight from Up All Night
- "In the City", a song by White Lion from Fight to Survive
- "In the City", a song by The Who, the B-side from the single "I'm a Boy"

=== Other ===
- In the City (South African festival), an annual music festival that takes place in Johannesburg, South Africa

== Other media ==
- In the City (film), a 2003 Spanish film
- In the City (Armenian TV series), a 2012 Armenian comedy drama television series
- "In My City", a 2012 song by Indian actress Priyanka Chopra
- In the City (American TV series), a 2026 American reality television series, a spin-off of Summer House
- In the City, a video game developed by Deadline Games
