= Hovhannes Davtyan =

Hovhannes Davtyan may refer to:

- Hovhannes Davtyan (judoka)
- Hovhannes Davtyan (actor)
