= Oso O Kosmos Tha Ehi Esena =

"Όσο ο Κόσμος θα έχει Εσένα"

Single by Demy featuring Mike

from the album Rodino Oneiro
- Released: 7 July 2014
- Recorded: 2013
- Genre: Dance
- Length: 3:28
- Label: Panik Records

Demy singles chronology
"Nothing Better" (2014)	"Όσο ο Κόσμος θα έχει Εσένα" (2014)	"Rodino Oneiro" (2014)

"Oso O Kosmos Tha Ehi Esena” (Greek: Όσο ο Κόσμος θα έχει Εσένα, lit. 'As long as the world has you in it') is a song by Greek singer Demy featuring Mike. It was released as a digital download in Greece on 7 July 2014 as the third single from her second studio album Rodino Oneiro (2014). The song peaked at number 1 on the Greek Singles Chart.

== Music video ==
A music video to accompany the release of "Oso O Kosmos Tha Ehi Esena" was first released onto YouTube on 13 May 2014 at a total length of three minutes and twenty-seven seconds.

== Track listing ==
Digital download
No.	Title	Length
1.	"Oso O Kosmos Tha Exei Esena" (featuring Mike) (radio edit)	3:28
2.	"Oso O Kosmos Tha Exei Esena" (ballad)	3:24
3.	"All That I Need (Oso O Kosmos Tha Exei Esena)" (English version)	3:08

== Charts ==
Chart (2014)	Peak position
Greece (IFPI)	1

== Release history ==
Region	Date	Format	Label
Greece	7 July 2014	Digital download	Panik Records
