= Mher Khachatryan =

Mher Khachatryan Մհեր Խաչատրյան
- Born: Mher Khachatryan Մհեր Խաչատրյան; March 21, 1989 (age 36); Yerevan, Armenian SSR, Soviet Union
- Education: Yerevan State University
- Occupation(s): Actor, Presenter, reporter-journalist
- Years active: 2010–present
- Height: 170 cm (5 ft 7 in)

Mher Khachatryan (Armenian: Մհեր Խաչատրյան, born on March 21, 1989), is an Armenian actor and presenter, reporter-journalist.

== Career ==
He is known for his role as Doctor Garik on Domino. He was one of the guests of Name The Tune on February 24 and on April 8, 2016. He has worked in Armnews TV as a reporter-journalist in 2012-2015. He was also one of the presenters of Evening Yerevan. He is currently the co-presenter of Evening Azoyan (with Armenian actor-presenter Hovhannes Azoyan).

== Filmography ==
Television and web
Year	Title	Role	Notes
2015-2017	Domino	Garik	Main Cast
2016	Name The Tune	Himself	2 episodes
