= Romy Papadea =

Greek songwriter

Romy Papadea is a Greek songwriter. Her best-known song is "Hano esena (Χάνω εσένα)" by Despina Vandi. Her sister is Greek singer Demy who represented Greece at the Eurovision Song Contest 2017 in Kyiv, Ukraine. Romy has also written many of Demy's songs and two of them are two of the three candidate songs for the Eurovision Song Contest. One of them is a pop-rock and the other is a dance song in cooperation with songwriter John Ballard. The music of the three candidate songs was written by Greek songwriter/music producer Dimitris Kontopoulos.
