= Rodino Oneiro =

Studio album by Demy
- Released: 22 December 2014
- Recorded: 2013
- Genre: Pop; dance-pop
- Label: Panik Records
- Producer: Alex Leon; Dimitris Kontopoulos; Marios Psimopoulos; OGE; Playmen; Vassilis Gabrielides

Demy chronology
#1 (2012)	Rodino Oneiro (2014)	Demy (2017)

Singles from Rodino Oneiro
- 1. "The Sun" Released: 15 May 2013; 2. "Nothing Better" Released: 5 February 2014; 3. "Oso O Kosmos Tha Ehi Esena" Released: 7 July 2014; 4. "Rodino Oneiro" Released: 8 November 2014; 5. "Proti mou fora" Released: 2015; 6. "Where Is the Love" Released: 6 February 2015; 7. "I Alitheia Moiazei Psema" Released: 2015

Rodino Oneiro is the second studio album by Greek singer Demy, released in Greece and Cyprus on 22 December 2014 by Panik Records. The album includes seven singles, "The Sun", "Nothing Better", "Oso O Kosmos Tha Ehi Esena", "Rodino Oneiro", "Proti mou fora", "Where Is the Love" and "I Alitheia Moiazei Psema". The album has peaked at number 7 on the Greek Albums Chart.

== Singles ==
"The Sun" was released as the lead single from the album on 15 May 2013. The song peaked at number 1 on the Greek Singles Chart. "Nothing Better" was released as the second single from the album on 5 February 2014. "Oso O Kosmos Tha Ehi Esena" was released as the third single from the album on 7 July 2014. The song peaked at number 1 on the Greek Singles Chart. "Rodino Oneiro" was released as the fourth single from the album on 8 November 2014. "Proti mou fora" was released as the fifth single from the album in 2015. "Where Is the Love" was released as the sixth single from the album on 6 February 2015. "I Alitheia Moiazei Psema" was released as the seventh and final single from the album in 2015. The song peaked at number 1 on the Greek Singles Chart.

== Track listing ==
No.	Title	Length
1.	"Rodino Oneiro"	3:31
2.	"Proti Mou Fora" (with Melisses)	3:48
3.	"Oso O Kosmos Tha Ehi Esena" (feat. Mike)	3:28
4.	"I Alitheia Miazei Psema"	4:07
5.	"Where Is the Love" (Angel Stoxx feat. Demy)	3:20
6.	"Anevaino"	3:14
7.	"Esi Tha Dialekseis"	2:53
8.	"The Sun" (Demy & Alex Leon feat. Epsilon)	3:37
9.	"Nothing Better" (Playmen feat. Demy)	3:53
10.	"That Feeling"	3:00
11.	"Anixi" (Demy & Sofia Vossou) (Panik Mix)	3:01
12.	"The Sun" (Demy & Alex Leon feat. Epsilon) (Jesus Cutino & Calles De Cuba Version)	3:26
13.	"You Fooled Me"	3:22
14.	"All That I Need" (Oso O Kosmos Tha Ehi Esena En Version)	3:08
15.	"Chasing the Stars"	3:12

== Release history ==
Region	Date	Format	Label
Greece	22 December 2014	CD, digital download	Panik Records
