= Anati Saqanyan =

Armenian broadcaster, model and actress (born 1991)

Anati Saqanyan Անատի Սաքանյան
- Born: Anati Saqanyan; November 18, 1991 (age 34); Yerevan, Armenia
- Education: Yerevan State Institute of Theater and Cinema
- Occupations: Actress, Broadcaster, Model
- Years active: 2010–present

Anati Saqanyan (Armenian: Անատի Սաքանյան, born on December 2, 1991) is an Armenian broadcaster, model and actress. She is known for her roles as Ruzanna on Full House, Sisianoush on Stone Cage.

== Filmography ==
Television and web
Year	Title	Role	Notes
2012	In The Army (Armenian TV series)	Photographer	Guest Cast
2014	Full House (Armenian TV series)	Ruzanna	Recurring cast
2015-2017	Stone Cage	Sisianoush "Sisi"	Main cast
