= Narek Baveyan =

Armenian singer, songwriter and actor

Narek Baveyan/Նարեկ Բավեյան
- Born: Narek Baveyan; May 19, 1983 (age 41); Vedi, Armenian SSR, Soviet Union
- Education: Komitas State Conservatory of Yerevan
- Occupation(s): Singer, actor, songwriter
- Years active: 2000–present

Narek Marati Baveyan (Armenian: Նարեկ Մարատի Բավեյան, born on April 19, 1983), is an Armenian singer, songwriter and actor. He is known for his role as Norik on Domino TV-series. He was a guest of "White corner" on February 3, 2015 and a guest of "Barter" on October 5, 2014. He played in Bridge of Love musical (2014–2015).

== Filmography ==
Film
Year	Title	Role	Notes
2009	Escape		

Television and web
Year	Title	Role	Notes
2015–present	Domino (Armenian TV series)	Norayr "Norik"	Main Cast

As himself
Year	Title	Notes
2017	Hayastan Jan (Հայաստան Ջան)	Contestant

== Discography ==
=== Singles ===
- 2008 - "Mi togh indz"
- 2009 - "Hasnelu em" (featuring Aratta)
- 2009 - "Ko hogin"
- 2011 - "Khelagar ser" (16+)
- 2011 - "Yekel em paghtsnem"
- 2011 - "Verjin angam"
- 2012 - "Ur gnats"
- 2014 - "Без Тебя" (Without you, Russian, featuring Gevorg Barsamyan)
- 2014 - "Mer metsere"
- 2014 - "Srtis Uzatze"
- 2015 - "Arevik"
- 2016 - "Hasel em"
