= Mia Zografia =

"Μia Zografia (O Kosmos Mas)"

Single by Midenistis featuring Demy

from the album #1
- Released: 11 July 2011
- Length: 3:57
- Label: Panik
- Songwriter(s): Midenistis
- Producer(s): LemonPlay

Demy singles chronology
"Μia Zografia (O Kosmos Mas)" (2011)	"Mono Mprosta" (2011)

"Μia Zografia (O Kosmos Mas)" is a song by Greek singer Demy and Midenistis. It was released as a digital download in Greece on 11 July 2011 as the lead single from her debut studio album #1 (2012).

== Music video ==
A music video to accompany the release of "Μia Zografia" was first released onto YouTube on 8 July 2011 at a total length of three minutes and fifty-six seconds.

== Track listing ==
Digital download
No.	Title	Length
1.	"Mia Zografia"	3:57

== Release history ==
Region	Date	Format	Label
Greece	11 July 2011	Digital download	Panik Records
