= Martuni, Armenia =

City in Gegharkunik, Armenia

Martuni Մարտունի
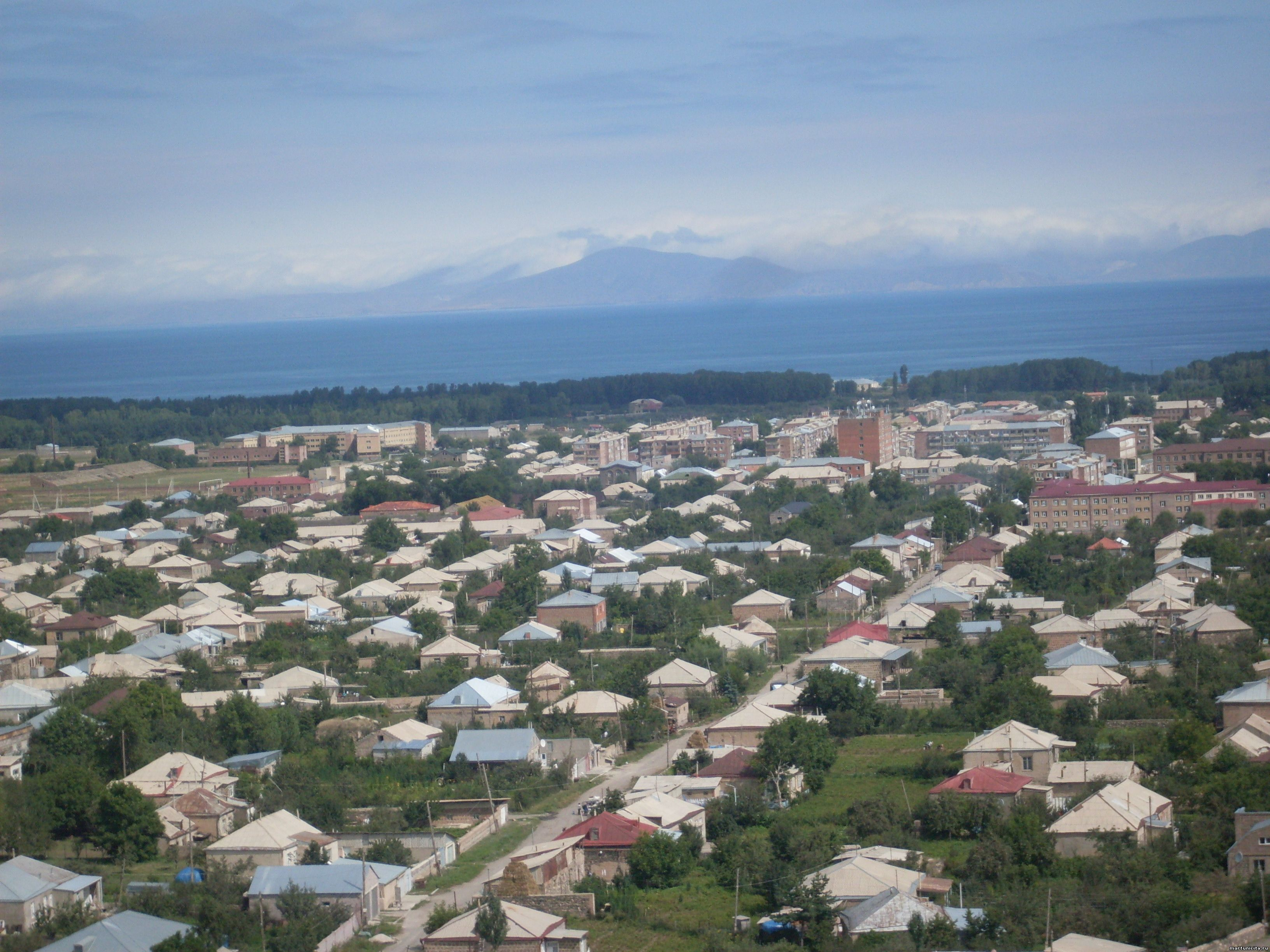
- Martuni with Lake Sevan in the background

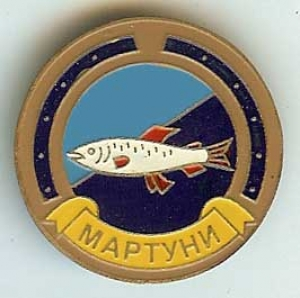
- Coat of arms

- Location within Armenia Location within Gegharkunik
- Coordinates: 40°08′24″N 45°18′23″E
- Country: Armenia
- Province: Gegharkunik
- Municipality: Martuni
- Founded: 1830

Area
  - Total: 10 km^{2} (3.9 sq mi)
- Elevation: 1,950 m (6,400 ft)

Population (2022)
  - Total: 11,287
  - Density: 1,100/km^{2} (2,900/sq mi)
- Time zone: UTC+4 (AMT)

Martuni (Armenian: Մարտունի), is a town in the Martuni Municipality of the Gegharkunik Province of Armenia, located on the southern shores of Lake Sevan. As of the 2011 census, the town had a population of 12,894. As per the 2016 official estimate the population of Martuni is around 11,200. As of the 2022 census, the town had a population of 11,287.

== Etymology ==
During the medieval period, the area of present-day Martuni was known as Mets Kznut. Between 1830 and 1922 it was called Nerkin Gharanlugh. In 1926, it was named Martuni in honor of the bolshevik leader and Chairman of the Council of People's Commissars of Armenia Aleksandr Myasnikyan, whose nom-de-guerre was Martuni.

== Climate ==
Climate data for Martuni (1991-2020)
Month	Jan	Feb	Mar	Apr	May	Jun	Jul	Aug	Sep	Oct	Nov	Dec	Year
Record high °C (°F)	10.5 (50.9)	11 (52)	18.4 (65.1)	25.1 (77.2)	27.6 (81.7)	30 (86)	33.3 (91.9)	32.3 (90.1)	30.6 (87.1)	23.5 (74.3)	19.5 (67.1)	14.6 (58.3)	33.3 (91.9)
Daily mean °C (°F)	−4.6 (23.7)	−4.2 (24.4)	0.0 (32.0)	5.6 (42.1)	10.2 (50.4)	14.2 (57.6)	17.0 (62.6)	17.0 (62.6)	13.7 (56.7)	8.9 (48.0)	2.4 (36.3)	−2.2 (28.0)	6.5 (43.7)
Record low °C (°F)	−21.0 (−5.8)	−24.6 (−12.3)	−24.8 (−12.6)	−15.4 (4.3)	−3.8 (25.2)	−0.4 (31.3)	−0.1 (31.8)	3.1 (37.6)	−2.0 (28.4)	−6.0 (21.2)	−15.7 (3.7)	−20.5 (−4.9)	−24.8 (−12.6)
Average precipitation mm (inches)	30.0 (1.18)	30.0 (1.18)	54.2 (2.13)	64.7 (2.55)	78.6 (3.09)	63.7 (2.51)	53.0 (2.09)	32.1 (1.26)	31.7 (1.25)	39.5 (1.56)	39.1 (1.54)	25.8 (1.02)	542.4 (21.36)
Average precipitation days (≥ 1 mm)	4.4	5.5	8.2	10.5	13.1	10.3	6.8	4	5	6.6	5.6	4.9	84.9
Average relative humidity (%)	67.4	67.9	67	66	68.3	70.4	75.5	72.7	67.5	64.9	64.5	66.1	68.2
Mean monthly sunshine hours	144.4	150.1	177.6	183.9	236.8	289.2	298.6	298.7	258.1	199	160.9	145.8	2,543.1
Source: NOAA

== Culture ==
Martuni is home to the Holy Mother of God Church dating back to 1886. There is also an Iron Age fort excavated in 1997 by an Armenian-Italian team.

Armenian refugees from Alashkert who moved to Martuni brought over their tradition of hemp seed kufteh. The kufteh is most frequently consumed during lent. Since cannabis and hemp are derived from the same plant, there have been times when the Martuni police have cracked down on local hemp bushes cultivation, incorrectly assuming the plants were involved with narcotic production.

== Economy ==
Martuni is home to the "Arev-1" bread factory founded in 1995, and the "Golden Lens" coffee processing plant founded in 1998.

Starting 2015, 10 organizations came together to develop a revival program in a village on the 100-year commemoration of the Armenian genocide. There were economic, health, child development programs, initiated by The Armenian Missionary Association of America (the AMAA), supported by World Vision Armenia, COAF, SHEN and other organizations.

== Sport ==
The town was the original home of Armenian Premier League team FC Alashkert. The club was named for the Western Armenian town of Alashkert (modern day Eleşkirt) from where a large number of refugees came to Martuni after the Armenian genocide.

The club was founded in 1990 and represented Martuni in the 1992 Armenian Premier League, the first season of football in Armenia after the country's independence. They finished bottom of the Second stage, Relegation Group group and were relegated to the Armenian First League. After that first season in the top flight the club pulled out of tournament football.

The club returned to play in the 1998 edition of the First League where it finished sixth. Yet after that season it pulled out again. Martuni hasn't had a team since.

In 2011 local businessman Bagrat Novojan revived the name of FC Alashkert. Although the club represented both Martuni and the marz of Gegharkunik in the 2012–13 Armenian First League, in reality the club played elsewhere. He moved the club to the capital Yerevan and the Nairi Stadium.

== Gallery ==
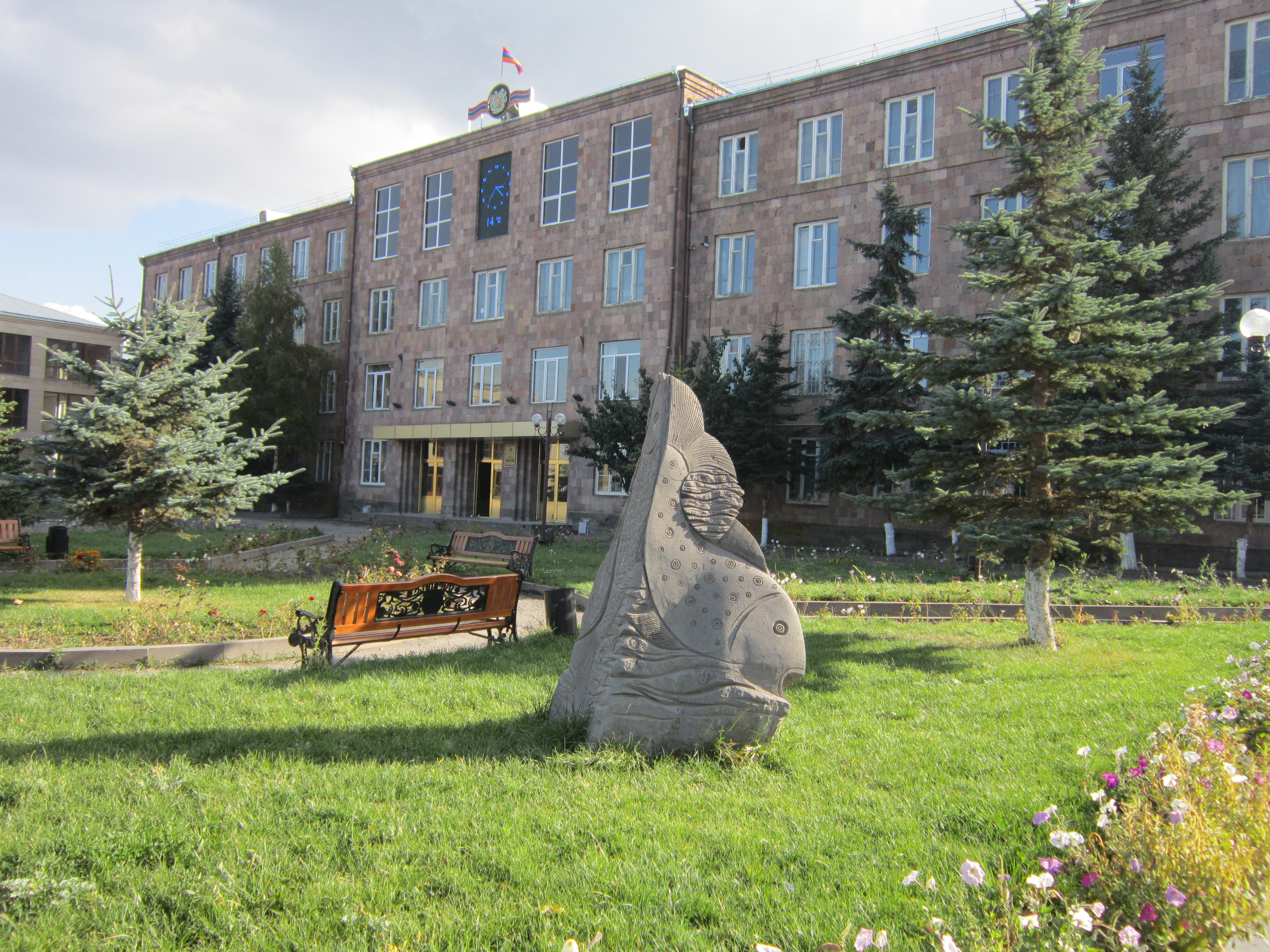
Martuni central square

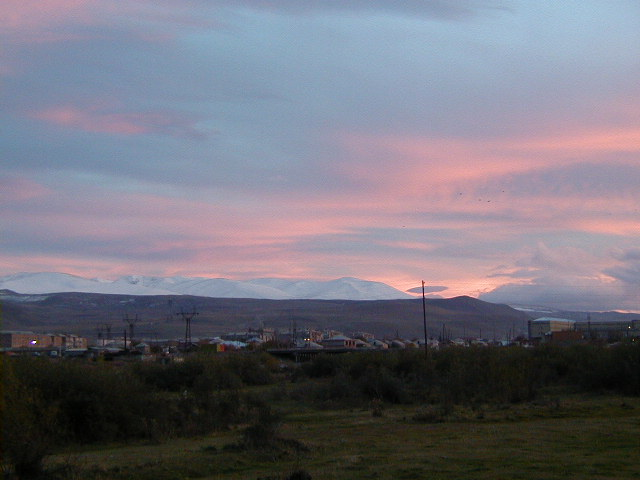
Martuni at dusk

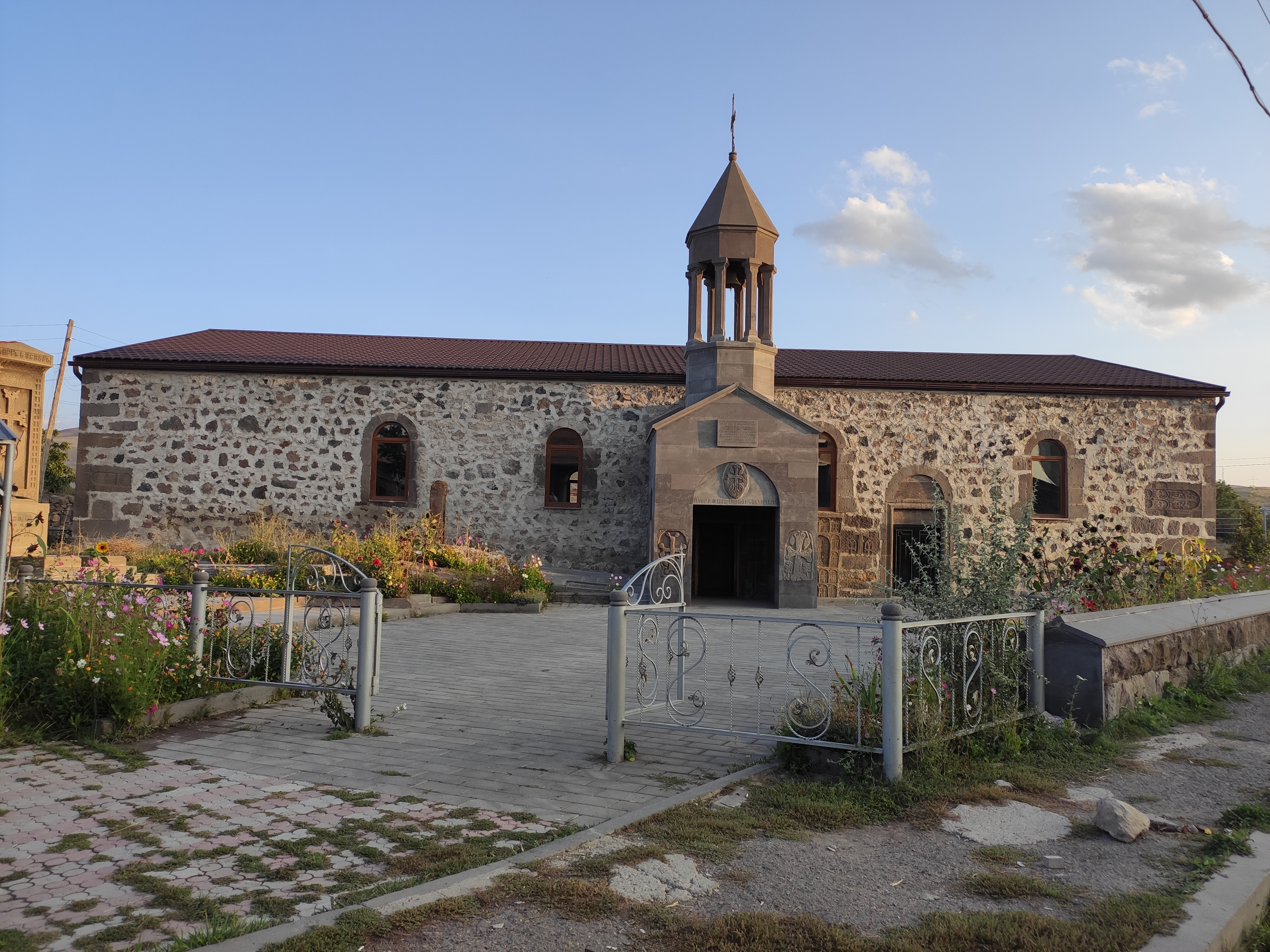
Holy Mother of God Church in Martuni

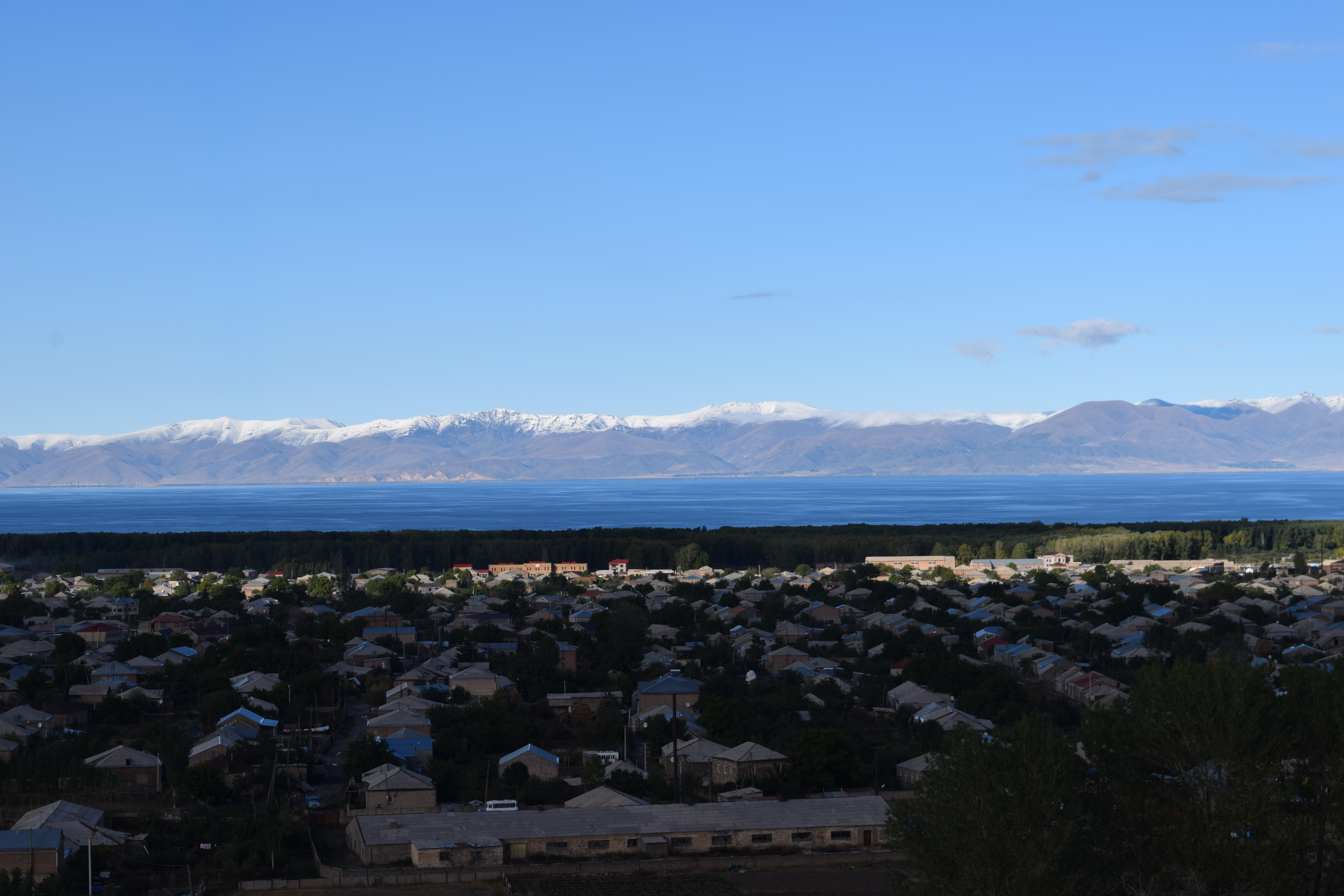
Martuni and Lake Sevan

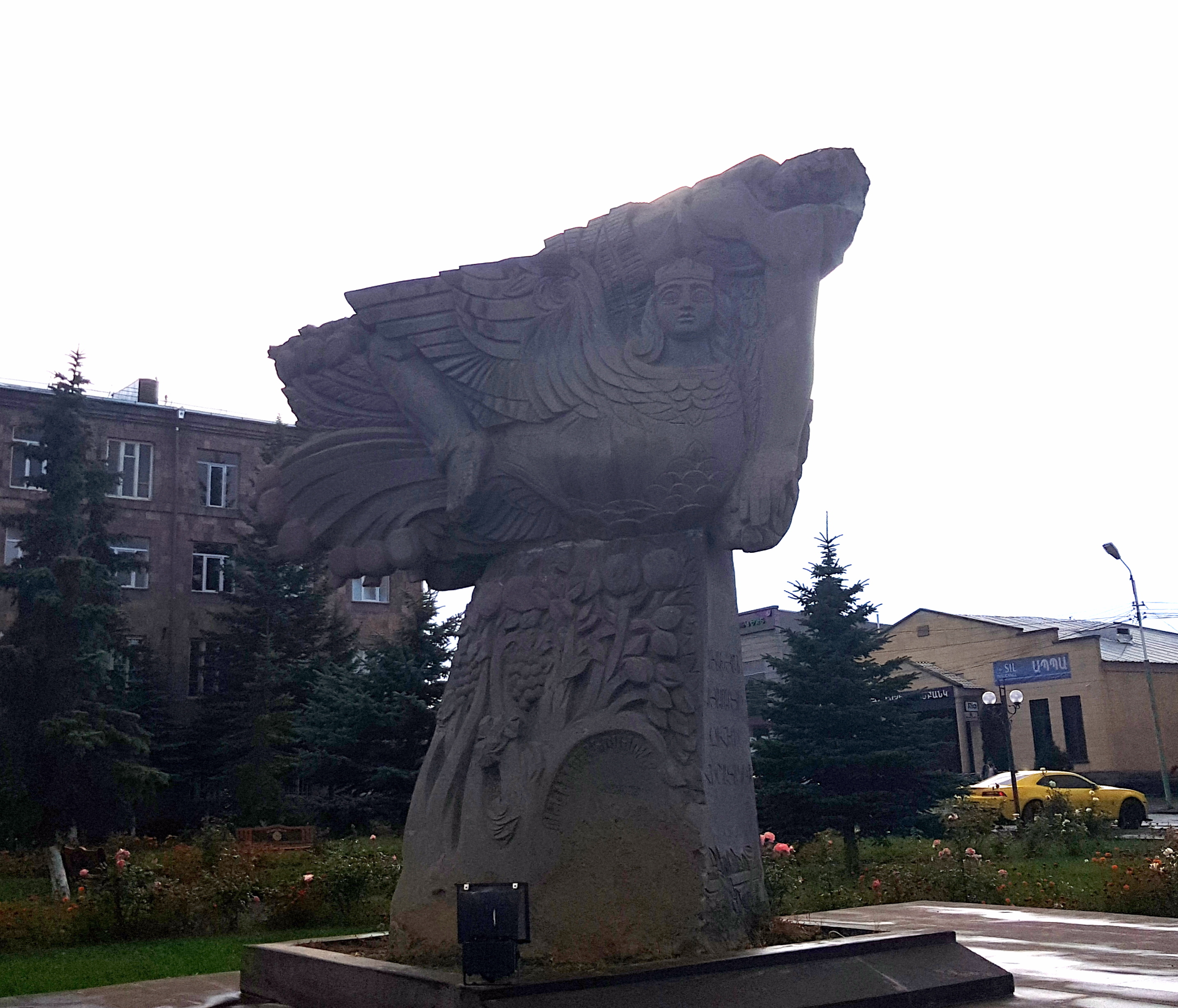
War memorial

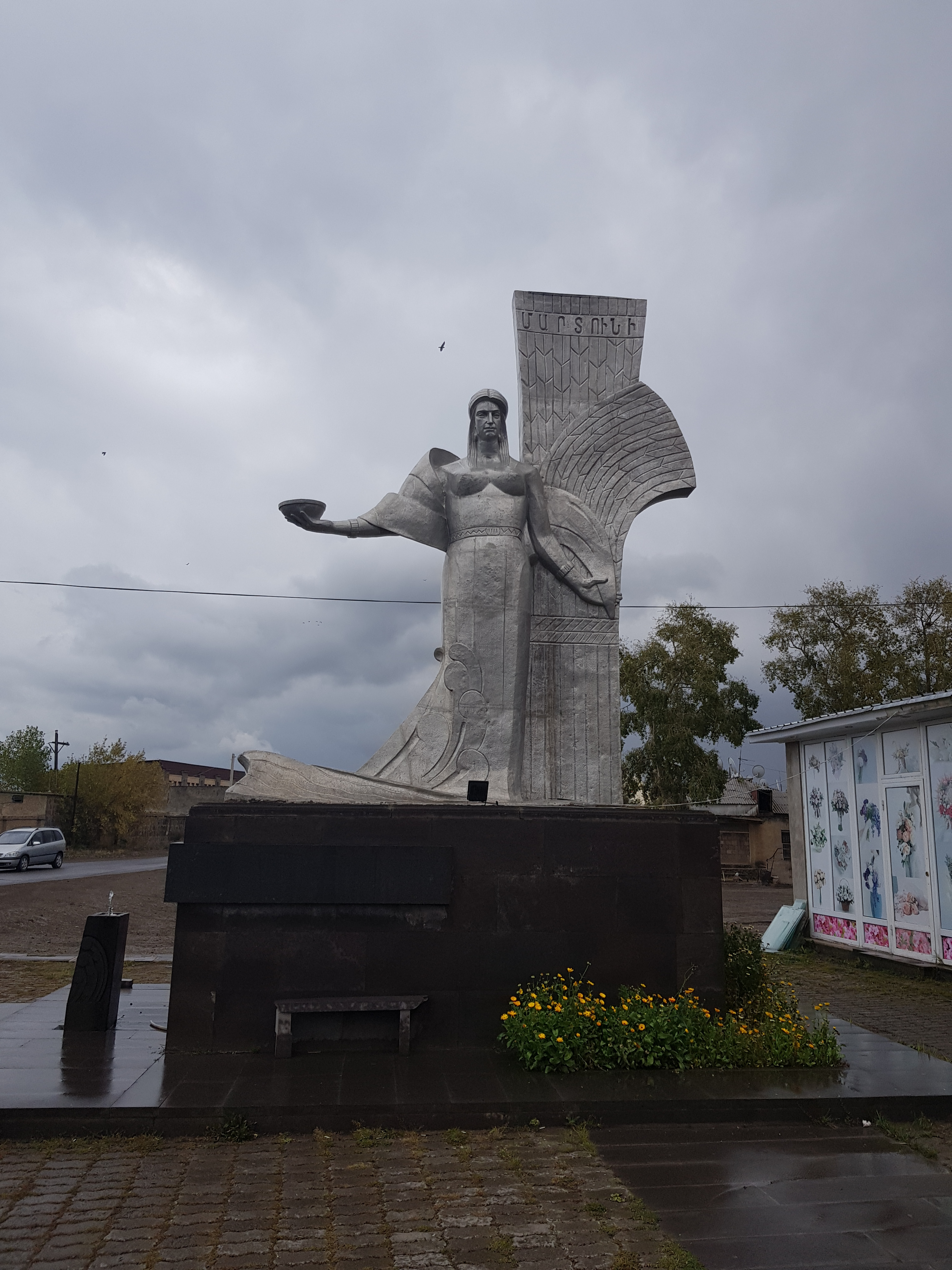
Monument

== Notable people ==
- Saro Gevorgyan, singer and winner of 2021 New Wave competition.

== International relations ==
=== Partnerships ===
- Kavala, Greece, since 2001.
