= Stone Cage =

- Genre: Situation comedy
- Developed by: Vache Tovmasyan
- Starring: Vache Tovmasyan; Anati Saqanyan; Rafayel Yeranosyan; Rudolph Ghevondyan; Armoush; Anna Manucharyan
- Composer: DUETRO STUDIO
- Country of origin: Armenia
- Original language: Armenian
- No. of seasons: 4
- No. of episodes: 96

Production
- Executive producer: Greta Barseghyan
- Producer: Vache Tovmasyan
- Production locations: Yerevan, Armenia
- Editors: Grigor Gevorgyan; Van Grigoryan
- Running time: 20-35 minutes

Original release
- Network: ATV
- Release: December 8, 2015 – June 16, 2017

Stone Cage or Stone Grief (Armenian: Քարե Դարդ, romanized: K'are Dard) is an Armenian comedy drama television series developed by Vache Tovmasyan. The series premiered on ATV on December 8, 2015. The series was filmed in Yerevan, Armenia.

== Premise ==
A young genius scientist invents a time machine and plans to test it before the Scientific Committee. But his idle and debt-ridden friend, found in the laboratory under certain circumstances, activates the time machine which takes him to the Stone Age where he has to live with a wild tribe because of the faulty machine. And it all starts here. Stone Age turns into a real Stone Agony!

== Series overview ==
Season	Episodes	Originally released	
Season	Episodes	First released	Last released
1	24	December 7, 2015	February 25, 2016
2	24	April 19, 2016	July 7, 2016

== Cast and characters ==
- Vache Tovmasyan as Moso
- Anati Saqanyan as Sisianush
- Rafayel Yeranosyan as Babal
- Rudolph Ghevondyan as Hovsep
- Armush as Gogo (season 1–2)
- Anna Manucharyan as Nini
- Diana Muradyan as Lolo (season 1–2)
- Hakob Hakobyan as Mamouk (season 1)
- Levon Varpetyan as Koko (season 1–2)
- Arman Hovhannisyan as Didi (season 1)
- Alina Martirosyan as Vivi (season 2–4)
- Arame Gevorgyan as Hihi (season 2–4)
- Emil Galstyan as Soso (season 2–4)
