= Demy (album) =

Studio album by Demy
- Released: 18 April 2017
- Recorded: 2016
- Genre: Pop; dance-pop
- Label: Panik Records

Demy chronology
| Rodino Oneiro (2014) | Demy (2017) |

Singles from Demy
- 1. "This Is Love" Released: 6 March 2017

Demy is a studio album by the Greek singer Demy. The album is the first collection of all of her new and previous English songs. The album was released in Greece and Cyprus on 18 April 2017 by Panik Records. The album includes the single "This Is Love". The album has peaked at number 13 on the Greek Albums Chart.

== Singles ==
"This Is Love" was released as the lead single from the album on 6 March 2017. The song peaked at number 3 on the Greek Singles Chart. On 13 January 2017, Demy was announced as the Greek representative for the Eurovision Song Contest 2017. Through a national final which was held on 6 March 2017, it was revealed that "This Is Love" would represent the country in Kyiv, Ukraine. In the first Semi-Final on 9 May 2017, Demy qualified for the final. The Final took place on 13 May 2017 where she finished in 19th place.

== Track listing ==
Standard listing
| No. | Title | Length |
|---|---|---|
| 1. | "This Is Love" | 3:00 |
| 2. | "When The Morning Comes" | 3:07 |
| 3. | "Angels" | 3:02 |
| 4. | "Fallin" (Playmen feat. Demy) | 4:00 |
| 5. | "Nothing Better" (Playmen feat. Demy) | 3:53 |
| 6. | "The Sun" (Demy & Alex Leon feat. Epsilon) | 3:37 |
| 7. | "Chasing the Stars" (Emil Lonam Remix) | 3:12 |
| 8. | "Where Is the Love" (Angel Stoxx feat. Demy) | 3:20 |
| 9. | "Some Hearts Are Meant to Fall" | 2:58 |
| 10. | "One Love" | 4:07 |
| 11. | "You Fooled Me" | 3:22 |
| 12. | "That Feeling" | 3:00 |

== Charts ==
=== Weekly charts ===
| Chart (2017) | Peak position |
|---|---|
| Greece (IFPI) | 13 |

== Release history ==
| Region | Date | Format | Label |
|---|---|---|---|
| Greece | 18 April 2017 | CD, digital download | Panik Records |
