= The Sun (song) =

Single by Demy and Alex Leon featuring Epsilon

from the album Rodino Oneiro
- Released: 15 May 2013
- Recorded: 2011
- Genre: Dance
- Length: 3:26
- Label: Panik Records

Demy singles chronology
| "Ki An Prospatho" (2013) | "The Sun" (2013) | "Μeno" (2013) |

"The Sun" is a song by Greek singer Demy and Alex Leon featuring Epsilon. It was released as a digital download in Greece on 15 May 2013 as the lead single from her second studio album Rodino Oneiro (2014). The song peaked at number 1 on the Greek Singles Chart.

== Music video ==
A music video to accompany the release of "The Sun" was first released onto YouTube on 16 May 2013 at a total length of three minutes and thirty-eight seconds.

== Track listing ==
Digital download
| No. | Title | Length |
|---|---|---|
| 1. | "The Sun" (featuring Epsilon) | 3:26 |

== Charts ==
| Chart (2013) | Peak position |
|---|---|
| Greece (IFPI) | 1 |

== Release history ==
| Region | Date | Format | Label |
|---|---|---|---|
| Greece | 15 May 2013 | Digital download | Panik Records |
