= In the Army (TV series) =

- Genre: Comedy drama
- Developed by: Hayk Kbeyan; Ashot Hakobyan; Movses Gasparyan
- Starring: Artyom Karapetyan; George Chulyan; Emil Galstyan; George Manukyan; Gor Martirosyan; Hovhannes Davtyan
- Country of origin: Armenia
- Original language: Armenian
- No. of seasons: 3
- No. of episodes: 681

Production
- Producer: Hunan Soghoyan
- Production locations: Yerevan, Armenia
- Running time: 35-40 minutes
- Production company: Shant TV

Original release
- Network: Shant TV
- Release: August 31, 2009 – August 3, 2012

Related
- In The City (Armenian TV series)

In The Army (Armenian: Բանակում Banakum) is an Armenian comedy drama television series. The series premiered on Shant TV on August 31, 2009. It had six-hundred-eighty-one episodes.

The series took place in Yerevan, Armenia.

== Series overview ==
The young boys join the army and find themselves in another world, where there are other rules of living. The boys from Yerevan, Gyumri, Lori, Martuni, and boys from other regions gather under one roof, to defend their homeland.

Each of the boys has his fears and shortcomings, which are presented with humor.

The course of the service of the soldiers is full of humorous stories and adventures.

== Cast and characters ==
- Artyom Karapetyan portrays Karlen Minasyan
- Emil Galstyan portrays Hambardzum Hambardzumyan
- Vahe Petrosyan portrays Qajik Aslanyan
- Hovhannes Davtyan portrays Mkho Arevshatyan
- Hamlet Adiyan portrays Rshtun Rshtoyan
- Anahit Kirakosyan portrays Susik
- Gevorg Manukyan portrays Melo Hovsepyan
- Sargis Vardanyan portrays Artyom
- Armen Miqaelyan portrays Gago
- Vahagn Sargsyan portrays Hamo
- Armen Soghoyan portrays Baghdasaryan
- Sepuh Apikyan portrays Bshtikyan
- Armen Zakharyan portrays Papik Djamshoyan
- Anati Saqanyan portrays Photographer
- Sona Melqonyan portrays Lilith
- Nerses Hovhannisyan portrays Ara Haroutyunyan
- Gevorg Chulyan portrays Samvel Musaelyan
- Vahagn Khachatryan portrays Varos Varosyan
- Gor Harutyunyan portrays Varujan Danielyan
- Artur Hovsepyan portrays Peto
- Vache Tovmasyan portrays Tiko
- Armush portrays Serjant Gazazyan
- Vahan Tovmasyan portrays Makaryan
- Gevorg Grigoryan portrays Mher Baroyan
- Rafayel Tsaturyan portrays Mrdo
