= In the City (Armenian TV series) =

Armenian comedy drama television series

- Genre: Comedy drama
- Developed by: Hayk Kbeyan; Ashot Hakobyan; Movses Gasparyan
- Country of origin: Armenia
- Original language: Armenian
- No. of seasons: 4
- No. of episodes: 527

Production
- Production locations: Yerevan, Armenia
- Running time: 35-40 minutes
- Production company: Shant TV

Original release
- Network: Shant TV
- Release: October 1, 2012 – December 31, 2014

Related
- In The Army (Armenian TV series)

In The City (Armenian: Քաղաքում Qaghaqum) is an Armenian comedy drama television series. The series premiered on Shant TV on October 1, 2012.

The series takes place in Yerevan, Armenia.

== Series overview ==
The show is a continuation of the series In The Army, showing the life of the soldiers after they left the army.

== Cast and characters ==
- Hayk Petrosyan portrays Narek
- Emil Galstyan portrays Hambartzum Hambartzumyan
- Vahe Petrosyan portrays Qajik Aslanyan
- Hovhannes Davtyan portrays Mkho Arevshatyan
- Movses Nikoghosyan portrays Karbit
- Hakob Hakobyan portrays Karo
- Diana Grigoryan portrays Iren Arevshatyan
- Ara Karagyan portrays Zorik
- Levon Muradyan portrays Vram Arevshatyan
- Tamara Charkhifalaqyan portrays Margarita Arevshatyan
- Anais Sardaryan portrays Anoushik
- Tigran Gyulumyan portrays Vrej
- Artur Petrosyan portrays Mkrtich
- Siranush Esayan portrays Srbuhi
- Hamlet Adiyan portrays Rshtun Rshtoyan
- Sona Melqonyan portrays Lilith
- Sona Matevosyan portrays Sofa
- Gor Harutyunyan portrays Varuj Danielyan
- Anahit Kirakosyan portrays Susik
- Gevorg Manukyan portrays Melo
- Sargis Vardanyan portrays Artyom
- Armen Miqaelyan portrays Gago
- Vahagn Sargsyan portrays Hamo
