= Anahit Hakobyan =

- Born: 17 July 1997 (age 29); Talin, Armenia
- Genres: Pop, Folk
- Occupation: Singer
- Years active: 2010-present

Anahit Hakobyan (Armenian: Անահիտ Հակոբյան, born on 17 July 1997) is an Armenian singer. She won the New Wave competition in 2024.

== Biography ==
In 2005, Anahit Hakobyan entered the Yerevan Music School named after Alexander Achemyan, department of Folk Singing, where she performed as a soloist. She received her higher education at the Caucasus Studies Department of the History Faculty of Yerevan State University.

== Career ==
In 2010, Anahit Hakobyan participated in "Stars 2 (Armenian: Աստղիկներ)" a project by Shant TV, and advanced to the final stage. That same year, she was honored as a laureate at the Republican festival of Russian song, "The song is a bridge of friendship."

2011 was a notable year for Hakobyan; she won the "Golden Voice" Republican competition-festival. That same year she was awarded the title of 1st class laureate at the 3rd International Competition-Festival "Renaissance", which was held to commemorate the 20th anniversary of the Republic of Armenia. She also received a gold medal and competed in the final stage of the Armenian Junior Eurovision Song Contest.

In 2012, Hakobyan performed in several concert programs organized by the Ministry of Defense of RA and received multiple awards for her performances. She continued to participate in competitive music programs, reaching the finals of the Armenian "X Factor" in 2014 and placing in the top three female contestants. In 2017, Hakobyan was among the top ten vocalists in "The Voice of Armenia" TV show.

Hakobyan's international recognition grew when she won the "Berliner Perle" international competition in Germany in 2018. In 2024, Hakobyan released her first song and music video titled "Another World". That same year, she represented Armenia at the New Wave 2024 international song contest in Sochi, where she received the highest appreciation from the jury members and became the winner.

On December 8, 2024, Anahit Hakobyan performed at the world-renowned Dolby Theatre during the Armenian Music Video Awards ceremony, where she received a special award.

In May 2025, the singer presented her new musical prayer titled “Sky of the Armenian”.

=== "New Wave 2024" ===
Anahit competed in the "New Wave 2024" competition with these three songs, earning a total of 222 points and becoming the absolute winner.

| Song | Philipp Kirkorov | Anna Asti | Igor Matvienko | Ani Lorak | Sergey Lazarev | Oleg Gazmanov | Larisa Dolina | Igor Krutoy | Nikolay Baskov | Total |
|---|---|---|---|---|---|---|---|---|---|---|
| "Jan Jan" | 8 | 8 | 9 | 10 | 8 | 9 | 9 | 8 | - | 69 |
| "The Armenian's Sky" (Armenian: Հայի երկինքը) | 10 | 10 | 10 | 10 | - | 10 | 10 | 10 | 10 | 80 |
| "My Way" | 8 | 10 | 8 | 9 | 10 | 8 | 10 | 10 | - | 73 |
