= Demy (singer) =

Greek singer (born 1991)

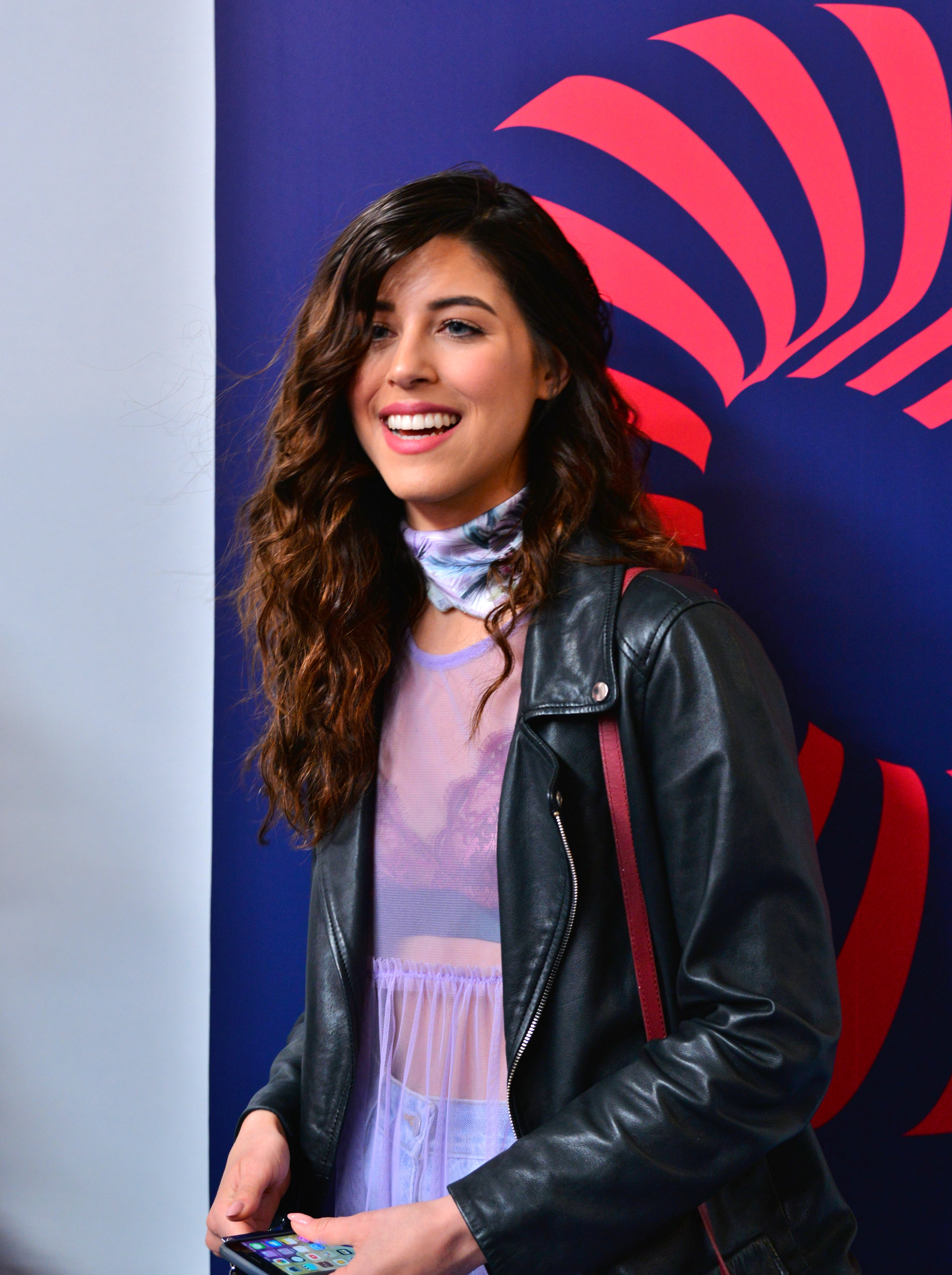
- Demy at a press conference during Eurovision 2017

Background information
- Born: Dimitra Papadea; 21 August 1991 (age 35); Athens, Greece
- Genres: Pop; R&B; dance
- Occupations: Singer; songwriter
- Years active: 2011–present
- Label: Panik Records
- Website: panikmusic.gr/artist/demy/

Dimitra Papadea (Greek: Δήμητρα Παπαδέα, IPA: [ˈðimitra papaˈðe.a]; born 21 August 1991), known professionally as Demy, is a Greek singer. She is signed with the Greek independent label Panik Records. She has released two studio albums, "#1" in 2012, which became platinum and "Rodino Oniro" in 2014, which became gold. In 2017, she released "Demy", a collection of all of her English songs and later she released the album "Kontra", including two new songs and older songs and collaborations that had not been included in an album up to that time. Demy has achieved eight No.1 songs and two No.1 EPs (Extended Plays) on the Greek charts so far. She also combined music and acting by taking part in five musicals from 2012 to 2017.

Since the beginning of her career, Demy has been nominated 30 times for MAD Video Music Awards. Up to now, she has won 11 VMAs, including "Best New Artist" and "Best Female Artist" and she is the fourth most awarded artist in the history of the Greek VMAs. She has been awarded by the "MAD VMA Cyprus" (Annual Cyprus Awards) and by the "SuperFM Radio Cyprus". Also, she won at the MTV Europe Music Awards (EMA) in the category "Best Greek Act", among other Greek artists and has been chosen as the favourite Greek artist at the international Nickelodeon Kids' Choice Awards 2018.

In 2017, she represented Greece in the Eurovision Song Contest 2017, finishing in 19th place in the Grand Final.

== Biography ==
At the age of five, she started taking piano lessons, something she continues to do to this day. Also, she currently takes vocal lessons as well. Jazz, Soul, Rock and Roll, and RandB are cited as musical influences. Her first favorite song growing up was "I'm Like a Bird" by Nelly Furtado. Apart from singing professionally, she is also a law school student in Athens. She has stated that she still aspires to finish law school, and not devote herself to music exclusively, even though her popularity as a musician is increasing. Her father (Epaminondas Papadeas) and sister (Romy Papadea) are also attorneys in Papadeas Law firm. Her mother Elena Boubouli is a Greek-American school owner of Masterlingua and Director of Studies for Epimorphosi Higher Education and Europe – Studies (medical studies abroad).

== Career ==
=== 2011–2012: Professional debut ===
Demy first appeared in Midenistis' song, Mia Zografia which became a big hit in Greece and Cyprus. It received two awards from the MAD Video Music Awards 2012, the one for the best video clip Hip Hop/Urban and the other for the duet of the year. A new single, "Poses Hiliades Kalokeria" (How Many Thousand Summers) was released in June 2012 and quickly reached No.1 on the iTunes Greece song chart. The song also reached No.1 on 7 July 2012 Billboard Greece Digital Songs chart, and remained in the top spot for 9 consecutive weeks, and 10 weeks in total. It also became a success on Greek radio, reaching No. 1 on the official Greek airplay chart. She also sings the lead vocals on Playmens' "Fallin". Some of her others songs are: "Pes Pos Me Thes," "Mia Zografia," "Mono Mprosta," and "Kratise Me." On 25 June 2012 she performed on the Greece, You Have Talent finale, singing a medley of her recent releases (Mia Zografia, Mono Mbrosta, and Poses Xiliades Kalokairia). On 6 July 2012, two new songs were released on YouTube: A "Poses Hiliades Kalokairia" dance remix, and "Love Light," an English language version of the "Poses Hiliades Kalokairia" dance remix. Both songs have also been released as digital singles. On 30 July 2012, the video for "Love Light" was released by Panik In the summer of 2012 she embarked on a tour that included performances in Greece, Cyprus and Russia. On 28 July 2012, Demy, along with Playmen, performed "Fallin" at the Europa Plus Live music festival in Moscow, Russia. The song has become popular in Russia, and has reached No. 1 on the Europa Plus Chart, the radio station of the organizers of the festival. On 21 September 2012, she made an appearance at the Amita Motion "Day of Positive Energy" music festival. She performed with other members of her record label. On 22 October 2012, her new single, "I Zoi" (The Life), was released. A 24-second teaser was released on YouTube on 17 October 2012 In December 2012, it has been announced that she will be starring in the musical "Fame" at the "Ellinikou Kosmou" theater in Piraeus. It is also her desire to one day record songs that she herself has written. In winter 2012–2013 Demy appeared along Cypriot superstar Anna Vissi in Vissi's show LAV at Kentro Athinon, which was one of the most successful shows of the year.

Demy's first full-length studio album, No.1 was released in late 2012 according to her record label. She had confirmed via Twitter in September 2012 that she was in the studio working on the new album. The album included ten tracks including two songs in English. The album also included her big hit in Greece with the Greek rap singer Midenistis "Mia Zografia".

=== 2013–2014 ===
Demy performed "Believe" with Dima Bilan in the Greek final for Eurovision Song Contest 2013 in Greece. In May 2013 Demy released a summer song in English called "The Sun", along with producer Alex Leon and Greek rapper Epsilon, and became a big hit in Greece

In March 2014 an official video was launched by Playmen which features Demy for the song 'Nothing Better'. The song was directed by Yiannis Papadakos and was published by Panik Records. After that in May 2014 she released one more summer hit called "Oso O Kosmos Tha Exei Esena", along with the Greek rap singer Mike, and reached No.1 in Greece and Cyprus. It received one award from the MAD Video Music Awards 2015, for the duet of the year. On 22 December she released her second album, "Rodino Oneiro", which included 15 songs.

=== 2015–2016 ===
During the period of December 2014 to February 2015 Demy was performing in a night club, called "Fever", along with Despina Vandi and Nikos Oikonomopoulos. Also, that year was part of the Jury in a Talent Show, called "The Music School", which was displayed in the Greek channel,"Mega". During the summer of 2015 she had a lead role in one more Musical, "The Sound of Music", and the tickets during the tour were sold out!. In December 2015, it was announced that she will be performing in Casablanca Music Hall along with Nina Lotsari. Her performances there will be quite different from those she used to give since she will sing in funky and jazz rhythm instead of pop.

On 27 January 2016, the musical Aadam's Family was premiered at the Vempo Theatre and Demy embodied the role of Wednesday Addams along with well known actors such as Antonis Kafentzopoulos and Maria Solomou. Demy also appeared in Madwalk 2016 where she sang her new single "Tha meineis feugontas" and she walked on the catwalk for Tsakiris Mallas along with Doretta Papadimitriou. On 10 May 2016, Demy along with DiGi and the rock band RadioAct released the soundtrack of the first Greek action film "Short Fuse"

=== 2017–2018 (International Competitions) ===
Eurovision Song Contest 2017

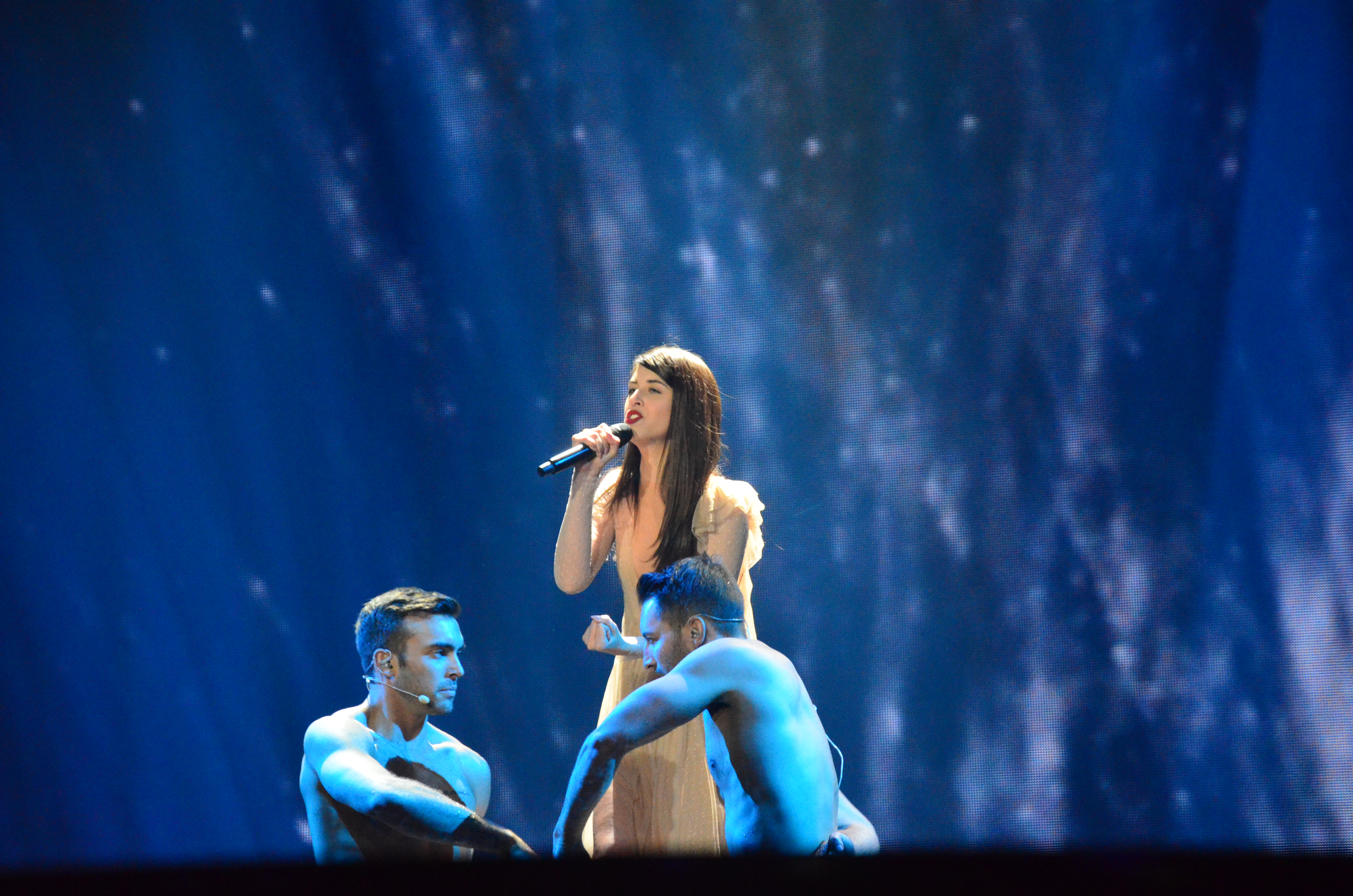
Demy with her 2 dancers, Iasonas Mandilas and Markos Yiakoumoglou

On 13 January 2017, Demy was announced as the Greek representative in the Eurovision Song Contest 2017 held in Kyiv, Ukraine. Demy collaborated with the "Dream Team" Dimitris Kontopoulos and Fokas Evangelinos. On 6 March 2017, it was selected that "This Is Love" was the Greek song at Kyiv. In the Semi-final 1 on 9 May 2017, Greece and Demy qualified for the final, to be held on 13 May 2017. She finished in 19th place with 77 points, 48 from the juries and 29 from the televoting.

New Wave Festival 2018

From 4 to 9 September 2018, Demy participated to the New Wave Festival held in Sochi, Russia, representing Greek popular music. On the competition days, she performed ABBA's "The Winner Takes It All", winning 98 from 100 possible points, and "The Children of Piraeus" by Manos Hatzidakis, switching English and Greek lyrics to win 97 more points. Demy ended the competition by introducing her new English song "Too Late", which got her a perfect score. She finished in 3rd place with 295 points from the jury. (Note: Her official page on Panik Records and a Greek article on Paron (news website) read that she finished 2nd. However, based on the Greek Eurovision Fanclub she ended 3rd. There has been a tie between participants possibly being responsible for this conflicting information. Nevertheless, based on footage from the competition, her official and final ranking is without debate 3rd place. (View next reference))

=== 2018–2019 ===
Perimenontas ti Nona (movie)

In 2018, Demy was cast as one of the main characters, Faidra, in the Greek comedy movie Waiting for the Godmother (Greek: Περιμένοντας τη Νονά) from Odeon Entertainment. The first trailer dropped on 14 November 2018 and on 13 December 2018, Panik Records released the video clip for her soundtrack "Έλα" featuring scenes from the film. The movie itself was released on 17 January 2019, but did not become very successful, getting a disappointing average score of 6,1/10 on IMDb. Demy's performance and the overall experience, however, did get praised by her fans.

On 15 February 2019, Demy released a song with one of her movie's co-star, Katerina Papoutsaki, titled 'Dipla Mou', which video clip also featured scenes from the film.

Retrospective (album)

On 24 May 2019, Demy released her first and so far (Note: 20 June 2023) only album in which she left the Pop genre for a more traditional one. Her album 'Retrospective' is full of older Greek songs' covers. One of them, for example, is the cover of Mikis Theodorakis's 'Mirtia'. The album was published by Panik Oxygen, (Note: They are the one taking care of all the more relaxed or traditional Greek music that comes from Panik Records (Source: https://www.youtube.com/@PanikRecordsTube)) a sublabel of Panik Records.

=== 2020–2021 ===
To this day, (Note: 20 June 2023) the year 2020 is the only year of Demy's career, in which she didn't produce a videoclip (Note: 'Sta Kokkina' was released on the 28 December 2020, but the videoclip was released early 2021) as the lead artist. Nevertheless, she was featured on two singles. Firstly on 18 March 2020, she performed the spoken part of Tasos Xiarcho's single 'An' and then on 30 April 2020, she contributed on the Apon's and Oge's single 'Adieksodo' by singing the first third of the song.

On 7 March 2021, Demy organized an online concert from home due to the COVID-19 pandemic and the popularity of the concept as travel was restricted. "LIVE-ing at Home" was streamed on YouTube and its recording can still be found on Demy's official channel. Demy was backed by her four-member band and performed some of her own songs as well as some of her favorite Greek and English songs.

== Discography ==
=== Studio albums ===
Title	Details	Peak chart positions	Certifications
Title	Details	GRE	Certifications
#1	Released: 19 December 2012; Label: Panik Records; Formats: CD, CD/DVD, digital download	1	IFPI Greece: Platinum; Cyprus: Platinum
Rodino Oneiro Greek: Ρόδινο Όνειρο [Rodino Oniro]	Released: 22 December 2014; Label: Panik Records; Formats: CD, CD/DVD, digital download	7	IFPI Greece: Gold; Cyprus: Gold
Kontra Greek: Κόντρα	Released: 27 October 2017; Label: Panik Records; Formats: CD, CD/DVD, digital download		
Delta Greek: δελτα	Released: 12 May 2025; Label: Panik Records; Formats: CD, CD/DVD, digital download		

=== Collections ===
Title	Details	Peak chart positions
Title	Details	GRE
Demy	Released: 18 April 2017; Label: Panik Records; Formats: CD, digital download	13

=== Extended plays ===
Title	Details	Peak chart positions	Certifications
Title	Details	GRE	Certifications
Mono Mprosta (Greek: Μόνο Μπροστά) (English: Only Forward)	Released: 23 May 2012; Label: Panik Records; Formats: Digital download	1	IFPI Greece: Gold
Poses Xiliades Kalokairia (Greek: Πόσες Χιλιάδες Καλοκαίρια) (English: How Many Thousand Summers)	Released: 6 July 2012; Label: Panik Records; Formats: Digital download	1	IFPI Greece: Platinum
Retrospective	Released: 24 May 2019; Label: Panik Records; Formats: Digital download		IFPI Greece: Platinum

=== Singles ===
==== As lead artist ====
Title	Year	Peak chart positions	Album
Title	Year	GRE	Album
"Mono Mprosta"	2011	1	#1
"Poses Xiliades Kalokairia"	2012	1	#1
"I Zoi (To Pio Omorfo Tragoudi)"	2012	1	#1
"Ki An Prospatho"	2013	47	#1
"Μeno"	2013	35	#1
"Oso O Kosmos Tha Ehi Esena" (featuring Mike)	2014	1	Rodino Oneiro
"Rodino Oneiro"	2014	24	Rodino Oneiro
"Proti mou fora" (featuring Melisses)	2015	44	Rodino Oneiro
"I Alitheia Moiazei Psema"	2015	1	Rodino Oneiro
"Tha Meineis Fevgontas"	2016	100	Kontra
"Isovia Mazi" (Greek cover)	2016	77	Kontra
"This is Love"	2017	3	Kontra
"Angels"	2017	21	Kontra
"When the morning comes"	2017	19	Kontra
"M' Ekdikise"	2017	43	Kontra
"Ston Aera" (OST Success Story)	2017	65	Kontra
"Orio Kanena"	2018	43	
"Kyma Kalokairino"	2018	78	
"Right Now" (English version of "Orio Kanena")	2018	–	
"Ela (OST "Perimenontas Ti Nona")"	2018	78	
"Dipla Mou" (featuring Katerina Papoutsaki)	2019	–	
"Myrtia"	2019	–	
"Na Me Thymasai Kai Na M' Agapas"	2019	–	
"Mia Agapi Gia To Kalokairi"	2019	–	
"Sta Kokkina" (featuring FY)	2020	6	
"Ela" (featuring Sigma)	2021	49	
"Apothimena" (featuring JiMBo)	2022	32	
"Milia makria (OST "Tria milia")"	2022	–	
"Fimes lene"	2022	30	
"Floga"	2023	–	
"Gia sena" (featuring JimBo)	2023	–	
"Thelo na me kratas – '23 Version"	2023	–	
"—" denotes a single that did not chart or was not released in that territory.

==== As featured artist ====
Title	Year	Peak chart positions		Album
Title	Year	GRE	BUL	Album
"Mia Zografia (O Kosmos Mas)" (Midenistis feat. Demy)	2011	1	—	#1
"Fallin'" (Playmen feat. Demy)	2012	1	12	#1
"The Sun" (Alex Leon featuring Demy & Epsilon)	2013	1	—	Rodino Oneiro
"Nothing Better" (Playmen feat. Demy)	2014	37	—	Rodino Oneiro
"Where Is the Love" (Angel Stoxx feat. Demy)	2015	89	—	Rodino Oneiro
"Kati Pige Strava" (Digi featuring RadioAct & Demy)	2016	35	—	Kontra
"Me Oplo Tin Foni Sou" (OGE & Charis Savva featuring Demy)	2016	44	—	Kontra
"Million to one" (Playmen feat. Demy, Andy Nicolas And Mc Timm)	2017	—	—	—
"An" (Tasos Xiarcho feat. Demy)	2020	—	—	—
"Adieksodo" (Apon & OGE feat. Demy)	2020	40	—	—
"Eyes talk" (Thomas Sykes feat. Demy)	2022	—	—	—
"Ydra (Kapos Allios vol.9)" (Negros Tou Moria feat. Demy and ODYDOZE)	2023	—	—	—

==== Promotional singles ====
Year	Title	Album
2013	"Stay Here"	–
2015	"One Love"	Demy
2015	"Εmeis"	Kontra
2016	"You Fooled Me"	Rodino Oneiro
2017	"Oso Zo (This is Love)"	Kontra
2018	"Kyklos"	Kontra
2018	"Kontra ston chrono"	Kontra
2018	"Too late"	–

== List of awards and nominations received by Demy ==
=== MAD Video Music Awards Greece ===
The MAD Video Music Awards are presented annually by MAD TV (Greece), to recognize achievements in the Greek music industry, voted by the viewers of MAD TV. Demy has received 11 awards from 30 nominations.

Year	Nominee / work	Award	Result
2012	Demy	Best New Artist	Won
2012	Demy	Best Female Artist	Nominated
2012	Mia Zografia (with Midenistis)	Video Clip Duet	Won
2012	Mia Zografia (with Midenistis)	Video Clip Hip Hop/Urban	Won
2012	Mia Zografia (with Midenistis)	Video Clip of the Year	Nominated
2012	Fallin (with Playmen)	MAD Radio 106.2 Track of the Year	Nominated
2013	Demy	Best Female Artist	Nominated
2013	Demy	Artist of the Year	Nominated
2013	Poses Xiliades Kalokairia	Best Pop Video	Won
2013	Poses Xiliades Kalokairia	Video Clip of the Year	Nominated
2014	The Sun (with Alex Leon & Epsilon)	Video Clip Dance	Nominated
2014	The Sun (with Alex Leon & Epsilon)	Song of the Year	Won
2014	The Sun (with Alex Leon & Epsilon)	Video Clip of the Year	Won
2014	Oloi Mazi (Me Mia Foni) (with Positive Sounderz)	Video Clip Duet / Collaboration	Nominated
2014	Demy	Best Female Artist	Nominated
2014	Demy	Artist of the Year	Nominated
2015	Oso O kosmos Tha Exei Esena (with Mike)	Best Duet	Won
2015	Oso O kosmos Tha Exei Esena (with Mike)	Best Video Clip Pop	Nominated
2015	Oso O kosmos Tha Exei Esena (with Mike)	Best Video Clip	Nominated
2015	Demy	Best Female Artist	Won
2016	"I Alitheia Moiazei Psema"	Best Video of the Year	Nominated
2016	"I Alitheia Moiazei Psema"	Best Urban Video	Won
2016	"Where Is The Love" (Demy feat. Angel Stoxx)	Best Dance Video	Nominated
2016	Demy	Best Female Modern	Nominated
2016	Demy	Mad Cyprus Award	Won
2017	"This Is Love"	Video of the Year	Won
2017	"This Is Love"	Best Dance Video	Nominated
2017	"Tha Meineis Feugontas"	Best Ballad Video	Nominated
2017	Demy	Best Female Modern	Nominated
2017	Demy	Superfans of the Year	Nominated
2019	Demy	Best Female Modern	Nominated
2021	Sta kokkina (feat. FY)	MAD Radio 106.2 Track of the Year	Nominated
2022	Apothimena (feat. JiMbo)	Best Pop Song	

Mad Video Music Awards Cyprus

Year	Recipient/Nominated work	Award	Result
2015	Demy	Love FM Award	Won

=== Super Fm Radio Cyprus ===
Year	Nominee / work	Award	Result
2016	Demy	Style Icon of The Year	Won
2016	Demy	Best Female Singer	Nominated
2017	Demy	Best Pop/Rock Singer	Nominated
2017	"This Is Love"	Best English Single	Won
2017	"Me Oplo Tin Foni Sou" ft Demy	Best Duet/Collaboration	Nominated
2018	"To Mono Pou Thimamai" Evridiki ft Demy	Best Duet/Collaboration	Won

=== MTV Europe Music Awards ===
The MTV Europe Music Awards (EMA) were established in 1994 by MTV Networks Europe to celebrate the most popular music videos in Europe.

Year	Nominee / work	Award	Result
2013	Demy	Best Greek Act	Won
2013	Demy	Best European Act	Nominated

=== Nickelodeon Kids' Choice Awards ===
Year	Nominee / work	Award	Result
2018	Demy	Favorite Greek Music Artist	Won

=== Lalore02 Awards ===
Year	Nominee / work	Award	Result
2012	Poses Xiliades Kalokairia (Demy)	Song of the Year	Nominated

== Musicals ==
Year	Title
2012–2013	Fame: The Musical
2014	Priscilla: The Musical
2015	The Sound of Music
2016	Addams Family
2016–2018	Mamma Mia
2023–2024	Anastasia: The Musical
2024–2025	My Fair Lady

== Television ==
Year	Title	Channel	Role	Notes
2014	The Music School	Mega Channel	Herself	Judge; Kids Talent Show
2017	Greece in the Eurovision Song Contest 2017	ERT1	Herself	Internal Selection
2017	Eurovision Song Contest 2017	ERT1	Herself	Final Contestant; 19th place
2018	New Wave Festival 2018	–	Herself	Contestant; 3rd place

== Movie ==
Year	Title	Role	Note
2018	Waiting for the Godmother	Faidra	Main character

== Stages ==
List of stages visited by Demy

Name	Location	Year(s)	Month(s)	Other artists	Notes
Mezzo Athens	Athens	2022	November	Ilias Vrettos & Enorasis	Demy thanks the artists mentioned on her instagram and on there instagram's we can find mentions of the stage too
Mezzo Athens	Athens	2022	December	Ilias Vrettos & Enorasis	Demy thanks the artists mentioned on her instagram and on there instagram's we can find mentions of the stage too
Mezzo Athens	Athens	2023	January	Ilias Vrettos & Enorasis	Demy thanks the artists mentioned on her instagram and on there instagram's we can find mentions of the stage too
Mezzo Athens	Athens	2023	February	Ilias Vrettos & Enorasis	Demy thanks the artists mentioned on her instagram and on there instagram's we can find mentions of the stage too
Mezzo Athens	Athens	2023	March	Ilias Vrettos & Enorasis	Demy thanks the artists mentioned on her instagram and on there instagram's we can find mentions of the stage too
Vergina Theatro	Thessaloniki	2023	April	George Theofanous & Anastasios Rammos	Demy thanks the artists mentioned on her instagram

List of artists that worked with Demy

Artist	Songs together	First	Last	Stages together	Notes
Midenistis	1	2011		–	They published together only Demy's debuting single
Playmen	3	2012	2017	–	
Alex Leon	1	2013		–	Part of one single: "The Sun"
Epsilon	1	2013		–	Part of one single: "The Sun"
Mike	1	2014		–	First artist Demy featured
Melisses	1	2015		–	
Angel Stoxx	1	2015		–	
Digi	1	2016		–	Part of one single: "Kati Pige Strava"
RadioAct	1	2016		–	Part of one single: "Kati Pige Strava"
OGE	2	2016	2020	–	Part of one single: "Me Oplo Tin Foni Sou"
Charis Savva	1	2016		–	Part of one single: "Me Oplo Tin Foni Sou"
Andy Nicolas	1	2017		–	Part of one single: "Million to one"
Mc Timm	1	2017		–	Part of one single: "Million to one"
Katerina Papoutsaki	1	2019		–	
Tasos Xiarcho	1	2020		–	
Apon	1	2020		–	
FY	1	2021		–	
Sigma	1	2021		–	
JimBo	2	2022	2023	–	They published together JimBo's debuting single
Thomas Sykes	1	2022		–	
Negros Tou Moria	1	2023		–	Part of one single: "Ydra (Kapos Allios vol.9)"
ODYDOZE	1	2023		–	Part of one single: "Ydra (Kapos Allios vol.9)"
Number of Artists	Total Songs	First	Last	Total Stages	Notes
22	19	2011	2023	–	Last updated on 20 June 2023

== Notes ==
Awards and achievements
Preceded by Argo with "Utopian Land"	Greece in the Eurovision Song Contest; 2017	Succeeded by Gianna Terzi with "Oneiro mou"
