= Sona Shahgeldyan =

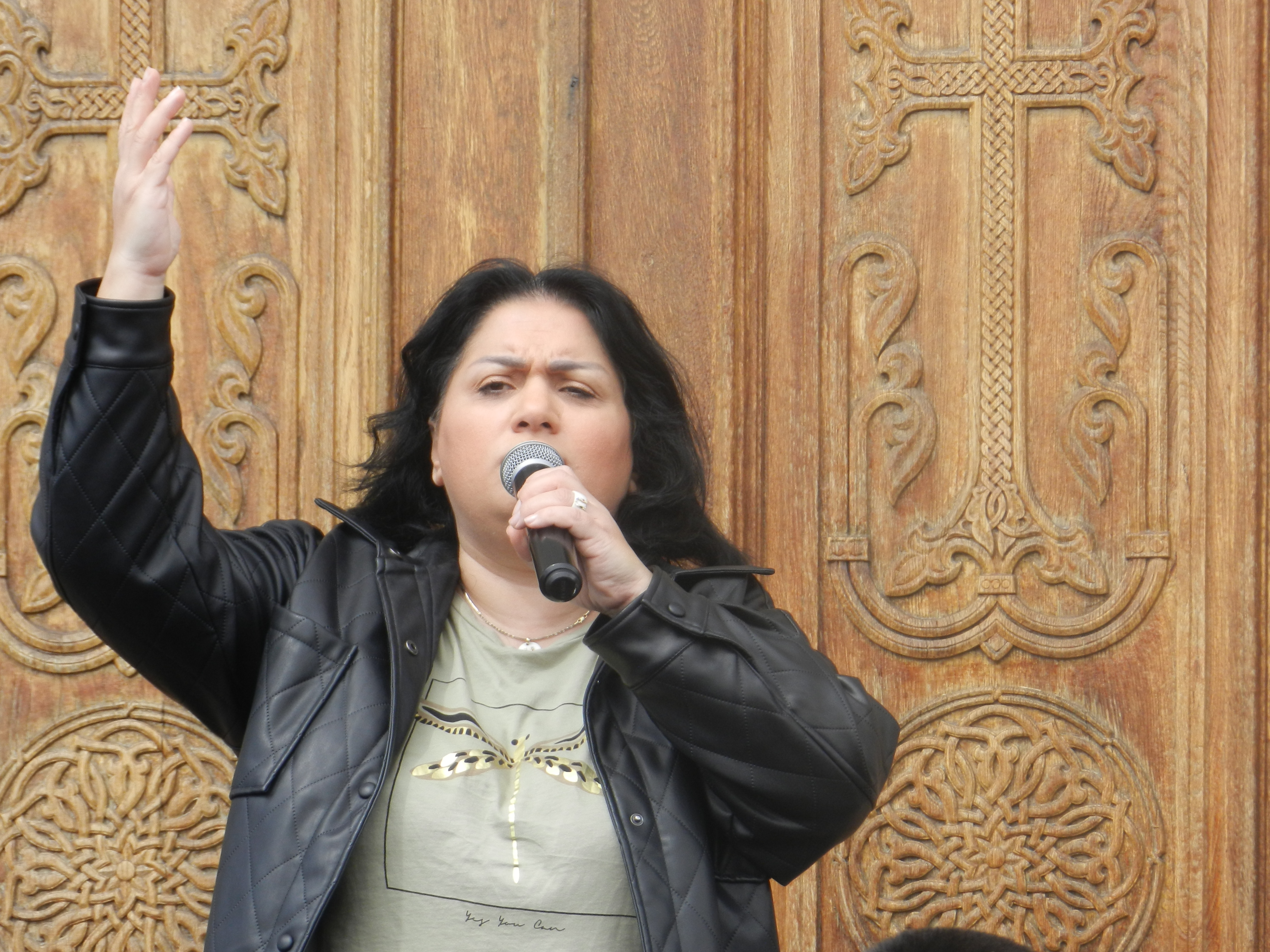
- Born: Sona Shahgeldyan/Սոնա Շահգելդյան; February 14, 1986 (age 40); Yerevan, Armenian SSR, Soviet Union
- Education: Komitas State Conservatory of Yerevan
- Occupations: Actress, singer
- Years active: 1993–present

Sona Hovhannesi Shahgeldyan (Armenian: Սոնա Հովհաննեսի Շահգելդյան, born on November 18, 1986), is an Armenian singer and actress. Her first video clip was released in 2007. She is known for her roles as Sona on Domino (Armenian TV series), Ripo on North-South. She won the 2010 edition of New Wave.

== Filmography ==
Film
Year	Title	Role	Notes
2015	Four Buddies and the Bride (North-South)	Ripo	

Television and web
Year	Title	Role	Notes
2016–present	Domino (Armenian TV series)	Sona Shahgeldyan	Recurring cast

== Discography ==
=== Songs ===
- 2007 – "Qez Knvirem"
- 2008 – "Du Spasir" (featuring with Liana)
- 2008 – "Menq Miasin enq" (We are together, featuring with Arsen Grigoryan)
- 2009 – "Chem Uzum"
- 2009 – "Depi Yerkinq"
- 2009 – "Dzerqd Meknir"
- 2010 – "Korust te Gandz"
- 2010 – "Du menak ches" (You're not alone)
- 2011 – "I look to you"
- 2011 – "Verev Nayir"
- 2012 – "Ashun Dzmer Garun"
- 2012 – "Ser te Yeraz" (Love or Dream)
- 2012 – "Haskacel em" (I've understood, featuring with Arsen Hayrapetyan)
- 2013 – "Le rêve brisé" (French)
- 2013 – "Harsi shor" (Dress of bride)
- 2013 – "Oror Balikin" (featuring with Saro)
- 2013 – "Dzyun"
- 2013 – "Tar indz jamanak"
- 2013 – "Es gnum em" (featuring with Saro)
- 2013 – "Astvatz indz mi jampha tur"
- 2013 – "If I could"
- 2013 – "Siro Erku Tev" (featuring with Armeni)
- 2014 – "Norapsakner"
- 2014 – "Maria" (featuring with Saro)
- 2014 – "Baby come to me"
- 2014 – "Love Me"
- 2014 – "Baby come to me"
- 2014 – "My Eccentric Nature"
- 2015 – "Sareri hovin mernem"
- 2015 – "Believe"
- 2015 – "Malvina"
- 2015 – "Yntaniq"

Music Video
Year	Title	Artist
2015	You're My Sunshine	Aram MP3
