= Hovhannes Davtyan (actor) =

Armenian actor

- Born: Hovhannes Davtyan; January 9, 1985 (age 41); Yerevan, Armenian SSR, Soviet Union
- Education: Yerevan State Institute of Theater and Cinematography
- Occupations: Actor, humorist
- Years active: 2004–present
- Height: 168 cm (5 ft 6 in)

Hovhannes Davtyan (Armenian: Հովհաննես Դավթյան, born on January 9, 1985), is an Armenian actor. He is known for his roles as Mkho (Mekhak) Arevshatyan on In The Army and In The City . He was a guest of Sixth Sense on March 18, 2016 and a guest for Name that Tune on 2016 February 9. Hovhannes is now a stand up comedian, and has his own stand-up theatre show.

== Filmography ==
Television and web
Year	Title	Role	Notes
2010-2012	In The Army (Armenian TV series)	Mkho (Mekhak) Arevshatyan	Main cast
October 1, 2012 – December 31, 2014	In The City (Armenian TV series)	Mkho (Mekhak) Arevshatyan	Main cast
2016	Domino (Armenian TV series)	Yura	Recurring cast

As himself
Year	Title	Notes
2014	6th sense	Guest
2017	3/OFF	Contestant
2018-Now	Hovhannes Davtyan stand up show (In different theaters)	Comedian
