= Saro Gevorgyan =

Armenian singer and songwriter

Saro Gevorgyan Սարո Գևորգյան
- Born: December 23, 1998 (age 26); Martuni, Armenia
- Genres: Pop
- Occupation(s): Singer, songwriter
- Years active: 2012–present

Saro Gevorgyan (Armenian: Սարո Գևորգյան; born 23 December 1998) is an Armenian singer and songwriter. His first single was released in 2021. He won the 2021 edition of New Wave.

== Biography ==
Gevorgyan received his musical education at the Yerevan State College of Culture and Arts. Then he continued his studies at the State Theater of Song of Armenia.

In 2012, he was recognized as the winner of the competition in St. Petersburg.

In 2015, he won the international competition "The Way to the Stars" («Путь к звездам!»), competing with 220 participants. In 2016, Gevorgyan took part in the Depi Evratesil show, the Armenian national selection for the Eurovision Song Contest, where he got into Aram's Mp3 team, but was unable to reach the final.

In 2019, he participated in the Eurovision Song Contest in Tel Aviv as the backing vocalist of the Armenia's participant Srbuk.

In 2020, Gevorgyan submitted an application for the New Wave competition, but it was canceled due to the COVID-19 pandemic. In 2021, he won the New Wave competition in Sochi, becoming the third participant to bring victory to Armenia in the entire history of its participation.

On 19 August 2021, Gevorgyan released his debut track "Bipolar Love". Today Saro Gevorgyan is a member of the Project 12 cover group.

== Discography ==
=== Singles ===
Title	Year	Album
"Bipolyarnaya Lyubov" (Bipolar Love)	2021	Non-album singles
"Fall in Love"	2021	Non-album singles
