= Erna Mir =

Armenian singer

Erna Mirzoyan (Armenian: Էրնա Միրզոյան born in 1998), better known by her stage name Erna Mir, is an Armenian singer. In 2017, Erna represented Armenia at the New Wave international contest in Sochi and won it along with DoReDoS and Sardor Milano. The singer has also competed in The Voice of Armenia in 2014 and advanced to the final.
