= Poses Hiliades Kalokairia =

EP by Demy
- Released: 6 July 2012
- Recorded: 2011
- Genre: Pop
- Label: Panik Records

Demy chronology
Mono Brosta (2012)	Poses Hiliades Kalokairia (2012)	#1 (2012)

Poses Hiliades Kalokairia is the second extended play by Greek singer Demy, released in Greece on 6 July 2012 by Panik Records. The album has peaked at number 1 on the Greek Albums Chart. She released the single as a digital download on 6 June 2012. The song also peaked at number 1 on the Greek Singles Chart.

== Track listing ==
Digital download - Single
No.	Title	Length
1.	"Poses Hiliades Kalokairia"	3:22

Digital download - EP
No.	Title	Length
1.	"Poses Hiliades Kalokairia"	3:22
2.	"Love Light - Poses Hiliades Kalokairia" (Dance Remix)	3:34
3.	"Poses Hiliades Kalokairia" (Dance Remix)	3:21

== Charts ==
Chart (2012)	Peak position
EP
Greece (IFPI)	1
Single
Greece (IFPI)	1

== Release history ==
Region	Date	Format	Label
Greece	6 July 2012	Digital download	Panik Records
