= Mono Brosta =

EP by Demy
- Released: 23 May 2012
- Recorded: 2011
- Genre: Pop
- Label: Panik Records

Demy chronology
Mono Brosta (2012)	Poses Hiliades Kalokairia (2012)

Mono Brosta is the debut extended play by Greek singer Demy, released in Greece on 23 May 2012 by Panik Records. The album has peaked at number 1 on the Greek Albums Chart. She released the single as a digital download in 2011. The song also peaked at number 1 on the Greek Singles Chart.

== Track listing ==
Digital download - EP
No.	Title	Length
1.	"Mono Brosta"	3:25
2.	"Krathse Me"	3:36
3.	"Mia Zografia"	3:59
4.	"Mono Brosta" (Niko Souliotis Remix) (feat. Oge)	3:58

== Charts ==
=== Weekly charts ===
Chart (2011/12)	Peak position
EP & Single
Greece (IFPI)	1

== Release history ==
Region	Date	Format	Label
Greece	23 May 2012	Digital download	Panik Records
