= New Wave (competition) =

International contest for young performers of popular music

- Genre: Pop, europop, jazz
- Dates: Six days (three contest days) in July
- Locations: Jūrmala, Latvia (2002–2014); Sochi, Russia (2015–2019); Kazan, Russia (2020, planned)
- Years active: 2002–2019; 2021–present
- Founders: Igor Krutoy and Raimonds Pauls
- Website: newwavecontest.ru

New Wave (Russian: Новая волна, Novaya volna, Latvian: Jaunais Vilnis) is an international contest for young performers of popular music founded in 2002 by the Russian composer Igor Krutoy and Latvian pianist and composer Raimonds Pauls, and was later enhanced by the Russian superstar Alla Pugacheva. Along with Pugacheva, the headliners of the competition were Valery Leontyev, Patricia Kaas, Toto Cutugno, Lou Bega, Craig David and Svetlana Loboda. Since 2016, Pugacheva has not participated in the organization of the competition.

The contest usually lasts for six days: 3 contest days, 2 special event days and, at the end, the day when the contest's results are announced followed by an ending concert.

== History ==
The New Wave competition, held annually in Jūrmala, Latvia, from 2002 to 2014, became a magnet for Russian oligarchs and elites, transforming the seaside resort into a hub of wealth and influence during its summer festivals.

Organized by Russian composer Igor Krutoy and Latvian composer Raimonds Pauls, with Russian superstar Alla Pugacheva as a prominent figure, the event attracted high-profile figures such as oligarchs Mikhail Fridman, Roman Abramovich, alongside Russian businessmen Umar Dzhabrailov, politicians like Mikhail Kasyanov, Duma MPs, and even FSB officials like Vladimir Pronichev and transportation minister of Russia Igor Levitin, as well as other elite members like Petr Aven, Yuri Shefler, Len Blavatnik, and Oleg Boyko. As well Ukrainian oligarchs like Rinat Akhmetov. The festival's concerts and exclusive VIP events, where tables in the Dzintari concert hall's VIP lounge cost up to £25,000, facilitated networking among Russia's elite, with their combined wealth reportedly exceeding Latvia's national budget.

Critics, including Latvian investigative journalist Leonid Jakobson, argued that the event served as a discreet venue for Russian mafia like Vyacheslav Shestakov who is tied to Aslan Usoyan, and Kremlin figures to discuss business and geopolitical strategies, raising concerns about Latvia's growing role as a playground for Russian interests. The festival's relocation to Sochi in 2015 followed Latvia's ban on Russian performers like Oleg Gazmanov for supporting Russia's annexation of Crimea, marking the end of Jūrmala's era as a Russian elite hotspot.

== Participants ==
Although meant to popularize new stars from all over Europe, the countries of the former Soviet Union and the United States, many present and former superstars play an important, if not the most important, role in it. Many participants have also represented their countries at the Junior Eurovision Song Contest, including but not limited to: Helena Meraai (Belarus), Gaia Cauchi (Malta), (Armenia), Ela Mangion (Malta), Daneliya Tuleshova (Kazakhstan), Krisia Todorova (Bulgaria), Lerika Engalycheva (Russia and Moldova), Anahit Adamyan (Armenia), Polina Bogusevich (Russia), Misha Gregoryan (Armenia), Anastasiya Baginska (Ukraine), Dino Jelusić (Croatia) and Daniel Yastremski (Belarus).

In 2007, the contest's closing concert featured not only the competition winners and Russian pop stars, but also US musician Stevie Wonder and world-famous Russian baritone Dmitry Hvorostovsky.

New Wave contestants have also represented their country at the Eurovision Song Contest including Jamala (Ukraine), DoReDos (Moldova), Natalia Gordienko (Moldova), Demy (Greece), Nutsa Buzaladze (Georgia) and Saro Gevorgyan (Armenia; as a backing vocalist).

== Winners ==
| Year | Country | Contestant |
|---|---|---|
| 2026 | Armenia | Flora Bichakhchyan |
| 2025 | Kazakhstan | Alex Lim |
| 2024 | Armenia | Anahit Hakobyan |
| 2021 | Armenia | Saro Gevorgyan |
| 2019 | Albania | Inis Neziri |
| 2018 | Russia | Dan Rosin |
| 2017 | Armenia | Erna Mir |
| 2017 | Moldova | DoReDoS |
| 2017 | Uzbekistan | Sardor Milano |
| 2016 | Croatia | Dino Jelusić |
| 2016 | Italy | Walter Ricci |
| 2015 | Croatia | Damir Kedžo |
| 2014 | Georgia | Nutsa Buzaladze |
| 2013 | Cuba | Roberto Kel Torres |
| 2012 | Russia | Niloo |
| 2011 | United States | Jayden Felder |
| 2010 | Armenia | Sona Shahgeldyan |
| 2009 | Indonesia | Sandhy Sondoro |
| 2009 | Ukraine | Jamala |
| 2008 | Georgia | Duo Georgia |
| 2007 | Moldova | Natalia Gordienko |
| 2006 | United States | Anjuelaye Larose |
| 2005 | Latvia | Intars Busulis |
| 2004 | Latvia | Cosmos |
| 2003 | Russia | Anastasia Stotskaya |
| 2002 | Russia | Smash!!! |

== Location ==
For the first 14 years, New Wave was held in the Latvian coastal city of Jūrmala, but in 2015, it moved to Sochi, the Russian Federation (other potential locations included Baku, Kaliningrad, Kazan, and Crimea). According to organizer Igor Krutoy, the competition was relocated due to Russian singers Valeriya, Iosif Kobzon and Oleg Gazmanov being denied entry into Latvia by then Minister of Foreign Affairs Edgars Rinkēvičs because of their voiced support for Russia's annexation of Crimea.

== See also ==
- Russian pop
- Jurmala Young Pop Singer Competition
