= Domino (TV series) =

- Դոմինո
- Genre: Comedy drama; Romance
- Developed by: Harutyun Khalafyan
- Starring: Sos Janibekyan; Mher Khachatryan; Narek Baveyan
- Composer: DUETRO STUDIO
- Country of origin: Armenia
- Original language: Armenian
- No. of seasons: 5
- No. of episodes: 121 (list of episodes)

Production
- Producer: Harout Khalafyan
- Production locations: Yerevan, Armenia
- Running time: 29-32 minutes

Original release
- Network: Armenia TV
- Release: September 15, 2015 – December 31, 2017

Related
- Full House (Armenian TV series)

Domino is an Armenian sitcom developed by Harout Khalafyan. The series premiered on Armenia TV on September 15, 2015. The series takes place in Yerevan, Armenia.

== Series overview ==
Because of problems at work, three friends (Mika, Norik, Garik/Doctor) decide to get together and set up an own business. Saying goodbye to the former management in not very amiable manner they apply for a loan from the bank. Money given by the bank is less than the needed amount, so the young men decide to fill the lack. They bet all the money and unfortunately lose everything. There’s nothing left for them to do but to return to ex job, to stand not so friendly boss, to work double time in order to be able to pay the loan. Realization of all this should be combined with their personal life. In one case a suspicious wife controlling the income of her husband, in other case a fiancée whose family has been waiting long for their marriage, and in third case an emerging new romance.

== Cast and characters ==
- Sos Janibekyan portrays Mika (seasons 1,2,3,4,5) Single boy
- Mher Khachatryan portrays Garik "Doctor" (Seasons 1,2,3,4,5) Husband of Sofa
- Narek Baveyan portrays Norik (Seasons 1,2,3,4,5) Ex-boyfriend of Lilit
- Anna Grigoryan portrays Ani (season 1) Director of Cafe
- Gayane Avetisyan portrays Sofa (Seasons 1,2,3,) Wife of Garik
- Lika Salmanyan portrays Lilit (Season 1) Engaged of Norik
- Arsen Grigoryan portrays Artur (Seasons 1,2,3) Bank employee
- Rippi Navasardyan portrays Kara (Seasons 1,2,3,4,5) Wife of Viktor
- Yelena Vardanyan portrays Nelly Vardanovna (Seasons 1,2) Director of gym, mistress of Gago
- Satenik Ohanyan portrays Margarita "Margo" (Seasons 1,2) Director of Massage Center
- Ara Karagyan portrays Alik (Season 1,2) Director of restaurant
- Narine Aleksanyan portrays Janna (1,2,3,4,5) Worker in restaurant
- Hayk Hambartzumyan portrays Viktor (Seasons 1,2) Husband of Kara
- Jora Hovhannisyan portrays Gugo (Seasons 1,2) Worker in restaurant
- Silvi Barkova portrays - Lili (Season 2,3,4,5)
- Saten Ghazaryan portrays - Emma (Season 1,2,3,4,5)
- Liana Nikoghosyan portrays - Erika (Season 2)
- Christina Khachatryan portrays - Iza (Season 2)
- Hovhannes Davtyan portrays - Yura (Season 2)
- Sona Shahgeldyan portrays - Sona (Seasons 2-3)
- Arpine Israelyan portrays - Nare (Season 3,4,5)
- Zara Minasyan portrays - Anna (Season 3)
- Armina Asryan portrays - Anushik (Season 3)
- Sergey Grigoryan portrays - Arakel Arkhangelski (Season 3,4,5)
- Tina Gavalyan portrays - Tigranuhi, Tina (Season 4) Sofa's aunt.
- Hovhannes Azoyan portrays - Miko (Season 5)
- Mery Hakobyan portrays - Sofi ( Season 5)
